= List of cities, towns and villages in Khuzestan province =

The following is the List of cities, towns and villages in Khuzestan Province of Iran.

== Alphabetical ==
Cities are in bold text; all others are villages.

=== A ===
Ab Amiri | Ab Anar | Ab Anari | Ab Bahar-e Do | Ab Baran | Ab Baran-e Do | Ab Baran-e Yek | Ab Barik | Ab Bid Sari-ye Do | Ab Bid | Ab Bid | Ab Bid | Ab Bid | Ab Bid | Ab Bid | Ab Bid | Ab Bid | Ab Bid | Ab Bid-e Alibaz | Ab Bid-e Galleh Tavak | Ab Bid-e Hajj Baba | Ab Chahru | Ab Chenar | Ab Chendar | Ab Chendar | Ab Darreh | Ab Difeh | Ab Gandu | Ab Gareyu | Ab Garmak | Ab Garmak-e Olya | Ab Garmak-e Sofla | Ab Garmeh | Ab Ghar | Ab Gonjeshki | Ab Gonji | Ab Gorazi | Ab Hamam | Ab Jadan Qoliabad | Ab Jaz | Ab Kabud-e Sofla | Ab Kaseh | Ab Khar Zahreh | Ab Kharzahreh | Ab Khugan | Ab Konar | Ab Koreh | Ab Kulak | Ab Lashkar-e Olya | Ab Lashkar-e Sofla | Ab Lashkar-e Vosta | Ab Maik-e Golzari | Ab Malek | Ab Mishan | Ab Nagun | Ab Nargesi | Ab Nik | Ab Nik | Ab Qaleh | Ab Qanat | Ab Rah | Ab Razak | Ab Rizak | Ab Sila | Ab Surakh | Ab Surakh | Ab Tasuleh | Ab Zahlu | Ab Zalu-ye Arab | Ab Zalu-ye Bahram | Ab Zehlu | Abad | Abadan | Abadi-ye Majid | Abaviyeh | Abazar | Abbas Ali | Abbas Yales-e Do | Abbas Yales-e Yek | Abbas | Abbasabad | Abbasabad-e Ashrafi | Abbasabad-e Fakhrai | Abbasiyeh | Abd Bayan | Abd Bayan-e Qadim | Abd ol Rahman | Abdahabad | Abdikhani | Abdol Amir | Abd-ol Seyyed | Abdoli | Abdoliyeh | Abdolreza Mordeh | Abdolreza | Ab-e Mozhgan | Abezhdan | Abezhdan | Abezhdan-e Malmulil | Abezhdan-e Sofla | Abgah | Abgarmak | Abgun | Abid | Abid | Abirash | Abjaz | Ableh-ye Olya | Ableh-ye Sofla | Ablesh | Abrak-e Azhgil | Abrak-e Do | Abrak-e Yek | Abrizaki | Abrizaki | Abshar | Abtar | Abu Alimeh | Abu Amud | Abu Arabid | Abu Arazeh | Abu Boqqal | Abu Dabis | Abzalu | Achreshiyeh-ye Bozorg | Adabis | Add-e Sovadi | Ad-e Qomeys | Adin Ali Nazri | Adiv Chaliv | Aghajari | Agleh Bachay | Agleh Zovihed | Ahangaran | Ahangari | Ahaymer | Ahmad Aqa | Ahmad Mowla | Ahmadabad | Ahmadabad | Ahmadabad | Ahmadabad | Ahmadabad | Ahmadabad-e Abdal | Ahmadabad-e Barkeh | Ahmadabad-e Dinarak | Ahmadabad-e Sar Tang | Ahmad-e Omran | Ahvaz | Air Force Housing | Aka | Akbarabad | Akseh-ye Olya | Akseh-ye Sofla | Al Aqda | Alad | Alamabad-e Mohandes | Alamdar | Alamdari | Alavi | Alavoneh | Alavoneh-ye Fay | Albaji | Albu Afri | Albu Afri-ye Jonubi | Albu Gulak | Albu Hamid | Albu Hardan-e Olya | Albu Hesar | Albu Naim | Albu Nisi | Albu Obeyd | Albu Sanvan | Albu Sayyad | Albu Shelug | Albu Soveyt | Albuebadi | Albuid-e Yek Nabi | Albujenam | Albumraveh Shamkoli | Albusavadi | Al-e Tayyeb | Algi | Alhak | Alhasi | Ali Arab | Ali Asghar Kutki | Ali Fateh | Ali Hoseyn | Ali Nazer | Ali Panah | Ali Pir Vali Muman | Ali Yar | Ali Zogheyr | Ali | Aliabad | Aliabad | Aliabad | Aliabad | Aliabad | Aliabad | Aliabad | Aliabad-e Hufel | Aliabad-e Olya | Aliabad-e Sofla | Alidad | Alimorad | Aljazayer | Allah Rahim | Alleh-ye Band-e Qir | Alleh-ye Hajj Abdol Ali | Alma-ye Sofla | Alus | Alvan | Alvan | Alvan-e Eshareh | Alvan-e Moslem | Alvaniyeh | Am Altamir | Am Dabs | Am ol Deyay-e Do | Am ol Deyay-e Yek | Amalal | Amaleh Seyf | Amaleh-ye Teymur | Amashiyeh-ye Do | Amashiyeh-ye Yek | Aminabad | Amir Cheraghali | Amir Seyf | Amirabad | Amirabad | Amirabad | Amireh | Amlahah | Ammeh | Anaraki | Anayeh | Anbar | Anbargah | Andikayi | Andimeshk | Aniyyat | Anjeh | Anjirak | Anjireh | Anjirestan | Aqa Bagi | Aqa Bozorg |Aqatla | Arab Asad | Arab Hasan | Arab Rashed | Aram | Arayez | Arayyez-e Ahmadi | Arazeh | Arba Va Akhmas | Arbihat | Ardafeh | Armish | Arvandkenar | Asad Khan | Asad-abad | Asalu | Aseyfer | Ashareh-ye Bozorg | Ashareh-ye Kuchek | Ashareh-ye Olya | Ashareh-ye Sofla | Ashireh-ye Khalaf | Asiab | Asiyab-e Shekasteh | Askaleh-ye Bandar Emam | Aslan | Astishan | Asun Zahleh | Atash | Atiyeh | Attabiyeh-ye Jonubi | Attabiyeh-ye Shomali | Avafi | Avagun | Avaz Ali Najafqoli | Avazabad | Avend | Avifi | Ayda | Aymur | Ayyash | Azab | Azadi | Azanak-e Kukya | Azanak-e Olya | Azibi | Azrag

=== B ===
Baba Khoda | Baba Zahed | Baba Zahed | Babel | Bachachereh-ye Olya | Badali | Badam Zar | Badamestan-e Farvivand | Badamzar | Badarnegan | Badi | Badil | Badileyan | Badkam | Badlan | Badrani | Badriyeh | Bagh Baba | Bagh | Baghchehban | Bagh-e Malek | Bagh-e Molla | Bahar | Bahareh | Bahareh | Bahhas | Bahmanabad | Bahmanabad | Bahmanabad | Bahramabad | Bahramabad | Bahramabad | Bahramabad | Bahreh | Bahreh-ye Ruzeh | Bahriyeh | Bajul | Bakarjulan | Bakhtegan | Bakhtiar | Bakhtiar | Balaghab | Balam | Bali Khalk | Baliab | Balu | Balun | Balutak-e Sheykhan | Balyavi | Banar Kabutaran | Banar-e Vajel | Bandar-e Emam Khomeyni | Bandar-e Mahshahr | Bandbal-e Bala | Bandbal-e Pain | Band-e Qir | Bandeh | Bangestan | Bani Naameh-ye Jonubi | Bani Naameh-ye Shomali | Bapira | Bapir-e Jafar Qoli | Baq Beqab | Baqerabad | Bar Aftab | Bar Aftab | Bar Aftab-e Akbar | Bar Aftab-e Ali Momen | Bar Aftab-e Amanallah | Bar Aftab-e Chah Dowpowk | Bar Aftab-e Chel Khorasan | Bar Aftab-e Fazl | Bar Aftab-e Heydarqoli | Bar Aftab-e Kashkeli | Bar Aftab-e Olya | Bar Aftab-e Rezai | Bar Aftab-e Sadat | Bar Aftab-e Sipeh | Bar Aftab-e Sofla | Bar Aftab-e Zafari | Baran | Barangerd | Barbadineh | Barbugeh | Bard Azhadha | Bard Gapi | Bard Gola | Bard Kheymeh | Bard Tahdeh Seyyed Khosrow | Bard Zard | Bard Zard | Bard Zard | Bard Zard | Bardaru | Bardatar Kisteh | Bardboran | Bard-e Gap | Bard-e Gazhdi | Bard-e Guri | Bard-e Varbeh | Bardemil | Bardiyeh-ye Kuchek | Bardiyeh-ye Yek | Bardla | Bardmil | Bardneshandeh | Bardneshandeh | Bardpareh-ye Hasan | Baricheh | Baricheh | Barijeh-ye Enayat | Barik Ab | Bariki-ye Hasan Qoli | Bariki-ye Mohammad Qoli | Barm Shahzadeh Abdollah | Barm-e Gavmishi-ye Seh | Barreh Deh | Baryan | Basadi-ye Hajj Barun | Basadi-ye Olya | Basadi-ye Sofla | Basatin | Bastiyeh | Batuli | Batvand | Bavaj | Bavrameh | Bayman Sadat | Bayman-e Ariyez | Bazar Tombi | Bazargah | Bazargarah Molla Aqa | Bazkabad | Begesi | Beh Bid | Behbahan | Behesht Shahada | Behzadi | Bejak | Bekuni | Belad Motaleb-e Olya | Belad Motaleb-e Sofla | Beladiyeh | Belgarus | Beneshti | Benivar-e Olya | Benivar-e Sofla | Benivar-e Vosta | Benut-e Bala | Benut-e Pain | Benvar | Benvar | Bereychiyeh-ye Sofla | Beseytin | Beyt-e Ashur | Beyt-e Bavi | Beyt-e Fariyeh | Beyt-e Fayil-e Do | Beyt-e Fayil-e Yek | Beyt-e Kavar | Beyt-e Khalaf | Beyt-e Maluh | Beyt-e Matlib | Beyt-e Mohareb | Beyt-e Obeyd | Beyt-e Savadi | Beyt-e Seyvan | Beyt-e Seyyedsavileh | Beyt-e Sharhan | Beyt-e Shukaiyeh | Beyt-e Vavi | Beyuz | Beyuz | Beyuz-e Yek | Beyzeh Tak | Bi Bi Gol Mordeh-ye Olya | Bi Bi Gol Mordeh-ye Sofla | Bid Boland | Bid Zard | Bid Zard | Bid Zard-e Asmari | Bidabad | Bidestan | Bidrubeh-ye Markazi | Bidrubeh-ye Olya | Bidrubeh-ye Sofla | Bisheh Bozan | Bisheh Dulang | Bisheh-e Sorkh | Bogan | Boghdak | Boheyr-e Do | Boheyr-e Olya | Boheyr-e Sofla | Boheyr-e Yek | Bokeysheh | Bon Honi | Bon Konar | Bon Shovar | Bonaranda | Bondurab | Bon-e Dab | Boneh Alvan | Boneh Anbar | Boneh Deraz | Boneh Karuk | Boneh Lam | Boneh Shanbeh | Boneh Var-e Baba Ahmadi | Boneh Zard | Boneh-ye Abbas | Boneh-ye Ajam | Boneh-ye Akhund | Boneh-ye Amir Asgar | Boneh-ye Arun | Boneh-ye Atabak | Boneh-ye Azim | Boneh-ye Baba Zahed | Boneh-ye Bandar | Boneh-ye Cheragh | Boneh-ye Cheragh | Boneh-ye Esmail | Boneh-ye Fakhr-e Bala | Boneh-ye Fakhr-e Pain | Boneh-ye Fathali | Boneh-ye Gach | Boneh-ye Hajat | Boneh-ye Hajji | Boneh-ye Heydar | Boneh-ye Hoseyn Kaluli | Boneh-ye Isa | Boneh-ye Jan Mohammad | Boneh-ye Karim | Boneh-ye Kazem | Boneh-ye Kazem Hajj Soltan | Boneh-ye Kazem Jamal | Boneh-ye Khiraleh | Boneh-ye Majid | Boneh-ye Mirza | Boneh-ye Molla Ahmad | Boneh-ye Morteza | Boneh-ye Musa | Boneh-ye Nafal | Boneh-ye Naimeh | Boneh-ye Nejat | Boneh-ye Qeysar | Boneh-ye Qeytas | Boneh-ye Qobad | Boneh-ye Rahimali | Boneh-ye Rashid | Boneh-ye Sahrab | Boneh-ye Shir Mohammad | Boneh-ye Sorkhi | Boneh-ye Sukhteh | Boneh-ye Teymur | Boneh-ye Zolfaqar | Boni | Bonvar Hoseyn | Bonvar Shami | Boqeh-ye Do | Boqeh-ye Yek | Boreyje | Borj | Borj-e Bemuni Aqa | Borj-e Musavi | Borj-e Yusefi | Borul | Borvayeh | Borvayeh-ye Albu Aziz | Borvayeh-ye Omeyr | Borvayeh-ye Yusef | Bostan | Botliyeh | Bovirdeh | Bovirdeh Salamat | Bozi | Bozorg Ab | Bozorg Shivand | Bu Taheri | Bugandeh | Bugari | Bukhameh-ye Sofla | Bukhameh-ye Vosta | Bustanak | Buzi-ye Bala | Buzi-ye Seyf

=== C ===
Chaga Parviz | Chagah | Chagha Sorkhak | Chaghatayi | Chah Karmak | Chah Salem | Chahal Konar | Chahar Asiab | Chahar Bisheh | Chahar Bisheh | Chahar Darreh | Chahar Deh | Chahar Gaveh | Chahar Kulan | Chahar Marzun | Chahar Muran | Chahar Qash | Chahar Qash | Chahar Rah-e Tombal | Chahar Tang-e Olya | Chahar Tang-e Sofla | Chahardahi-ye Asgar | Chahardahi-ye Sohrab | Chal Abza | Chal Bardar | Chal Bardar | Chal Gondam | Chal Gurab | Chal Kareh | Chal Konar | Chal Meydan | Chal Qasem | Chal Revegeh | Chal Shah | Chal Shahrgariveh | Chal Tak-e Pain | Chalat | Chal-e Anjireh | Chal-e Balutak | Chal-e Direh Bozorg | Chal-e Kuchek Latif Allah | Chal-e Mohammad Hoseyn-e Sofla | Chal-e Monar | Chal-e Sangha | Chaleh Tak | Cham Arab | Cham Chit | Cham Chulian | Cham Dalan | Cham Dogham | Cham Faraj | Cham Golak | Cham Hajjian | Cham Hashem-e Dehqan | Cham Kalgeh | Cham Karteh | Cham Kharnub | Cham Khazam-e Do | Cham Khazam-e Yek | Cham Konar | Cham Konar | Cham Konar | Cham Lavand | Cham Lishan | Cham Mardas | Cham Morad | Cham Nezami | Cham ol Obeyd | Cham Pol Baraftab | Cham Qasemali-ye Yek | Cham Rahman | Cham Reyhan | Cham Seyyed Mohammad | Cham Tang | Cham Tangu | Cham | Cham | Chaman Laleh | Chaman | Chamban | Chambareh | Chambeh | Cham-e Anayeh | Cham-e Araban Do | Cham-e Dehqan | Cham-e Eshag | Cham-e Hashem | Cham-e Mahavi | Cham-e Menaf | Cham-e Seyyed Latif | Cham-e Siah | Cham-e Sobbi | Chamian | Chamim | Chamm ol Hamid | Chamran | Chamtar Khan-e Olya | Chamtar Khan-e Sofla | Chamum-e Bughar | Chanibeh-ye Do | Chanibeh-ye Yek | Chapkuh | Charat | Chareh | Chargeli | Chashni Dan | Chavani Ab Bahar | Chavibdeh | Chay Avafi | Chay Sudan | Chay Varsham | Chebseh-ye Bozorg | Chebseh-ye Kuchek | Chegarman | Chegarman-e Gholamhoseyn | Chegha Cheshmeh | Chegha Meleh | Chehchel | Chehel Mani | Chehel Tanan | Chehjam | Chel Gasheh | Chel Rubah | Chel Shah Heydar Aqa | Chelisad | Chelun | Chelvir | Chenar | Chenarestan | Cheru | Cheshmeh Ab | Cheshmeh Abdollah | Cheshmeh Ab-e Neya | Cheshmeh Ali-ye Kayedan | Cheshmeh Badir | Cheshmeh Chelvar | Cheshmeh Gorgi | Cheshmeh Haqqi | Cheshmeh Khatun | Cheshmeh Morad | Cheshmeh Rugheni | Cheshmeh Sheykh | Cheshmeh Shirin | Cheshmeh Shirin | Cheshmeh Shirin | Cheshmeh Zaluvak | Cheshmeh-ye Cham Nezami | Chezi-ye Olya | Chichali Gholamreza | Chidan | Chin Owlak | Chin-e Ruzah | Chini | Chit Anbeh | Chiti | Chiveh | Chizandan | Chogha Sorkh | Choghamish | Chol Chol Chal | Cholchelak | Choli | Choveys-e Do | Choveys-e Seh | Choveys-e Yek |Chul Zeyar | Chul | Chulaki | Chulaki | Chulaneh | Chumeh Tupchi Masjid | Chumeh-ye Khazaliyeh | Chumeh-ye Kuchak | Chumeh-ye Seyyed Alvan | Chuzah | Chuzu

=== D ===
Dab Amir | Dabuhiyeh | Dafar-e Olya | Daghagheleh | Daghagheleh | Daham | Dahimi-ye Do | Dahimi-ye Do | Dahimi-ye Seh | Dahimi-ye Yek | Dahimi-ye Yek | Dal | Dalan | Dalas | Dalgeh | Dali Owlad Mohammad Hoseyn | Dali Padiguleh | Dali | Dalu Zahra | Dam Ab | Dam Ab | Dam Ab-e Kashan | Dam Aftab | Dam Boz | Dam Tang Chendar Chavil | Dameh | Dameshgaft | Damgheh-ye Bozorg | Damgheh-ye Kuchek | Damtang-e Putu | Dar Alai | Dar Bahareh | Darak | Daravizeh | Darb | Darb Kazem | Darband-e Gharbi | Darb-e Abu ol Abbas | Darb-e Shesh Ab | Darbeh-ye Gharibi | Darchal | Darchali | Dargi | Darhupal | Dari Dun | Darihak | Darisiyeh-ye Olya | Darisiyeh-ye Sofla | Darisiyeh-ye Vosta | Darkhazineh | Darkhoveyn | Darmeleh | Darnaruk | Darreh Abineh | Darreh Ahvazi | Darreh Alikhun | Darreh Anar | Darreh Banehha | Darreh Barik | Darreh Barik | Darreh Bazar | Darreh Bid | Darreh Bonyab | Darreh Buri | Darreh Chineh | Darreh Dazi | Darreh Dozdan | Darreh Dun | Darreh Dun | Darreh Eshgaft | Darreh Eshkaft-e Sarak | Darreh Gharib | Darreh Goli | Darreh Jehud | Darreh Kat | Darreh Khar Zahreh | Darreh Khoshk | Darreh Khoshk | Darreh Khoshk-e Hatemvand | Darreh Khoshk-e Jafarvand | Darreh Khun-e Faleh | Darreh Lir | Darreh Murd | Darreh Ney | Darreh Ney | Darreh Ney-ye Olya | Darreh Ney-ye Sofla | Darreh Pahn | Darreh Qaleh | Darreh Qir | Darreh Qobad | Darreh Shur | Darreh Sohrab | Darreh Tu Nem Nemi | Darreh Tu-ye Olya | Darreh Zang | Darreh Zang | Darreh Zard | Darreh Zeydi | Darreh-ye Arabha | Darreh-ye Banvar | Darreh-ye Barik | Darreh-ye Bariki | Darreh-ye Baruk | Darreh-ye Behzad | Darreh-ye Chinayi | Darreh-ye Gandoli | Darreh-ye Garmabeh | Darreh-ye Gayelan | Darreh-ye Karteh | Darreh-ye Khalk | Darreh-ye Lebad | Darreh-ye Lirgeh Durak | Darreh-ye Na | Darreh-ye Pir | Darreh-ye Qila Tahemasbi | Darreh-ye Rizi | Darreh-ye Talkh | Darreh-ye Tangar | Darunak | Darvish Saidi | Darvishabad | Darvishan | Darvishan-e Yek | Darvishi | Darvishiyeh | Daryas | Darzard | Dasht Avzar | Dasht Mal | Dasht-e Bozorg | Dasht-e Denayik | Dasht-e Gorgan | Dasht-e Laleh | Dasht-e Roba | Dashti-ye Hoseyn Aqa | Dasmurt | Dast Kortan | Dast-e Ney | Dayer | Deh Balai | Deh Darbeh | Deh Di | Deh Gah | Deh Gah | Deh Gharati | Deh Iji | Deh Kian | Deh Kohneh-e Dowbalutan | Deh Kohneh-ye Muzarm | Deh Murd | Deh Now | Deh Now-ye Kizavak | Deh Rakhda | Deh Sir | Dehdez | Deh-e Alireza | Deh-e Daran | Deh-e Darreh | Deh-e Dik | Deh-e Ebrahim | Deh-e Howz | Deh-e Julan | Deh-e Kohneh | Deh-e Miran | Deh-e Molla Bozorg | Deh-e Molla Kuchek | Deh-e Now | Deh-e Now | Deh-e Nowruz | Deh-e Saria | Deh-e Seyyed Ahmad | Deh-e Sheykh | Dehgah | Dehgah-e Gaheshlun | Dehgah-e Lalmir | Dehgah-e Tapi | Dehkadeh | Dehlaviyeh | Dehliz | Dehliz-e Do | Dehliz-e Yek | Dehloran | Dehnow | Dehyur | Dehzanun | Dej Marij | Dela | Deleh Chenar | Delli-ye Cheman | Delli-ye Mohsaleh Aqa | Delli-ye Solmavand | Deraz Darreh | Derb-e Murgah | Derb-e Ruz Ali | Deykudarkhalk | Deylam | Deylam-e Jadid | Deylam-e Olya | Deym Ebn-e Najm | Deymeh Kamar | Deymehtoru | Deymeh-ye Dagher | Deymeh-ye Kuchek | Deymeh-ye Yaqub | Deyowni | Dezab | Dezful | Didar Qoli | Didargah-e Olya | Didargah-e Sofla | Diduni | Dikdan | Dilam Dasht | Dimeh Darb | Dimeh-ye Ban Said | Dimeh-ye Karim | Dimeh-ye Shakraleh | Dimgeh-ye Tang Chavil | Dimu | Do Ab-e Huran | Do Balutan | Do Balutan | Do Band | Do Gacheh | Do Gacheh | Do Gush | Do Kuhak | Do Piran | Do Piran | Do Rahi-ye Eslamabad | Dobb-e Hardan | Dobb-e Moleyhem | Dobb-e Said | Dohul | Dolfiyeh | Dow Dangeh-ye Bozorg | Dow Dangeh-ye Kuchak | Dowlatabad | Dowlatabad | Dowrun | Dowshalvari | Duderun | Dul Dava | Dul Siah | Dul Taher | Dul Tak | Dul Zangi | Dul-e Gap | Dulgan | Dulijan | Duneh | Duparun | Dupuk Ansari | Durak Zenan-e Olya | Durak Zenan-e Sofla | Durak | Duri Kal | Durtu | Durudeh

=== E ===
Ebadat-e Do | Ebadat-e Yek | Ebrahim | Edrisi-ye Olya | Edrisi-ye Sofla | Egleh | Eidi Mordeh-ye Bala | Eidi Mordeh-ye Pain | Eleyas | Elhayi | Em Agaleh Seyyed Sabus | Emam Reza | Emam Safi | Emam-e Seh | Emamzadeh Abdollah | Emamzadeh Baba Ahmad | Emamzadeh Bowyer | Emamzadeh Khazar | Emamzadeh Mohammad | Emamzadeh Shahzadeh Abdollah | Enayati-ye Bala | Enayati-ye Paeen | Enayati-ye Vasat | Esfandiar | Eshgaft-e Baba Mir | Eshgaft-e Baraftab | Eshgaft-e Gav | Eshgaft-e Jamushi | Eshgaft-e Kahdun | Eshgaft-e Khorma | Eshgaft-e Mamadali Khan | Eshgaft-e Mona | Eshgaft-e Tavileh | Eshgaft-e Zard | Eslamabad | Eslamabad | Eslamabad | Eslamabad | Eslamabad | Eslamabad | Eslamabad | Eslamabad | Eslamabad | Eslamabad-e Do | Eslamabad-e Olya | Eslamabad-e Sofla | Esmailiyeh-ye Do | Esmailiyeh-ye Yek | Estak | Estil | Eyleh-ye Yek | Eyn Korreh | Eyn ol Mejibel | Eyn ol Zaman | Eyn-e Do | Eyn-e Haddad | Eyn-e Hammad | Eyn-e Yebareh | Eyshan

=== F ===
Fahad | Falat | Faleh | Faleh-e Sarqaleh | Falihi | Falij Dunar | Farahan Kabar | Farahani | Farajabad | Farajabad | Faramarz | Fargh Zayer | Farhadabad | Farheh | Farhudiyeh | Farrokh Pey | Farsiat-e Bozorg | Farsiat-e Kuchek | Farsiyeh | Farsiyeh | Farsiyeh-ye Do | Faryab-e Masjid | Farzad va Kahzad | Fathabad | Fathi | Fayazi | Fayyazabad | Fay-ye Sofla | Fazleh | Fenikhi | Ferdowsabad | Fereyduni | Fergeh | Feyay | Feyyeh-ye Shavardi | Feyzollah | Filab | Firuzabad | Firuzabad | Firuzabad | Fozeyli

=== G ===
Gach Gorsa | Gachestan | Gad-e Kuh | Gahen-e Shavamel | Galal | Galalak | Galeh Bardar | Galeh Chogah | Galeh Har | Galleh Chendar | Galleh Dasht Lir | Galleh Gah | Galleh Khar | Galleh Vari | Galleh-ye Meshk | Gambueh-ye Bozorg | Gambueh-ye Kuchek | Gameh Tarap | Gamnab | Gandikar | Gandomriz | Ganjabad | Gar Kandi | Garab | Garab-e Olya | Garak | Garavand-e Sofla | Gardab-e Do | Gardab-e Yek | Gardan Taq | Gardesh | Gargar-e Sofla | Gargari-ye Olya | Gargari-ye Sofla | Gargeh | Garishiyeh | Garmamir-e Bala | Garmeh | Garmeh-ye Khorusi | Garmez-e Olya | Garmez-e Sofla | Garmtun | Garteshmal Talkor | Gasti | Gat | Gav Sukhteh | Gavdaran-e Sofla | Gavdari-ye Hormozi | Gavkadeh | Gavmir | Gavmishabad | Gavmishabad | Gavmishabad | Gavmishabad-e Sharqi | Gavmishabad-e Sheykh Hosun | Gazegah | Gazin | Gelalak | Gelalak | Geleh | Geraiyeh | Gerd Bisheh | Gerdab | Germat | Gesvan-e Do | Gesvan-e Seh | Gesvan-e Yek | Getrani | Geydari | Gezeli-ye Sofla | Ghadir Habseh | Ghadir-e Sab | Ghafel | Ghalim | Ghanem | Ghanemiyeh-ye Isa | Gharabad | Gharganeh | Gharib-e Deylam-e Sofla | Ghasha va Shiryul | Ghazaleh-ye Do | Ghazaviyeh-ye Bozorg | Ghazaviyeh-ye Kuchek | Ghazban | Ghazbaniyeh | Gheysiyeh | Gheyzaniyeh-ye Bozorg | Ghiazi | Ghofeyleh | Ghol Gholab Balayi | Gholam Hoseyn-e Hafezi | Gholamali | Gholamreza | Ghomijeh | Ghorabi | Ghoreybeh | Ghoveyleh-ye Naqed | Ghoveyleh-ye Sadat | Ghovil | Ghuleh-ye Olya | Gilan | Giveh Doran | Gobeyr | Gobeyr-e Do | Gobeyr-e Seh | Gobeyr-e Yek | Gobeyr-e Zahir | Godar Chiti | Godar Pahn | Gohar | Gol Aspidi | Gol Gonjan | Gol Mohak | Gol Sefid | Gol Sefid | Golabundan-e Olya | Golabundan-e Sofla | Golbahar | Golestan | Golgir | Goli Khun | Golkapargeh | Golkhaneh | Gombazun | Gomyek-e Sofla | Gomyek-e Vosta | Gonbad | Gonbadlaran | Gondamakar | Gondek-e Hasan | Gondek-e Isa | Gondek-e Seh | Gor Gor | Gordlidan | Gorgeh | Goriz-e Karidi | Goriziyeh | Gosad | Goteysh | Gotvand | Gowd Gach-e Olya | Gowd Gach-e Sofla | Gowd-e Azhdar | Gudanjir | Gudgel Chavil | Gur Khar | Gur Parviz | Gurab Dagchi | Gurab | Gurab | Gurab | Gurab-e Sorkh | Gur-e Hasanali | Guriyeh | Gursharan Owsta | Gusheh | Gut Muri | Guyileh | Guz Bilva Hajji Nasrallah

=== H ===
Hababeh-ye Olya | Hababeh-ye Sofla | Hababeh-ye Vosta | Habaiyeh | Habibabad | Habibabad | Habishi | Hadameh-ye Olya | Hadameh-ye Vosta | Hadbeh | Haddam-e Do | Haddam-e Yek | Hadi Khani | Hadiabad | Hadid | Haffar | Haffar-e Sharqi | Haft Cheshmeh | Haft Shahidan | Haft Tappeh | Haftkel | Hajj Abdeh Mohammad | Hajj Ali Hiki | Hajj Karim | Hajj Khassaf | Hajj Mariyeh | Hajj Salar | Hajjati | Hajj-e Saleh-e Lusi | Hajji Aqa | Hajji Javad | Hajji Kamal | Hajji Moharab | Hajjiabad | Hajjiabad | Hajjiabad | Hajjiyeh | Halaf-e Do | Halaf-e Seh | Halaf-e Yek | Halaleh-ye Manzel | Halkun | Halveh | Halvehhani | Hamadan Seljeh | Hamid Assad Khan | Hamidabad | Hamidabad | Hamidan | Hamidaniyeh | Hamidi | Hamidiyeh | Hamidiyeh | Hamireh | Hamisheh Behar | Hammad | Hammam | Hamud-e Asi | Hamudi | Hamudi-ye Sadun | Hamuleh | Hamzeh | Hamzeh-ye Olya | Hamzeh-ye Sofla | Hanatiyeh | Hanishiyeh | Hanushi | Hanzaleh | Harbayeh-ye Shalageh | Harbazchellow | Hargenush | Hariyeh | Harkaleh | Harkaleh-ye Mohammad Jafar | Harkaleh-ye Mohammadabad | Harkaleh-ye Monari | Hasan Ali Darreh Forkh | Hasan Hajji | Hasan Heydar | Hasan Qoli Khan | Hasanabad | Hasanabad | Hasan-e Mazlum | Hasasaneh-ye Bala | Hasasaneh-ye Pain | Hashcheh-ye Makineh | Hashcheh-ye Olya | Hashcheh-ye Sofla | Hati | Havir | Hayatabad-e Khalifeh | Hayatabad-e Majidi | Hayaviyeh | Hazarat Ali | Hazbeh | Heddeh | Helleh va Delleh | Hendijan | Herbow | Hesamabad | Hesar | Heydarabad | Heydarabad | Hezar Mani-ye Olya | Hezar Mani-ye Sofla | Hezarmishi | Hobeysh | Hodbeh | Hofireh | Hofireh-ye Hajji Barbeyn | Hofireh-ye Olya | Homeyla | Honeyri-ye Do | Honeyri-ye Seh | Honeyri-ye Yek | Horeh-ye Agul-e Bala | Horijeh | Horr | Horrat ol Abbas | Horriyeh | Hoseyn Aqa | Hoseyn Beygi | Hoseyn Dahish | Hoseyn Farakhi | Hoseyn Ghalayem | Hoseyn Khun | Hoseyn Mashlush | Hoseyn Nahaz | Hoseyn Qoli | Hoseynabad | Hoseynabad | Hoseynabad | Hoseynabad | Hoseynabad | Hoseynabad-e Sheykh | Hoseyni | Hoseyniyeh | Hoseyniyeh-ye Khazir | Hoseyniyeh-ye Mir Shenan | Hoseyniyeh-ye Olya | Hoveyleh | Hoveysh | Hoveysh-e Jadid | Hoveysh-e Neys | Hoveyzeh | Howz Gel | Hufel | Hufel | Hufel-e Gharbi | Hufel-e Seyyed Hamad | Hufel-e Sharqi | Huni Sefid | Hureh Emir | Hureh |

=== I ===
IRIB Transmitting Station | Ispareh | Istadegi | Istgah-e Gor Gor | Istgah-e Khosravi | Istgah-e Rah Ahan-e Haft Tappeh | Istgah-e Rah Ahan-e Shush | Izeh

=== J ===
Ja Ordu | Jaaveleh | Jabbar Abd ol Emam | Jaberabad | Jaberi | Jabrabad | Jadvalkun | Jafar Qoli | Jafarabad | Jafar-e Sadeq | Jafari-ye Shebeshi | Jaffal | Jafir | Jafir-e Do | Jahangerd | Jahangiri | Jahangiri-ye Olya | Jahangiri-ye Sofla | Jaju | Jalaliyeh Jonubi | Jalaliyeh Shomali | Jalieh | Jalizav | Jalizi-ye Abdolreza | Jalizi-ye Hanzaleh | Jam | Jamal Jahan | Jamalabad | Jameh | Jan Ali | Jangeh | Jannat Makan | Jannat Makan | Jariyeh-e Seyyed Mohammad | Jariyeh-ye Seyyed Musa | Jaru | Jassaniyeh-ye Bozorg | Jassaniyeh-ye Kuchek | Jateh | Javad-e Seyyedi | Jayezan | Jayezan-e Kohneh | Jazestan Pareh | Jazestan | Jeh Jeh | Jehjeh | Jelieh | Jelogir | Jijil | Jiri-ye Sofla | Jodeydeh | Joghghal-e Aviyeh | Joghghal-e Khvayeh | Jongiyeh | Jorgeh-ye Seyyed Ali | Jovi-ye Majid | Jow Kanak | Jowkar | Jowkar | Jubaji | Jughband | Juhi | Julahi | Julaki | Juler | Jurvand

=== K ===
Kabak Mohammad Reza | Kabutaran | Kabutargeran | Kabutari | Kabutari | Kadim | Kaediyeh | Kaeydeh | Kafisheh | Kaft Chahvar | Kaft Galleh Duk | Kaft-e Galeh Vari | Kahbad-e Do | Kahbad-e Yek | Kahriz | Kahrla | Kahshur-e Ali Nazer | Kahshur-e Davud Ali | Kahshur-e Olya | Kaj Kolah | Kakarud | Kal Ahmadi | Kal Bid | Kal Chenar | Kal Chevil | Kal Duzakh-e Do | Kal Duzakh-e Yek | Kal Jahan | Kal Khongak-e Bozorg | Kal Khungestan | Kal Khvajeh | Kal Khvajeh-ye Sofla | Kal Mohammad Hoseyn | Kal Narges | Kal Narges-e Karanj | Kal | Kalak Khan | Kalbali Arab | Kal-e Babadi | Kal-e Boland | Kal-e Chunek | Kal-e Naqd Ali | Kalgadarreh-ye Do | Kalgadarreh-ye Yek | Kalgah Chavil | Kalgeh | Kalgeh Zar | Kalkal | Kalkhengak | Kalleh Pir | Kalleh Sir | Kalleh Zarb | Kalleh-ye Yari | Kalmat-e Shalu | Kaltandar-e Olya | Kaltandar-e Sofla | Kamar Ab | Kamar Deraz | Kamarsheh Seyyedi Dallah | Kamtuleh-ye Shahriari | Kamtuleh-ye Yusefabad | Kan Gonjeshki | Kandgah | Kanegrun | Kangarestan | Kani | Kanjigan | Karanj | Karanj | Karbalai Qasemali | Kardef | Kareh Pa | Kareh | Karfanj | Karg Ab | Karidi | Karim Moharab | Karim Musa | Karimabad | Karimabad | Karimabad | Karimabad | Karimabad | Karimabad | Karimdowlati | Karim-e Saleh | Karkaran | Karta | Kartaz | Kartel | Karvansara | Kat Bosteh | Kat Kiyars | Kataf-e Nashalil | Katak | Kavater | Kaydan | Kayid Ali Khan | Kazem Hamd | Kazem-e Heydar | Kazem-e Mohammad | Kazemi-ye Do | Kazemi-ye Khalaf | Kazemi-ye Yek | Keft Gol Anbar | Keft Kalkhanek | Keftegalleh | Kelasmadin-e Do | Kelasmadin-e Yek | Keli Malek | Kesar | Ketf-e Gusheh | Ketf-e Zeytun | Keykavus | Keyup | Khadijeh | Khafur | Khalaf Aziz | Khalaf-e Mosallam | Khalafiat | Khalifeh-ye Heydar | Khalteh | Kham Kar | Kham Karabad-e Galleh Tavak | Khamas | Khamasi | Khan Koshteh | Khar Farih-e Olya | Kharabeh-ye Sadat | Kharestan-e Olya | Kharestan-e Sofla | Kharmizan | Khashab | Khashab | Khashan | Khasheh | Khasraj-e Beyt-e Qashem | Khasraj-e Khalaf | Khasraj-e Mezban | Khasraj-e Owdeh | Khasraj-e Razi Mohammad | Khassafiat | Khavar-e Seyyed Khalaf | Khayiz | Khazalabad | Khazaliyeh | Khazami | Khazar-e Do | Khazar-e Seh | Khazar-e Yek | Khazineh | Khazineh-ye Olya | Khaziriat | Khenziri | Kher Khereh | Khersheh | Kheyrabad-e Gohar | Kheyrabad-e Sani | Kheyt ol Rovas | Kheyt | Kheyt-e Amareh | Kheyt-e Zobeyd | Khezeriyeh | Khimeh Gah | Khimeh Ja | Khobeyneh-ye Olya | Khobeyneh-ye Sofla | Khoda Karam | Khomeyn | Khomeys | Khomos | Khong Azhdar | Khong Azhdar-e Ali Ayavel | Khong Kamalvand | Khong Karam Alivand | Khong Yar Alivand | Khoreybeh | Khorramshahr | Khorusi-ye Jonubi | Khorusi-ye Shomali | Khosraviyeh | Khosrow | Khoveynes | Khoveyseh | Khoveyseh | Khovis | Khowzineh-ye Bala | Khowzineh-ye Baqer | Khvajeh Anvar | Khvajeh Khezr | Khvajehabad | Ki Geh | Kilanj | Kimeh | Kiruh | Kofeysheh | Koheysh | Kohleh-ye Do | Kohleh-ye Yek | Kohnab | Kohnab-e Bala | Kohnak | Kohneh Bahrami | Kolesheh | Kombardeh | Konar Dun-e Olya | Konar Helaleh | Konar Pir | Konar-e Hashtlik | Kondek-e Khanjar | Konfeh | Konjadkar | Konjed Kar | Korai-ye Olya | Korai-ye Sofla | Kordestan-e Bozorg | Kordestan-e Kuchek | Koreyt-e Borumi | Kornas | Korreh Siah-e Shirin | Korreh Siah-e Talkh | Kowsar | Kowsareh | Kuchkun | Kuh Borideh Shelal | Kuh Gandom | Kuh Zar | Kuheh-ye Do | Kuheh-ye Yek | Kuhran | Kul Chenar | Kul Huni | Kul Kandi | Kul Khodadad | Kul Murd | Kul Papa | Kul Sira | Kul Sorkh | Kul Sorkh-e Lirasad | Kul Tak Durak | Kulak-e Bordabal | Kul-e Jaz | Kul-e Shah | Kuleh Jaz | Kuli Alikhan | Kuli Alireza | Kuli Bakhtiari | Kuli Khoda Karam | Kuli Rostam | Kulizeh Jaber | Kulor | Kun Sorkh | Kungerdeh | Kuri | Kushk Darreh | Kushk | Kushkak | Kushkak-e Kushk | Kushk-e Aqa Jan | Kushki Do | Kutak-e Jajji Aqa | Kutak-e Mohammad Karim | Kut-e Abdollah | Kut-e Mahna | Kut-e Navaser | Kut-e Said | Kut-e Seyyed Enayat | Kut-e Seyyed Naim | Kut-e Seyyed Saleh | Kut-e Seyyed Soltan | Kut-e Shannuf | Kut-e Sheykh | Kuy-e Montazeri | Kuy-e Vali Aser

=== L ===
Lab Sefid-e Olya | Lab Sefid-e Sofla | Labab | Laderaz | Laderazi | Lagelal-e Nurabad | Lagolzar | Lah Bid | Lahbid | Lahemir | Lakabad | Lakom | Lakurgan | Lalab | Lalar | Lali | Landeh | Lang Varkshi | Langar-e Jadid | Langar-e Qadim | Lapui-ye Do | Lapui-ye Yek | Larm | Larzandan | Lasbid | Lashgargah | Latia | Latif | Lazeh | Limuchi | Lir Kuyu-ye Now | Lir Sorkhi | Lirab | Lirharan | Lirik | Lirkhun | Lirsiah-e Shapuri | Lirzard | Lishasi | Lives | Lizi | Longir-e Olya | Longir-e Sofla | Longir-e Vosta | Loran | Lotfabad | Lotfabad | Lovai | Lowlow | Ludan | Ludarreh |

=== M ===
Machriyeh | Madinat | Madineh | Mafgeh | Magah Taneh Abul | Magah Taneh Morad | Magarnat-e Do | Magarnat-e Seh | Magarnat-e Yek | Magasis | Magtaf | Magteyeber | Magtu | Magtu | Mah Now | Mah Sonboli | Mahamid | Mahareb | Mahdiyeh | Mahmid | Mahmud Ali | Mahmud Khan | Mahmudabad | Mahmudabad-e Gomar | Mahreh Dun | Mahrugi-ye Olya | Mahrugi-ye Sofla | Mahur Berenji-ye Olya | Mahur Berenji-ye Sofla | Mahur | Mahur-e Chah Gandali | Majid Abdollah | Majid Zamedi | Majnun | Makaniyeh-ye Salahaviyeh | Makineh-ye Khar Farih | Maksar | Maksar-e Magatif | Maksar-e Olya | Maksar-e Sofla | Maksar-e Vosta | Mal Aqa | Malakeh | Mal-e Kayid | Maleheh | Malek Morad | Maleki | Malekiyeh-ye Gharbi | Malekiyeh-ye Olya | Malekiyeh-ye Sofla | Malekiyeh-ye Vosta | Malich-e Bozorg | Malich-e Kuchek | Maliget | Malihan | Maliheh Kut-e Sad | Maliheh Olumi | Maliheh-ye Do | Maliheh-ye Hajj Badr | Maliheh-ye Sadun | Maliheh-ye Sharqi | Maliheh-ye Yek | Maliheh-ye Yek | Mallah | Malsaidi-ye Olya | Malsaidi-ye Sofla | Malviran | Mamatin-e Olya | Mamatin-e Sofla | Mamili | Mamlah-ye Olya | Man Seyr | Manazel Sazmani | Mandani | Mandeh Ab | Mandeniabad | Maneyshad | Mangelas-e Bozorg | Mangushi | Manhush | Mani Yar | Manjir | Mansur Beygi | Mansureh-ye Kanin | Mansureh-ye Mazi | Mansureh-ye Olya | Mansureh-ye Sadat | Mansuri | Mansuriyeh | Mansuriyeh-ye Do | Mansuriyeh-ye Sadat | Mansuriyeh-ye Seh | Mansuriyeh-ye Yek | Maqate | Maqtu-e Olya | Maqtu-e Sofla | Maqtu-e Vosta | Marashi | Maravaneh | Maraveneh-ye Chahar | Maraveneh-ye Do | Maraveneh-ye Seh | Maraveneh-ye Yek | Marbachcheh | Mared | Margha | Mari | Marireh | Markaz-e Garm | Marun Seh | Marun-e Jayezan | Marzeh | Masharageh | Mashgiri | Mashhad | Mashhadi Mohammad | Mashhadi | Mashi | Mashkar | Mashlush | Masiniyeh-ye Olya | Masiniyeh-ye Sofla | Masiri | Masjed Soleyman | Maslavi | Masudi Al Safar | Masudi | Masudi-ye Do | Matui | Maveh | Maveh | Mavi-ye Olya | Mavi-ye Sofla | Mayi Bas | Mazal Zamedi | Mazal | Mazandeh | Mazarandeh | Mazban | Mazeh Gargasht | Mazeh Pariyab | Mazeh Qola | Mazeh Sarvemam Qoli | Mazer Ab Anari | Mazibaleh-ye Sofla | Mazraeh | Mazravi | Mazu | Medad | Mehdi Seyyed Anayt | Mehdiabad | Mehdiabad | Mehdiabad-e Kalak Shuran | Mehrabad | Mehranan | Mehranan-e Heydari | Melleh-ye Gurab | Menareh Barangerd | Menazel Sazmani | Meshelsheh-ye Olya | Meshelsheh-ye Sofla | Meydan Tarreh Barahvaz | Meydan | Meydan-e Khodaverdi | Meydan-e Tayyareh | Meydavud-e Olya | Meydavud-e Sofla | Meydavud-e Vosta | Mezlageh-ye Sofla | Mian Ab | Mian Bisheh | Mian Chak-e Talkor | Mian Galalan | Mian Kal | Miangaran | Miangaran-e Olya | Miangaran-e Sofla | Mianpilun | Mianrud | Michatun | Mihanabad | Mil Pay Mil | Minushahr | Mir Ahmad | Mirzaali Khan | Mishkeh | Mitangun | Mizureh | Moamereh | Moammareh | Moammereh | Mobaraki-ye Do | Mobaraki-ye Seh | Mobarezabad | Mobeytiheh-ye Do | Mobeytiheh-ye Seh | Mochriyeh | Modbeg | Moedeleh-ye Olya | Moeydeleh-ye Sofla | Mogheytiyeh | Mohammad Ali | Mohammad Ali | Mohammad Aqa Aqajari | Mohammad Ghazban | Mohammad Kazemi | Mohammad Khan | Mohammad Safi | Mohammad Safiyeh | Mohammad Shoqati | Mohammad Taqi | Mohammadabad | Mohammadabad | Mohammadabad | Mohammadabad | Mohammadi | Mohanna | Mohanna | Mohanna | Mohavvaleh-ye Abu Hadij | Moheydar | Mohseniyeh | Molashiyeh-ye Seh | Molashiyeh-ye Yek | Molla Abdollah | Molla Emir | Molla Mehdi | Molla Vali | Mollasani | Mombin | Moni Sar | Monikh | Monjafkeh | Monjvek | Moqamsiyeh | Moqavemat | Morad Beygi | Moradabad | Moradabad | Morez-e Bani Saleh | Mortezaabad | Morvari | Mosaffa | Mosallamiyeh | Mosharageh | Mosharrafeh-ye Bozorg | Mosharrafeh-ye Kuchak | Mosharrahat | Mostufaabad | Motbeg-e Olya | Motbeg-e Sofla | Motbeg-e Vosta | Motir | Mozaffariyeh | Muilheh-ye Olya | Muilheh-ye Sofla | Muilheh-ye Vosta | Mulali | Muleh | Muli | Mului | Munak | Mundoni | Muran | Murd | Murd | Murd | Murd-e Ghaffar | Murd-e Sadat | Murgeh | Muri | Muzan

=== N ===
Nabi Allah | Nabi | Naddafiyeh | Nafer | Naft Sefid | Nagazeh-ye Bozorg | Nagazeh-ye Kuchak | Nahirat | Nahr-e Abu Azim | Nahr-e Abu Dahan | Nahr-e Abu Felfel | Nahr-e Abu Shanak | Nahr-e Afadeleh | Nahr-e Ariz | Nahr-e Azraq | Nahr-e Dalli | Nahr-e Ebn Arbeyd | Nahr-e Ebn Naser-e Sofla | Nahr-e Gabin-e Olya | Nahr-e Gabin-e Sofla | Nahr-e Hajji Mohammad | Nahr-e Hamid | Nahr-e Hamud | Nahr-e Homeyseh | Nahr-e Hoseyn | Nahr-e Jadid | Nahr-e Jarrah | Nahr-e Karim | Nahr-e Khvaf | Nahr-e Kut | Nahr-e Kut | Nahr-e Masjed | Nahr-e Meseyyer | Nahr-e Mochri | Nahr-e Mohoseyn | Nahr-e Mosallam | Nahr-e Naser | Nahr-e Owj Albu Seyyed | Nahr-e Owj Albuhieh | Nahr-e Rahmeh | Nahr-e Saleh | Nahr-e Salim | Nahr-e Sen | Nahr-e Seyyed | Nahr-e Seyyed Yusef | Nahr-e Shanaveh | Nahr-e Sheykh | Nahr-e Soltan | Nahr-e Tolayeb | Nahr-e Vasleh | Nahriyeh | Naimiyeh | Naimiyeh-ye Seyyed Naser | Najafqoli | Najm-e Divan | Nal Eshkanun | Nal-e Kanan | Nam Niha | Namak Talkeh-ye Rashnow | Nameh Beyt Hardan | Namnak | Napiabad | Naqishiat-e Do | Naqishiat-e Yek | Naqsheh-ye Hir | Naqsheh-ye Nasar | Narges-e Batuli | Nargesi | Nargesi | Nargestan-e Alishah | Naseh-ye Tanbaku Kar | Naser Balivand | Naser Khosrow | Naserabad | Naseri | Nasir | Nasrollahabad | Nehzatabad | Nepyan | Nesar-e Sipeh | Nesareh-ye Bozorg | Nesareh-ye Kuchek | Nesharnaymeh | Neshar-ye Do | Ney Nardeban | Ney Siah | Neydovand | Neyzar-e Olya | Neyzar-e Sofla | Nezeheh | Nim Mardi | Nis | Nobgan | Nomreh Yek-e Bala | Nomreh Yek-e Pain | Nomreh-ye Davazdah | Nomreh-ye Do | Nomreh-ye Noh | Nomreh-ye Seh-e Kupal | Nomreh-ye Yazdah | Nomreh-ye Yek | Now Dar | Nowshad | Nowshadi | Nowshivand | Nowtarki-ye Gharibi | Nowtarki-ye Mokhtari | Nowtarki-ye Tahmasebi | Nur Ali | Nurabad | Nurabad | Nurabad | Nuran

=== O ===
Obeyyat | Obudehalis | Omeyshiyeh-ye Bozorg | Omidiyeh | Omm Arqal-e Yek | Omm ol Azam | Omm ol Balabil | Omm ol Ejaj | Omm ol Emamid | Omm ol Gharib-e Bozorg | Omm ol Gharib-e Kuchek | Omm ol Ghezlan | Omm ol Ghezlan | Omm ol Hejar | Omm ol Helianeh | Omm ol Heyal | Omm ol Khareyn | Omm ol Khassa-ye Olya | Omm ol Khassa-ye Sofla | Omm ol Khassa-ye Vosta | Omm ol Safayeh-ye Do | Omm ol Safayeh-ye Yek | Omm ol Sakhar | Omm ol Sakhar | Omm ol Savad | Omm ol Tarfeh | Omnowsheh | Oqleh Miah | Ordowt-e Darvish | Ordowt-e Kal | Ordowt-e Nazer | Orzu | Oseyf | Oshtor Gard | Owdeh | Owlad

=== P ===
Pa Ab-e Shelal | Pa Derazan | Pa Gach-e Lahbari | Pabil Kani | Pach Kula | Pacheh Kuh Zilay Idi | Pachel Chalavaz | Pachenar | Padegan-e Khosrowabad | Padya | Pagach | Pagachi-ye Bahmai | Pagachi-ye Mambini | Pagachi-ye Markazi | Pagahi | Pagin | Pakurpi-ye Sofla | Palang Ab | Palim | Pamalich | Pameleh | Pamenar | Panj Mil | Papiabad | Par Chunak | Par Khalil | Par Neveshteh-ye Yek | Par Siah | Par Surakh | Par Surakh | Paradis | Parak | Parchak | Parchestan-e Al Kalu | Parchestan-e Ali Hoseyn Molla | Parchestan-e Fazel | Parchestan-e Gurui | Parchestan-e Owrak Shalu | Pardeh | Pareh Kabud | Pareh | Parivach Zabandi Kayi | Parzard | Pas Deh | Pas Kareh | Pas Kul | Pas Tang | Paschat | Pashgar | Patak-e Beygdeli | Patak-e Jalali | Patakht-e Shah Mohammad | Pataveh | Pataveh | Patehla | Patuf | Pay Kuh Mollah | Pay Rah-e Chal Balutak | Pay Risheh Kuh | Pay Takht-e Varzard | Pay Takht-e Zal | Pay-e Rah | Pa-ye Takht-e Golzar | Pa-ye Takht-e Talkor | Paygah-e Panjam Shakari | Payrah Chal-e Monar | Pay-ye Qaleh | Peneti | Perchelehzar | Pian-e Olya | Pian-e Sofla | Piazkar | Pifeh | Pir Fazak | Pir Gari | Pir Mahmud | Pir Musa | Pir Vali | Piranshahi | Pirdalu | Piruzabad | Pol Borideh | Pol-e Abdugh | Pol-e Azh | Pol-e Bala Rud | Pol-e Negin | Pol-e Now | Pol-e Parzin | Pol-e Zal | Poli | Poli | Porzinastan | Posht Asiab | Posht Chagah Taraz | Posht Darb-e Olya | Posht Darb-e Sofla | Posht Darb-e Vosta | Posht Par | Posht-e Pian | Posht-e Rah | Posht-e Taqehai Chahar Bisheh | Potaki | Putu

=== Q ===
Qadamgah-e Emam Reza | Qajariyeh-ye Do | Qajariyeh-ye Yek | Qalam Ab | Qalandari | Qaland-e Olya | Qaland-e Sofla | Qaland-e Vosta | Qaleh Bardi | Qaleh Barun | Qaleh Chanan | Qaleh Dezh | Qaleh Hamud | Qaleh Kabi | Qaleh Lava | Qaleh Lut | Qaleh Madreseh | Qaleh Now Shamsabad | Qaleh Rak | Qaleh Razeh | Qaleh Sangar | Qaleh Sard-e Bala | Qaleh Sefid-e Olya | Qaleh Shah-e Pirabad | Qaleh Sharhan | Qaleh Sorkheh | Qaleh Tall | Qaleh Tarfi | Qaleh Timi | Qalehcheh-ye Muzarm | Qaleh-ye Abd ol Hoseyn | Qaleh-ye Changai | Qaleh-ye Dez Do | Qaleh-ye Gareh | Qaleh-ye Ghadir | Qaleh-ye Hajj Mohammad Hoseyn | Qaleh-ye Hajji Mazid | Qaleh-ye Harateh | Qaleh-ye Kazhdamak | Qaleh-ye Khalil | Qaleh-ye Khan | Qaleh-ye Khvajeh | Qaleh-ye Madreseh | Qaleh-ye Mazban | Qaleh-ye Meydan | Qaleh-ye Nasir | Qaleh-ye Puladi | Qaleh-ye Qazi | Qaleh-ye Sahar | Qaleh-ye Salvati | Qaleh-ye Sardar | Qaleh-ye Seyyed | Qaleh-ye Seyyed | Qaleh-ye Seyyed | Qaleh-ye Sheykh Jasem | Qaleh-ye Sheykh | Qaleh-ye Taqi | Qaleh-ye Tileh Kuh | Qaleh-ye Tuq | Qaleh-ye Zaras | Qanbari | Qandi | Qarah Veysi | Qareh Khan-e Sofla | Qarieh Nasir | Qariyeh-ye Shavardi | Qaryeh-ye Teymur | Qasem Alvan | Qasem Motsar | Qasem Zamel | Qasemabad | Qasemabad | Qaserdalu | Qatrani-ye Olya Yek | Qatrani-ye Sofla Yek | Qaziabad | Qaziabad | Qebleh Ei Do | Qerqereh-ye Malaki | Qeysariyeh-ye Olya | Qeysariyeh-ye Sofla | Qeysariyeh-ye Vosta | Qodratabad | Qofas | Qol Rumzi | Qosbeh-ye Maniat

=== R ===
Raddadeh | Radeh-ye Madan | Radeh-ye Sadat | Radeh-ye Seyhan | Radeh-ye Taha | Rafi | Rafi | Rafiabad | Ragbeh | Ragbi | Rag-e Halil | Rageh Kan | Raghiveh | Raghiveh | Rahdar | Rahdar-e Olya | Rahdar-e Sofla | Rahimabad | Rahmaniyeh | Rahmaniyeh-ye Feysali | Rahmaniyeh-ye Kabi | Rahmaniyeh-ye Zabun | Rakat-e Olya | Rakat-e Sofla | Rakeh | Ramhormoz | Ramileh | Ramim-e Shomali | Ramiyeh | Ramleh-ye Olya | Ramleh-ye Sofla | Ramsan | Ramseh-ye Do | Ramseh-ye Yek | Ramshir | Ramziyeh | Ramziyeh-e Yek | Ramziyeh-ye Do | Rang Rezi | Ranjaki | Ras-e Jonubi | Ras-e Sharqi | Rasfand | Rashg-e Shavur | Rashid | Razi | Razvandun | Reg Sefid | Repi | Rey Golal | Reyhaneh | Rez Gah | Rezaabad | Rezachal Kenar | Rezagahi | Rezvan | Rizlan | Robat-e Olya | Robat-e Sofla | Robeykheh | Romeyleh-ye Olya | Romeyleh-ye Sofla | Rostamabad | Rostamabad | Rostamiyeh | Roveys Tameh | Rud Zard-e Kayed Rafi | Rud Zard-e Mashin | Rudani | Rudzir | Rumiat | Rumis | Rustai Sahab Vazamel | Ruyzat-e Sofla | Ruzaneh | Ruzrak

=== S ===
Saadatabad | Sabbahi | Sabbahiyeh | Sab-e Agotay-e Olya | Sab-e Agotay-e Sofla | Sabeh | Sabeh-ye Do | Sabz Ab | Sabzabad | Sabzabad-e Olya | Sabzabad-e Sofla | Sabzi | Sabzi | Sabzi | Sabzlikeh Savarali | Sachat | Sachgan-e Olya | Sadat | Sadat-e Mohammad Ebrahim | Sadat-e Nejat Bozorg | Sadat-e Nejatollah | Sadd-e Karun Chahar | Sadd-e Kheyrabad | Sadd-e Shavur | Sadeq | Sadeqabad-e Sagbu | Sadeyreh-ye Olya | Sadeyreh-ye Sofla | Sadi | Sadreh-ye Seyyed Yaqub | Sadreh-ye Soveylat | Sadun Sheykh Mohammad | Sadun-e Do | Sadun-e Yek | Safai | Safar | Safheh | Safheh | Safheh-ye Do | Safi Khun | Safi Khuni | Safiabad | Safra | Safra-ye Moqaddam | Sag Kash Durak | Sagowr-e Farrih Mohammad | Sagowr-e Hanzaleh | Sahak-e Abd ol Nabi | Sahak-e Yareyeh | Sahinat | Said Salamat | Said | Said | Saidiyeh | Sajjadiyeh | Sakhi | Sakineh-ye Do | Sakran | Salahi | Salameh-ye Sofla | Salameh-ye Vosta | Salamgah | Salami | Salami | Saland | Salarabad | Saleh Davud | Saleh Ebrahim | Saleh Kutah | Saleh Mashhud | Saleh Moshatat | Saleh Said | Saleh Zobeyri | Salehak | Salemiyeh | Salhaviyeh | Saliyeh | Salman Bandar | Salman Davud | Salmaneh | Salmaniyeh | Samadiyeh | San Karim | Sanad Rashed | Sandal | Sandali-ye Gav Mishi | Sandali-ye Kanan | Sandaran | Sangar-e Chanibeh-ye Do | Sangar-e Chanibeh-ye Do | Sanjar | Sar Ab | Sar Anbar | Sar Bard Lakla | Sar Bazar | Sar Bisheh | Sar Chah-e Duruznab | Sar Cheshmeh-ye Olya | Sar Cheshmeh-ye Sofla | Sar Dahi | Sar Darreh | Sar Dasht | Sar Dul Nesarvand | Sar Durab | Sar Eshgaft-e Daraki | Sar Eshkaft | Sar Eshkoft | Sar Gach | Sar Gach | Sar Howz-e Bala | Sar Howz-e Pain | Sar Huni | Sar Jowshar-e Ahhad | Sar Jowshar-e Edalat | Sar Julaki | Sar Kahaki | Sar Kandeh-ye Pain | Sar Khar | Sar Khareh-ye Olya | Sar Khareh-ye Sofla | Sar Masjed | Sar Murd | Sar Murd-e Isi | Sar Murdkal | Sar Pushideh | Sar Pushideh | Sar Qaleh Palmi | Sar Qaleh Zivar | Sar Qaleh | Sar Qaleh-ye Ha | Sar Qaleh-ye Khalijan | Sar Sahra | Sar Sardab-e Olya | Sar Sardab-e Sofla | Sar Seyl-e Zardab-e Mohammad Taher | Sar Taf | Sar Tali | Sar Tang | Sar Tang | Sar Tang | Sar Tang | Sar Tang | Sar Tang-e Gadarkhani | Sar Tang-e Soleyman Koshteh | Sar Teyuk-e Olya | Sar Tuf | Sar Turehha | Sar Ziarat | Sarab-e Nargesi | Sarahuni Seyyed Mohammad Qoli | Saraimeh | Saraj ol Din | Sarakhiyeh | Sarallah | Sarand | Sarasiyab | Sarband-e Deh Di | Sarband-e Pain | Sarbi | Sarchenar | Sarcheshmeh-ye Talkhab | Sarchul | Sarchul | Sard | Sardarabad | Sardarabad | Sardasht | Sarhadd Aqa | Sarhani | Sarhaniyeh-ye Sofla | Sarhud Khoda Rahim | Sarimeh | Sariyeh | Sarkan-e Olya | Sarkan-e Sofla | Sarkot-e Sheyni | Sarkul | Sarkuli | Sarmach | Sarmur | Sarnamak-e Darkul | Sarnistan | Saroleh | Sarpar Abejdan | Sarrag | Sarrag-e Khvajaveh | Sarrak-e Olya | Sarrak-e Sofla | Sartang-e Faleh | Sartang-e Galal Sharb | Sartang-e Shab Kuri | Sarteliha | Sartol | Sarzandan | Savadeh | Savali | Savamar | Savarabad | Savareh | Savimeh | Sayyar Ahmadabad | Sayyar Ahmadabad-e Movali | Sayyed Majid | Sayyed Yaber | Sedin-e Do | Sedin-e Yek | Sedreh | Seffak | Sefiddara | Segareh | Seh Bardan | Seh Boneh | Seh Boneh-ye Olya | Seh Eshgaftan | Seh Eshgaftan Sabzi | Seh Konar | Seh Konarvan | Seh Lor | Seh Tolun | Selas-e Olya | Seleh Chin-e Olya | Seleh Chin-e Sofla | Seliran-e Olya | Seliran-e Sofla | Sen | Senijeh | Seresht | Seri Yek-e Zarruk | Setamiyeh-ye Bozorg | Setamiyeh-ye Kuchek | Seyd Aviyeh | Seydun | Seyfabad | Seyl Klang | Seyreh | Seyyed Abbas | Seyyed Abdollah | Seyyed Adnan | Seyyed Ali Mohammad | Seyyed Amer | Seyyed Baqer | Seyyed Dakhil | Seyyed Davud | Seyyed Fazel | Seyyed Gatush | Seyyed Ghazeban Fazeli | Seyyed Hamadi | Seyyed Hamid | Seyyed Hasan | Seyyed Hasan | Seyyed Hasan-e Hakim | Seyyed Hoseyn Musavi | Seyyed Jasem | Seyyed Karim | Seyyed Khalaf | Seyyed Khalaf | Seyyed Khashan | Seyyed Maan | Seyyed Morad | Seyyed Nabi | Seyyed Naser | Seyyed Nasir ol Din Mohammad | Seyyed Nazar | Seyyed Nur | Seyyed Rahimeh | Seyyed Rajab | Seyyed Ramazan | Seyyed Razi | Seyyed Saleh | Seyyed Salman | Seyyed Sharif | Seyyed Sharif | Seyyed Sobhan | Seyyed Taher | Seyyed Taher Fazeli | Seyyed Yaddam | Seyyed Yusef | Seyyed Zahrav | Seyyedan | Seyyediyeh | Sezar | Shabili | Shadegan | Shah Abu ol Qasem | Shah Nabi-ye Olya | Shah Nazari | Shah Neshin | Shah Rahzan | Shah Vali | Shah Vali | Shahabad-e Sadat | Shahbazan | Shah-e Pirabad | Shahid-e Lefatah Kashtiban | Shahin | Shahr Kohneh | Shahrak-e Ab Zalu | Shahrak-e Alam ol Hoda | Shahrak-e Amir ol Momenin | Shahrak-e Ansar | Shahrak-e Ashayri Hazart Mehdi | Shahrak-e Askan Ashayir | Shahrak-e Askan Ashayr | Shahrak-e Ayatollah Madani | Shahrak-e Ayatollah Motahhari | Shahrak-e Azadi | Shahrak-e Azadi | Shahrak-e Azadi | Shahrak-e Babak | Shahrak-e Bahram | Shahrak-e Balal | Shahrak-e Bardbaran | Shahrak-e Behruzi | Shahrak-e Benat ol Hoda | Shahrak-e Danial-e Shush | Shahrak-e Danshegah Valiasr | Shahrak-e Do Kuheh | Shahrak-e Edalat | Shahrak-e Emam Hoseyn | Shahrak-e Emam Reza | Shahrak-e Enqelab | Shahrak-e Eslamabad | Shahrak-e Fajr | Shahrak-e Hamzeh | Shahrak-e Hamzeh | Shahrak-e Horr | Shahrak-e Kheybar | Shahrak-e Kordestan | Shahrak-e Kowsar | Shahrak-e Malek-e Ashtar | Shahrak-e Mamku | Shahrak-e Mavi | Shahrak-e Meysam | Shahrak-e Mohajeran | Shahrak-e Mohammad Ebn-e Jafar | Shahrak-e Mohammad Reza Asadpur | Shahrak-e Mojahedin | Shahrak-e Mokhtar | Shahrak-e Montazeri | Shahrak-e Motahhari | Shahrak-e Nur Mohammadi | Shahrak-e Panjam | Shahrak-e Piruzi | Shahrak-e Qaleh Mokhtar | Shahrak-e Qods | Shahrak-e Qods | Shahrak-e Salman-e Farsi | Shahrak-e Seyyed Enayat | Shahrak-e Shahid Ali Chaab | Shahrak-e Shahid Bahonar | Shahrak-e Shahid Beheshti | Shahrak-e Shahid Beheshti | Shahrak-e Shahid Chamran | Shahrak-e Shahid Falahi | Shahrak-e Shahid Karimi | Shahrak-e Shahid Madani | Shahrak-e Shahid Mohammad Montazeri | Shahrak-e Shahid Mohasan Boni Najar | Shahrak-e Shahid Rajai | Shahrak-e Shahid Sharaft | Shahrak-e Shahidar Jai | Shahrak-e Shamsabad | Shahrak-e Shoeyb Nabi | Shahrak-e Taleqani | Shahrak-e Taleqani | Shahrak-e Taleqani | Shahrak-e Taleqani | Shahrak-e Taleqani | Shahrak-e Towhid | Shahrak-e Vahdat | Shahrak-e Vali-ye Asr | Shahrak-e Yaser | Shahrui | Shahu-ye Garatin | Shahzadeh Abdollah | Shahzadeh Ahmad | Shajarat | Shajirat | Shakariat | Shakeriyeh | Shakh Kupal | Shakheh-ye Albu Shahbaz | Shakheh-ye Ghanem | Shakheh-ye Jadid | Shakheh-ye Mobaderi | Shakheh-ye Sofla | Shakhiter | Shakhtal Khan | Shakhtal Khan-e Do | Shakhtal Khan-e Seh | Shakraleh | Shalheh | Shalheh | Shalheh-ye Emam Hasan | Shalheh-ye Fazeli | Shalheh-ye Hajji Hoseyn | Shaligham | Shalili-ye Bozorg | Shalili-ye Kuchek | Shalivet | Shamariyeh | Shamlan | Shammeh | Shamsabad | Shamsabad | Shamsabad | Sharafabad-e Mastufi | Shardin | Shareh | Shari Mari | Shariati-ye Yek | Sharieh-ye Omm-e Teman | Sharieh-ye Seyyed Abud | Sharif | Sharifabad | Sharifabad | Sharifiyeh | Shartaq-e Do | Shartaq-e Yek | Sharu | Sharukhiyeh | Shati | Shavar | Shaveh-ye Beyt Hamid | Shaveh-ye Beyt Mansur | Shaverdi | Shavi | Shavi | Shebat-e Tuleh | Shekar Ab | Shekar Ab | Shenaneh-ye Do | Sheneh | Sheyban | Sheybani | Sheykh Ahmad | Sheykh Ali Asghar | Sheykh Ali | Sheykh Faleh | Sheykh Fandi | Sheykh Fares | Sheykh Fozeyl | Sheykh Ghayib | Sheykh Hanush | Sheykh Hasan | Sheykh Hatam | Sheykh Hoseyn | Sheykh Isa | Sheykh Jasem | Sheykh Kheyri | Sheykh Khomat | Sheykh Madi | Sheykh Mohammad | Sheykh Nader | Sheykh Rahman | Sheykh Saleh | Sheykh Saleh | Sheykh Shams ol Din | Sheykh Taleb | Sheykh Tomeh | Sheykh Zaharav | Sheykh Zeydan | Sheykh Zoveyr | Sheykhi | Shibiyeh | Shifeh | Shiman | Shiman-e Zir Ab | Shir Ali | Shir Ali | Shir Ali | Shiri | Shirin Ab | Shirin Ab | Shirin Ab | Shirin Ab | Shirin Ab | Shirzad | Shoaymat-e Do | Shoaymat-e Seh | Shoaymat-e Yek | Shoaymit-e Jaber | Shoaymit-e Mandil | Shobeliyeh | Shobeysheh | Shobeysheh | Shobeyshi-ye Bozorg | Shobeyshi-ye Kuchak | Shoeyteh | Shoheytat | Shokareh | Sholeh-ye Zardu | Sholeh-ye Zarik | Shomilan | Shongor-e Olya | Shoqarij-e Olya | Shoqarij-e Sofla | Shuhan-e Olya | Shuhan-e Sofla | Shukol | Shukol-e Sahan Ali | Shun Bacheh | Shur Barik | Shur Tang | Shush | Shushtar | Shushtari | Si Mayeli-ye Gardbisheh | Siah Gel | Siah Mansur | Sib | Sikvand | Silabak | Sobakhiyeh | Sobhaniyeh | Sofeyreh | Soleyman | Soltanabad | Soltanabad | Somaleh | Someydeh | Someydeh | Somumiyeh | Sorkh Kan | Sorkheh-ye Do | Sorkheh-ye Yek | Soveychti-ye Do | Soveychti-ye Seh | Soveydani | Soveyheti-ye Yek | Soveyreh | Soveyseh-ye Sadat | Soveyseh-ye Saleh | Soveyseh-ye Seh | Sowdeh-ye Olya | Sowdeh-ye Sofla | Sowreh | Sudan | Sufan-e Olya | Sufan-e Sofla | Sufiyah | Sukhteh | Sulak | Sur-e Meqdad | Suri | Susanbal | Susangerd | Suzpabedeh

=== T ===
Tabati | Tabreh-ye Olya | Tachel Ali Shir | Tafaki Anarki | Tagtageh | Taherabad | Taherabad | Taheriyeh-ye Do | Taheriyeh-ye Yek | Tahlvazard | Tahtavil | Tak Taku | Takab Bandan | Takaidi | Takap | Tak-e Sofla | Takht Arreh Do | Takht Arreh Yek | Takht-e Ali Zali | Takht-e Giveh Deran | Takht-e Kabud | Takht-e Kabud Nargesi | Takht-e Malek | Takht-e Meshkun | Takht-e Qeysar | Takht-e Sabz | Takht-e Sar Ab | Takht-e Tuk | Takhtiyeh | Takhtshah-e Pain | Takutar | Takyeh | Tal Hajj Ali | Tala | Talageh-ye Sofla | Talambrun Ali Shir | Talavar-e Do | Talavar-e Seh | Talavar-e Yek | Talebabad | Taleb-e Asfur | Talil | Talkh Ab-e Zardpatak | Talkhab | Talkhab | Talkhab-e Ahmadi | Talkhab-e Hamzeh Ali | Talkhab-e Khun Ali | Talkhab-e Nazer | Talkhab-e Taj od Din | Tall Asvad | Tall Baman | Tall Barmi | Tall Bumeh | Tall Chegah-e Olya | Tall Chegah-e Sofla | Tall Gavineh | Tall Gesar | Tall Kohneh | Tall Shur | Tall-e Asvad | Tall-e Bardi | Tall-e Gorosneh | Tall-e Quchan | Tall-e Shirazi | Tall-e Siasat | Tall-e Zarrini | Talleh Zang | Talleh Zargeh | Talleh-ye Bala | Talpa | Talteliyeh | Taluk | Tampureh-ye Ruisheyd | Tanag Lai | Tanbaku Kar | Tanbaku Kar-e Ali | Tanbaku Kar-e Ebrahim | Tanbaku Kar-e Pain | Tanbakukar | Taneh Berri | Tang Ab | Tang Andari | Tang Deh-ye Shalal | Tang Dez-e Olya | Tang Dez-e Sofla | Tang Gonda | Tang Julan | Tang Kord | Tang Shah | Tang Talkh-e Do | Tang Talkh-e Pagin | Tang Talkh-e Shomilan | Tang Talkh-e Yek | Tang-e Ban | Tang-e Halil | Tang-e Jafar | Tang-e Khoshk | Tang-e Palangi | Tang-e Palangi | Tang-e Pol | Tang-e Qaf | Tang-e Rashid | Tang-e Sanan | Tang-e Sheykh | Tang-e Tahak | Tang-e Vard | Tang-e Zirgol Bardar | Tangeh-ye Do | Tangeh-ye Seh | Tangeh-ye Yek | Tanur-e Boland | Tapuli | Taq Hoseyn-e Seyd Hadi | Taqa | Taqab | Taqahai-ye Chahar Bisheh | Taqakenarsheh | Taqha-ye Jafar Qoli | Taqiabad | Tarakab | Tarakab | Taraz | Tarfayeh | Tarrah-e Do | Tarrah-e Yek | Tarreh Bakhakh Pardis | Tarreh-e Khezr | Tarvih Adai | Tasfiyeh Shekar | Tasyesat-e Kut-e Amir | Tatar | Tavaher | Tavarshah | Tavibeh | Tavil | Tavileh-ye Do | Tavileh-ye Yek | Tekheyt-e Olya | Tekheyt-e Sofla | Telinkuh | Tembi Gelgir | Tembi | Tighen-e Olya | Tighen-e Sofla | Tileh Kuh | Tileh Molla | Tina | Tit Gom | Toghli Alabad | Toghli Albu Fatileh | Toghli Sadat | Tok Tokab | Tom Bahar | Tombal | Torkalaki | Torshak | Toveybeh-ye Sheykh Hatam | Toveyleh-ye Bozorg | Toveyleh-ye Kuchek | Toveyleh-ye Seyyed Taher | Toveyleh-ye Yebareh | Tovjiyeh-ye Bala | Tudu | Tuf Zari Chavil | Tuh Medad | Tumarz | Turahi | Turak | Tut-e Olya | Tut-e Sofla | Tuveh

=== U ===
Ud-e Taqi | Udeh-ye Sofla | Ufi

=== V ===
Vahdat | Vahhabiyeh | Vahid | Vali Kuchekeh | Vali | Valiabad | Valiabad | Valiabad | Valiyeh | Vareh-ye Mohammad Jafari | Vargeh Sabztazeh | Varkuh | Varzard-e Olya | Varzard-e Sofla | Vasileh Yek | Vazi | Venai | Veys | Veysi | Veysi | Vostaniyeh-ye Do | Vostaniyeh-ye Yek

=== Y ===
Yabareh | Yadi | Yahmureh-ye Do | Yahmureh-ye Seh | Yahmureh-ye Yek | Yaribieh | Yasar | Yasarat | Yashansakhi | Yazab | Yazd-e Now | Ye Gavi | Yegavi | Yek Borji | Yekaviyeh-ye Do | Yekaviyeh-ye Seh | Yekaviyeh-ye Yek | Yerisiyeh | Yitiman | Yoar | Yobareh | Yoheysheh | Yubeh | Yukhan | Yusefi

=== Z ===
Zabari-ye Do | Zabari-ye Yek | Zabeh | Zabut | Zahiri | Zahra va Mehdi | Zahreh | Zakhireh-ye Esmail Ghanom | Zalqi | Zamanabad | Zanat | Zangard | Zangel Ab-e Deli | Zaraqoli-ye Bala | Zaraqoli-ye Pain | Zargan-e Karaneh | Zarrestan | Zarzuri | Zavareh-ye Saland Kuh | Zavidat | Zaviyeh Hajjian | Zaviyeh Hamudi | Zaviyeh Khersan | Zaviyeh Mashali | Zaviyeh Moradi | Zehiriyeh | Zehiriyeh-ye Bala | Zeydan | Zeyl | Zeylab Hasan Jan | Zeyn ol Abedin | Zeyrcheshmeh-ye Ab Anari | Zeytunabad | Zibashahr | Zila-ye Aliasgar | Zir Rah | Zir-e Murd | Zir-e Zard | Zir-e Zard | Zirrah | Zirtuf Ali Akbar | Ziyah | Zobeyd va Dabbat | Zobeydeh | Zobeydeh-ye Ariyez | Zohuabad | Zolfaqar | Zolmabad | Zoveydi-ye Maghamez | Zoveydi-ye Musa | Zoveydi-ye Ramezan | Zoveyneh | Zoveyr-e Chari | Zoveyr-e Kharamzeh | Zoviyeh-ye Do | Zoviyeh-ye Do | Zoviyeh-ye Yek-e Olya | Zoviyeh-ye Yek-e Olya | Zoviyeh-ye Yek-e Sofla | Zoviyeh-ye Yek-e Sofla | Zowab | Zowalfali | Zulaher
