= Lovai =

Lavaie لوائی
- Village
- Location within Iran
- Coordinates: 31°48′03″N 49°54′46″E
- Country: Iran
- Province: Khuzestan
- County: Izeh
- Bakhsh: Central
- Rural District: Howmeh-ye Sharqi

Population (2006)
  - Total: 268
- Time zone: UTC+3:30 (IRST)
  - Summer (DST): UTC+4:30 (IRDT)

Lavaei (Persian: لوائی, also Romanized as Lavā’ī) is a village in Howmeh-ye Sharqi Rural District, in the Central District of Izeh County, Khuzestan Province, Iran. At the 2006 census, its population was 268, in 47 families.
