= Piranshahr, Kordestan =

Piranshahr پيرانشهر
- village
- Location within Iran
- Coordinates: 32°00′36″N 49°48′50″E
- Country: Iran
- Province: Khuzestan
- County: Izeh
- Bakhsh: Susan
- Rural district: Susan-e Gharbi

Population (2006)
  - Total: 220
- Time zone: UTC+03:30 (IRST)
  - Summer (DST): UTC+04:30 (IRDT)

Piranshahr (Persian: پيرانشهر, also Romanized as Pīrānshāhr; also known as Pīran Shāhr) is a village in Susan-e Gharbi Rural District, Susan District, Izeh County, Khuzestan province, Iran. At the 2006 census, its population was 220, in 42 families.
