= Belgarus =

Belgarus بل گروس
- Village
- Location within Iran
- Coordinates: 31°57′23″N 49°36′09″E
- Country: Iran
- Province: Khuzestan
- County: Izeh
- Bakhsh: Central
- Rural District: Margha

Population (2006)
  - Total: 252
- Time zone: UTC+3:30 (IRST)
  - Summer (DST): UTC+4:30 (IRDT)

Belgarus (Persian: بل گروس, also Romanized as Belgarūs; also known as Belgares, Bolgores, and Bolgoros) is a village in Margha Rural District, in the Central District of Izeh County, Khuzestan Province, Iran. At the 2006 census, its population was 252, in 42 families.
