= Gordlidan =

Gordlidan گردليدان
- Village
- Location within Iran
- Coordinates: 31°35′11″N 50°19′08″E
- Country: Iran
- Province: Khuzestan
- County: Izeh
- Bakhsh: Dehdez
- Rural District: Donbaleh Rud-e Jonubi

Population (2006)
  - Total: 122
- Time zone: UTC+3:30 (IRST)
  - Summer (DST): UTC+4:30 (IRDT)

Gordlidan (Persian: گردليدان, also Romanized as Gordlīdān and Gerd Līdān; also known as Bord Līdān) is a village in Donbaleh Rud-e Jonubi Rural District, Dehdez District, Izeh County, Khuzestan Province, Iran. At the 2006 census, its population was 122, in 19 families.
