= Kal Khvajeh-ye Sofla =

Kal Khvajeh-ye Sofla كل خواجه سفلي
- Village
- Location within Iran
- Coordinates: 31°42′28″N 50°11′19″E
- Country: Iran
- Province: Khuzestan
- County: Izeh
- Bakhsh: Dehdez
- Rural District: Dehdez

Population (2006)
  - Total: 200
- Time zone: UTC+3:30 (IRST)
  - Summer (DST): UTC+4:30 (IRDT)

Kal Khvajeh-ye Sofla (Persian: كل خواجه سفلي, also Romanized as Kal Khvājeh-ye Soflá; also known as Kal Khvājeh) is a village in Dehdez Rural District, Dehdez District, Izeh County, Khuzestan Province, Iran. At the 2006 census, its population was 200, in 32 families.
