= Lirsiah-e Shapuri =

Lirsiah-e Shapuri ليرسياه شاپوري
- Village
- Location within Iran
- Coordinates: 31°36′10″N 50°18′13″E
- Country: Iran
- Province: Khuzestan
- County: Izeh
- Bakhsh: Dehdez
- Rural District: Donbaleh Rud-e Jonubi

Population (2006)
  - Total: 255
- Time zone: UTC+3:30 (IRST)
  - Summer (DST): UTC+4:30 (IRDT)

Lirsiah-e Shapuri (Persian: ليرسياه شاپوري, also Romanized as Līrsīāh-e Shāpūrī) is a village in Donbaleh Rud-e Jonubi Rural District, Dehdez District, Izeh County, Khuzestan Province, Iran. At the 2006 census, its population was 255, in 35 families.
