= Bardboran =

Bardboran بردبران
- Village
- Location within Iran
- Coordinates: 31°47′36″N 49°55′24″E
- Country: Iran
- Province: Khuzestan
- County: Izeh
- Bakhsh: Central
- Rural District: Howmeh-ye Sharqi

Population (2006)
  - Total: 502
- Time zone: UTC+3:30 (IRST)
  - Summer (DST): UTC+4:30 (IRDT)

Bardboran (Persian: بردبران, also Romanized as Bardborān; also known as Bard Borān-e Bandān) is a village in Howmeh-ye Sharqi Rural District, in the Central District of Izeh County, Khuzestan Province, Iran. At the 2006 census, its population was 502, in 90 families.
