= Jughband =

Jughband جوغ بند
- Village
- Location within Iran
- Coordinates: 31°42′01″N 49°46′51″E
- Country: Iran
- Province: Khuzestan
- County: Izeh
- Bakhsh: Central
- Rural District: Holayjan

Population (2006)
  - Total: 151
- Time zone: UTC+3:30 (IRST)
  - Summer (DST): UTC+4:30 (IRDT)

Jughband (Persian: جوغ بند, also Romanized as Jūghband; also known as Jūghban) is a village in Holayjan Rural District, in the Central District of Izeh County, Khuzestan Province, Iran. At the 2006 census, its population was 151, in 23 families.
