= Darreh Gharib =

Darreh Gharib دره غريب
- Village
- Location within Iran
- Coordinates: 31°39′12″N 50°12′44″E
- Country: Iran
- Province: Khuzestan
- County: Izeh
- Bakhsh: Dehdez
- Rural District: Dehdez

Population (2006)
  - Total: 167
- Time zone: UTC+3:30 (IRST)
  - Summer (DST): UTC+4:30 (IRDT)

Darreh Gharib (Persian: دره غريب, also Romanized as Darreh Gharīb) is a village in Dehdez Rural District, Dehdez District, Izeh County, Khuzestan Province, Iran. At the 2006 census, its population was 167, in 29 families.
