= Lishasi =

Lishasi ليشاسي
- Village
- Location within Iran
- Coordinates: 31°38′53″N 50°17′32″E
- Country: Iran
- Province: Khuzestan
- County: Izeh
- Bakhsh: Dehdez
- Rural District: Dehdez

Population (2006)
  - Total: 82
- Time zone: UTC+3:30 (IRST)
  - Summer (DST): UTC+4:30 (IRDT)

Lishasi (Persian: ليشاسي, also Romanized as Līshāsī) is a village in Dehdez Rural District, Dehdez District, Izeh County, Khuzestan Province, Iran. At the 2006 census, its population was 82, in 17 families.
