= Pol-e Abdugh =

Pol-e Abdugh پل ابدوغ
- Village
- Location within Iran
- Coordinates: 31°53′51″N 50°01′39″E
- Country: Iran
- Province: Khuzestan
- County: Izeh
- Bakhsh: Central
- Rural District: Howmeh-ye Sharqi

Population (2006)
  - Total: 238
- Time zone: UTC+3:30 (IRST)
  - Summer (DST): UTC+4:30 (IRDT)

Pol-e Abdugh (Persian: پل ابدوغ, also Romanized as Pol-e Ābdūgh and Pol Ābdūgh) is a village in Howmeh-ye Sharqi Rural District, in the Central District of Izeh County, Khuzestan Province, Iran. At the 2006 census, its population was 238, in 42 families.
