= Tang Andari =

Tang Andari تنگ اندري
- Village
- Location within Iran
- Coordinates: 31°47′39″N 49°46′23″E
- Country: Iran
- Province: Khuzestan
- County: Izeh
- Bakhsh: Central
- Rural District: Holayjan

Population (2006)
  - Total: 70
- Time zone: UTC+3:30 (IRST)
  - Summer (DST): UTC+4:30 (IRDT)

Tang Andari (Persian: تنگ اندري, also Romanized as Tang Andarī) is a village in Holayjan Rural District, in the Central District of Izeh County, Khuzestan Province, Iran. At the 2006 census, its population was 70, in 12 families.
