= Faleh-e Sarqaleh =

Faleh-e Sarqaleh فالح سرقلعه
- Village
- Location within Iran
- Coordinates: 31°56′48″N 50°02′52″E
- Country: Iran
- Province: Khuzestan
- County: Izeh
- Bakhsh: Susan
- Rural District: Susan-e Sharqi

Population (2006)
  - Total: 121
- Time zone: UTC+3:30 (IRST)
  - Summer (DST): UTC+4:30 (IRDT)

Faleh-e Sarqaleh (Persian: فالح سرقلعه, also Romanized as Fāleḩ-e Sarqal‘eh) is a village in Susan-e Sharqi Rural District, Susan District, Izeh County, Khuzestan Province, Iran. At the 2006 census, its population was 121, in 25 families.
