= Chehel Tanan =

Chehel Tanan چهل تنان
- Village
- Location within Iran
- Coordinates: 31°46′30″N 50°16′48″E
- Country: Iran
- Province: Khuzestan
- County: Izeh
- Bakhsh: Dehdez
- Rural District: Dehdez

Population (2006)
  - Total: 66
- Time zone: UTC+3:30 (IRST)
  - Summer (DST): UTC+4:30 (IRDT)
- Website: cheltanan.blogfa.com

Chehel Tanan (Persian: چهل تنان, also Romanized as Chehel Tanān) is a village in Dehdez Rural District, Dehdez District, Izeh County, Khuzestan province, Iran. At the 2006 census, its population was 66, in 15 families.
