= Mulali =

Mulali موللي
- Village
- Location within Iran
- Coordinates: 31°56′46″N 50°02′12″E
- Country: Iran
- Province: Khuzestan
- County: Izeh
- Bakhsh: Susan
- Rural District: Susan-e Sharqi

Population (2006)
  - Total: 43
- Time zone: UTC+3:30 (IRST)
  - Summer (DST): UTC+4:30 (IRDT)

Mulali (Persian: موللي, also Romanized as Mūlalī; also known as Mowlūlī) is a village in Susan-e Sharqi Rural District, Susan District, Izeh County, Khuzestan Province, Iran. At the 2006 census, its population was 43, in 8 families.
