= Kal-e Babadi =

Kal-e Babadi كل بابادی
- Village
- Location within Iran
- Coordinates: 31°40′16″N 50°19′15″E
- Country: Iran
- Province: Khuzestan
- County: Izeh
- Bakhsh: Dehdez
- Rural District: Dehdez

Population (2006)
  - Total: 56
- Time zone: UTC+3:30 (IRST)
  - Summer (DST): UTC+4:30 (IRDT)

Kal-e Babadi (Persian: كل بابادی, also Romanized as Kal-e Bābādī) is a village in Dehdez Rural District, Dehdez District, Izeh County, Khuzestan Province, Iran. At the 2006 census, its population was 56, in 10 families.
