= Jahangerd =

Jahangerd جهانگرد
- Village
- Location within Iran
- Coordinates: 31°51′53″N 50°03′53″E
- Country: Iran
- Province: Khuzestan
- County: Izeh
- Bakhsh: Dehdez
- Rural District: Donbaleh Rud-e Shomali

Population (2006)
  - Total: 48
- Time zone: UTC+3:30 (IRST)
  - Summer (DST): UTC+4:30 (IRDT)

Jahangerd (Persian: جهانگرد, also Romanized as Jahāngerd; also known as Jahālgard) is a village in Donbaleh Rud-e Shomali Rural District, Dehdez District, Izeh County, Khuzestan Province, Iran. At the 2006 census, its population was 48, in 7 families.
