= Takht-e Sabz =

Takht-e Sabz تخت سبز
- Village
- Location within Iran
- Coordinates: 32°09′29″N 49°41′56″E
- Country: Iran
- Province: Khuzestan
- County: Izeh
- Bakhsh: Central
- Rural District: Pian

Population (2006)
  - Total: 120
- Time zone: UTC+3:30 (IRST)
  - Summer (DST): UTC+4:30 (IRDT)

Takht-e Sabz (Persian: تخت سبز; also known as Takht-e Sabz-e Vosţá and Takht-e Sar) is a village in Pian Rural District, in the Central District of Izeh County, Khuzestan Province, Iran. At the 2006 census, its population was 120, in 17 families.
