= Lirharan =

Lirharan ليرهاران
- Village
- Location within Iran
- Coordinates: 31°37′17″N 50°21′02″E
- Country: Iran
- Province: Khuzestan
- County: Izeh
- Bakhsh: Dehdez
- Rural District: Dehdez

Population (2006)
  - Total: 65
- Time zone: UTC+3:30 (IRST)
  - Summer (DST): UTC+4:30 (IRDT)

Lirharan (Persian: ليرهاران, also Romanized as Līrhārān; also known as Līrhārun) is a village in Dehdez Rural District, Dehdez District, Izeh County, Khuzestan Province, Iran. At the 2006 census, its population was 65, in 12 families.
