= Razvandun =

Razvandun رازوندون
- Village
- Location within Iran
- Coordinates: 31°53′01″N 50°02′03″E
- Country: Iran
- Province: Khuzestan
- County: Izeh
- Bakhsh: Central
- Rural District: Howmeh-ye Sharqi

Population (2006)
  - Total: 93
- Time zone: UTC+3:30 (IRST)
  - Summer (DST): UTC+4:30 (IRDT)

Razvandun (Persian: رازوندون, also Romanized as Rāzvandūn) is a village in Howmeh-ye Sharqi Rural District, in the Central District of Izeh County, Khuzestan Province, Iran. At the 2006 census, its population was 93, in 19 families.
