= Seh Eshgaftan =

Seh Eshgaftan سه اشگفتان
- Village
- Location within Iran
- Coordinates: 32°13′24″N 49°42′58″E
- Country: Iran
- Province: Khuzestan
- County: Izeh
- Bakhsh: Central
- Rural District: Pian

Population (2006)
  - Total: 43
- Time zone: UTC+3:30 (IRST)
  - Summer (DST): UTC+4:30 (IRDT)

Seh Eshgaftan (Persian: سه اشگفتان, also Romanized as Seh Eshgaftān; also known as Seh Eshkaftadān and Seh Eshkaftān) is a village in Pian Rural District, in the Central District of Izeh County, Khuzestan Province, Iran. At the 2006 census, its population was 43, in 7 families.
