= Kal Narges-e Karanj =

Kal Narges-e Karanj كل نرگس كارنج
- Village
- Location within Iran
- Coordinates: 31°55′14″N 50°01′01″E
- Country: Iran
- Province: Khuzestan
- County: Izeh
- Bakhsh: Central
- Rural District: Howmeh-ye Sharqi

Population (2006)
  - Total: 23
- Time zone: UTC+3:30 (IRST)
  - Summer (DST): UTC+4:30 (IRDT)

Kal Narges-e Karanj (Persian: كل نرگس كارنج, also Romanized as Kal Narges-e Kāranj and Kal Narges-e Kārenj) is a village in Howmeh-ye Sharqi Rural District, in the Central District of Izeh County, Khuzestan Province, Iran. At the 2006 census, its population was 23, in 4 families.
