= Kal Chenar =

Kal Chenar كل چنار
- Village
- Location within Iran
- Coordinates: 32°03′51″N 49°41′48″E
- Country: Iran
- Province: Khuzestan
- County: Izeh
- Bakhsh: Central
- Rural District: Pian

Population (2006)
  - Total: 593
- Time zone: UTC+3:30 (IRST)
  - Summer (DST): UTC+4:30 (IRDT)

Kal Chenar (Persian: كل چنار, also Romanized as Kal Chenār; also known as Kalchandār and Kaleh Chendār) is a village in Pian Rural District, in the Central District of Izeh County, Khuzestan Province, Iran. At the 2006 census, its population was 593, in 125 families.
