= Par Chunak =

Par Chunak پرچونك
- Village
- Location within Iran
- Coordinates: 31°33′00″N 50°19′00″E
- Country: Iran
- Province: Khuzestan
- County: Izeh
- Bakhsh: Dehdez
- Rural District: Donbaleh Rud-e Jonubi

Population (2006)
  - Total: 231
- Time zone: UTC+3:30 (IRST)
  - Summer (DST): UTC+4:30 (IRDT)

Par Chunak (Persian: پرچونك, also Romanized as Par Chūnak; also known as Par Chānak and Par Javanak) is a village in Donbaleh Rud-e Jonubi Rural District, Dehdez District, Izeh County, Khuzestan Province, Iran. At the 2006 census, its population was 231, in 45 families.
