= Mohammad Taqi, Khuzestan =

Coordinates: 31.9406°N 49.5001°E

Mohammad Taqi محمدتقي
- Village
- Interactive map of Mohammad Taqi
- Country: Iran
- Province: Khuzestan
- County: Izeh
- Bakhsh: Central
- Rural District: Pian

Population (2006)
  - Total: 60
- Time zone: UTC+3:30 (IRST)
  - Summer (DST): UTC+4:30 (IRDT)

Mohammad Taqi (Persian: محمدتقي, also Romanized as Moḩammad Taqī) is a village in Pian Rural District, in the Central District of Izeh County, Khuzestan Province, Iran. At the 2006 census, its population was 60, in 10 families.
