= Kul-e Jaz =

Kul-e Jaz كول جاز
- Village
- Location within Iran
- Coordinates: 31°49′43″N 49°58′50″E
- Country: Iran
- Province: Khuzestan
- County: Izeh
- Bakhsh: Central
- Rural District: Howmeh-ye Sharqi

Population (2006)
  - Total: 29
- Time zone: UTC+3:30 (IRST)
  - Summer (DST): UTC+4:30 (IRDT)

Kul-e Jaz (Persian: كول جاز, also Romanized as Kūl-e Jāz; also known as Kūleh Jāz) is a village in Howmeh-ye Sharqi Rural District, in the Central District of Izeh County, Khuzestan Province, Iran. At the 2006 census, its population was 29, in 4 families.
