= Alhak =

Alhak الهك
- Village
- Location within Iran
- Coordinates: 31°49′13″N 49°49′35″E
- Country: Iran
- Province: Khuzestan
- County: Izeh
- Bakhsh: Central
- Rural District: Howmeh-ye Gharbi

Population (2006)
  - Total: 112
- Time zone: UTC+3:30 (IRST)
  - Summer (DST): UTC+4:30 (IRDT)

Alhak (Persian: الهك, also Romanized as Elhak) is a village in Howmeh-ye Gharbi Rural District, in the Central District of Izeh County, Khuzestan Province, Iran. At the 2006 census, its population was 112, in 19 families.
