= Nal-e Kanan =

Nal-e Kanan نعل‌کنان
- Village
- Location within Iran
- Coordinates: 31°44′34″N 50°10′46″E
- Country: Iran
- Province: Khuzestan
- County: Izeh
- Bakhsh: Dehdez
- Rural District: Donbaleh Rud-e Shomali

Population (2006)
  - Total: 236
- Time zone: UTC+3:30 (IRST)
  - Summer (DST): UTC+4:30 (IRDT)

Nal-e Kanan (Persian: نعل‌کنان, also Romanized as Na‘l-e Kanān) is a village in Donbaleh Rud-e Shomali Rural District, Dehdez District, Izeh County, Khuzestan Province, Iran. At the 2006 census, its population was 236, in 49 families.
