= Kal-e Boland =

Kal-e Boland كل بلند
- Village
- Location within Iran
- Coordinates: 31°40′12″N 50°19′43″E
- Country: Iran
- Province: Khuzestan
- County: Izeh
- Bakhsh: Dehdez
- Rural District: Dehdez

Population (2006)
  - Total: 64
- Time zone: UTC+3:30 (IRST)
  - Summer (DST): UTC+4:30 (IRDT)

Kal-e Boland (Persian: كل بلند, also romanized as Kal Boland and Kol Boland) is a village in Dehdez Rural District, Dehdez District, Izeh County, Khuzestan Province, Iran. At the 2006 census, its population was 64, in 12 families.
