= Beneshti =

Beneshti بنشتي
- Village
- Location within Iran
- Coordinates: 31°59′00″N 49°59′00″E
- Country: Iran
- Province: Khuzestan
- County: Izeh
- Bakhsh: Susan
- Rural District: Susan-e Sharqi

Population (2006)
  - Total: 44
- Time zone: UTC+3:30 (IRST)
  - Summer (DST): UTC+4:30 (IRDT)

Beneshti (Persian: بنشتي, also Romanized as Beneshtī) is a village in Susan-e Sharqi Rural District, Susan District, Izeh County, Khuzestan Province, Iran. At the 2006 census, its population was 44, in 14 families.
