= Peneti =

Peneti پنتي
- Village
- Location within Iran
- Coordinates: 31°58′27″N 49°42′39″E
- Country: Iran
- Province: Khuzestan
- County: Izeh
- Bakhsh: Central
- Rural District: Pian

Population (2006)
  - Total: 136
- Time zone: UTC+3:30 (IRST)
  - Summer (DST): UTC+4:30 (IRDT)

Peneti (Persian: پنتي, also Romanized as Penetī; also known as Lanīţī, Panīţī, and Tanīţī) is a village in Pian Rural District, in the Central District of Izeh County, Khuzestan Province, Iran. At the 2006 census, its population was 136, in 26 families.
