= Hajji Kamal =

Hajji Kamal حاجي كمال
- Village
- Location within Iran
- Coordinates: 31°45′00″N 50°19′12″E
- Country: Iran
- Province: Khuzestan
- County: Izeh
- Bakhsh: Dehdez
- Rural District: Dehdez

Population (2006)
  - Total: 420
- Time zone: UTC+3:30 (IRST)
  - Summer (DST): UTC+4:30 (IRDT)

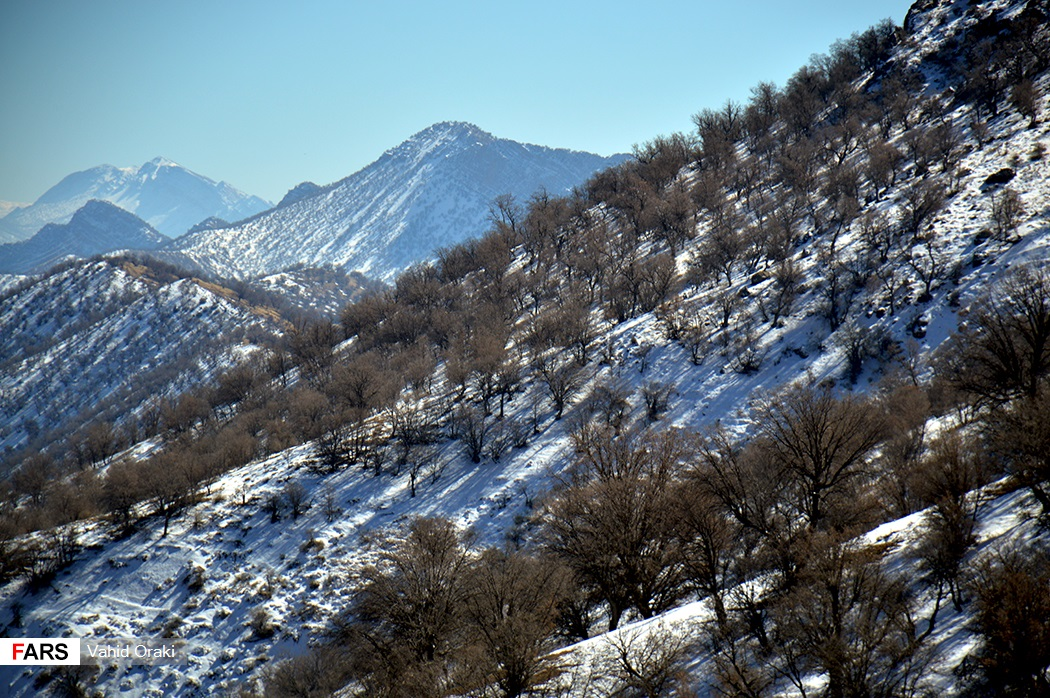

Hajji Kamal (Persian: حاجي كمال, also Romanized as Ḩājjī Kamāl) is a village in Dehdez Rural District, Dehdez District, Izeh County, Khuzestan Province, Iran. At the 2006 census, its population was 420, in 72 families.
