= Mehranan-e Heydari =

Mehranan-e Heydari مهرنان حيدري
- Village
- Location within Iran
- Coordinates: 32°01′23″N 49°50′53″E
- Country: Iran
- Province: Khuzestan
- County: Izeh
- Bakhsh: Susan
- Rural District: Susan-e Gharbi

Population (2006)
  - Total: 131
- Time zone: UTC+3:30 (IRST)
  - Summer (DST): UTC+4:30 (IRDT)

Mehranan-e Heydari (Persian: مهرنان حيدري, also Romanized as Mehranān-e Ḩeydarī; also known as Mehranān-e Bālā) is a village in Susan-e Gharbi Rural District, Susan District, Izeh County, Khuzestan Province, Iran. At the 2006 census, its population was 131, in 25 families.
