= Lirzard =

Lirzard ليرزرد
- Village
- Location within Iran
- Coordinates: 31°50′01″N 50°07′06″E
- Country: Iran
- Province: Khuzestan
- County: Izeh
- Bakhsh: Dehdez
- Rural District: Donbaleh Rud-e Shomali

Population (2006)
  - Total: 23
- Time zone: UTC+3:30 (IRST)
  - Summer (DST): UTC+4:30 (IRDT)

Lirzard (Persian: ليرزرد, also Romanized as Līrzard) is a village in Donbaleh Rud-e Shomali Rural District, Dehdez District, Izeh County, Khuzestan Province, Iran. At the 2006 census, its population was 23, in 4 families.
