= Darreh Chineh =

Darreh Chineh دره چينه
- Village
- Location within Iran
- Coordinates: 31°54′25″N 50°02′53″E
- Country: Iran
- Province: Khuzestan
- County: Izeh
- Bakhsh: Susan
- Rural District: Susan-e Sharqi

Population (2006)
  - Total: 84
- Time zone: UTC+3:30 (IRST)
  - Summer (DST): UTC+4:30 (IRDT)

Darreh Chineh (Persian: دره چينه, also Romanized as Darreh Chīneh; also known as Darreh Chīneh-ye Pā’īn) is a village in Susan-e Sharqi Rural District, Susan District, Izeh County, Khuzestan province, Iran. At the 2006 census, its population was 84, in 17 families.
