= Gur Parviz =

Gur Parviz گورپرويز
- Village
- Location within Iran
- Coordinates: 31°33′56″N 50°17′11″E
- Country: Iran
- Province: Khuzestan
- County: Izeh
- Bakhsh: Dehdez
- Rural District: Donbaleh Rud-e Jonubi

Population (2006)
  - Total: 339
- Time zone: UTC+3:30 (IRST)
  - Summer (DST): UTC+4:30 (IRDT)

Gur Parviz (Persian: گورپرويز, also Romanized as Gūr Parvīz) is a village in Donbaleh Rud-e Jonubi Rural District, Dehdez District, Izeh County, Khuzestan Province, Iran, located 293 miles (471 km) south of the country's capital, Tehran. At the 2006 census, its population was 339, in 59 families.
