= Shahrak-e Ab Zalu =

Shahrak-e Ab Zalu شهرك ابزالو
- Village
- Country: Iran
- Province: Khuzestan
- County: Izeh
- Bakhsh: Central
- Rural District: Margha

Population (2006)
  - Total: 181
- Time zone: UTC+3:30 (IRST)
  - Summer (DST): UTC+4:30 (IRDT)

Shahrak-e Ab Zalu (Persian: شهرك ابزالو, also Romanized as Shahrak-e Āb Zālū) is a village in Margha Rural District, in the Central District of Izeh County, Khuzestan Province, Iran. At the 2006 census, its population was 181, in 29 families.
