= Darreh-ye Lebad =

Darreh-ye Lebad دره لبد
- Village
- Location within Iran
- Coordinates: 32°02′30″N 49°41′51″E
- Country: Iran
- Province: Khuzestan
- County: Izeh
- Bakhsh: Central
- Rural District: Pian

Population (2006)
  - Total: 94
- Time zone: UTC+3:30 (IRST)
  - Summer (DST): UTC+4:30 (IRDT)

Darreh-ye Lebad (Persian: دره لبد; also known as Darrehleb) is a village in Pian Rural District, in the Central District of Izeh County, Khuzestan Province, Iran. At the 2006 census, its population was 94, in 19 families.
