= Faleh =

Faleh فالح
- Village
- Location within Iran
- Coordinates: 31°32′53″N 50°20′20″E
- Country: Iran
- Province: Khuzestan
- County: Izeh
- Bakhsh: Dehdez
- Rural District: Donbaleh Rud-e Jonubi

Population (2006)
  - Total: 499
- Time zone: UTC+3:30 (IRST)
  - Summer (DST): UTC+4:30 (IRDT)

Faleh (Persian: فالح, also Romanized as Fāleḩ and Fāleh; also known as Faleh Donbaleh Rood) is a village in Donbaleh Rud-e Jonubi Rural District, Dehdez District, Izeh County, Khuzestan Province, Iran. At the 2006 census, its population was 499, in 98 families.

Women there are known for the colorful masks they wear.
