= Qaleh Lava =

Qaleh Lava قلعه لوا
- Village
- Location within Iran
- Coordinates: 31°50′59″N 50°07′08″E
- Country: Iran
- Province: Khuzestan
- County: Izeh
- Bakhsh: Dehdez
- Rural District: Donbaleh Rud-e Shomali

Population (2006)
  - Total: 83
- Time zone: UTC+3:30 (IRST)
  - Summer (DST): UTC+4:30 (IRDT)

Qaleh Lava (Persian: قلعه لوا, also Romanized as Qal‘eh Lavā) is a village in Donbaleh Rud-e Shomali Rural District, Dehdez District, Izeh County, Khuzestan Province, Iran. At the 2006 census, its population was 83, in 13 families.
