= Nal Eshkanun =

Nal Eshkanun نال اشكنون
- Village
- Country: Iran
- Province: Khuzestan
- County: Izeh
- Bakhsh: Central
- Rural District: Holayjan

Population (2006)
  - Total: 216
- Time zone: UTC+3:30 (IRST)
  - Summer (DST): UTC+4:30 (IRDT)

Nal Eshkanun (Persian: نال اشكنون, also Romanized as Nāl Eshkanūn) is a village in Holayjan Rural District, in the Central District of Izeh County, Khuzestan Province, Iran. At the 2006 census, its population was 216, in 41 families.
