= Par Siah =

Par Siah پرسياه
- Village
- Location within Iran
- Coordinates: 31°57′06″N 49°37′32″E
- Country: Iran
- Province: Khuzestan
- County: Izeh
- Bakhsh: Central
- Rural District: Margha

Population (2006)
  - Total: 197
- Time zone: UTC+3:30 (IRST)
  - Summer (DST): UTC+4:30 (IRDT)

Par Siah (Persian: پرسياه, also Romanized as Par Sīāh and Par Seyāh; also known as Par Sīāh-e ‘Olyā) is a village in Margha Rural District, in the Central District of Izeh County, Khuzestan Province, Iran. At the 2006 census, its population was 197, in 36 families.
