= Kaft Chahvar =

Kaft Chahvar كفت چهوار
- Village
- Location within Iran
- Coordinates: 31°59′56″N 49°43′39″E
- Country: Iran
- Province: Khuzestan
- County: Izeh
- Bakhsh: Central
- Rural District: Pian

Population (2006)
  - Total: 254
- Time zone: UTC+3:30 (IRST)
  - Summer (DST): UTC+4:30 (IRDT)

Kaft Chahvar (Persian: كفت چهوار, also Romanized as Kaft Chahvār) is a village in Pian Rural District, in the Central District of Izeh County, Khuzestan Province, Iran. At the 2006 census, its population was 254, in 49 families.
