= Darreh Jehud =

Darreh Jehud دره جهود
- Village
- Location within Iran
- Coordinates: 31°41′17″N 50°11′42″E
- Country: Iran
- Province: Khuzestan
- County: Izeh
- Bakhsh: Dehdez
- Rural District: Dehdez

Population (2006)
  - Total: 89
- Time zone: UTC+3:30 (IRST)
  - Summer (DST): UTC+4:30 (IRDT)

Darreh Jehud (Persian: دره جهود, also Romanized as Darreh Jehūd) is a village in Dehdez Rural District, Dehdez District, Izeh County, Khuzestan Province, Iran. At the 2006 census, its population was 89, in 15 families.
