= Monjafkeh =

Monjafkeh منجفكه
- Village
- Location within Iran
- Coordinates: 31°58′21″N 49°52′46″E
- Country: Iran
- Province: Khuzestan
- County: Izeh
- Bakhsh: Susan
- Rural District: Susan-e Gharbi

Population (2006)
  - Total: 251
- Time zone: UTC+3:30 (IRST)
  - Summer (DST): UTC+4:30 (IRDT)

Monjafkeh (Persian: منجفكه) is a village in Susan-e Gharbi Rural District, Susan District, Izeh County, Khuzestan Province, Iran. At the 2006 census, its population was 251, in 44 families.
