= Gad-e Kuh =

Gad-e Kuh گادكوه
- Village
- Location within Iran
- Coordinates: 32°11′58″N 49°46′46″E
- Country: Iran
- Province: Khuzestan
- County: Izeh
- Bakhsh: Central
- Rural District: Pian

Population (2006)
  - Total: 95
- Time zone: UTC+3:30 (IRST)
  - Summer (DST): UTC+4:30 (IRDT)

Gad-e Kuh (Persian: گادكوه, also Romanized as Gād-e Kūh) is a village in Pian Rural District, in the Central District of Izeh County, Khuzestan Province, Iran. At the 2006 census, its population was 95, in 18 families.
