= Kalmat-e Shalu =

Kalmat-e Shalu كلمت شالو
- Village
- Location within Iran
- Coordinates: 31°44′25″N 50°12′29″E
- Country: Iran
- Province: Khuzestan
- County: Izeh
- Bakhsh: Dehdez
- Rural District: Donbaleh Rud-e Shomali

Population (2006)
  - Total: 349
- Time zone: UTC+3:30 (IRST)
  - Summer (DST): UTC+4:30 (IRDT)

Kalmat-e Shalu (Persian: كلمت شالو, also Romanized as Kalmat-e Shālū; also known as Kalmat) is a village in Donbaleh Rud-e Shomali Rural District, Dehdez District, Izeh County, Khuzestan Province, Iran. At the 2006 census, its population was 349, in 67 families.
