= Qaleh Sard-e Bala =

Qaleh Sard-e Bala قلعه سردبالا
- Village
- Location within Iran
- Coordinates: 31°44′39″N 50°15′38″E
- Country: Iran
- Province: Khuzestan
- County: Izeh
- Bakhsh: Dehdez
- Rural District: Dehdez

Population (2006)
  - Total: 118
- Time zone: UTC+3:30 (IRST)
  - Summer (DST): UTC+4:30 (IRDT)

Qaleh Sard-e Bala (Persian: قلعه سردبالا, also Romanized as Qalʿeh Sard-e Bālā; also known as Qalehsard-e Bālā) is a village in Dehdez Rural District, Dehdez District, Izeh County, Khuzestan Province, Iran. At the 2006 census, its population was 118, in 22 families.
