= Lah Bid =

Lah Bid لهبيد
- Village
- Location within Iran
- Coordinates: 31°46′03″N 50°17′55″E
- Country: Iran
- Province: Khuzestan
- County: Izeh
- Bakhsh: Dehdez
- Rural District: Dehdez

Population (2006)
  - Total: 106
- Time zone: UTC+3:30 (IRST)
  - Summer (DST): UTC+4:30 (IRDT)

Lah Bid (Persian: لهبيد, also Romanized as Lah Bīd) is a village in Dehdez Rural District, Dehdez District, Izeh County, Khuzestan Province, Iran. At the 2006 census, its population was 106, in 22 families.
