= Chal Abza =

Chal Abza چال ابزا
- Village
- Location within Iran
- Coordinates: 31°58′28″N 49°59′36″E
- Country: Iran
- Province: Khuzestan
- County: Izeh
- Bakhsh: Susan
- Rural District: Susan-e Sharqi

Population (2006)
  - Total: 417
- Time zone: UTC+3:30 (IRST)
  - Summer (DST): UTC+4:30 (IRDT)

Chal Abza (Persian: چال ابزا, also Romanized as Chāl Ābzā; also known as Chāl Ābzār) is a village in Susan-e Sharqi Rural District, Susan District, Izeh County, Khuzestan Province, Iran. At the 2006 census, its population was 417, in 71 families.
