= Nepyan =

Nepyan نپيان
- Village
- Location within Iran
- Coordinates: 32°00′03″N 49°43′21″E
- Country: Iran
- Province: Khuzestan
- County: Izeh
- Bakhsh: Susan
- Rural District: Susan-e Gharbi

Population (2006)
  - Total: 98
- Time zone: UTC+3:30 (IRST)
  - Summer (DST): UTC+4:30 (IRDT)

Nepyan (Persian: نپيان, also Romanized as Nepyān; also known as Peyān) is a village in Susan-e Gharbi Rural District, Susan District, Izeh County, Khuzestan Province, Iran. At the 2006 census, its population was 98, in 16 families.
