= Jadvalkun =

Jadvalkun جدول كون
- Village
- Location within Iran
- Coordinates: 31°33′39″N 50°17′17″E
- Country: Iran
- Province: Khuzestan
- County: Izeh
- Bakhsh: Dehdez
- Rural District: Donbaleh Rud-e Jonubi

Population (2006)
  - Total: 251
- Time zone: UTC+3:30 (IRST)
  - Summer (DST): UTC+4:30 (IRDT)

Jadvalkun (Persian: جدول كون, also Romanized as Jadvalkūn; also known as Jadvalkān) is a village in Donbaleh Rud-e Jonubi Rural District, Dehdez District, Izeh County, Khuzestan Province, Iran. At the 2006 census, its population was 251, in 47 families.
