= Kalkhengak =

Kalkhengak كل خنگك
- Village
- Location within Iran
- Coordinates: 32°05′31″N 49°42′26″E
- Country: Iran
- Province: Khuzestan
- County: Izeh
- Bakhsh: Central
- Rural District: Pian

Population (2006)
  - Total: 45
- Time zone: UTC+3:30 (IRST)
  - Summer (DST): UTC+4:30 (IRDT)

Kalkhengak (Persian: كل خنگك; also known as Kalkhong and Kalkhūnkag) is a village in Pian Rural District, in the Central District of Izeh County, Khuzestan Province, Iran. At the 2006 census, its population was 45, in 6 families.
