= Par Khalil =

Par Khalil پرخليل
- Village
- Location within Iran
- Coordinates: 31°57′18″N 49°38′00″E
- Country: Iran
- Province: Khuzestan
- County: Izeh
- Bakhsh: Central
- Rural District: Margha

Population (2006)
  - Total: 78
- Time zone: UTC+3:30 (IRST)
  - Summer (DST): UTC+4:30 (IRDT)

Par Khalil (Persian: پرخليل, also Romanized as Par Khalīl) is a village in Margha Rural District, in the Central District of Izeh County, Khuzestan Province, Iran. At the 2006 census, its population was 78, in 13 families.
