= Pas Tang =

Pas Tang پس تنگ
- Village
- Location within Iran
- Coordinates: 31°55′35″N 50°02′05″E
- Country: Iran
- Province: Khuzestan
- County: Izeh
- Bakhsh: Susan
- Rural District: Susan-e Sharqi

Population (2006)
  - Total: 131
- Time zone: UTC+3:30 (IRST)
  - Summer (DST): UTC+4:30 (IRDT)

Pas Tang (Persian: پس تنگ, also Romanized as Pass Tang; also known as Pas Chāt) is a village in Susan-e Sharqi Rural District, Susan District, Izeh County, Khuzestan Province, Iran. At the 2006 census, its population was 131, in 24 families.
