= Adin Ali Nazri =

Adin Ali Nazri ادين علي نظري
- Village
- Country: Iran
- Province: Khuzestan
- County: Izeh
- Bakhsh: Susan
- Rural District: Susan-e Gharbi

Population (2006)
  - Total: 201
- Time zone: UTC+3:30 (IRST)
  - Summer (DST): UTC+4:30 (IRDT)

Adin Ali Nazri (Persian: ادين علي نظري, also Romanized as Ādīn ʿAlī Naẓrī) is a village in Susan-e Gharbi Rural District, Susan District, Izeh County, Khuzestan Province, Iran. At the 2006 census, its population was 201, in 31 families.
