= Guz Bilva Hajji Nasrallah =

Guz Bilva Hajji Nasrallah گوض بیلواحاجی نصرالله
- Village
- Country: Iran
- Province: Khuzestan
- County: Izeh
- Bakhsh: Central
- Rural District: Pian

Population (2006)
  - Total: 29
- Time zone: UTC+3:30 (IRST)
  - Summer (DST): UTC+4:30 (IRDT)

Guz Bilva Hajji Nasrallah (Persian: گوض بیلواحاجی نصرالله, also Romanized as Gūz̤ Bīlvā Ḩājjī Naṣrāllah) is a village in Pian Rural District, in the Central District of Izeh County, Khuzestan Province, Iran. At the 2006 census, its population was 29, in 6 families.
