= Kal-e Naqd Ali =

Kal-e Naqd Ali كل نقدعلي
- Village
- Location within Iran
- Coordinates: 31°39′46″N 50°19′42″E
- Country: Iran
- Province: Khuzestan
- County: Izeh
- Bakhsh: Dehdez
- Rural District: Dehdez

Population (2006)
  - Total: 119
- Time zone: UTC+3:30 (IRST)
  - Summer (DST): UTC+4:30 (IRDT)

Kal-e Naqd Ali (Persian: كل نقدعلي, also Romanized as Kal-e Naqd ‘Alī) is a village in Dehdez Rural District, Dehdez District, Izeh County, Khuzestan Province, Iran. At the 2006 census, its population was 119, in 26 families.
