= Keli Malek =

Keli Malek كليملك
- Village
- Location within Iran
- Coordinates: 31°43′06″N 50°14′41″E
- Country: Iran
- Province: Khuzestan
- County: Izeh
- Bakhsh: Dehdez
- Rural District: Dehdez

Population (2006)
  - Total: 617
- Time zone: UTC+3:30 (IRST)
  - Summer (DST): UTC+4:30 (IRDT)

Keli Malek (Persian: كليملك, also Romanized as Kelī Malek) is a village in Dehdez Rural District, Dehdez District, Izeh County, Khuzestan Province, Iran. On the 2006 census, its population was 617, in 99 families.
