= Beyzeh Tak =

Beyzeh Tak بيضي تك
- Village
- Location within Iran
- Coordinates: 31°55′43″N 49°46′56″E
- Country: Iran
- Province: Khuzestan
- County: Izeh
- Bakhsh: Central
- Rural District: Howmeh-ye Gharbi

Population (2006)
  - Total: 421
- Time zone: UTC+3:30 (IRST)
  - Summer (DST): UTC+4:30 (IRDT)

Beyzeh Tak (Persian: بيضي تك, also Romanized as Beyẕeh Tak) is a village in Howmeh-ye Gharbi Rural District, in the Central District of Izeh County, Khuzestan Province, Iran. At the 2006 census, its population was 421, in 70 families.
