= Sheykh Kheyri =

Sheykh Kheyri شيخ خيري
- Village
- Country: Iran
- Province: Khuzestan
- County: Izeh
- Bakhsh: Central
- Rural District: Margha

Population (2006)
  - Total: 20
- Time zone: UTC+3:30 (IRST)
  - Summer (DST): UTC+4:30 (IRDT)

Sheykh Kheyri (Persian: شيخ خيري, also Romanized as Sheykh Kheyrī) is a village in Margha Rural District, in the Central District of Izeh County, Khuzestan Province, Iran. At the 2006 census, its population was 20, in 4 families.
