= Deh-e Howz =

Deh-e Howz ده حوض
- Village
- Location within Iran
- Coordinates: 32°03′10″N 49°50′13″E
- Country: Iran
- Province: Khuzestan
- County: Izeh
- Bakhsh: Susan
- Rural District: Susan-e Gharbi

Population (2006)
  - Total: 235
- Time zone: UTC+3:30 (IRST)
  - Summer (DST): UTC+4:30 (IRDT)

Deh-e Howz (Persian: ده حوض, also Romanized as Deh-e Ḩowẕ, Deh Ḩowz, and Deh Hoz; also known as Ḩowz) is a village in Susan-e Gharbi Rural District, Susan District, Izeh County, Khuzestan Province, Iran. As of the 2006 census, its population was 235, in 42 families.
