= Pameleh =

Pameleh پامله
- Village
- Location within Iran
- Coordinates: 31°50′56″N 50°06′43″E
- Country: Iran
- Province: Khuzestan
- County: Izeh
- Bakhsh: Dehdez
- Rural District: Donbaleh Rud-e Shomali

Population (2006)
  - Total: 67
- Time zone: UTC+3:30 (IRST)
  - Summer (DST): UTC+4:30 (IRDT)

Pameleh (Persian: پامله, also Romanized as Pāmeleh) is a village in Donbaleh Rud-e Shomali Rural District, Dehdez District, Izeh County, Khuzestan Province, Iran. At the 2006 census, its population was 67, in 13 families.
