= Sar Sahra =

Sar Sahra سرصحرا
- Village
- Location within Iran
- Coordinates: 31°52′23″N 50°15′42″E
- Country: Iran
- Province: Khuzestan
- County: Izeh
- Bakhsh: Dehdez
- Rural District: Donbaleh Rud-e Shomali

Population (2006)
  - Total: 149
- Time zone: UTC+3:30 (IRST)
  - Summer (DST): UTC+4:30 (IRDT)

Sar Sahra (Persian: سرصحرا, also Romanized as Sar Şaḩrā) is a village in Donbaleh Rud-e Shomali Rural District, Dehdez District, Izeh County, Khuzestan Province, Iran. At the 2006 census, its population was 149, in 28 families.
