= Ab Rah =

Ab Rah اب راه
- Village
- Location within Iran
- Coordinates: 31°48′54″N 50°08′00″E
- Country: Iran
- Province: Khuzestan
- County: Izeh
- Bakhsh: Dehdez
- Rural District: Donbaleh Rud-e Shomali

Population (2006)
  - Total: 62
- Time zone: UTC+3:30 (IRST)
  - Summer (DST): UTC+4:30 (IRDT)

Ab Rah (Persian: اب راه, also Romanized as Āb Rāh) is a village in Donbaleh Rud-e Shomali Rural District, Dehdez District, Izeh County, Khuzestan province, Iran. At the 2006 census, its population was 62, in 12 families.
