= Bardpareh-ye Hasan =

Bardpareh-ye Hasan بردپاره حسن
- Village
- Location within Iran
- Coordinates: 32°07′07″N 49°42′47″E
- Country: Iran
- Province: Khuzestan
- County: Izeh
- Bakhsh: Central
- Rural District: Pian

Population (2006)
  - Total: 129
- Time zone: UTC+3:30 (IRST)
  - Summer (DST): UTC+4:30 (IRDT)

Bardpareh-ye Hasan (Persian: بردپاره حسن, also Romanized as Bardpāreh-ye Ḩasan; also known as Bardpāreh) is a village in Pian Rural District, in the Central District of Izeh County, Khuzestan Province, Iran. At the 2006 census, its population was 129, in 19 families.
