= Galleh-ye Meshk =

Galleh-ye Meshk گله مشك
- Village
- Location within Iran
- Coordinates: 32°02′03″N 49°44′07″E
- Country: Iran
- Province: Khuzestan
- County: Izeh
- Bakhsh: Central
- Rural District: Pian

Population (2006)
  - Total: 127
- Time zone: UTC+3:30 (IRST)
  - Summer (DST): UTC+4:30 (IRDT)

Galleh-ye Meshk (Persian: گله مشك; also known as Galleh-ye Mishi) is a village in Pian Rural District, in the Central District of Izeh County, Khuzestan Province, Iran. At the 2006 census, its population was 127, in 19 families.
