= Takht-e Sar Ab =

Takht-e Sar Ab, Iran تخت سراب
- Village
- Location within Iran
- Coordinates: 32°04′02″N 49°45′34″E
- Country: Iran
- Province: Khuzestan
- County: Izeh
- Bakhsh: Central
- Rural District: Pian

Population (2006)
  - Total: 31
- Time zone: UTC+3:30 (IRST)
  - Summer (DST): UTC+4:30 (IRDT)

Takht-e Sar Ab (Persian: تخت سراب, also Romanized as Takht-e Sar Āb) is a village in Pian Rural District, in the Central District of Izeh County, Khuzestan Province, Iran. At the 2006 census, its population was 31, in 4 families.
