= Darreh Khun-e Faleh =

Darreh Khun-e Faleh دره خون فالح
- Village
- Location within Iran
- Coordinates: 31°32′55″N 50°20′45″E
- Country: Iran
- Province: Khuzestan
- County: Izeh
- Bakhsh: Dehdez
- Rural District: Donbaleh Rud-e Jonubi

Population (2006)
  - Total: 26
- Time zone: UTC+3:30 (IRST)
  - Summer (DST): UTC+4:30 (IRDT)

Darreh Khun-e Faleh (Persian: دره خون فالح, also Romanized as Darreh Khūn-e Fāleḩ) is a village in Donbaleh Rud-e Jonubi Rural District, Dehdez District, Izeh County, Khuzestan Province, Iran. At the 2006 census, its population was 26, in 7 families.
