= Konar Dun-e Olya =

Konar Dun-e Olya كناردون عليا
- Village
- Location within Iran
- Coordinates: 31°58′29″N 49°37′15″E
- Country: Iran
- Province: Khuzestan
- County: Izeh
- Bakhsh: Central
- Rural District: Margha

Population (2006)
  - Total: 75
- Time zone: UTC+3:30 (IRST)
  - Summer (DST): UTC+4:30 (IRDT)

Konar Dun-e Olya (Persian: كناردون عليا; romanized as Konār Dūn-e ‘Olyā; also known as Konār Dūn) is a village in the Margha Rural District, in the Central District of Izeh County, Khuzestan Province, Iran. As of the 2006 census, its population was 75 people in 12 families.
