= Kal Khvajeh =

Kal Khvajeh كل خواجه
- Village
- Location within Iran
- Coordinates: 31°39′58″N 50°19′59″E
- Country: Iran
- Province: Khuzestan
- County: Izeh
- Bakhsh: Dehdez
- Rural District: Dehdez

Population (2006)
  - Total: 144
- Time zone: UTC+3:30 (IRST)
  - Summer (DST): UTC+4:30 (IRDT)

Kal Khvajeh (Persian: كل خواجه, also Romanized as Kal Khvājeh) is a village in Dehdez Rural District, Dehdez District, Izeh County, Khuzestan Province, Iran. At the 2006 census, its population was 144, in 34 families.
