= Oshtor Gard =

Oshtor Gard اشترگرد
- Village
- Location within Iran
- Coordinates: 31°49′35″N 49°45′22″E
- Country: Iran
- Province: Khuzestan
- County: Izeh
- Bakhsh: Central
- Rural District: Holayjan

Population (2006)
  - Total: 72
- Time zone: UTC+3:30 (IRST)
  - Summer (DST): UTC+4:30 (IRDT)

Oshtor Gard (Persian: اشترگرد) is a village in Holayjan Rural District, in the Central District of Izeh County, Khuzestan Province, Iran. At the 2006 census, its population was 72, in 15 families.
