= Khong, Iran =

Khong or Khang or Khank or Khung or Khonog (Persian: خنگ) may refer to:

- Khong, Fars
- Khong-e Pir Sabz, Fars Province
- Khong Azhdar, Khuzestan Province
- Khong Azhdar-e Ali Ayavel, Khuzestan Province
- Khong Kamalvand, Khuzestan Province
- Khong Karam Alivand, Khuzestan Province
- Khong Yar Alivand, Khuzestan Province
- Khong, Kohgiluyeh and Boyer-Ahmad
- Khung, Razavi Khorasan
- Khong, South Khorasan
- Khong-e Bala, South Khorasan
