= Miangaran =

Miangaran or Mian Garan or Meyangaran (Persian: ميان گران or ميانگران) may refer to:

- Miangaran, Hamadan
- Miangaran, Khuzestan
- Miangaran-e Olya, Khuzestan Province
- Miangaran-e Sofla, Khuzestan Province
- Miangaran, Lorestan
- Mian Garan, Lorestan
