= Nowtarki =

Nowtarki (Persian: نوتركي) may refer to:

- Nowtarki-ye Gharibi
- Nowtarki-ye Mokhtari
- Nowtarki-ye Tahmasebi
