= Don Som =

Coordinates: 14°02′N 105°53′E

Don Som is an island part of the Si Phan Don (Lao: ສີ່ພັນດອນ, meaning '4000 islands') riverine archipelago in the Mekong River, Khong District, Champasak Province in southern Laos. It is the second largest island of the area and is located between Don Det in the south and the largest of the islands, Don Khong, in the north.

The island is about 13 kilometres long (north-south), and 3 kilometres at its widest point. It has a population of approximately 7,000 people, living in 12 villages.

The local economy is predominantly based on agriculture and fishing and unlike its neighbors Don Khong, Don Det and Don Khon sees few tourists visiting the island and only has one guesthouse (in the village named Ban Thamakheb).

The villages of Don Som are: Ban Hang Som, Ban Veunsom, Ban Kengkoum, Ban Thapao, Ban Thapo, Ban Deua Tai, Ban Deua, Ban Sala, Ban Muang, Ban Thamakheb, Ban Thakham and Ban Don Som

The French painter Marc Leguay lived on Don Som in the 1930s.
