= Khong =

Khong may refer to:

- Khong District, Laos, a district of Champasak Province
  - Khong Island, in Laos
- Khong District, Nakhon Ratchasima, Thailand
- Khong, Iran (disambiguation), places in Iran

== People with the surname ==
- Lawrence Khong (born 1952), Singaporean Christian leader
- Yuen Foong Khong (born 1956), Malaysian political scientist
- Kelvin Khong (born c. 1976), Singaporean general
- Rachel Khong (born 1985), Malaysian-born American writer
- Khổng Tú Quỳnh (born 1991), Vietnamese pop singer
- Khổng Thị Hằng (born 1993), Vietnamese footballer

== See also ==
- Mekong River, also known as Khong River
