= Khang =

Khang may refer to:

- Khang people, a people of northwestern Vietnam
- Kháng language
- Khang, Iran (disambiguation), places in Iran
