= Miangaran-e Sofla =

Miangaran-e Sofla ميانگران سفلي
- Village
- Location within Iran
- Coordinates: 31°53′57″N 49°49′51″E
- Country: Iran
- Province: Khuzestan
- County: Izeh
- Bakhsh: Central
- Rural District: Howmeh-ye Gharbi

Population (2006)
  - Total: 429
- Time zone: UTC+3:30 (IRST)
  - Summer (DST): UTC+4:30 (IRDT)

Miangaran-e Sofla (Persian: ميانگران سفلي, also Romanized as Mīāngarān-e Soflá and Meyāngarān Soflá; also known as Mīāngarān-e Pā’īn) is a village in Howmeh-ye Gharbi Rural District, in the Central District of Izeh County, Khuzestan Province, Iran. At the 2006 census, its population was 429, in 78 families.
