= Don Det–Don Khon railway =

Railway line in Laos

Coordinates: 13.963556°N 105.920761°E

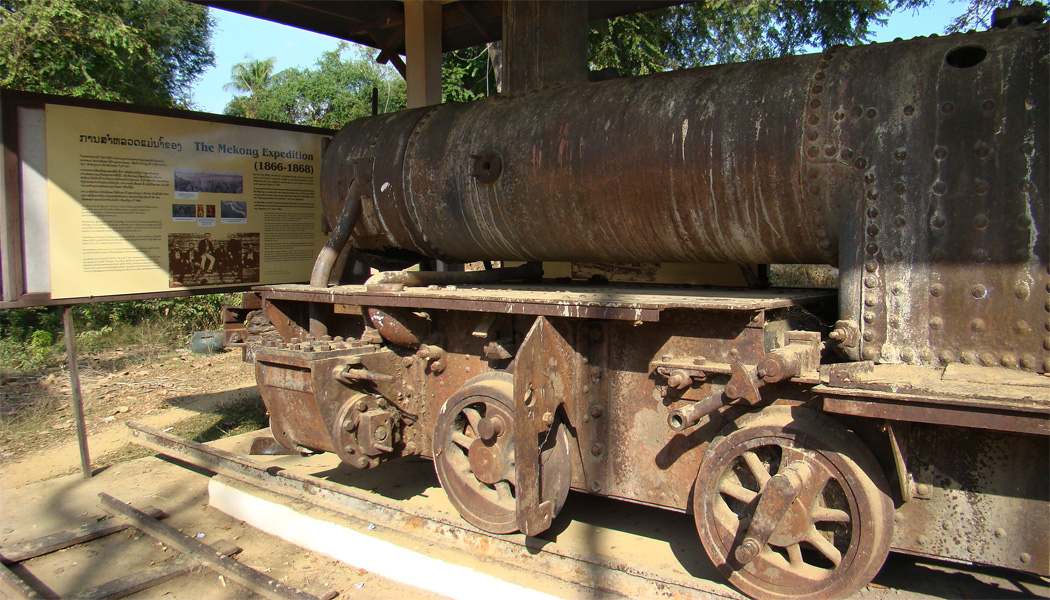
Rusted locomotive on display on Don Khon Island

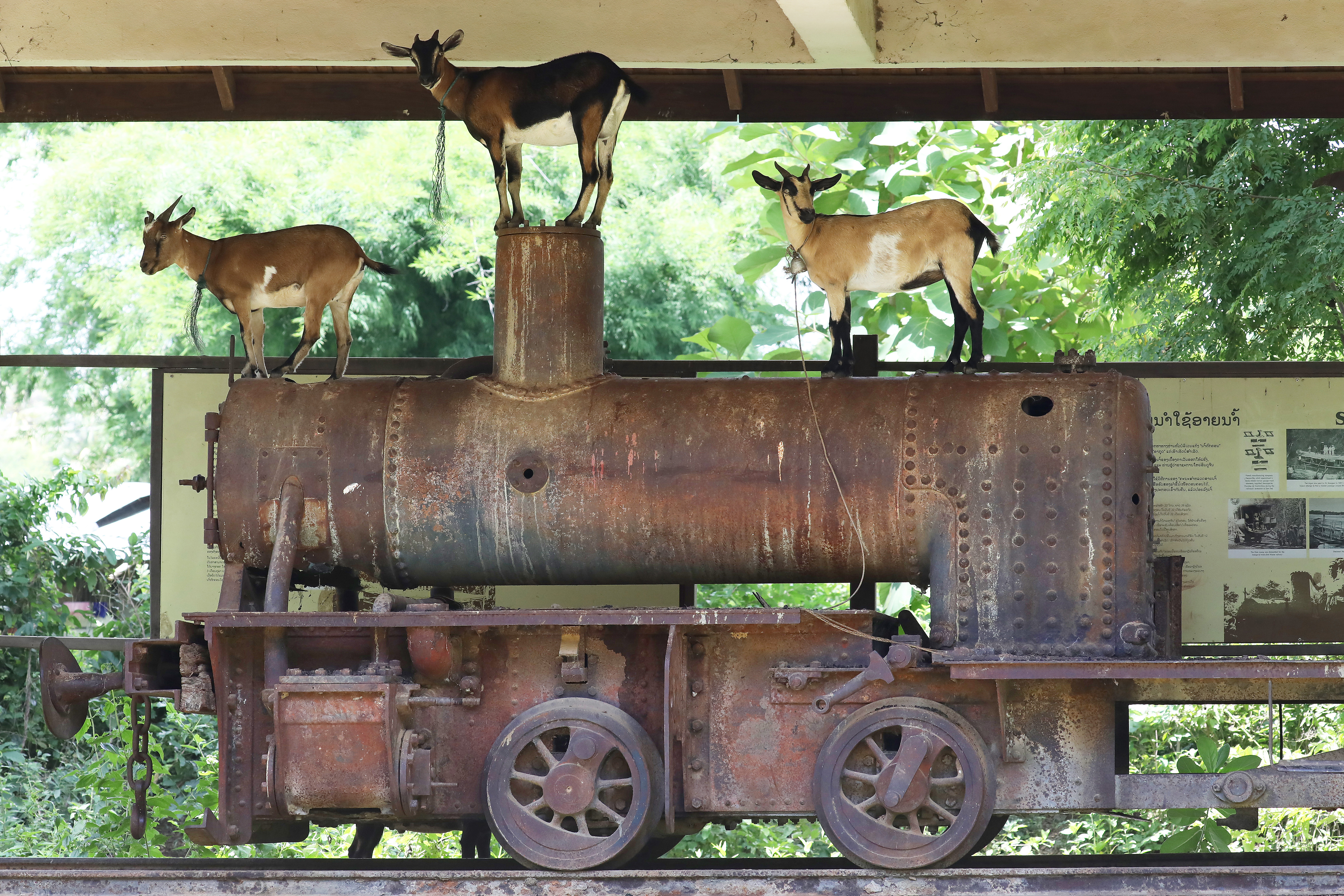
The old locomotive, hosting goats

The Don Det–Don Khon railway (sometimes spelled "Don Deth–Don Khone") was a 7-kilometre (4.3 mi)-long narrow-gauge portage railway on the islands of Don Det and Don Khon, part of the Si Phan Don (Four Thousand Islands) archipelago in Champasak Province of southern Laos. Built by the Mekong Exploration Commission, the railway was operated by the Lao State Railway. It opened in 1893, and closed in 1940 or 1949.

The railway was initially laid to 600 mm (1 ft 11 5/8 in) gauge, and may have been partially (or fully) converted to 1,000 mm (3 ft 3 3/8 in) metre gauge. It facilitated the transportation of vessels, freight and passengers along the Mekong River. The Don Det–Don Khon islands railway was the only railway built, opened and operated in Laos until 2009, when a line was opened between Nong Khai, Nong Khai Province in Thailand and the Thanaleng railway station in Dongphosy (near Vientiane).

== History ==
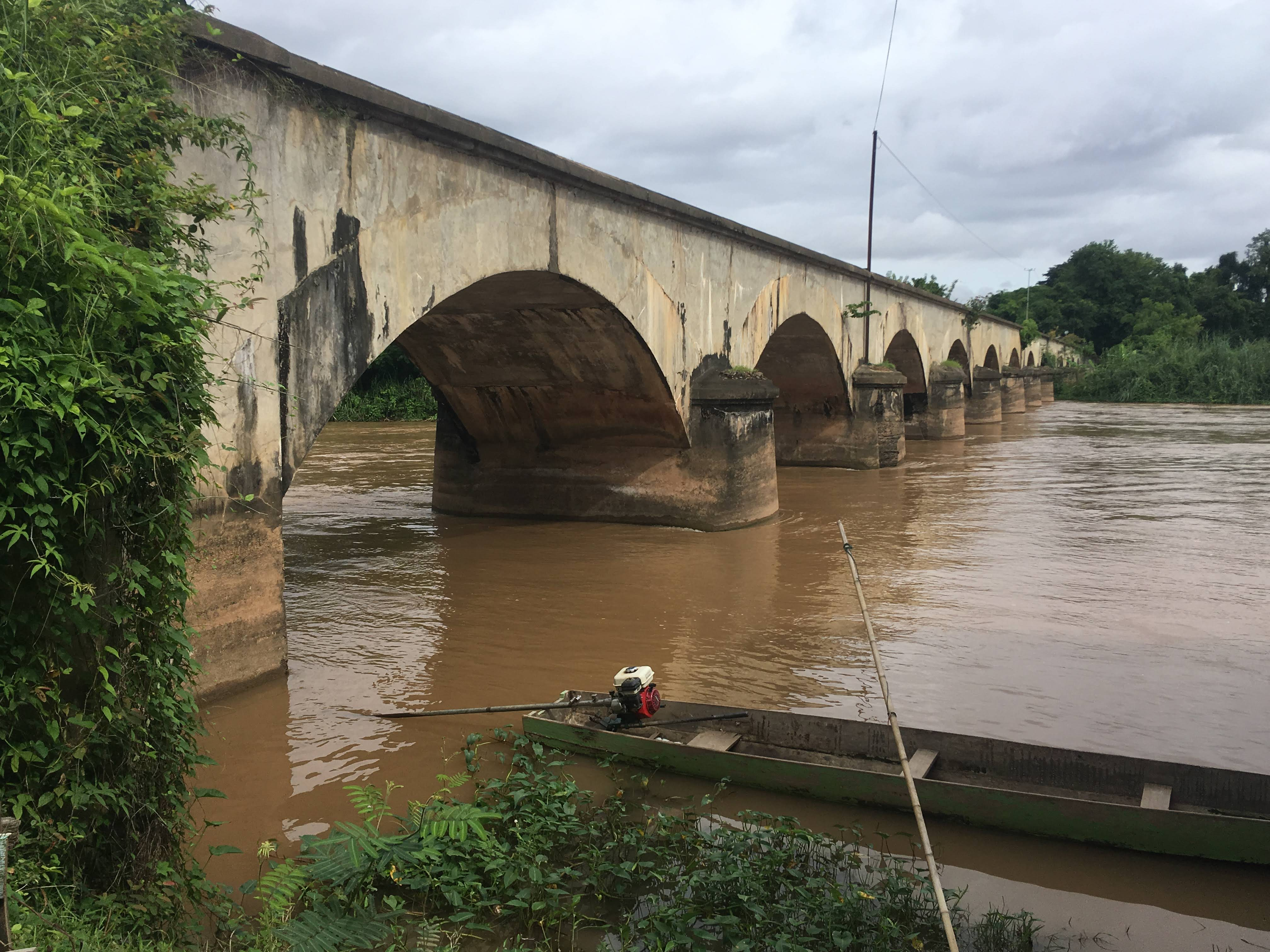
The bridge between the two islands.

=== Background ===
The French colonial administration of Indochina was determined to use the Mekong River for a route into China, and to help counter British colonial expansion in Upper Burma. The governor of Indochina saw the Mekong as "the main point of connection between the different countries of French Indo-China (Cochin-China, Cambodia, Laos and Tonkin), which will be able to communicate with each other through it". The main obstacle was in southern Laos, where the river divides into several channels with rapids (known as the Khone Phapheng Falls) at the Siphandon Islands. Attempts in 1891, 1892 and 1893 to scale the falls failed; accounts exist of steamships with "engines roaring and boilers near bursting, with hundreds of men hauling from the rocks on ropes and others pushing from the decks with pikes", and one vessel "allegedly wriggled up a narrow water-slide to within fifty metres of the top before the attempt had to be abandoned".

Alternative modes of transport were necessary. One idea came in the form of Herbert Warington Smyth, a British tidal expert living in Siam, suggested that a tramway or canal with a series of locks should be built around the falls; a canal "would satisfactorily cripple the French economy, costing about the same as the Manchester Ship Canal yet never carrying more than one ten-thousandth of its tonnage". The French settled on a small portage railway across the islands of Don Khon and (later) Don Det, which would allow specially designed vessels to be dismantled, transported on the railway, reassembled and launched further upstream.

=== Development ===
The first railway was laid on Don Khon—the more-southerly of the two islands—in 1893, when Laos became part of French Indochina (the French colonial empire in Southeast Asia). Its route stretched four kilometres, from the southeastern corner of the island (near the village of Ban Hangkhon) north-west to the northern part of the island near the village of Ban Khon. The railway was temporary for its first four years, laid in segments which could be lifted when the train had passed and relaid in front. The gun-sloops Lagrandière, Ham Luong and Massie were the first to cross the island by this method, followed by the Garcerie, Colombert and Trentinian in 1896; the latter sank in the Mekong River after a 1928 gasoline explosion. Imported Vietnamese labour hauled wagons which carried sections of the vessels. A permanent railway was laid by 1897, and a wood-burning steam locomotive replaced manpower for traction. The first seven-tonne steam locomotive was christened Paul Doumer (Governor-General of French Indochina from 1897 to 1902), and equipment was supplied by Decauville via Cochinchina. Trains could have a maximum of 12 cars (consisting of a steam locomotive, open-topped wagons and carriages), and it took an average of two trains to load a vessel. At the northern terminal, passengers transferred to a steamship on the river channel dividing Don Det and Don Khon. As the vessels could only travel when the river was in flood, during the 1910s the railway was extended three kilometres (1.9 mi) to Don Det and it terminated at a pier near Ban Khon. The outbreak of the Second World War apparently sealed the railway's fate, and the last train reportedly ran in 1940.

=== Contemporary account ===
Although there are few accounts of the railway–written or pictorial—Marthe Bassenne, a physician's wife, travelled between Phnom Penh and Luang Prabang in 1910:

The train, struggling and grating amid the clashing sound of steel, hauled us across the island, which is covered by teak trees and bamboos whose branches brushed our faces. The temperature was very high and the sun, filtering through the trees, roused noxious fever-vapours from the tangled undergrowth. Sweat caked my hair under my sun hat; the heat burned my arms through my clothes; and the mosquitoes took advantage of my predicament to attack me as they pleased, all over my hands and face…

— John Keay, Mad About The Mekong: Exploration and Empire in South East Asia

== Present-day route ==
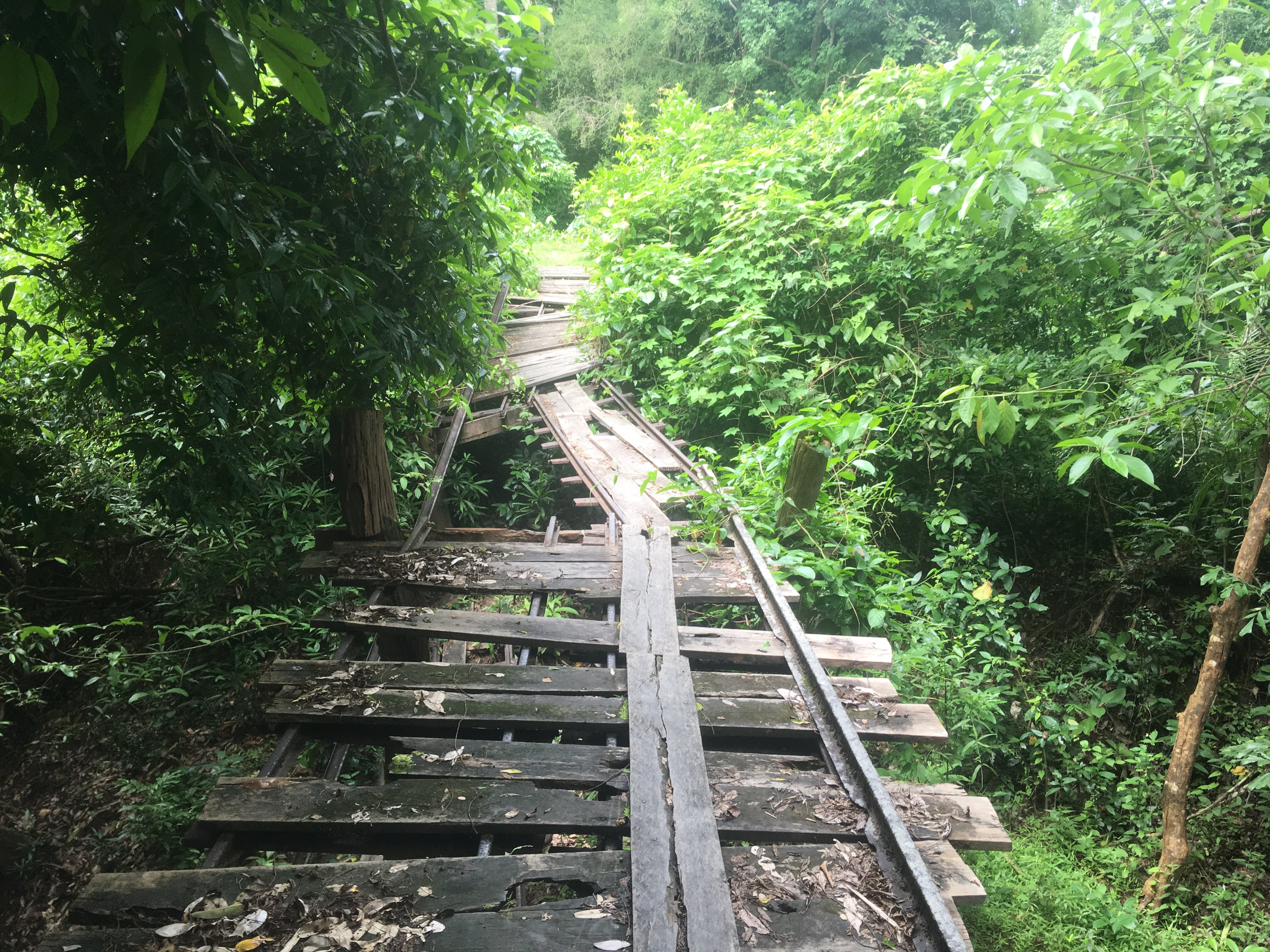
The remains of the railway on Don Khon.

Although the railway—including the 170-metre (560 ft) concrete viaduct—remains largely intact and can be walked or cycled (except for short stretches in a maintenance yard), its rails have been removed. The trackbed, consisting of compacted ballast and sand, is used to traverse the islands. Nearly all visitors reach the islands via Nakasang in Champasak Province (off Route 13), arriving by boat at Ban Hua Det on Don Det.

At Ban Khon on Don Khon, the only steam locomotive still in existence in Laos is at a former maintenance depot. Built in 1911 by Orenstein & Koppel and named Eloïse, the rusty engine sits on a short stretch of track. A shed has been constructed to protect the locomotive from further deterioration, and the section of track has been raised onto a small concrete plinth to protect the wheels from water.

== Proposed reconstruction ==
Until the first decade of the 21st century, the government of Laos made no serious attempt to reopen the railway since its closure in the 1940s. The Vientiane Times published news in December 2005 about the possible reopening of the railway by 2007 for tourism. The budget for reconstruction was an estimated US$1.5 million and, although local materials would have been sought, new rolling stock from abroad would have to be purchased. A memorandum of understanding was signed between the principal backer (the South Korean Kyungin Engineering and Construction Company) and the Laotian government, but the company backed out of the agreement. Improvements in local and regional highways and airport infrastructure have reduced the need to use the Mekong River for freight transportation in Laos.

== See also ==
- French Union
- Transport in Laos
- Vientiane–Boten railway
