= Nowtarki-ye Mokhtari =

Nowtarki-ye Mokhtari نوتركي مختاري
- Village
- Location within Iran
- Coordinates: 31°50′25″N 49°44′43″E
- Country: Iran
- Province: Khuzestan
- County: Izeh
- Bakhsh: Central
- Rural District: Howmeh-ye Gharbi

Population (2006)
  - Total: 359
- Time zone: UTC+3:30 (IRST)
  - Summer (DST): UTC+4:30 (IRDT)

Nowtarki-ye Mokhtari (Persian: نوتركي مختاري, also Romanized as Nowtarkī-ye Mokhtārī; also known as Nartarkī-ye Mokhtārī and Nowtargī-ye Mokhtārī) is a village in Howmeh-ye Gharbi Rural District, in the Central District of Izeh County, Khuzestan Province, Iran. At the 2006 census, its population was 359, in 72 families.
