= Rasfand =

Village in Khuzestan province, Iran

Rasfand Persian: راسفند
- Village
- Location within Iran
- Coordinates: 31°52′14″N 49°48′20″E
- Country: Iran
- Province: Khuzestan
- County: Izeh
- District: Central
- Rural District: Howmeh-ye Gharbi

Population (2016)
  - Total: 1,596
- Time zone: UTC+3:30 (IRST)

Rasfand (Persian: راسفند) (Note: Also romanized as Rāsfand; also known as Rāsvand and Rāswand) is a village in, and the capital of, Howmeh-ye Gharbi Rural District of the Central District of Izeh County, Khuzestan province, Iran.

== Demographics ==
=== Population ===
At the time of the 2006 National Census, the village's population was 1,135 in 189 households. The following census in 2011 counted 1,625 people in 340 households. The 2016 census measured the population of the village as 1,596 people in 330 households.
