= Khong Yar Alivand =

Khong Yar Alivand خنگ يارعلي وند
- Village
- Location within Iran
- Coordinates: 31°56′20″N 49°50′18″E
- Country: Iran
- Province: Khuzestan
- County: Izeh
- Bakhsh: Central
- Rural District: Howmeh-ye Gharbi

Population (2006)
  - Total: 138
- Time zone: UTC+3:30 (IRST)
  - Summer (DST): UTC+4:30 (IRDT)

Khong Yar Alivand (Persian: خنگ يارعلي وند, also Romanized as Khong Yār ‘Alīvand; also known as Khonak Yar ‘Alīvand and Yār ‘Alīvand) is a village in Howmeh-ye Gharbi Rural District, in the Central District of Izeh County, Khuzestan Province, Iran. At the 2006 census, its population was 138, in 20 families.
