= Miangaran-e Olya =

Miangaran-e Olya ميانگران عليا
- Village
- Location within Iran
- Coordinates: 31°54′40″N 49°49′32″E
- Country: Iran
- Province: Khuzestan
- County: Izeh
- Bakhsh: Central
- Rural District: Howmeh-ye Gharbi

Population (2006)
  - Total: 588
- Time zone: UTC+3:30 (IRST)
  - Summer (DST): UTC+4:30 (IRDT)

Miangaran-e Olya (Persian: ميانگران عليا, also Romanized as Mīāngarān-e ‘Olyā, Mīān Garān-e ‘Olyā, and Meyāngarān ‘Olyā; also known as Mīāngarān-e Bālā) is a village in Howmeh-ye Gharbi Rural District, in the Central District of Izeh County, Khuzestan Province, Iran. At the 2006 census, its population was 588, in 107 families.
