= Nowtarki-ye Gharibi =

Nowtarki-ye Gharibi نوتركي غريبي
- Village
- Location within Iran
- Coordinates: 31°50′54″N 49°45′12″E
- Country: Iran
- Province: Khuzestan
- County: Izeh
- Bakhsh: Central
- Rural District: Howmeh-ye Gharbi

Population (2006)
  - Total: 269
- Time zone: UTC+3:30 (IRST)
  - Summer (DST): UTC+4:30 (IRDT)

Nowtarki-ye Gharibi (Persian: نوتركي غريبي, also Romanized as Nowtarkī-ye Gharībī; also known as Nowtargī-ye Gharībī) is a village in Howmeh-ye Gharbi Rural District, in the Central District of Izeh County, Khuzestan Province, Iran. At the 2006 census, its population was 269, in 53 families.
