= Balutak-e Sheykhan =

Village in Khuzestan province, Iran

Balutak-e Sheykhan Persian: بلوطك شيخان
- Village
- Location within Iran
- Coordinates: 31°50′46″N 49°50′07″E
- Country: Iran
- Province: Khuzestan
- County: Izeh
- District: Central
- Rural District: Howmeh-ye Gharbi

Population (2016)
  - Total: 2,288
- Time zone: UTC+3:30 (IRST)

Balutak-e Sheykhan (Persian: بلوطك شيخان) (Note: Also romanized as Balūţak-e Sheykhān and Balūtak-e Sheykhān; also known as Boneh Sheykhān) is a village in Howmeh-ye Gharbi Rural District of the Central District of Izeh County, Khuzestan province, Iran.

== Demographics ==
=== Population ===
At the time of the 2006 National Census, the village's population was 1,315 in 239 households. The following census in 2011 counted 1,962 people in 429 households. The 2016 census measured the population of the village as 2,288 people in 522 households. It was the most populous village in its rural district.
