= Khone Phapheng Falls =

Pair of waterfalls on the Mekong River in Laos

Khone Falls
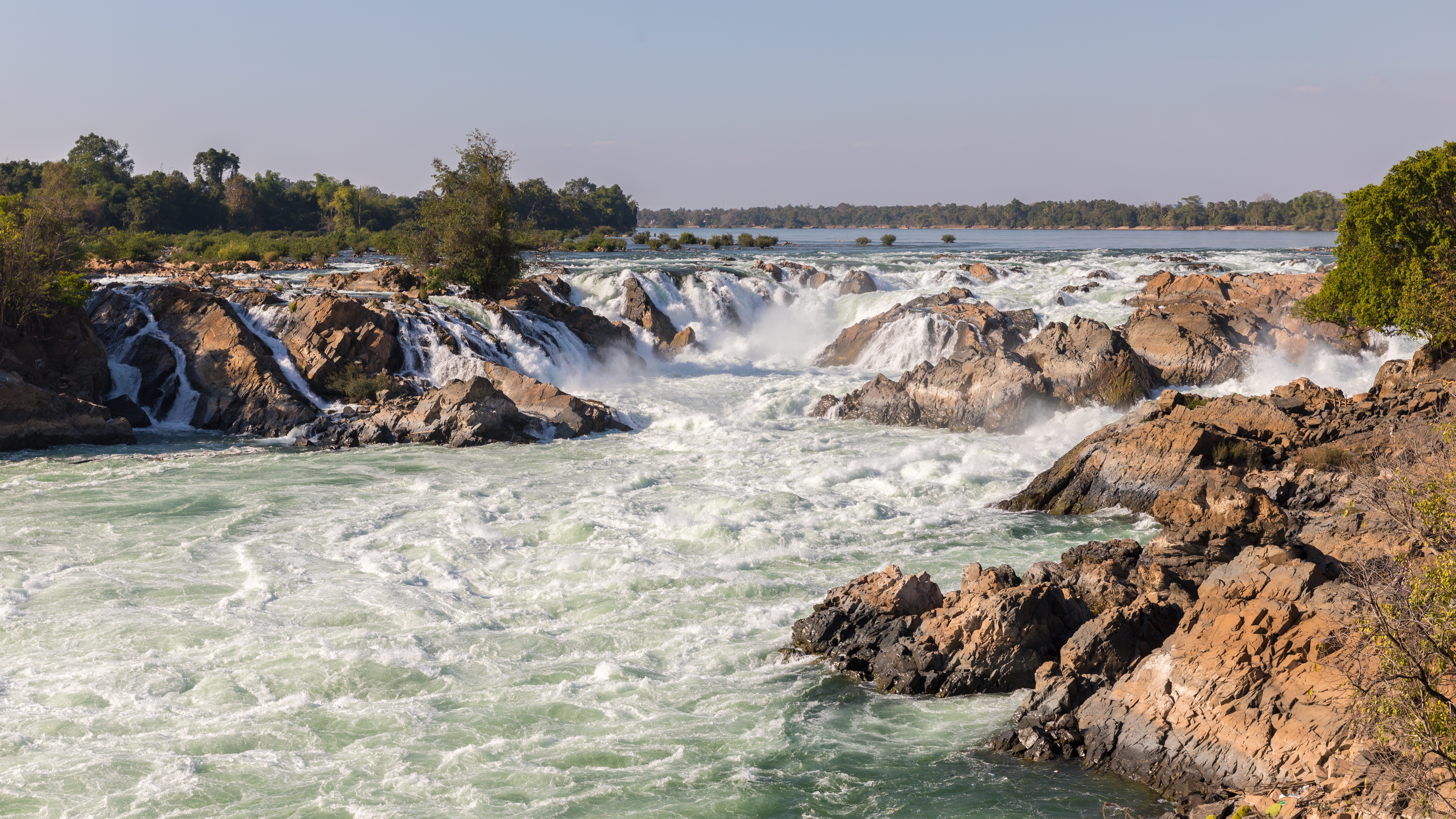
- Khone Phapheng Falls

- Location within Laos
- Location: Mekong River; Champasak Province; Laos
- Coordinates: 13°56′53″N 105°56′26″E
- Type: Cascade
- Total height: 21 m (69 ft)
- Watercourse: Mekong River

The Khone Falls and Pha Pheng Falls (Lao: ນ້ຳຕົກຕາດຄອນພະເພັງ; Khmer: ល្បាក់ខោន, Lbak Khaon) together form a waterfall located in Champasak Province on the Mekong River in southern Laos, near the border with Cambodia. It is the widest waterfall in the world at 10,783 metres (35,376 feet or 6.7 miles) in width from one edge of its multiple channels to the other.

The Khone Falls are the largest in southeast Asia, and are the main reason that the Mekong is not fully navigable into China. The falls are characterised by thousands of islands and countless waterways, giving the area its name Si Phan Don or 'the 4,000 islands'.

The highest falls reach to 21 metres (69 ft); the succession of rapids stretch 9.7 km (6.0 mi) of the river's length. The average discharge of the cataract is nearly 11,000 m^{3}/s (390,000 cu ft/s), with the highest flow on record at over 49,000 m^{3}/s (1,700,000 cu ft/s).

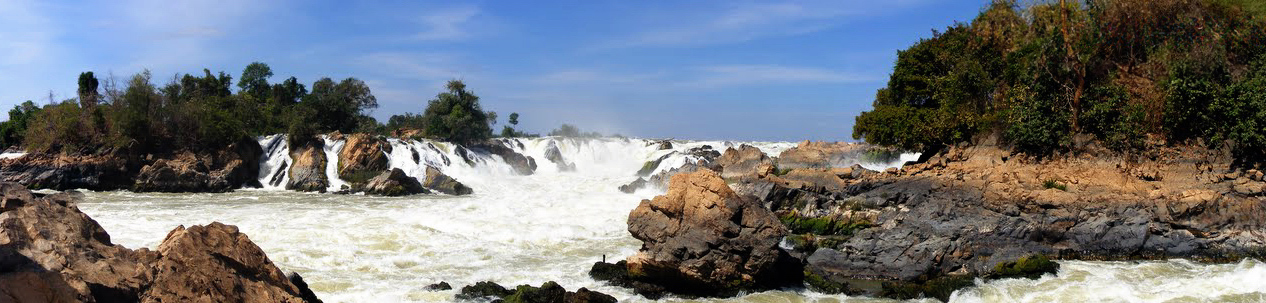
Khone Phapheng Falls

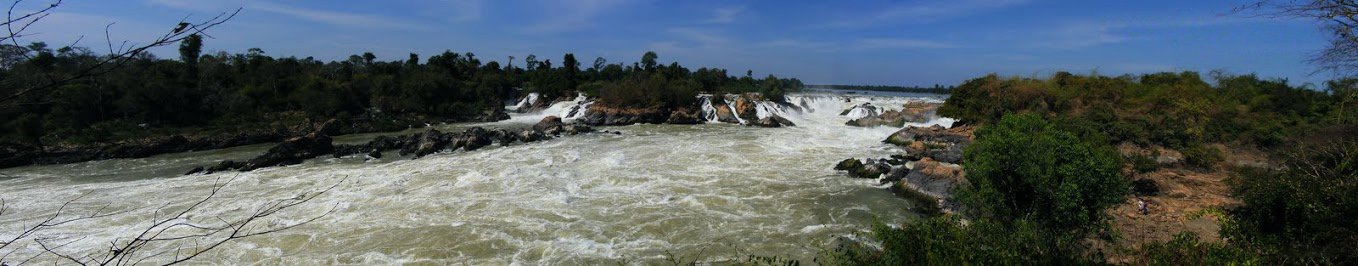
Khone Phapheng Falls

== Navigable efforts ==
Because the Khone Falls stop the Mekong river from carrying boat traffic to and from China, French colonialists in the late 19th century made repeated attempts to navigate the falls. Their efforts failed, which led to the construction of the Don Det–Don Khon railway on Don Det and Don Khon islands.

== Wildlife ==
Hemimyzon khonensis, a species of hillstream loach, is known from a single specimen collected in the Mekong at the Khone Falls. The falls are home to the plabuck, an endangered species of catfish said to be the largest freshwater fish in the world. The plabuck is alleged to reach lengths of 3 m (10 ft) and weights of up to 293 kilograms (646 lb).

== See also ==
- List of waterfalls
- List of waterfalls by flow rate
