= Si Phan Don =

Archipelago in the Mekong River, in Laos

Coordinates: 14°03′00″N 105°50′24″E

The Si Phan Don (Lao: ສີ່ພັນດອນ; meaning '4,000 islands') is a riverine archipelago in the Mekong River, Champasak Province in southern Laos. Si Phan Don is part of Khong District, including the islands and part of the mainland in the east. Si Phan Don is dotted with numerous islands, half of which are submerged when the Mekong River is in flood. The principal islands of Si Phan Don are Don Khong (the largest), Don Som (the second largest), Don Det and Don Khon. Si Phan Don borders Cambodia and historical and cultural ties link the people on both side of the border. Pakse is the closest of the bigger cities in Laos to the area.

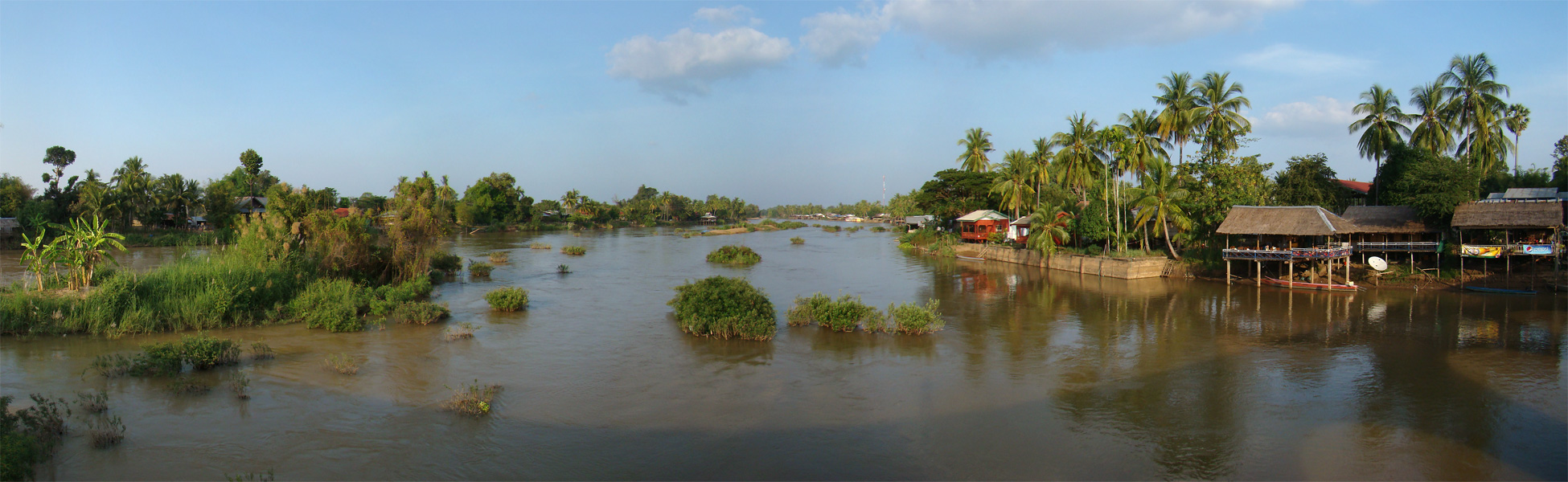
The Mekong River between Don Det and Don Khon

Key features of the Si Phan Don archipelago include:

- The remains of the first railway in Laos, the Don Det–Don Khon narrow gauge railway, built by the French to bypass the Khone Phapheng Falls and enable vessels, freight, and passengers to travel along the Mekong River.
- The Khone Phapheng Falls, a succession of impassable rapids that gave rise to the construction of the railway.

In the past, timber was logged on the islands, but it is now regulated; illegal logging incurs stiff penalties.

While the local economies are predominantly based on agriculture, the Si Phan Don archipelago has seen an increasing number of visitors. Tourism is concentrated on Don Khong, Don Det, Don Khon and small numbers on Don Som. Many of the other islands are rarely visited.

== Gallery ==
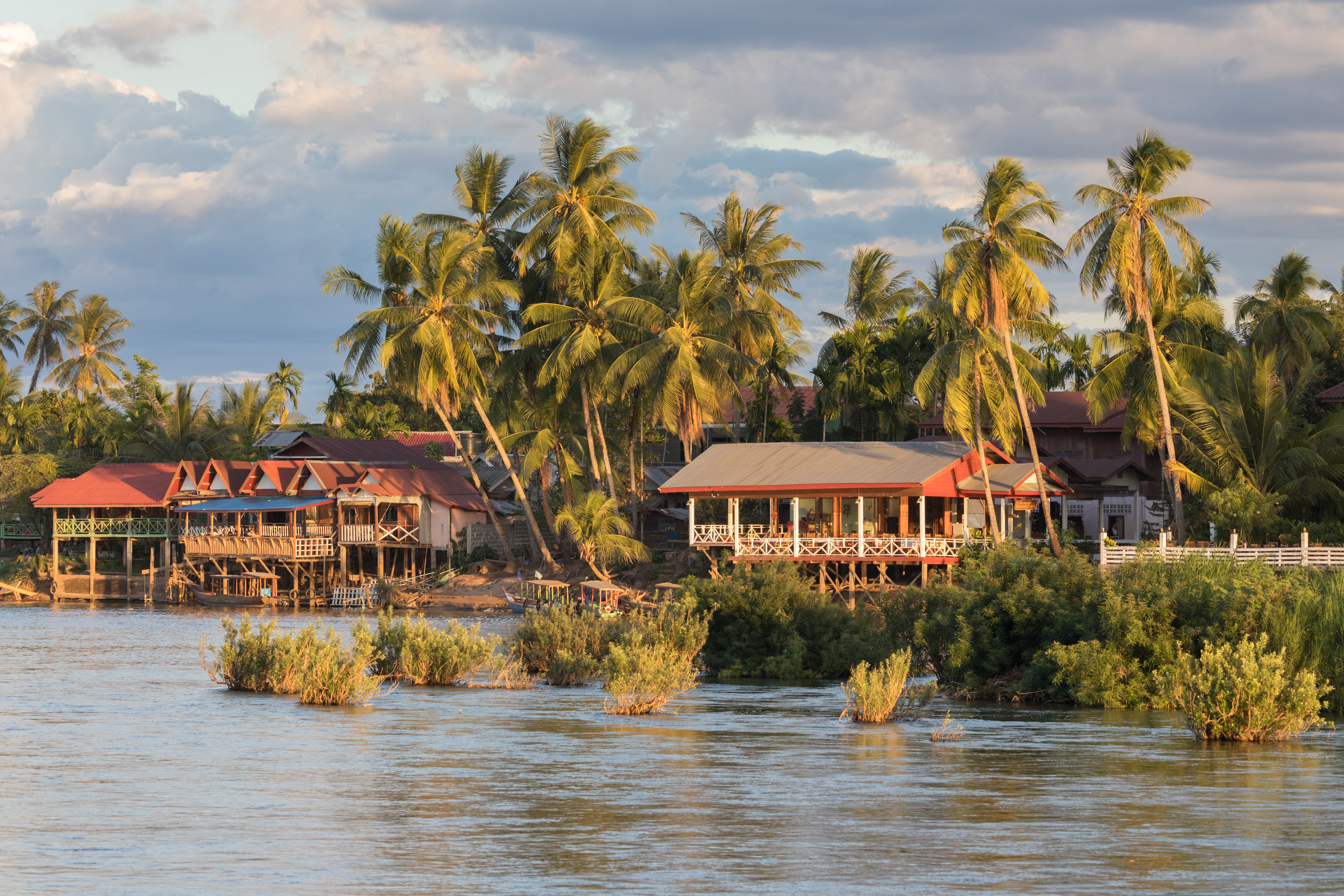
River bank of Don Khon with stilt wooden houses

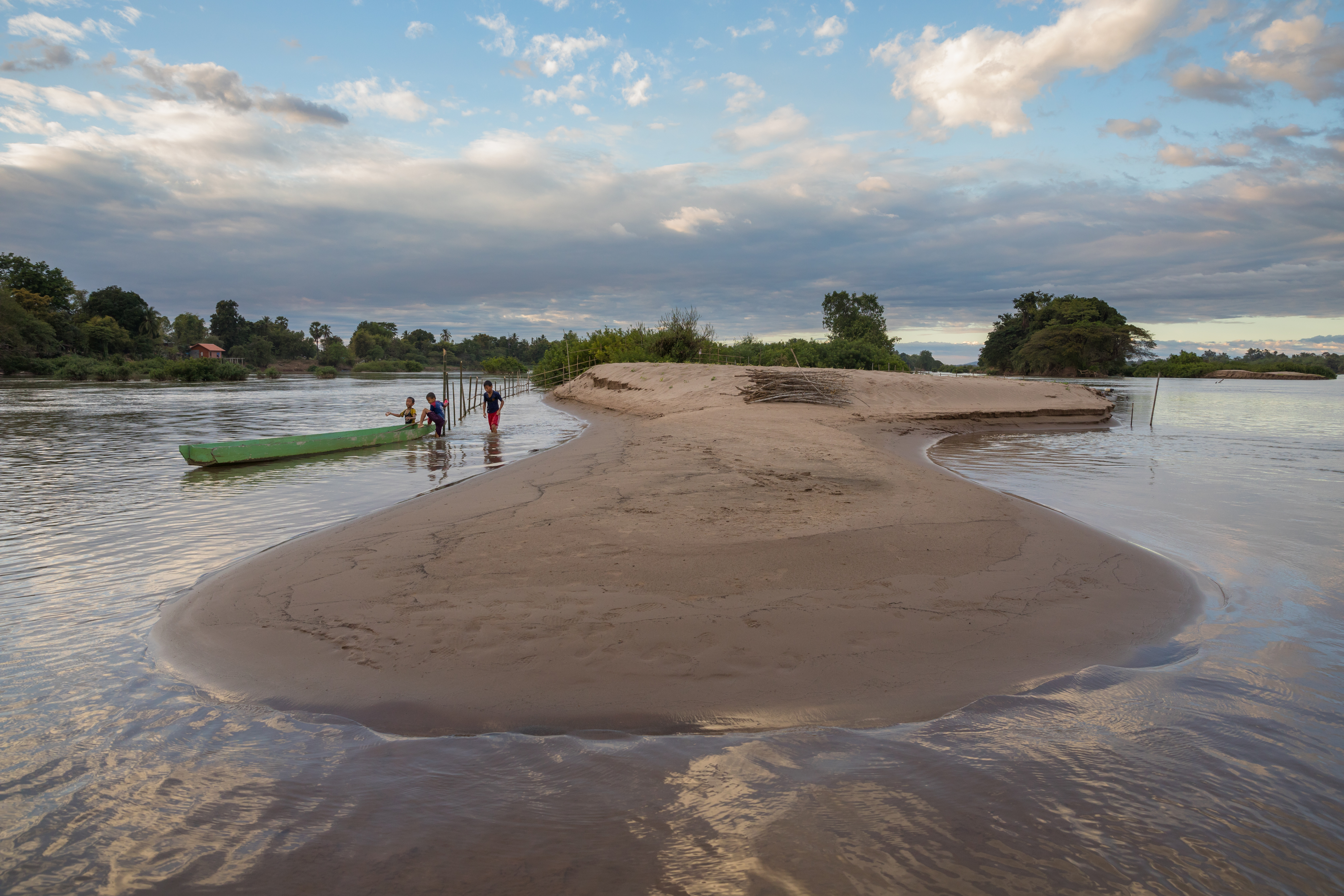
Mekong beach near Don Loppadi

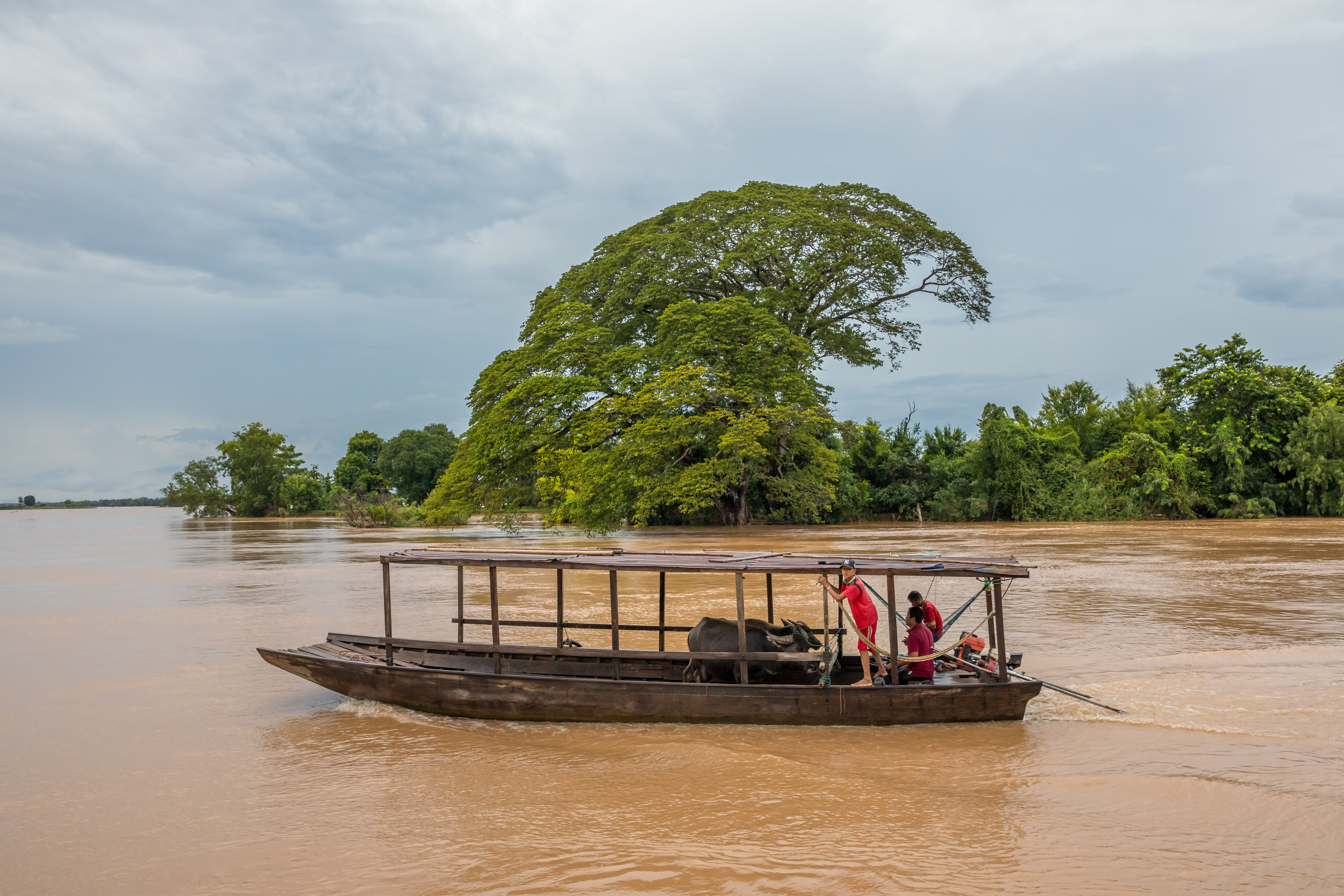
Transport of buffalos on the Mekong (from Don Det)

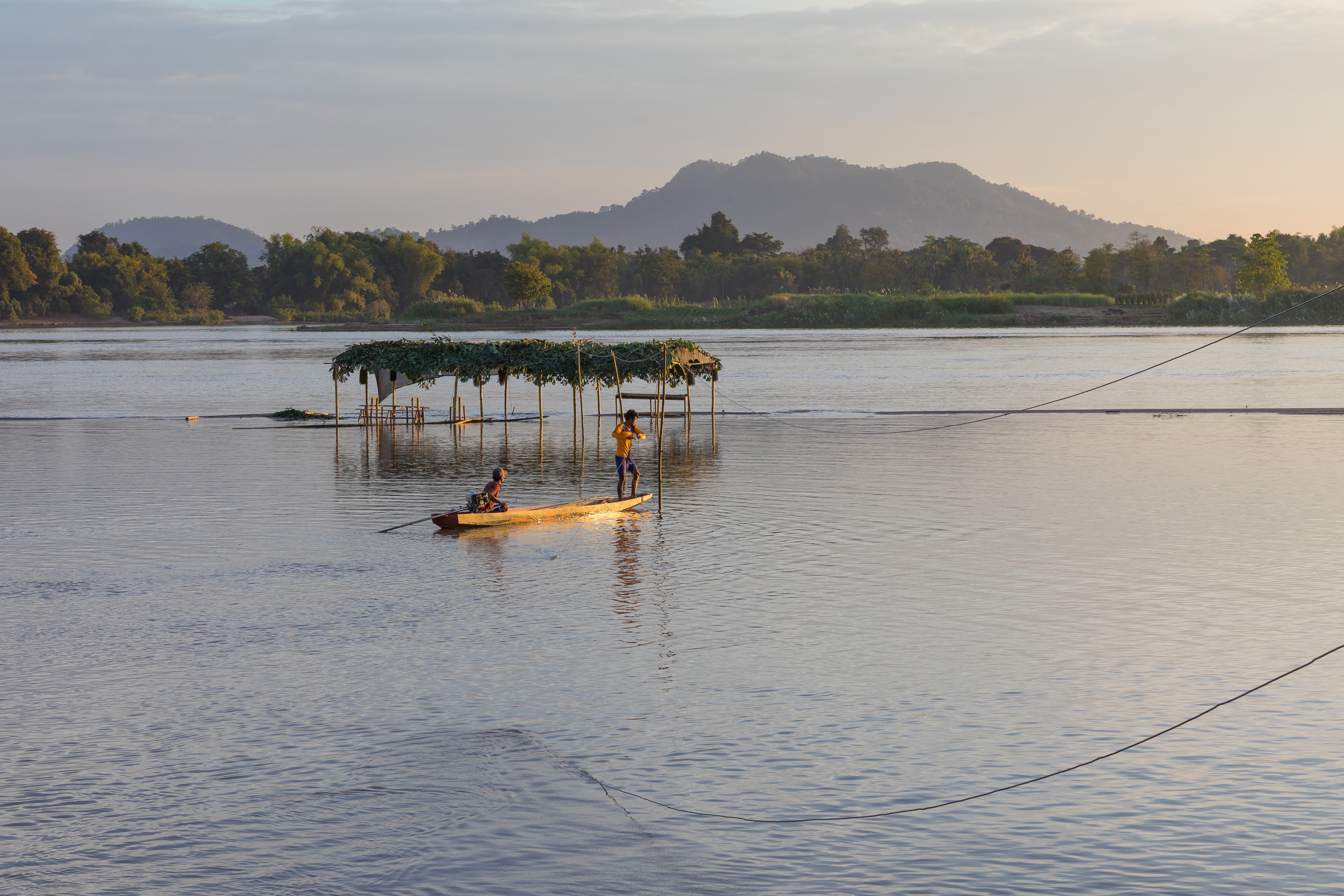
Mekong pirogue at sunset, Don Puay

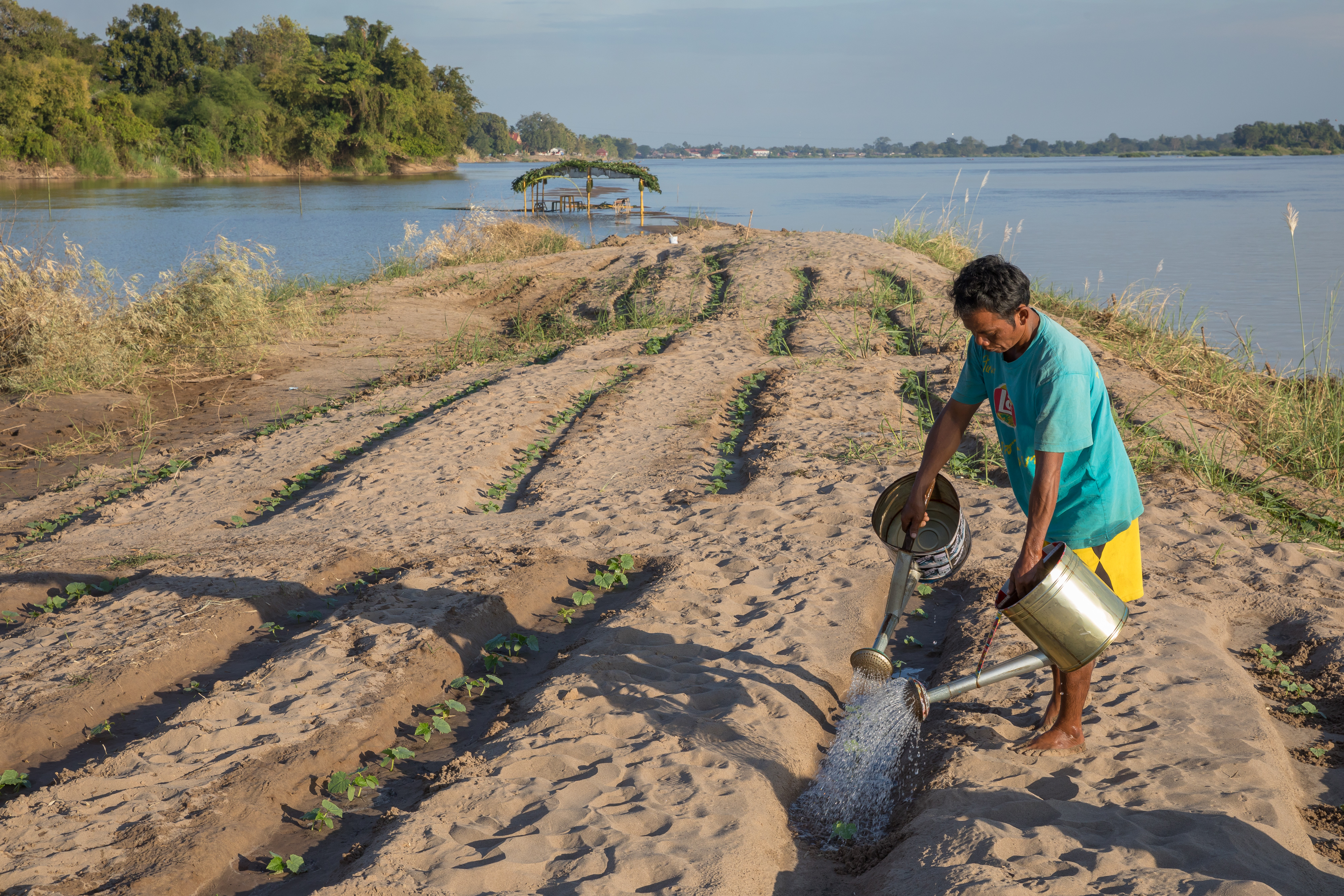
Man watering cucumbers on small island

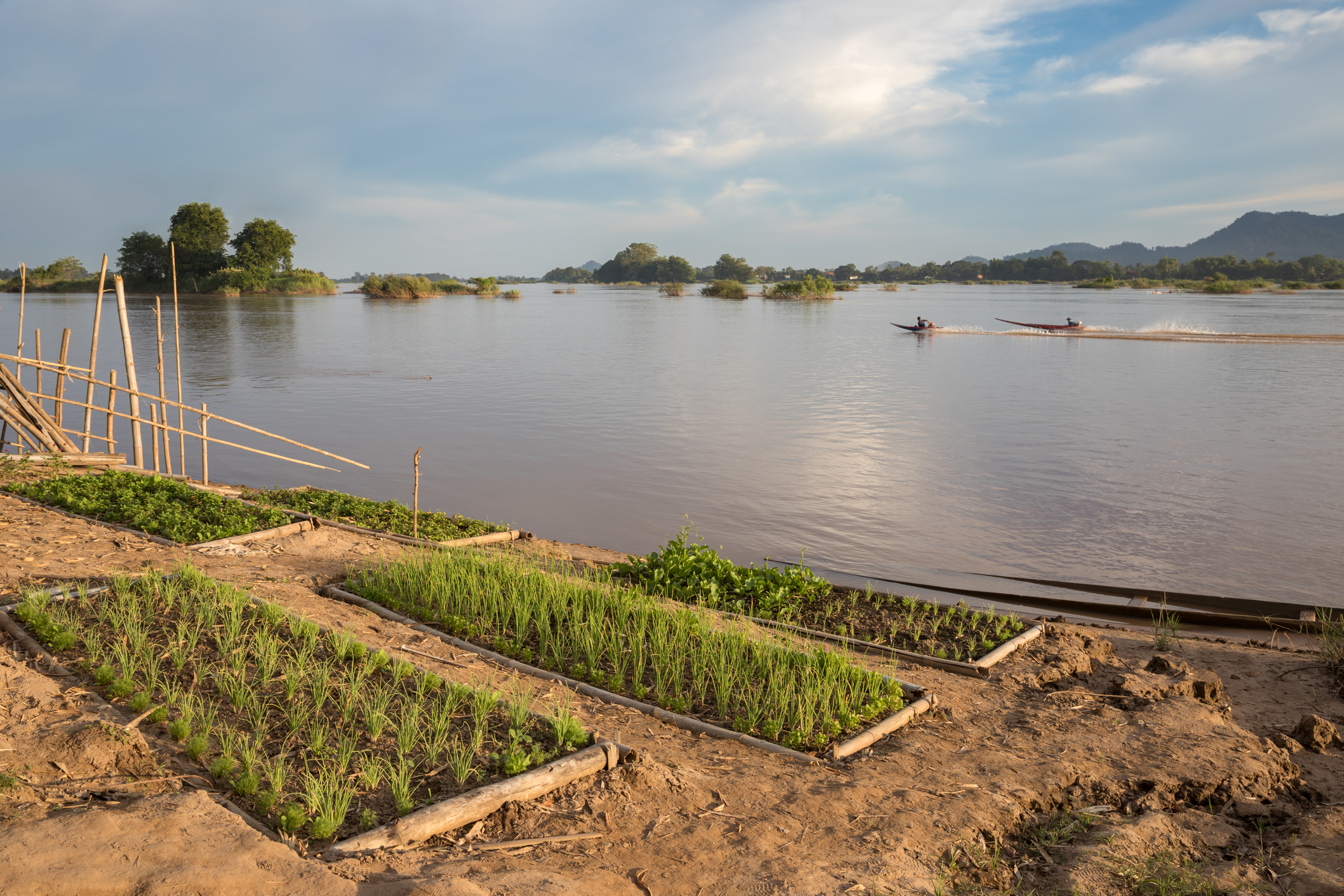
Kitchen garden on a Mekong bank, Don Loppadi

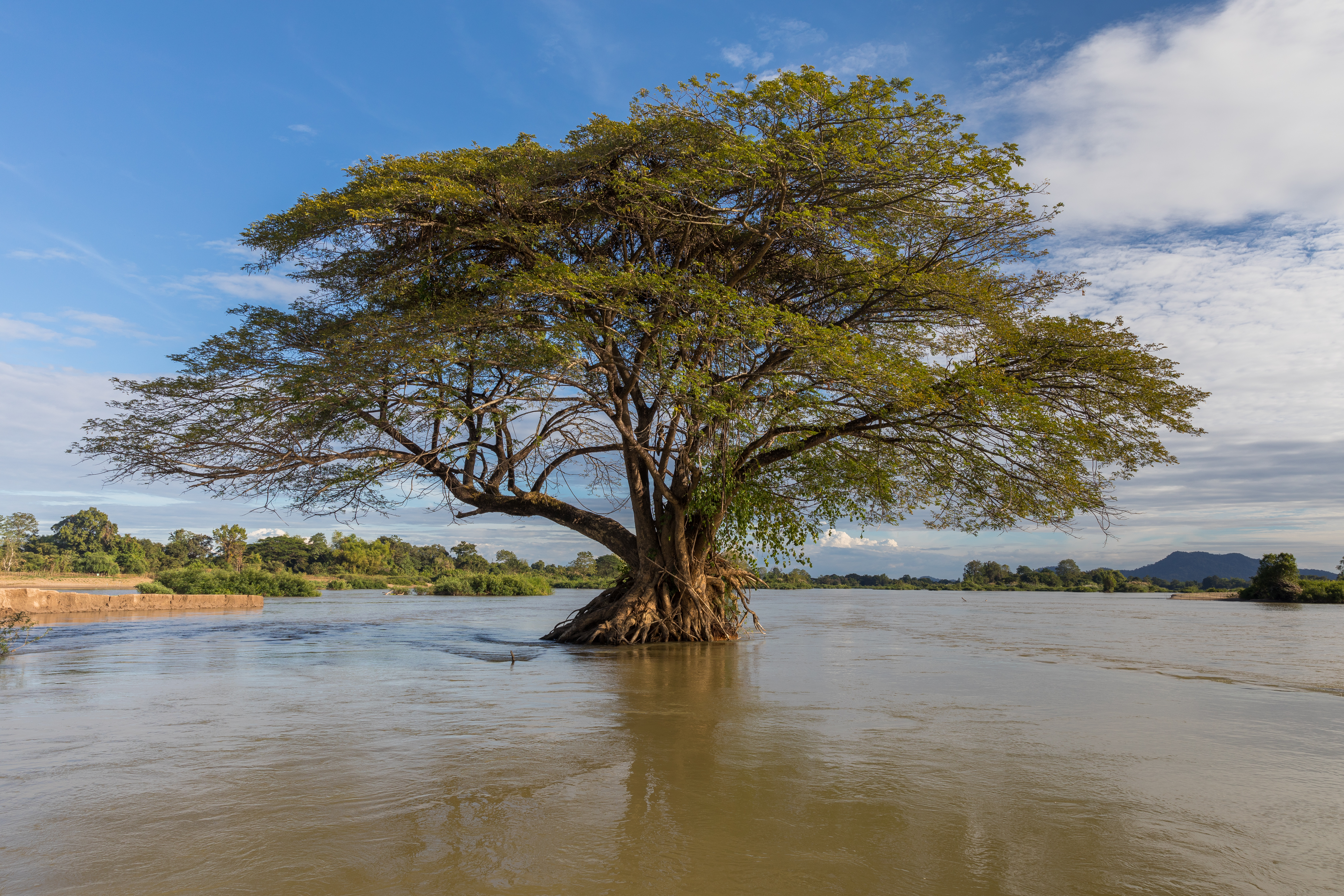
Flooded Albizia Saman (rain tree), Don Loppadi

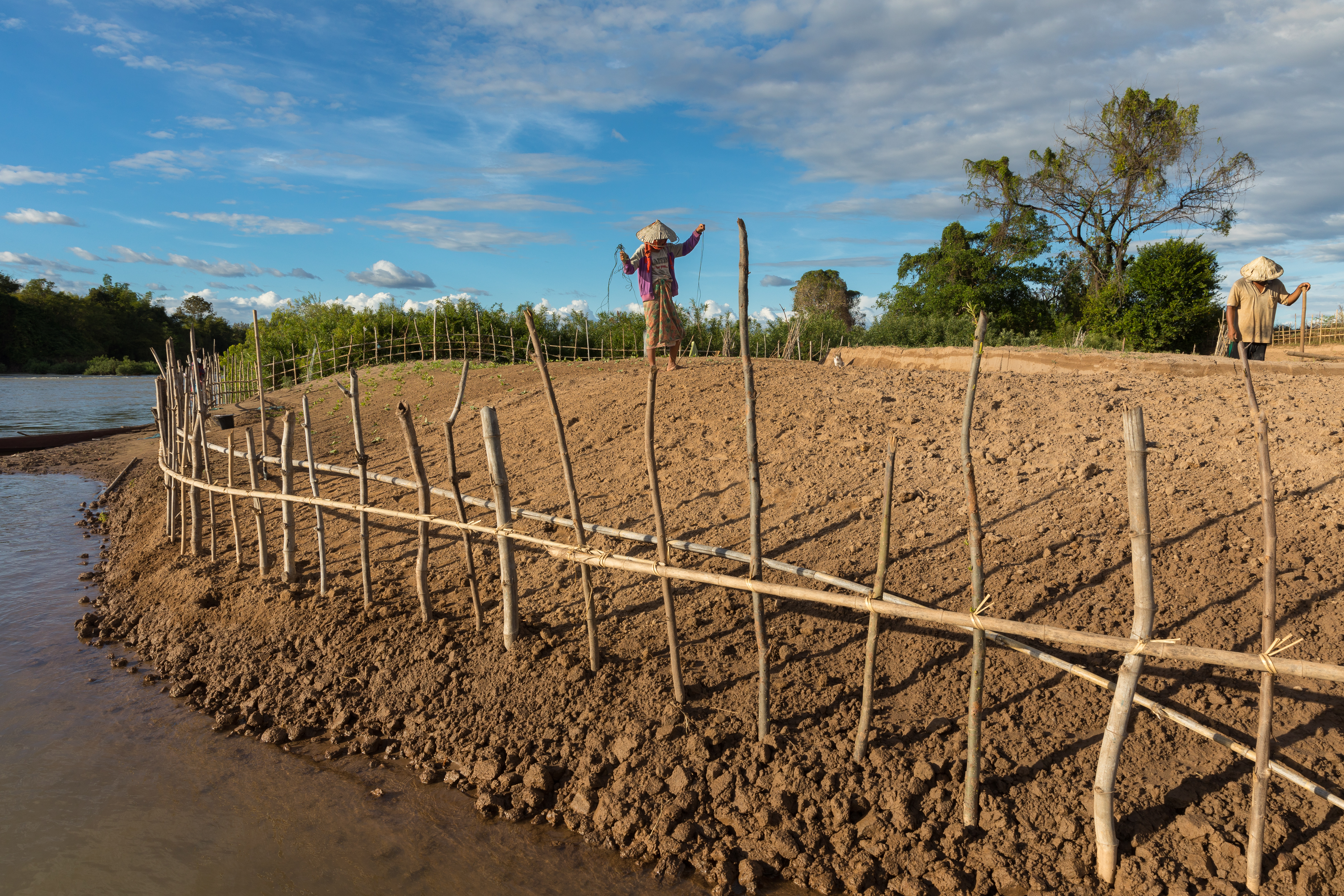
Wooden fence, Si Phan Don

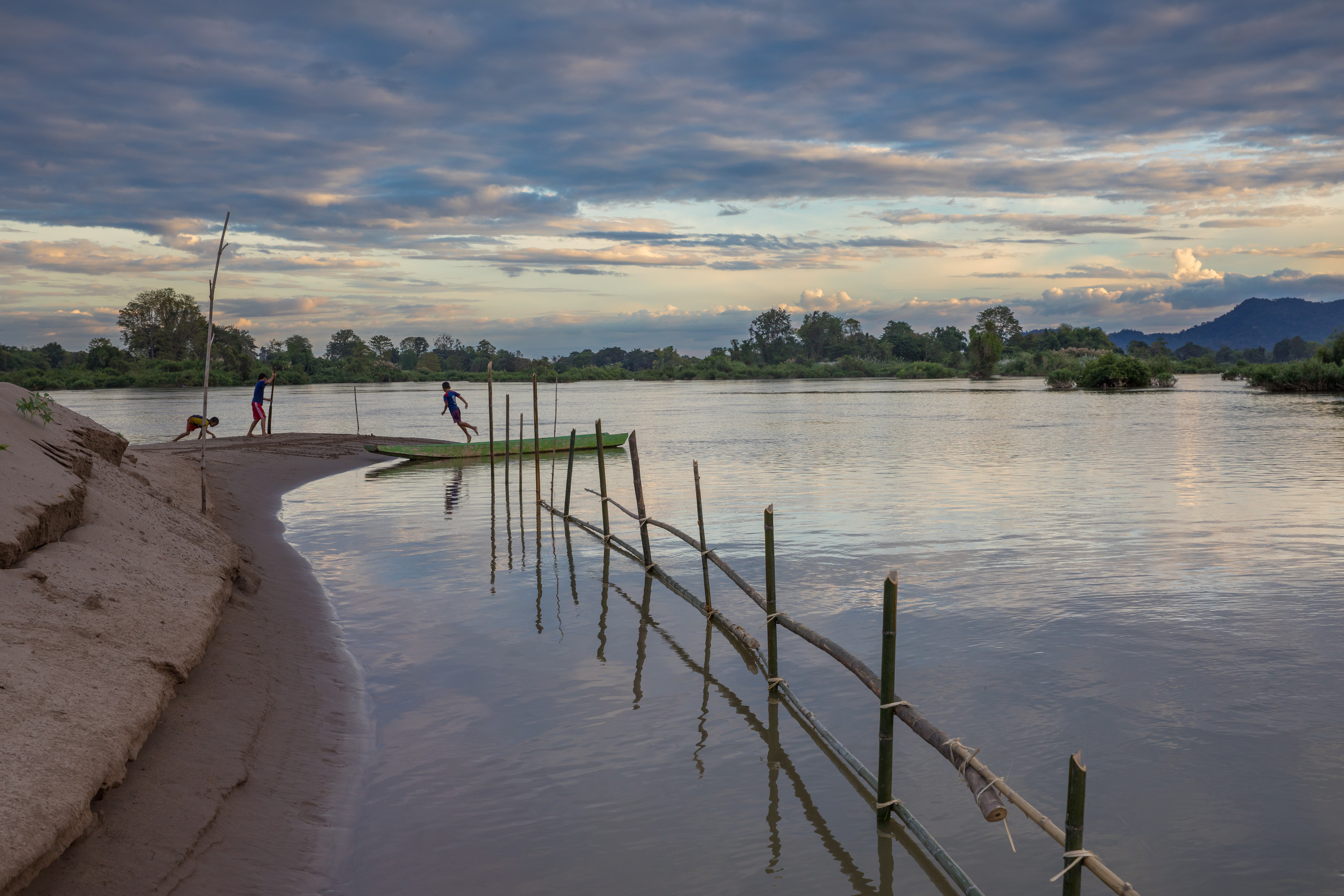
Children playing at sunset on a Mekong bank, Don Loppadi

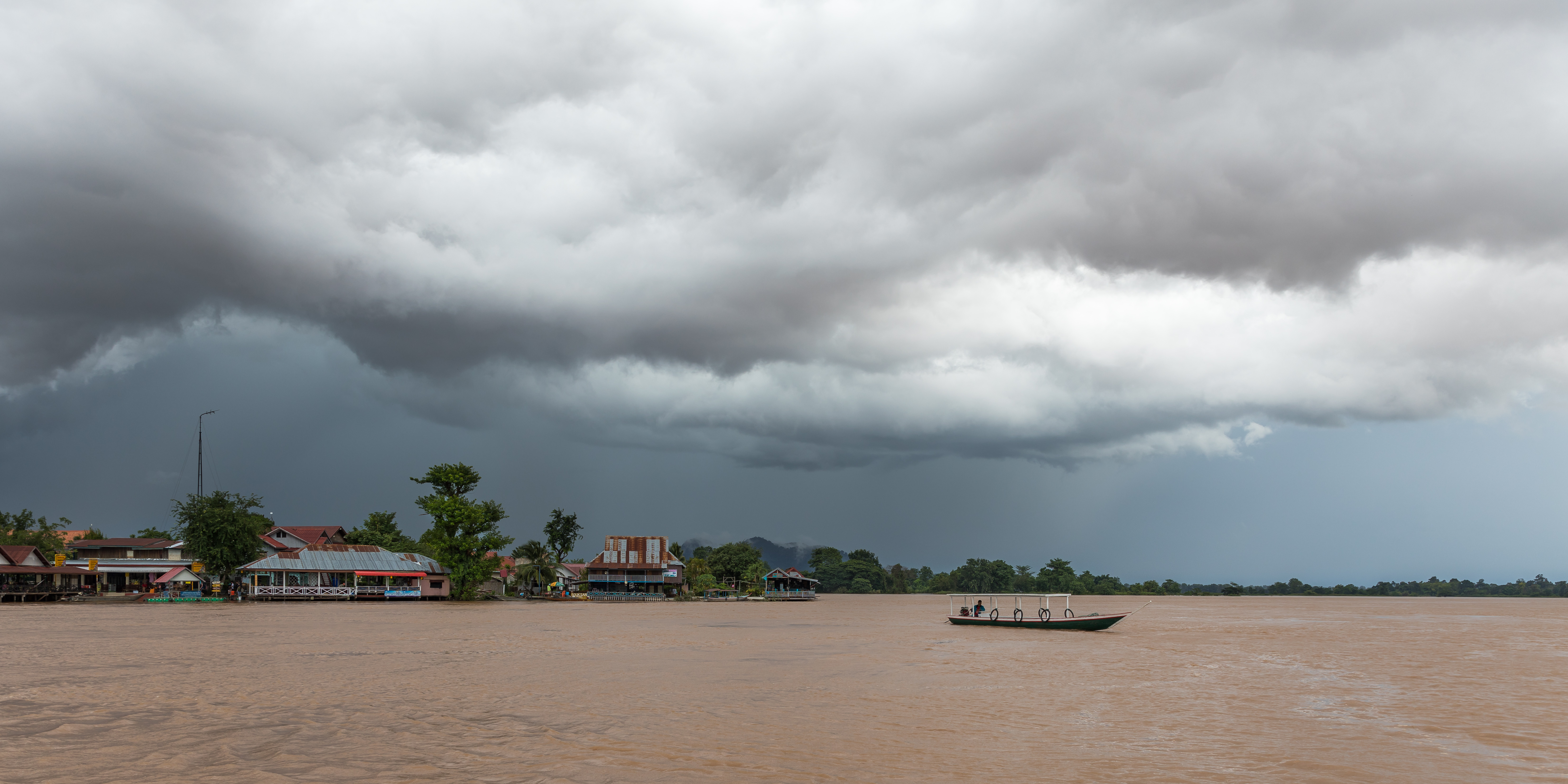
Pirogue on the Mekong under grey clouds before a storm

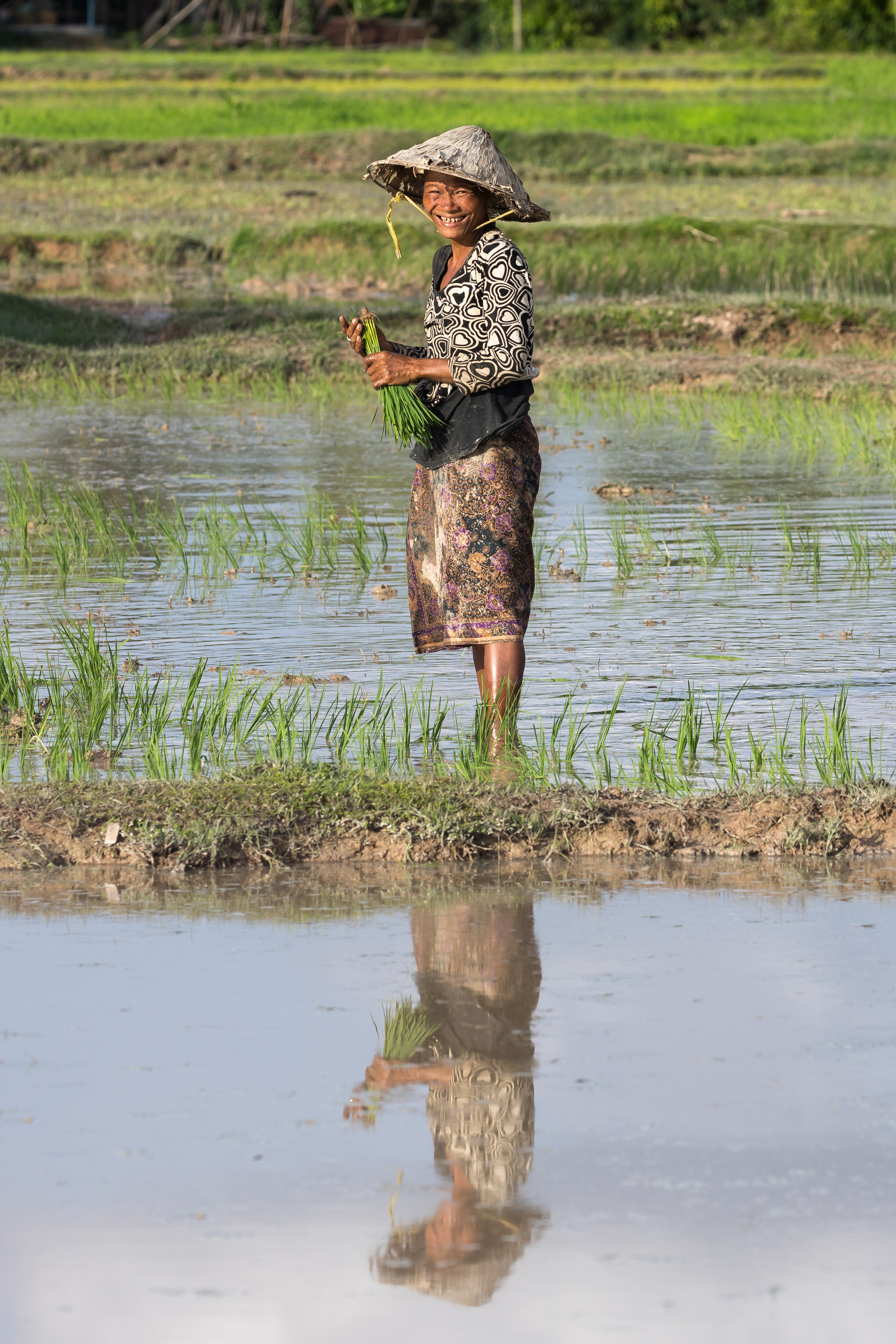
Water reflection of a smiling woman planting rice

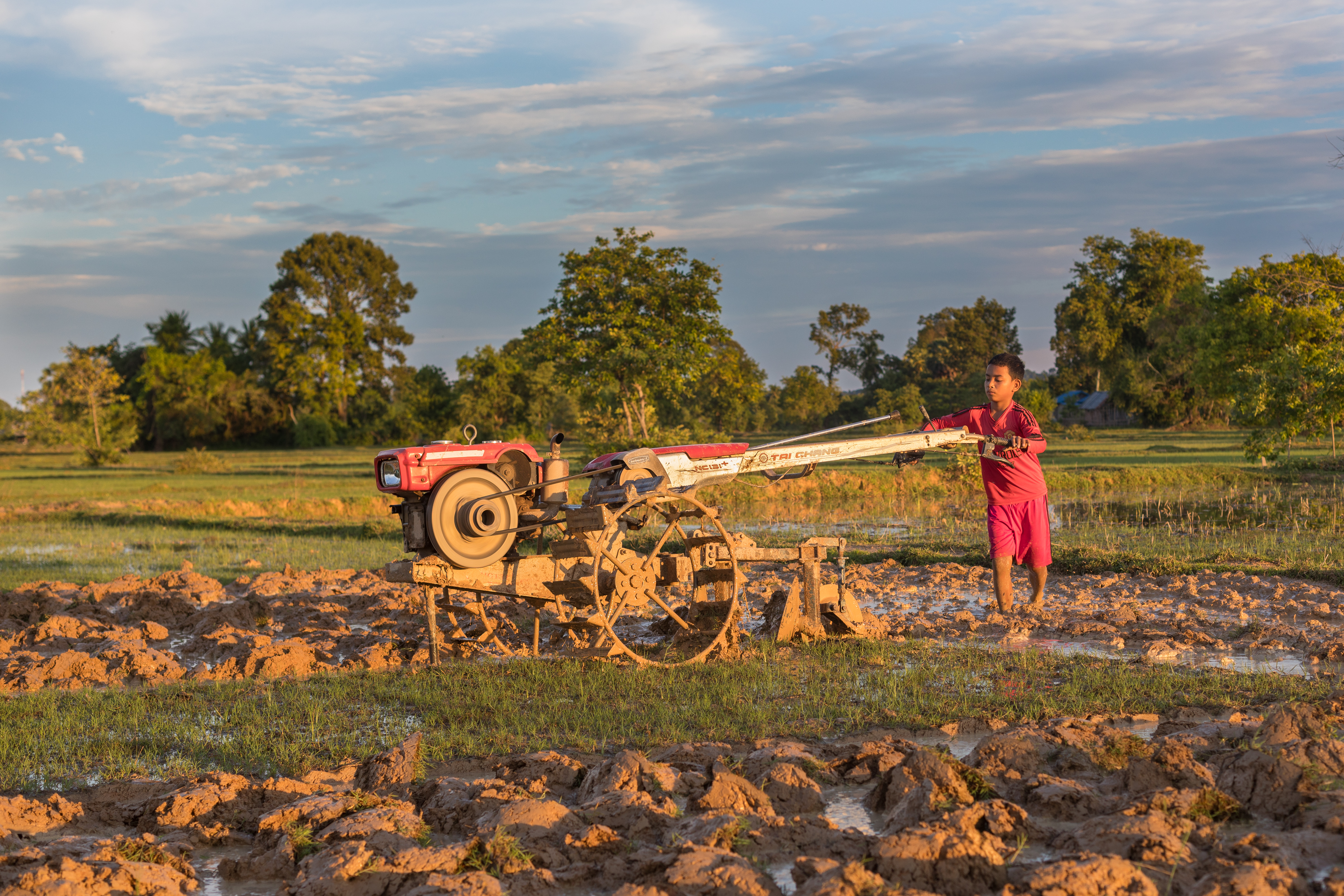
Boy plowing with a tractor at sunset in Don Det

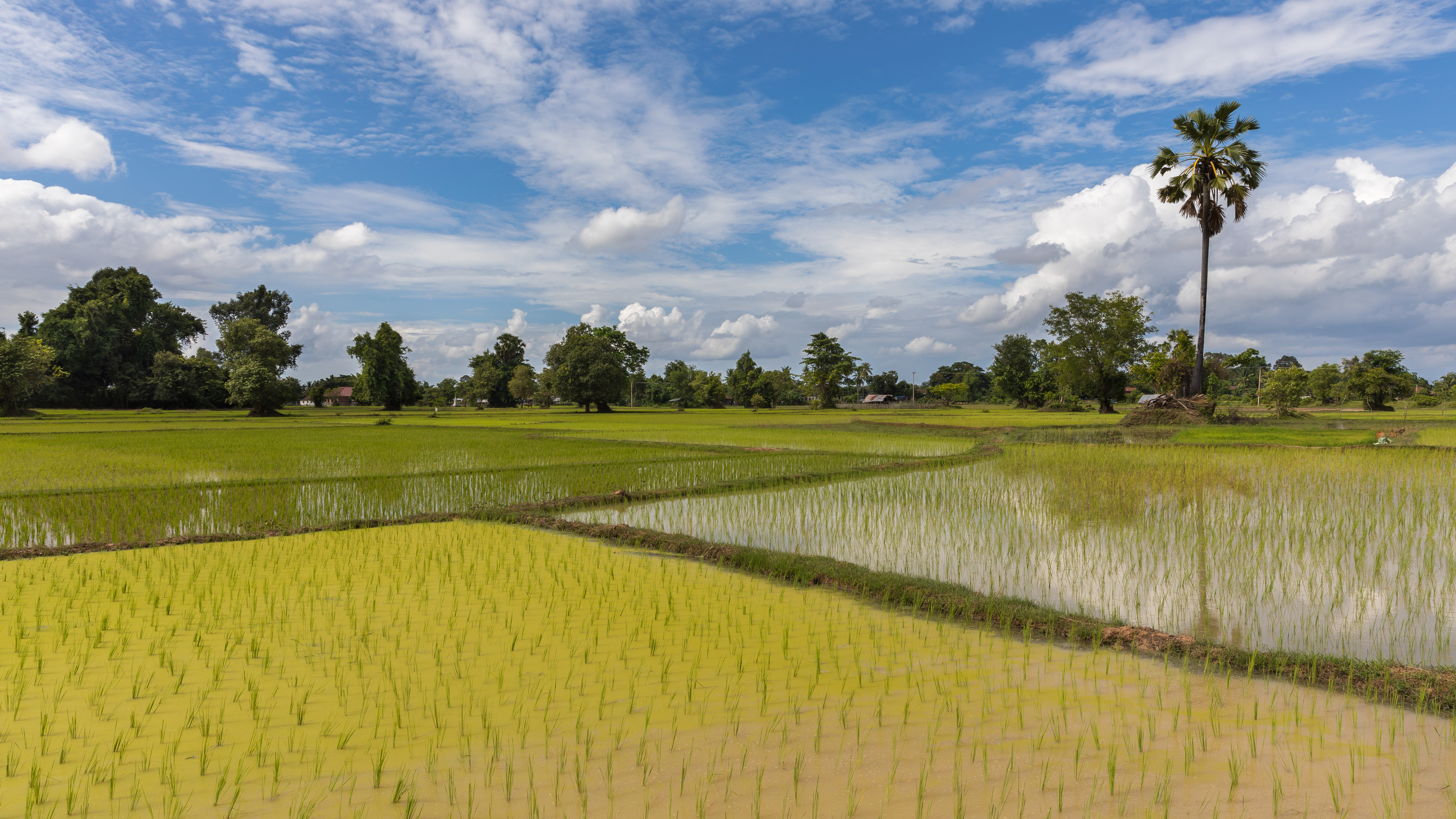
Opaque and mirroring green paddy fields with palm tree

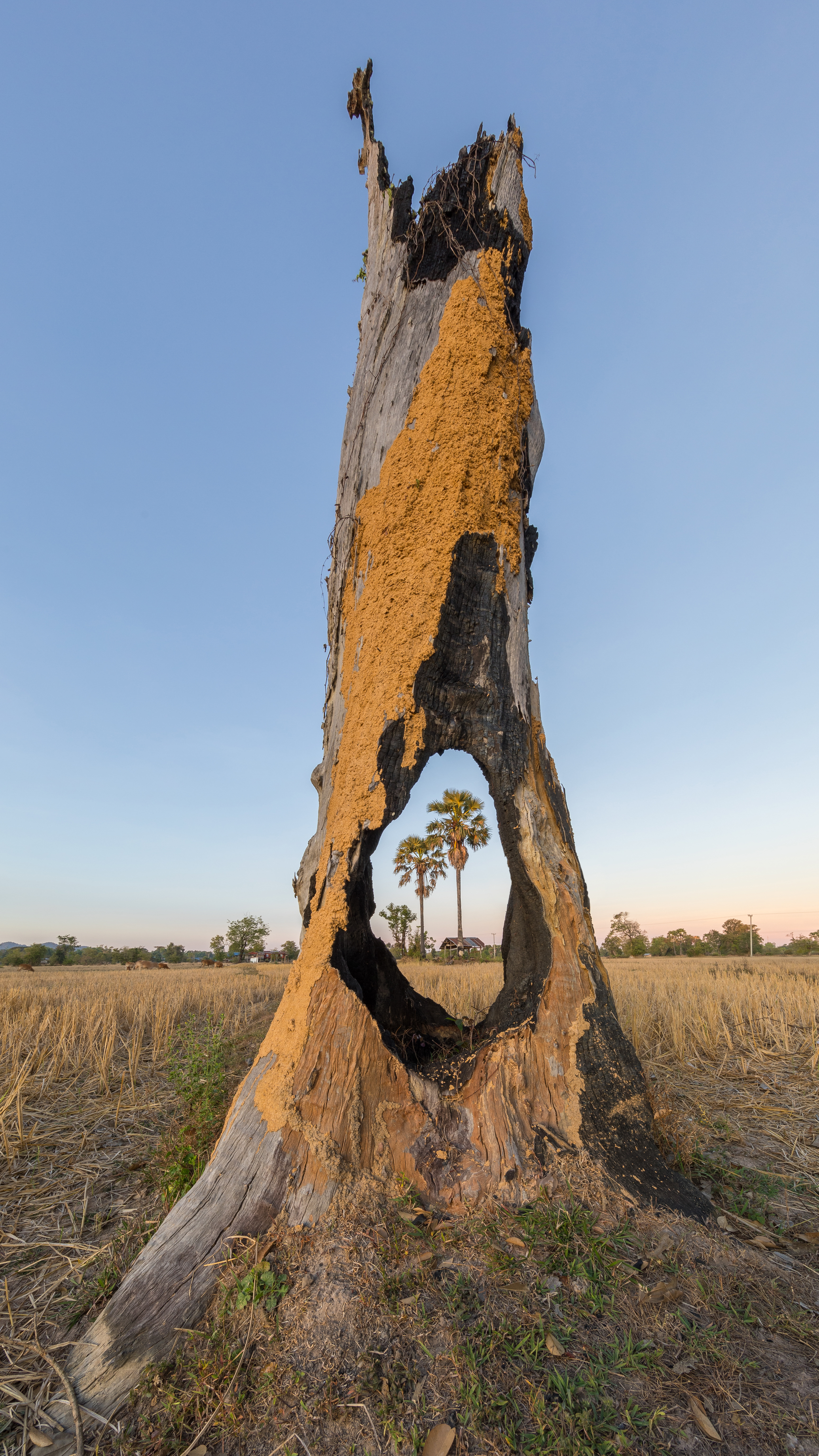
Two Arecaceae (palm trees) in the fields viewed through a hole in a tree stump damaged by fire on the island of Don Tao, at sunrise

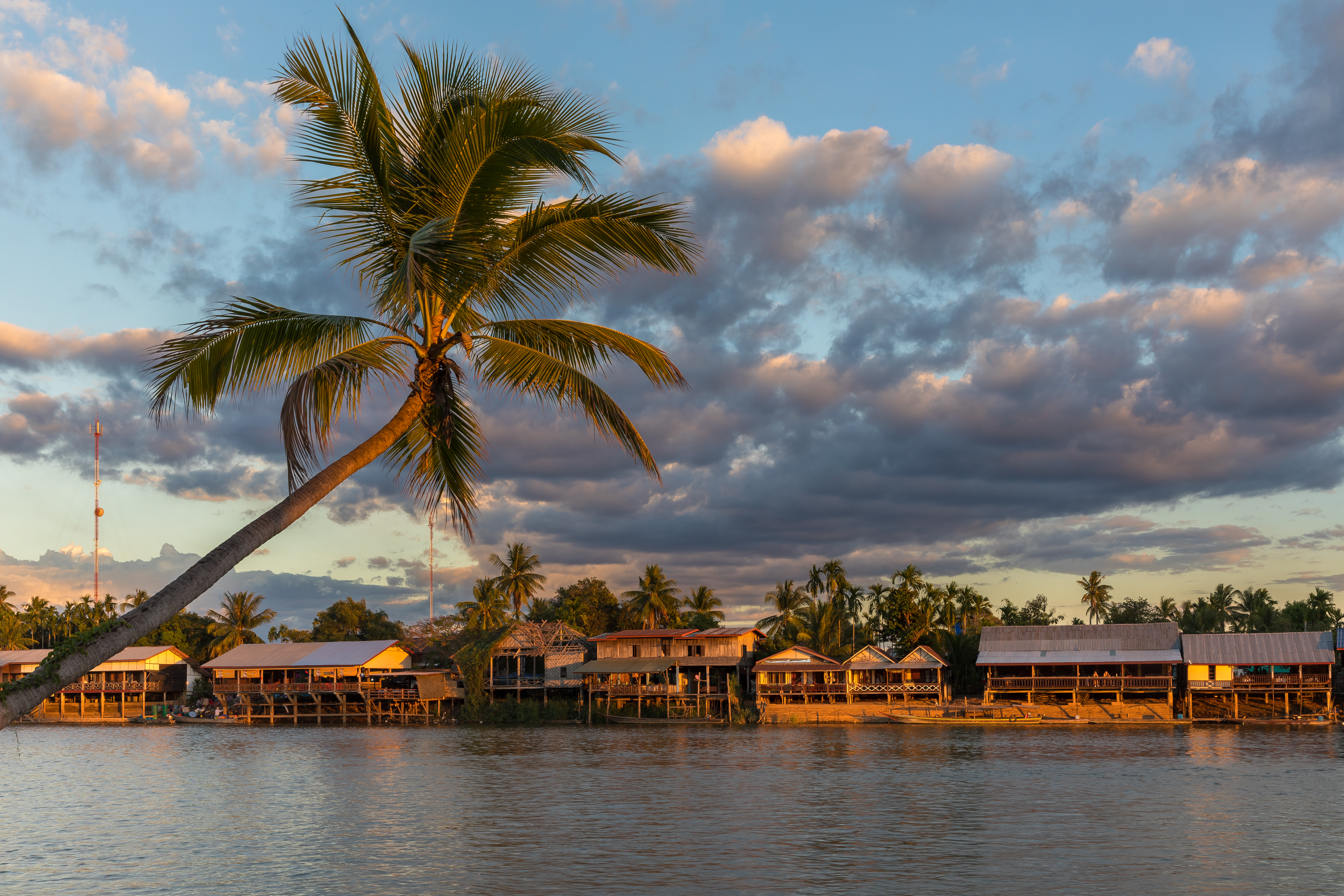
River bank of the island of Don Khon with stilt wooden houses, seen from Don Det with a leaning Arecaceae (palm tree) and colorful clouds
