= Khong Karam Alivand =

Khong Karam Alivand خنگ كرمعلي وند
- Village
- Location within Iran
- Coordinates: 31°55′56″N 49°50′47″E
- Country: Iran
- Province: Khuzestan
- County: Izeh
- Bakhsh: Central
- Rural District: Howmeh-ye Gharbi

Population (2006)
  - Total: 141
- Time zone: UTC+3:30 (IRST)
  - Summer (DST): UTC+4:30 (IRDT)

Khong Karam Alivand (Persian: خنگ كرمعلي وند, also Romanized as Khong Karam ‘Alīvand; also known as Karam ‘Alīvand and Khonak Karam ‘Alīvand) is a village in Howmeh-ye Gharbi Rural District, in the Central District of Izeh County, Khuzestan Province, Iran. At the 2006 census, its population was 141, in 26 families.
