= Khong Azhdar =

Khong Azhdar خنگ اژدر
- Village
- Location within Iran
- Coordinates: 31°55′57″N 49°51′36″E
- Country: Iran
- Province: Khuzestan
- County: Izeh
- Bakhsh: Central
- Rural District: Howmeh-ye Gharbi

Population (2006)
  - Total: 629
- Time zone: UTC+3:30 (IRST)
  - Summer (DST): UTC+4:30 (IRDT)

Khong Azhdar (Persian: خنگ اژدر; also known as Khong Ezhdehā) is a village in Howmeh-ye Gharbi Rural District, in the Central District of Izeh County, Khuzestan Province, Iran. At the 2006 census, its population was 629, in 120 families.
