= Khong Azhdar-e Ali Ayavel =

Khong Azhdar-e Ali Ayavel خنگ اژدرعلياي اول
- Village
- Country: Iran
- Province: Khuzestan
- County: Izeh
- Bakhsh: Central
- Rural District: Howmeh-ye Gharbi

Population (2006)
  - Total: 31
- Time zone: UTC+3:30 (IRST)
  - Summer (DST): UTC+4:30 (IRDT)

Khong Azhdar-e Ali Ayavel (Persian: خنگ اژدرعلياي اول, also Romanized as Khong Azhdar-e ʿAlī Āyāvel) is a village in Howmeh-ye Gharbi Rural District, in the Central District of Izeh County, Khuzestan Province, Iran. At the 2006 census, its population was 31, in 6 families.
