= Khong-e Bala =

Khong-e Bala خنگ بالا
- Village
- Location within Iran
- Coordinates: 32°44′13″N 59°19′55″E
- Country: Iran
- Province: South Khorasan
- County: Birjand
- Bakhsh: Central
- Rural District: Baqeran

Population (2006)
  - Total: 126
- Time zone: UTC+3:30 (IRST)
  - Summer (DST): UTC+4:30 (IRDT)

Khong-e Bala (Persian: خنگ بالا, also Romanized as Khong-e Bālā and Khūng-e Bālā; also known as Khong, Khung, Khūnīk, and Khurg) is a village in Baqeran Rural District, in the Central District of Birjand County, South Khorasan Province, Iran. At the 2006 census, its population was 126, in 52 families.
