= Khong-e Taheri =

Khong-e Taheri خنگ طاهري
- Village
- Location within Iran
- Coordinates: 30°18′04″N 51°25′54″E
- Country: Iran
- Province: Fars
- County: Rostam
- Bakhsh: Central
- Rural District: Rostam-e Do

Population (2006)
  - Total: 63
- Time zone: UTC+3:30 (IRST)
  - Summer (DST): UTC+4:30 (IRDT)

Khong-e Taheri (Persian: خنگ طاهري, also Romanized as Khong-e Ţāherī and Khong Ţāherī; also known as Khong) is a village in Rostam-e Do Rural District, in the Central District of Rostam County, Fars province, Iran. At the 2006 census, its population was 63, in 15 families.
