= Miangaran, Khuzestan =

Miangaran ميانگران
- Village
- Location within Iran
- Coordinates: 31°43′01″N 50°09′04″E
- Country: Iran
- Province: Khuzestan
- County: Izeh
- Bakhsh: Dehdez
- Rural District: Donbaleh Rud-e Shomali

Population (2006)
  - Total: 18
- Time zone: UTC+3:30 (IRST)
  - Summer (DST): UTC+4:30 (IRDT)

Miangaran (Persian: ميانگران, also Romanized as Mīāngarān) is a village in Donbaleh Rud-e Shomali Rural District, Dehdez District, Izeh County, Khuzestan Province, Iran. At the 2006 census, its population was 18, in 4 families.
