= Khonk-e Pir Sabz =

Khonk-e Pir Sabz خنك پيرسبز
- Village
- Location within Iran
- Coordinates: 30°17′27″N 51°27′25″E
- Country: Iran
- Province: Fars
- County: Rostam
- Bakhsh: Central
- Rural District: Rostam-e Yek

Population (2006)
  - Total: 157
- Time zone: UTC+3:30 (IRST)
  - Summer (DST): UTC+4:30 (IRDT)

Khonk-e Pir Sabz (Persian: خنك پيرسبز, also Romanized as Khonk-e Pīr Sabz; also known as Khong-e Pīr Sabz and Pīr Sabz) is a village in Rostam-e Yek Rural District, in the Central District of Rostam County, Fars province, Iran. At the 2006 census, its population was 157, in 27 families.
