= Khong Island =

Island in Laos

Coordinates: 14.14°N 105.83°E

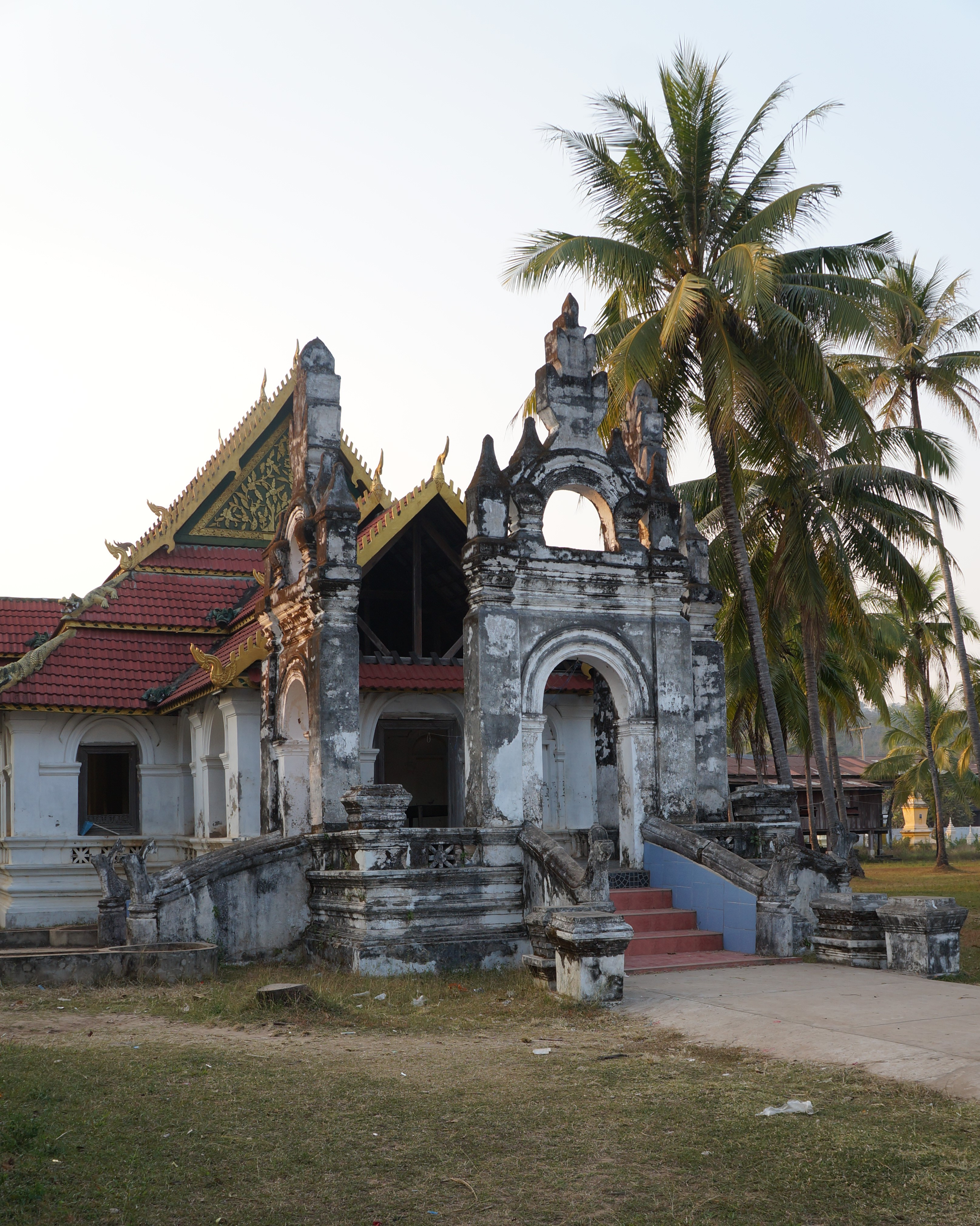
Temple Vat Chom Thong, Muang Khong, Don Khong. Si Phan Don, Khong Island, Laos.

Khong Island or Don Khong (Lao: ດອນໂຂງ) is the largest island and the seat of administration in the Si Phan Don riverine archipelago located in the Mekong River, Khong District, Champasak Province, southern Laos.

The island is 18 kilometers (11 mi) long (north-south), and 8 kilometers (5.0 mi) at its widest point. Its population is mainly concentrated in the two villages Muang Saen (west) and Muang Khong (east); the latter is the de facto capital of the island as well as the regional seat of government. There are 19 villages on the island and the main source of income comes from fishing.

The former President of Laos, Khamtai Siphandon, has a residence on the island, which is a possible explanation for the high quality of its infrastructure, such as asphalted roads and electricity. Locals tend to travel on longtail boats.
