= Don Khon =

Don Khon ດອນຄອນ
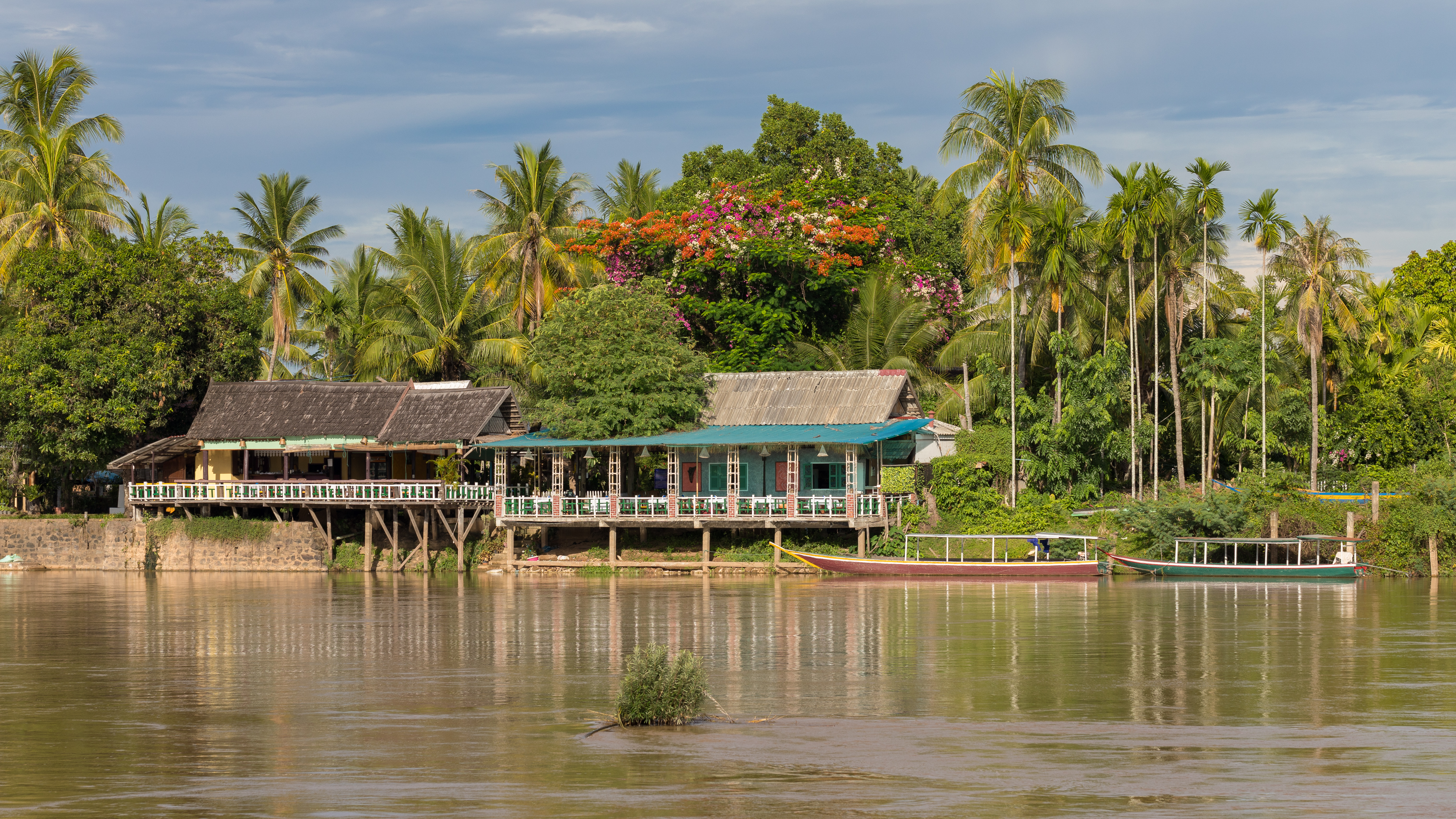
- Dwellings, Don Khon

- Location in Laos
- Coordinates: 13°57′19″N 105°55′34″E
- Country: Laos
- Province: Champasak

Population
  - Religions: Buddhism
- Time zone: UTC+7 (ICT)

Don Khon (Lao: ດອນຄອນ), is an island in the Mekong River in the Si Phan Don ("Four Thousand Islands") archipelago in Champasak Province of southern Laos.

== History ==
The Don Det–Don Khon railway was a 7-kilometer (4.3 mi)-long narrow-gauge portage railway on the islands of Don Khon and Don Det, opened in 1893 to transport vessels, freight, and passengers along the Mekong River, and closed since the 1940s.

== Geography ==
The walking path around the island is 13 km (8.08 mi). Don Khon is linked to its twin island Don Det by a bridge (Don Det–Don Khon railway).

There are two Buddhist temples, a primary school and a college on the island.

== Climate ==
Don Khon features a tropical wet and dry climate. While the city is generally very warm throughout the year, it is noticeably cooler during December and January. Don Khon also experiences wet and dry seasons, with the wet season from April until October, and the dry season during the remaining five months. Temperatures range from 15 °C to 38 °C.

== Gallery ==
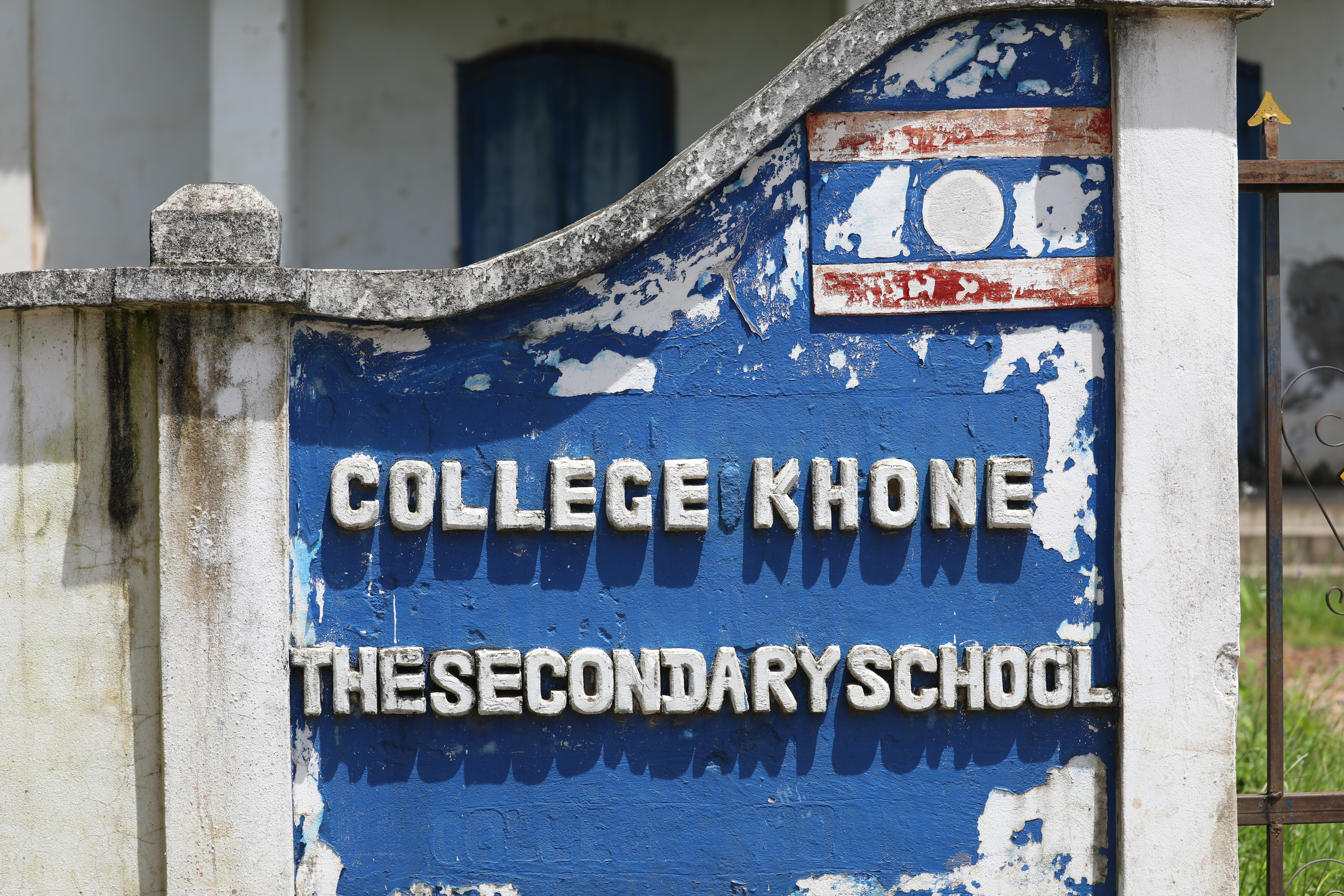
"College Khone, The secondary school", text written in raised letters.

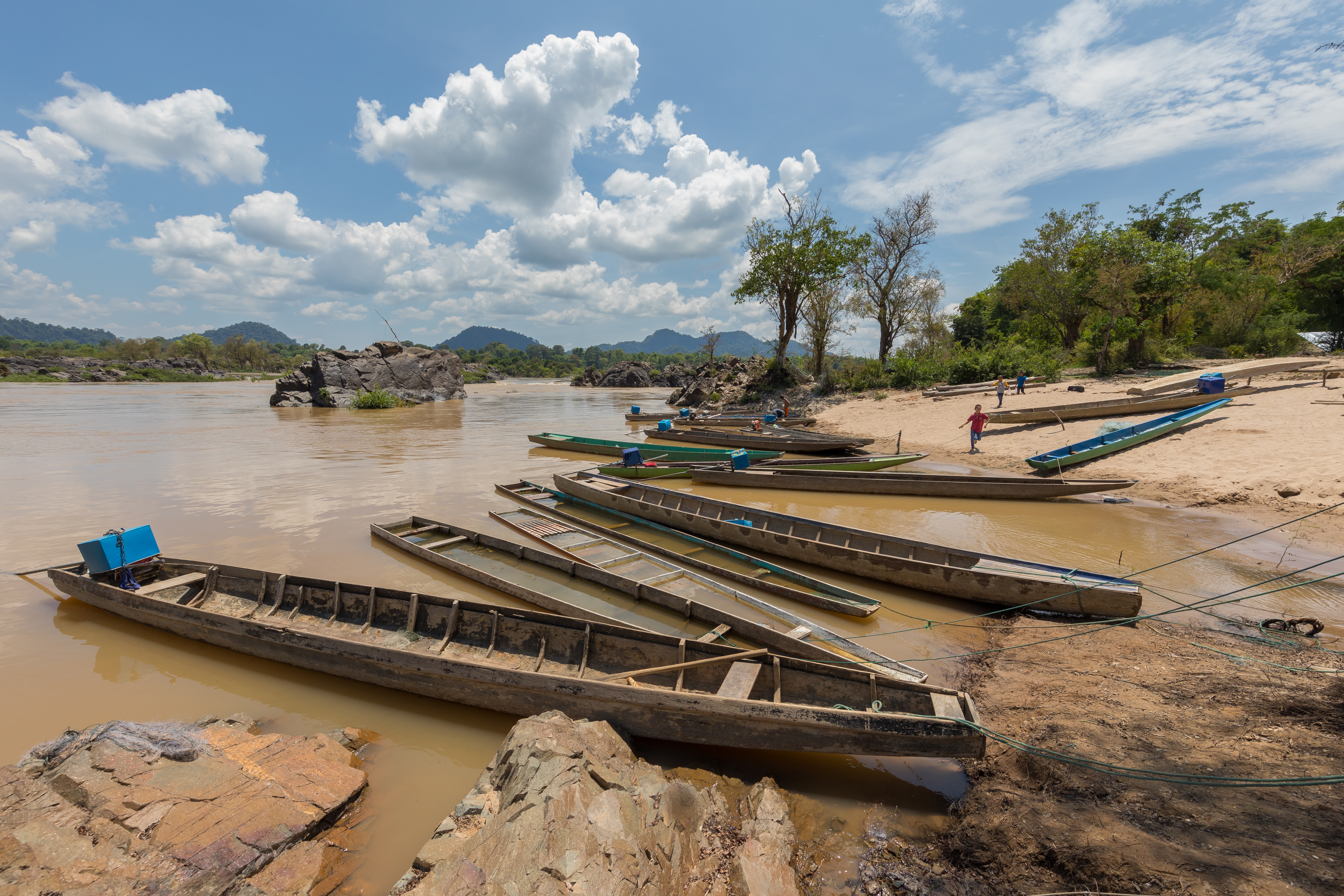
Beach of Don Khon, a sunny day with children running on the river bank, where several pirogues are attached.

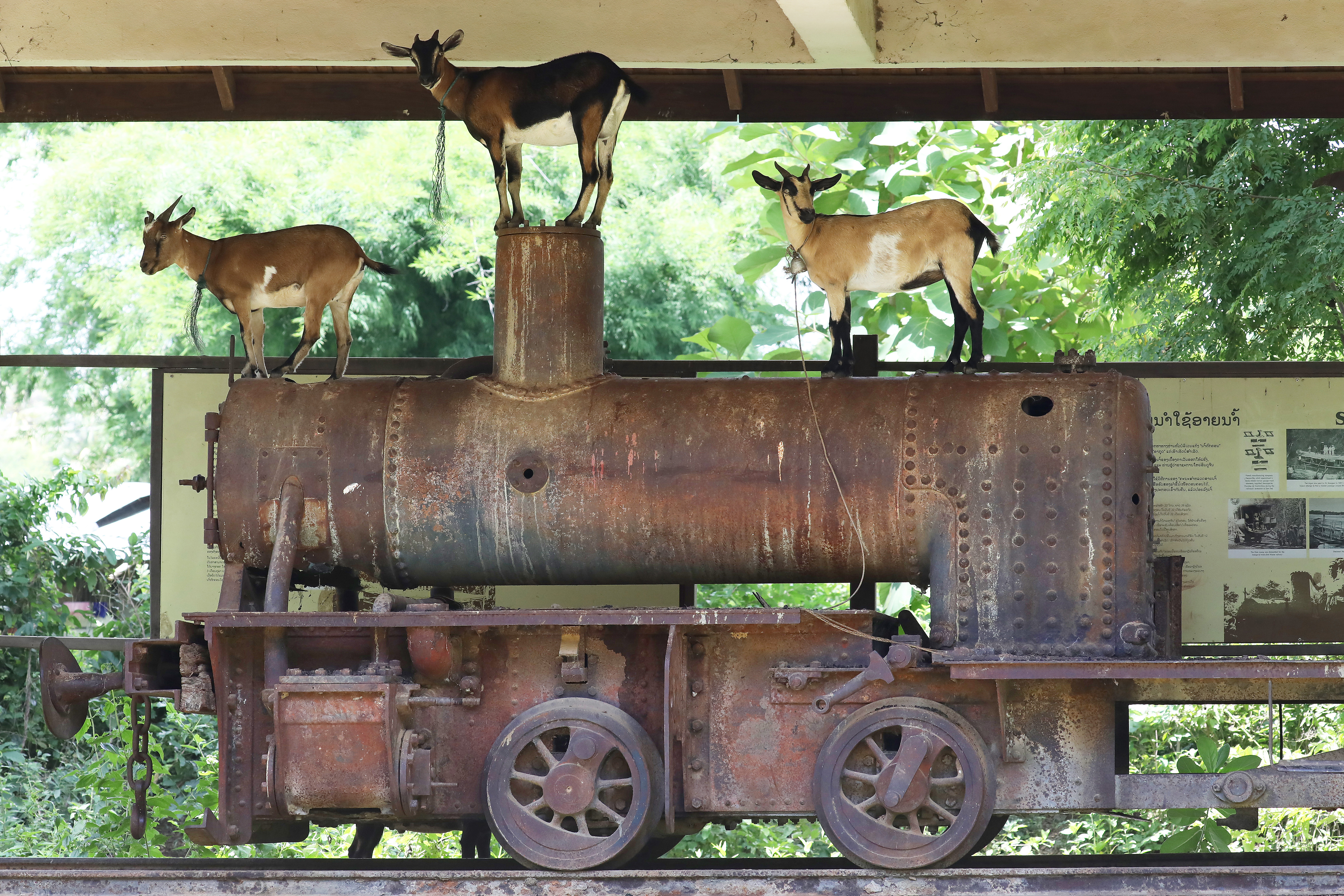
Historic locomotive hosting goats in Don Khon.

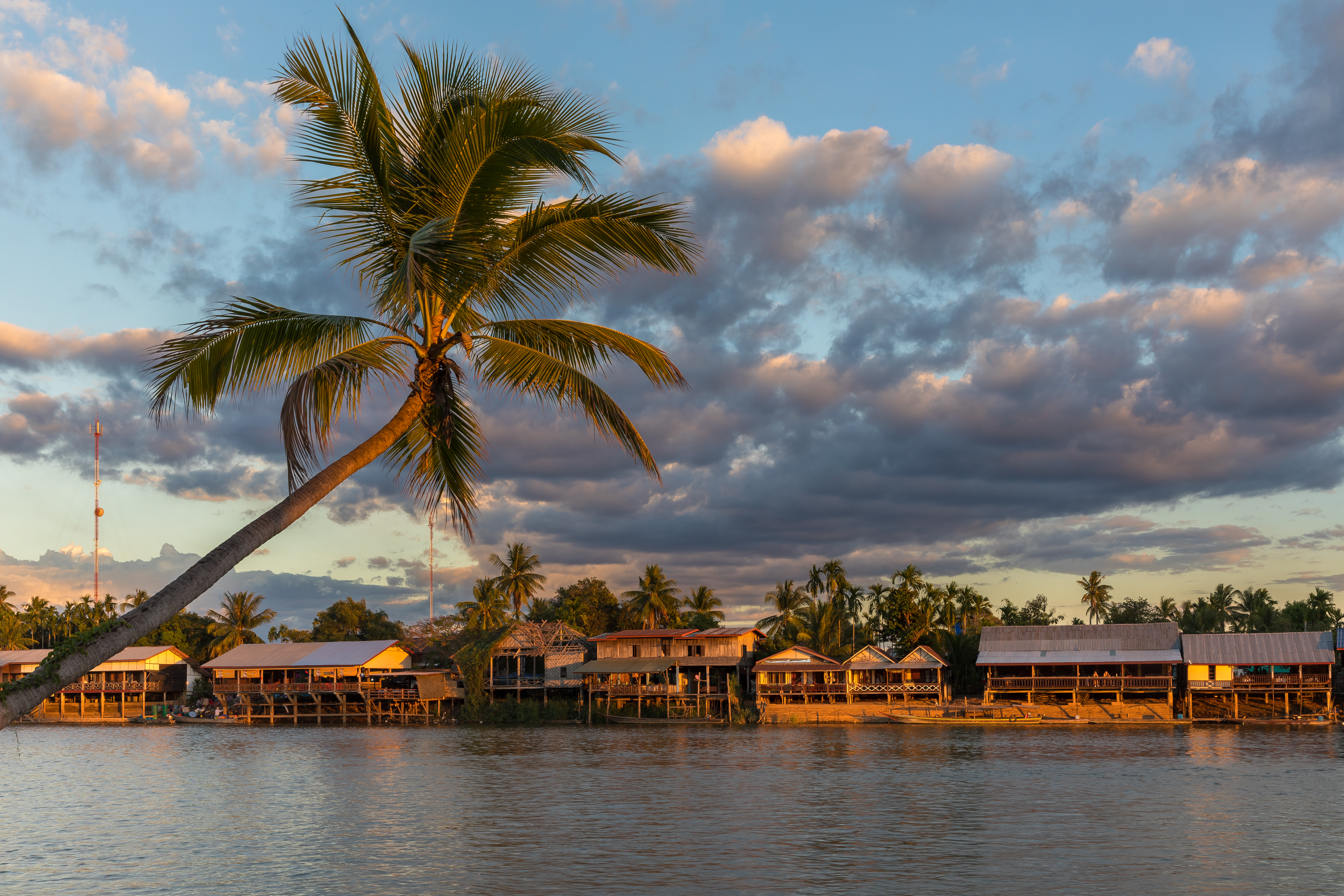
River bank of the island of Don Khon, with stilt wooden houses, in sunshine at golden hour, seen from Don Det with a leaning Arecaceae (palm tree) and colorful clouds.

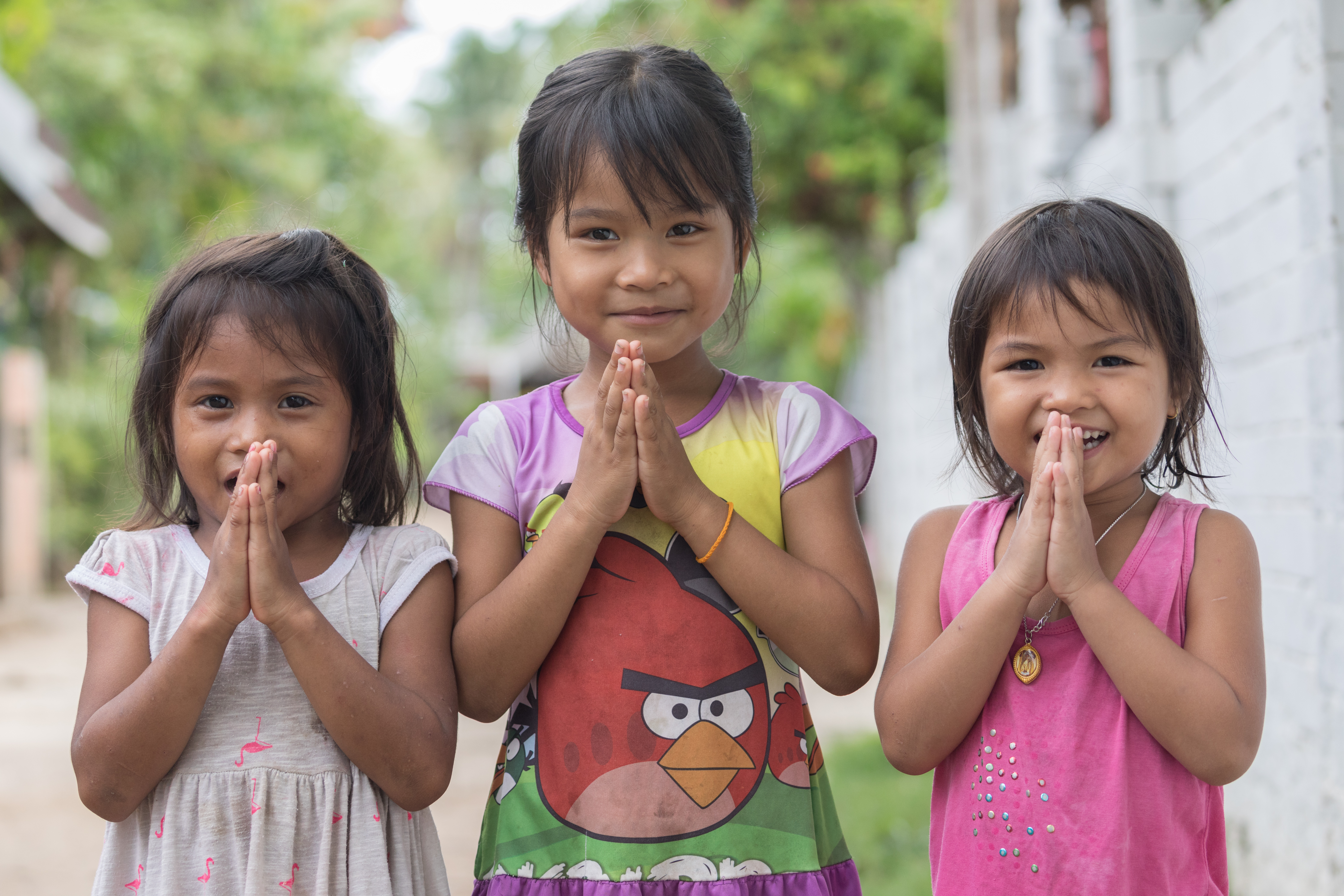
Group portrait photograph at bust length of three Lao girls joining their palms for the Thai greeting (Namaste).

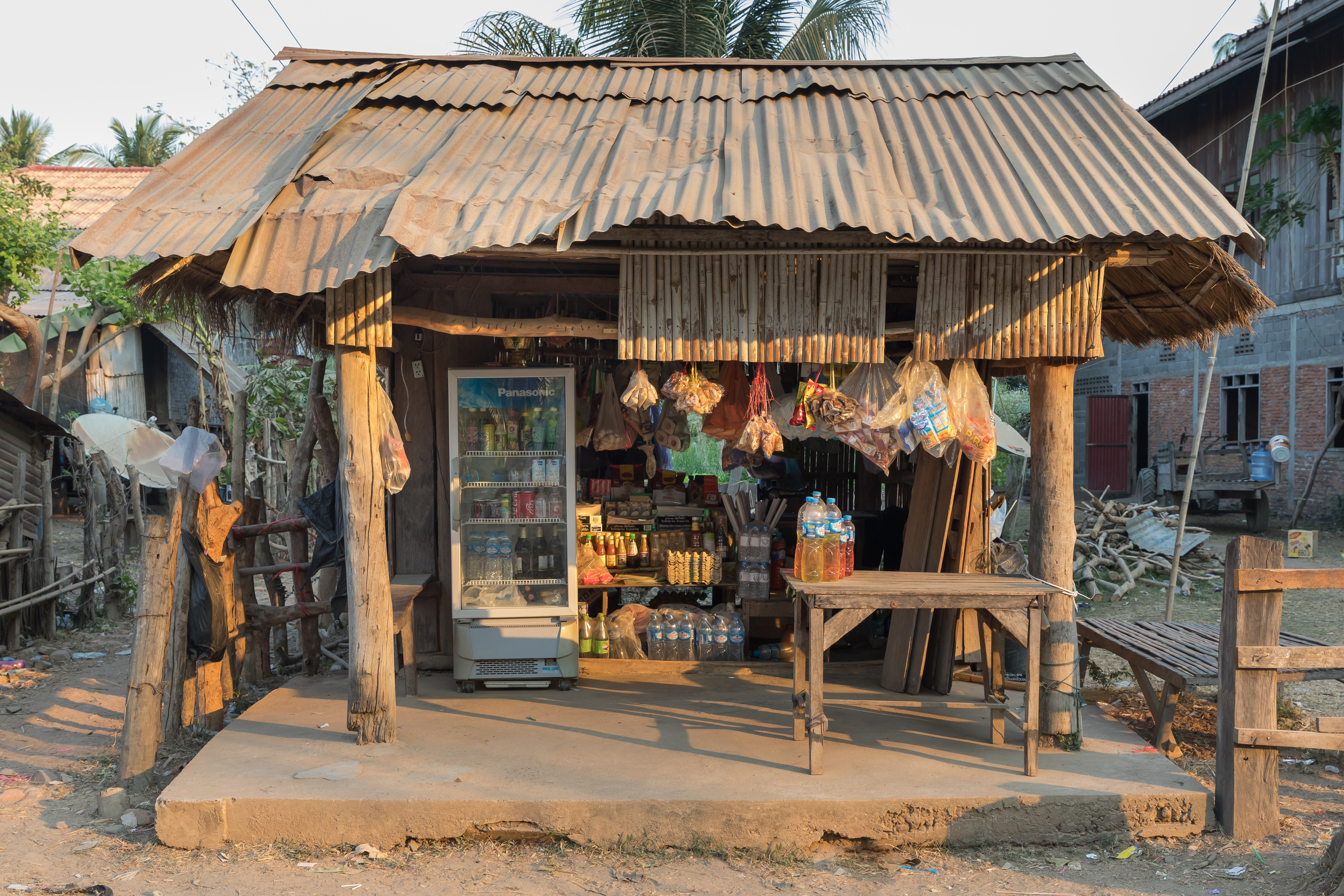
Old little shop with corrugated iron roof, selling drinks in a refrigerator and petrol in plastic bottles, on the island of Don Khon.

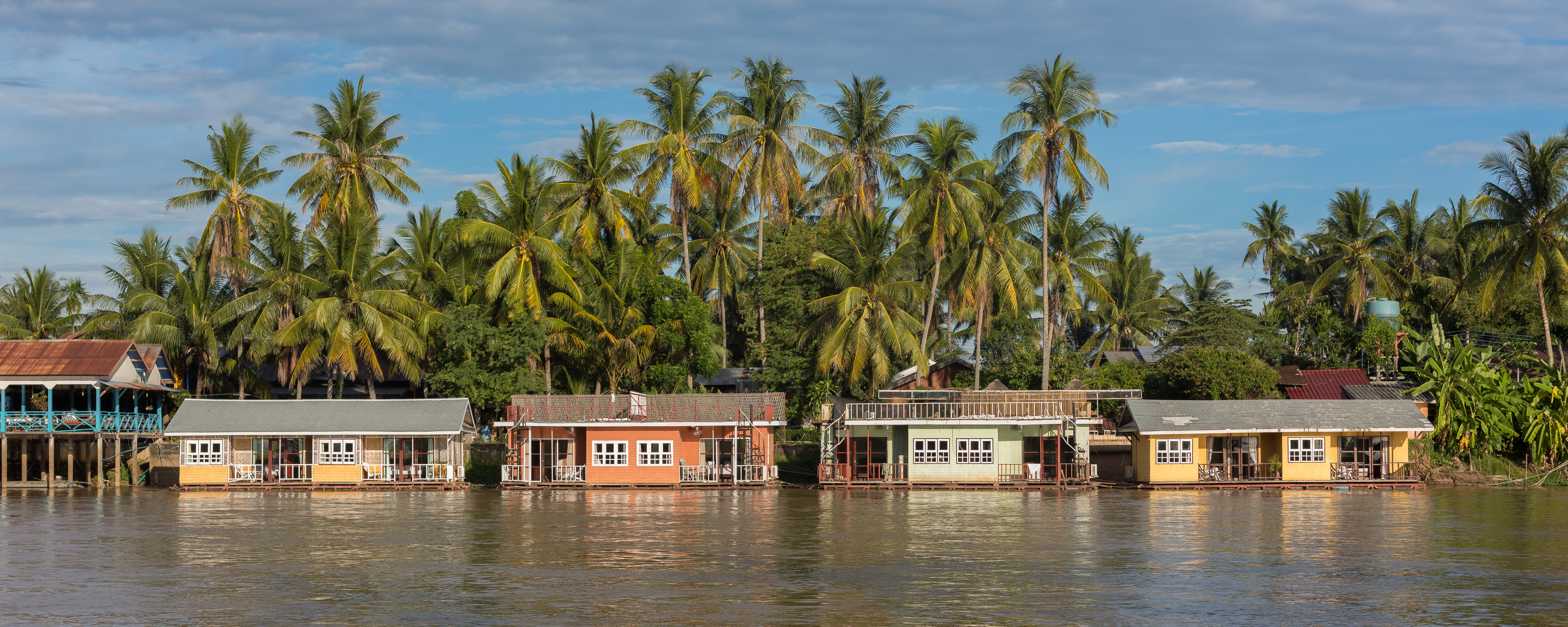
Colorful floating bungalows of Sala Don Khone Hotel, Mekong bank in front of tall palm trees, Don Khon in late afternoon, picture taken from Don Det.

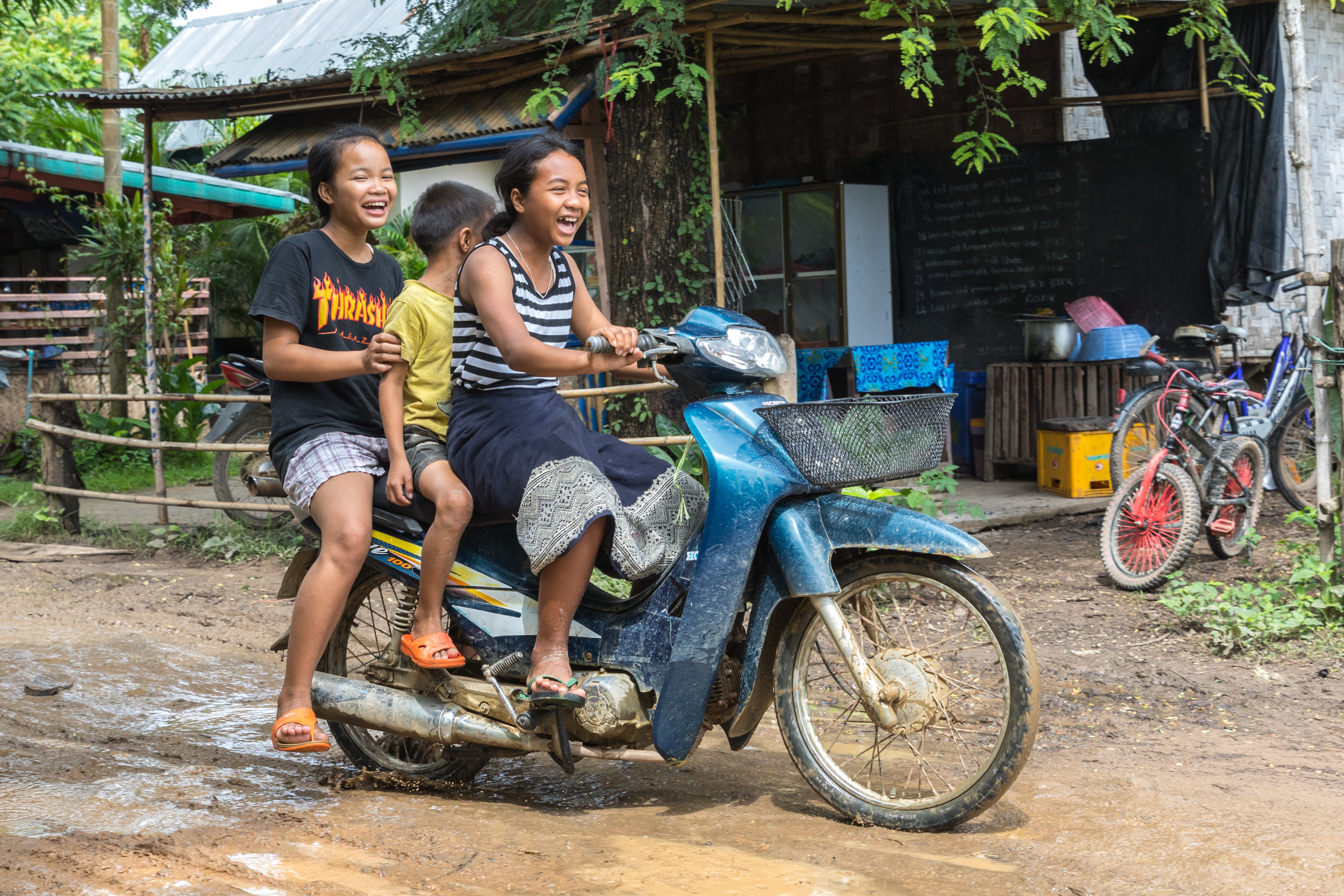
Girl riding a motorcycle with two passengers laughing on the muddy slope of Don Khon.
