= Khong district, Laos =

Khong District, Laos ເມືອງໂຂງ
- District
- Country: Laos
- Province: Champasak province
- Time zone: UTC+7 (ICT)

Khong District, Laos is a district (muang) of Champasak province in southwestern Laos. The district borders Cambodia in the far south and is known for the Khonephapheng Waterfalls and the Si Phan Don (4000 Islands) area.
