= Howmeh-ye Gharbi Rural District (Izeh County) =

Rural district in Khuzestan province, Iran

Howmeh-ye Gharbi Rural District Persian: دهستان حومه غربي
- Rural District
- Location within Iran
- Coordinates: 31°52′39″N 49°48′21″E
- Country: Iran
- Province: Khuzestan
- County: Izeh
- District: Central
- Capital: Rasfand

Population (2016)
  - Total: 7,711
- Time zone: UTC+3:30 (IRST)

Howmeh-ye Gharbi Rural District (Persian: دهستان حومه غربي) is in the Central District of Izeh County, Khuzestan province, Iran. Its capital is the village of Rasfand.

== Demographics ==
=== Population ===
At the time of the 2006 National Census, the rural district's population was 8,813 in 1,587 households. There were 8,118 inhabitants in 1,765 households at the following census of 2011. The 2016 census measured the population of the rural district as 7,711 in 1,789 households. The most populous of its 28 villages was Balutak-e Sheykhan, with 2,288 people.
