= Nurabad =

Nurabad or Noor Abad (Persian: نورآباد) may refer to many Iranian settlements:

== Bushehr Province ==
- Nurabad, Bushehr, a village in Dashtestan County, Bushehr Province, Iran

== Chaharmahal and Bakhtiari Province ==
- Nurabad, Chaharmahal and Bakhtiari, a village in Lordegan County
- Nurabad, Shahrekord, a village in Shahrekord County

== East Azerbaijan Province ==
- Nurabad, East Azerbaijan, in Marand County

== Fars Province ==
- Nurabad, Eqlid, a village in Eqlid County
- Nurabad, Fasa, a village in Fasa County
- Nurabad, Kharameh, a village in Kharameh County
- Nurabad, Fars, a city in Mamasani County
- Nurabad, Mohr, a village in Mohr County

== Golestan Province ==
- Nurabad, Golestan, a village in Gonbad-e Qabus County, Golestan Province, Iran

== Hamadan Province ==
- Nurabad-e Simineh, a village in Bahar County, Hamadan Province, Iran
- Nurabad-e Hajjilu, a village in Kabudarahang County, Hamadan Province, Iran

== Hormozgan Province ==
- Nurabad, Bandar Lengeh, a village in Bandar Lengeh County
- Nurabad, Rudan, a village in Rudan County

== Ilam Province ==
- Nurabad, Ilam, a village in Shirvan and Chardaval County

== Isfahan Province ==
- Nurabad, Buin va Miandasht, a village in Buin va Miandasht County
- Nurabad, Semirom, a village in Semirom County
- Nurabad, Padena, a village in Semirom County
- Nurabad Rural District (Isfahan Province), in Mobarakeh County

== Kerman Province ==
- Nurabad, Esmaili, a village in Anbarabad County
- Nurabad, Hoseynabad, a village in Anbarabad County
- Nurabad 1, a village in Kahnuj County
- Nurabad 2, a village in Kahnuj County
- Nurabad, Manujan, a village in Manujan County
- Nurabad, Nurabad, a village in Manujan County
- Nurabad Rural District (Kerman Province), in Manujan County

== Kermanshah Province ==
- Nurabad, Salas-e Babajani, a village in Salas-e Babajani County
- Nurabad, Sonqor, a village in Sonqor County

== Khuzestan Province ==
- Nurabad, Andimeshk, a village in Andimeshk County
- Nurabad, Dezful, a village in Dezful County
- Nurabad, Izeh, a village in Izeh County

== Kurdistan Province ==
- Nurabad, Kurdistan, a village in Saqqez County

== Lorestan Province ==
- Nurabad, Lorestan, city in the province of Lorestan
- Nurabad, Khorramabad, a village in Khorramabad County
- Nurabad, alternate name of Cheshmeh Barad, in the province of Lorestan
- Nurabad-e Cheshmeh Barqi, in the province of Lorestan
- Nurabad-e Nadar, in the province of Lorestan
- Nurabad Rural District (Lorestan Province)

== Markazi Province ==
- Nurabad, Ashtian, a village in Ashtian County
- Nurabad, Khomeyn, a village in Khomeyn County
- Nurabad, Shazand, a village in Shazand County

== Qazvin Province ==
- Nurabad, Qazvin

== Qom Province ==
- Nurabad, Jafarabad, in Qom Province
- Nurabad, Khalajestan, in Qom Province

== Razavi Khorasan Province ==
- Nurabad, Khoshab, a village in Khoshab County
- Nurabad, Mashhad, a village in Mashhad County
- Nurabad, Nishapur, a village in Nishapur County
- Nurabad, Sabzevar, a village in Sabzevar County
- Nurabad, Torqabeh and Shandiz, a village in Torqabeh and Shandiz County
- Nurabad, Zaveh, a village in Zaveh County

== Sistan and Baluchestan Province ==
- Nurabad-e Naluki, a village in Dalgan County
- Nurabad-e Dasht Abkhvan, a village in Khash County
- Nurabad-e Sar Talap, a village in Khash County

== Tehran Province ==
- Nurabad, Tehran, in Malard County

== West Azerbaijan Province ==
- Nurabad, West Azerbaijan, a village in Showt County

== Yazd Province ==
- Nurabad, Mehriz, a village in Mehriz County
- Nurabad, Taft, a village in Taft County

== Zanjan Province ==
- Nurabad, Zanjan, a city in Khodabandeh County

== Other uses ==
- Nurabad Rural District (disambiguation)

== See also ==
- Nurobod (disambiguation)
