= Tajabad (disambiguation) =

Tajabad is one of the former names of Herat, Iran.

Tajabad (Persian: تاج اباد) may also refer to:

== Fars Province ==
- Tajabad, Marvdasht, a village in Marvdasht County
- Tajabad, Zarrin Dasht, a village in Zarrin Dasht County

== Hamadan Province ==
- Tajabad-e Olya, Hamadan, Hamadan Province
- Tajabad-e Sofla, Hamadan, Hamadan Province

== Isfahan Province ==
- Tajabad, Natanz, a village in Natanz County

== Kerman Province ==
- Tajabad, Anbarabad, Kerman Province
- Tajabad, Baft, Kerman Province
- Tajabad, Bardsir, Kerman Province
- Tajabad-e Yek, Bardsir, Bardsir County, Kerman Province
- Tajabad, Jiroft, Kerman Province
- Tajabad, Kahnuj, Kerman Province
- Tajabad-e Do, Kahnuj, Kahnuj County, Kerman Province
- Tajabad, Derakhtengan, Kerman County, Kerman Province
- Tajabad, Narmashir, Kerman Province
- Tajabad, Rafsanjan, Kerman Province
- Tajabad-e Kohneh, Rafsanjan County, Kerman Province
- Tajabad-e Olya, Rudbar-e Jonubi County, Kerman Province
- Tajabad, Zarand, Kerman Province

== Kurdistan Province ==
- Tajabad, Divandarreh, Kurdistan Province
- Tajabad, Qorveh, Kurdistan Province

== Razavi Khorasan Province ==
- Tajabad, Razavi Khorasan

== Sistan and Baluchestan Province ==
- Tajabad, Sistan and Baluchestan

== South Khorasan Province ==
- Tajabad, Tabas, South Khorasan Province
