= Sharikabad =

Sharikabad (Persian: شريك اباد) may refer to:

- Sharikabad, Hormozgan
- Sharikabad, Faryab, Kerman Province
- Sharikabad, Kahnuj, Kerman Province
- Sharikabad, Qaleh Ganj, Kerman Province
- Sharikabad, alternate name of Suragabad, Qaleh Ganj, Kerman Province
- Sharikabad, Rudbar-e Jonubi, Kerman Province
- Sharikabad, Sirjan, Kerman Province
- Sharikabad, Chahar Gonbad, Sirjan County Kerman Province
- Sharikabad-e Mokhtar Abbaslu, Kerman Province
- Sharikabad-e Olya, Kerman Province
