= Kutak =

Kutak or Kootak (Persian: كوتك), also rendered as Kuh Tak, may refer to:

- Kutak, Hajjiabad, Hormozgan province
- Kutak, Jask, Hormozgan province
- Kutak-e Qalat, Hormozgan province
- Kutak-e Rayisi, Hormozgan province
- Kutak-e Bala Shomareh-ye Yek, Kerman province
- Kutak-e Pain, Kerman province
- Kutak-e Vasat, Kerman province
- Kutak Rural District, Kerman province
- Kutak-e Jajji Aqa, Khuzestan province
- Kutak-e Mohammad Karim, Khuzestan province
