= Kahurabad =

Kahurabad or Kehurabad (Persian: كهوراباد) may refer to:

- Kahurabad, Anbarabad
- Kahurabad, Jiroft
- Kahurabad, alternate name of Moradabad, Jiroft
- Kahurabad-e Chahchupan-e Do, Kahnuj County
- Kahurabad-e Sohrabi, Kahnuj County
