= Deh Pish =

Deh Pish or Deh-e Pish (Persian: ده پيش) may refer to:

- Deh Pish-e Olya, Jiroft
- Deh Pish-e Sofla, Jiroft
- Deh Pish-e Olya, Kahnuj
- Deh Pish-e Sofla, Kahnuj
