= Sohran, Iran =

Sohran or Sahran (Persian: سهران), also rendered as Sohrun or Sohrown, may refer to:

- Sohran, East Azerbaijan
- Sohran, Hamadan
- Sohran, Jask, Hormozgan Province
- Sohran, Minab, Hormozgan Province
- Sohran, Isfahan
- Sohran-e Olya, Kerman Province
- Sohran-e Sofla, Kerman Province
- Sohran-e Vosta, Kerman Province
- Sahran, Sistan and Baluchestan
