= Bandkuh =

Bandkuh بندکوه
- Village
- Location within Iran
- Coordinates: 27°40′24″N 57°39′57″E
- Country: Iran
- Province: Kerman
- County: Kahnuj
- Bakhsh: Central
- Rural District: Deh Kahan

Population (2006)
  - Total: 590
- Time zone: UTC+3:30 (IRST)
  - Summer (DST): UTC+4:30 (IRDT)

Bandkuh (Persian: بندکوه, also Romanized as Bandkūh) is a village in Deh Kahan Rural District, Central District (Kahnuj County), Kahnuj County, Kerman Province, Iran. At the 2006 census, its population was 590, in 130 families.
