= Rashgurd =

Rashgurd رشگورد
- Village
- Location within Iran
- Coordinates: 27°51′54″N 57°38′28″E
- Country: Iran
- Province: Kerman
- County: Kahnuj
- Bakhsh: Central
- Rural District: Nakhlestan

Population (2006)
  - Total: 756
- Time zone: UTC+3:30 (IRST)
  - Summer (DST): UTC+4:30 (IRDT)

Rashgurd (Persian: رشگورد, also Romanized as Rashgūrd; also known as Rashgard and Rashkord) is a village in Nakhlestan Rural District, in the Central District of Kahnuj County, Kerman Province, Iran. At the 2006 census, its population was 756, in 162 families.
