= Chah Hajji =

Village in Kerman province, Iran

Chah Hajji Persian: چاه حاجي
- Village
- Location within Iran
- Coordinates: 27°53′49″N 57°27′37″E
- Country: Iran
- Province: Kerman
- County: Kahnuj
- District: Chah Morid
- Rural District: Howmeh

Population (2016)
  - Total: 692
- Time zone: UTC+3:30 (IRST)

Chah Hajji (Persian: چاه حاجي) (Note: Also romanized as Chāh Ḩājjī) is a village in, and the capital of, Howmeh Rural District of Chah Morid District, Kahnuj County, Kerman province, Iran.

== Demographics ==
=== Population ===
At the time of the 2006 National Census, the village's population was 667 in 155 households, when it was in the Central District of Kahnuj County. The following census in 2011 counted 642 people in 178 households, by which time the rural district had been separated from the district in the formation of Chah Morid District. The 2016 census measured the population of the village as 692 people in 212 households.
