= Mahmudabad-e Azali =

Mahmudabad-e Azali محمود آباد ازلي
- Village
- Location within Iran
- Coordinates: 27°54′44″N 57°42′09″E
- Country: Iran
- Province: Kerman
- County: Kahnuj
- Bakhsh: Central
- Rural District: Nakhlestan

Population (2006)
  - Total: 239
- Time zone: UTC+3:30 (IRST)
  - Summer (DST): UTC+4:30 (IRDT)

Mahmudabad-e Azali (Persian: محمود آباد ازلي, also Romanized as Maḩmūdābād-e Āzalī; also known as Maḩmūdābād, Moḩammadābād, Muhammadābād, and Muhaniprābād) is a village in Nakhlestan Rural District, in the Central District of Kahnuj County, Kerman Province, Iran. At the 2006 census, its population was 239, in 51 families.
