= Ekhtyiarabad-e Do Ziyarati =

Ekhtyiarabad-e Do Ziyarati اختياراباددوزيارتي
- Village
- Location within Iran
- Coordinates: 27°57′14″N 57°41′09″E
- Country: Iran
- Province: Kerman
- County: Kahnuj
- Bakhsh: Central
- Rural District: Nakhlestan

Population (2006)
  - Total: 111
- Time zone: UTC+3:30 (IRST)
  - Summer (DST): UTC+4:30 (IRDT)

Ekhtyiarabad-e Do Ziyarati (Persian: اختياراباددوزيارتي, also Romanized as Ekhtyīārābād-e Do Zīyāratī; also known as Ekhtyīārābād) is a village in Nakhlestan Rural District, in the Central District of Kahnuj County, Kerman Province, Iran. At the 2006 census, its population was 111, in 25 families.
