= Poshteh-ye Dulabad =

Poshteh-ye Dulabad پشته دول اباد
- Village
- Location within Iran
- Coordinates: 27°55′13″N 57°39′33″E
- Country: Iran
- Province: Kerman
- County: Kahnuj
- Bakhsh: Central
- Rural District: Nakhlestan

Population (2006)
  - Total: 138
- Time zone: UTC+3:30 (IRST)
  - Summer (DST): UTC+4:30 (IRDT)

Poshteh-ye Dulabad (Persian: پشته دول اباد, also Romanized as Poshteh-ye Dūlābād) is a village in Nakhlestan Rural District, in the Central District of Kahnuj County, Kerman Province, Iran. At the 2006 census, its population was 138, in 34 families.
