= Sefidmorad =

Sefidmorad سفيدمراد
- Village
- Location within Iran
- Coordinates: 27°52′26″N 57°32′46″E
- Country: Iran
- Province: Kerman
- County: Kahnuj
- Bakhsh: Central
- Rural District: Howmeh

Population (2006)
  - Total: 627
- Time zone: UTC+3:30 (IRST)
  - Summer (DST): UTC+4:30 (IRDT)

Sefidmorad (Persian: سفيدمراد, also Romanized as Sefīdmorād) is a village in Howmeh Rural District, in the Central District of Kahnuj County, Kerman Province, Iran. At the 2006 census, its population was 627, in 158 families.
