= Kahurmiri =

Kahurmiri كهورميري
- Village
- Interactive map of Kahurmiri
- Country: Iran
- Province: Kerman
- County: Kahnuj
- Bakhsh: Central
- Rural District: Howmeh

Population (2006)
  - Total: 235
- Time zone: UTC+3:30 (IRST)
  - Summer (DST): UTC+4:30 (IRDT)

Kahurmiri (Persian: كهورميري, also Romanized as Kahūrmīrī) is a village in Howmeh Rural District, in the Central District of Kahnuj County, Kerman Province, Iran. At the 2006 census, its population was 235, in 44 families.
