= Deh Zard =

Deh Zard ده زرد
- Village
- Location within Iran
- Coordinates: 27°55′47″N 57°29′05″E
- Country: Iran
- Province: Kerman
- County: Kahnuj
- Bakhsh: Central
- Rural District: Howmeh

Population (2006)
  - Total: 451
- Time zone: UTC+3:30 (IRST)
  - Summer (DST): UTC+4:30 (IRDT)

Deh Zard (Persian: ده زرد) is a village in Howmeh Rural District, in the Central District of Kahnuj County, Kerman Province, Iran. At the 2006 census, its population was 451, in 88 families.
