= Luk-e Pa-e Jadid =

Luk-e Pa-e Jadid لوك پاجديد
- Village
- Location within Iran
- Coordinates: 27°53′37″N 57°40′33″E
- Country: Iran
- Province: Kerman
- County: Kahnuj
- Bakhsh: Central
- Rural District: Nakhlestan

Population (2006)
  - Total: 476
- Time zone: UTC+3:30 (IRST)
  - Summer (DST): UTC+4:30 (IRDT)

Luk-e Pa-e Jadid (Persian: لوك پاجديد, also Romanized as Lūk-e Pā-e Jadīd; also known as Lok-e Pājadīd) is a village in Nakhlestan Rural District, in the Central District of Kahnuj County, Kerman Province, Iran. At the 2006 census, its population was 476, in 99 families.
