= Deharan =

Deharan دهاران
- Village
- Location within Iran
- Coordinates: 27°46′04″N 57°41′11″E
- Country: Iran
- Province: Kerman
- County: Kahnuj
- Bakhsh: Central
- Rural District: Deh Kahan

Population (2006)
  - Total: 293
- Time zone: UTC+3:30 (IRST)
  - Summer (DST): UTC+4:30 (IRDT)

Deharan (Persian: دهاران, also Romanized as Dehārān) is a village in Deh Kahan Rural District, Central District, Kahnuj County, Kerman Province, Iran. At the 2006 census, its population was 293, in 54 families.
