= Sahlavar =

Sahlavar سهل اور
- Village
- Location within Iran
- Coordinates: 27°51′49″N 57°39′17″E
- Country: Iran
- Province: Kerman
- County: Kahnuj
- Bakhsh: Central
- Rural District: Nakhlestan

Population (2006)
  - Total: 781
- Time zone: UTC+3:30 (IRST)
  - Summer (DST): UTC+4:30 (IRDT)

Sahlavar (Persian: سهل اور, also Romanized as Sahlāvar; also known as Sarlāvar) is a village in Nakhlestan Rural District, in the Central District of Kahnuj County, Kerman Province, Iran. At the 2006 census, its population was 781, in 167 families.
