= Paygah-e Ashayiri =

Paygah-e Ashayiri پايگاه عشايري
- Village
- Interactive map of Paygah-e Ashayiri
- Country: Iran
- Province: Kerman
- County: Kahnuj
- Bakhsh: Central
- Rural District: Nakhlestan

Population (2006)
  - Total: 204
- Time zone: UTC+3:30 (IRST)
  - Summer (DST): UTC+4:30 (IRDT)

Paygah-e Ashayiri (Persian: پايگاه عشايري, also Romanized as Pāygāh-e ʿAshāyīrī) is a village in Nakhlestan Rural District, in the Central District of Kahnuj County, Kerman Province, Iran. At the 2006 census, its population was 204, in 41 families.
