= Bargah-e Namahram =

Bargah-e Namahram بارگاه نامحرم
- village
- Location within Iran
- Coordinates: 27°36′12″N 57°38′31″E
- Country: Iran
- Province: Kerman
- County: Kahnuj
- Bakhsh: Central
- Rural District: Deh Kahan

Population (2006)
  - Total: 191
- Time zone: UTC+3:30 (IRST)
  - Summer (DST): UTC+4:30 (IRDT)

Bargah-e Namahram (Persian: بارگاه نامحرم, also Romanized as Bārgāh-e Nāmahram) is a village in Deh Kahan Rural District, Central District, Kahnuj County, Kerman Province, Iran. At the 2006 census, its population was 191, in 34 families.
