= Tom Guran =

Tom Guran تم گوران
- Village
- Interactive map of Tom Guran
- Country: Iran
- Province: Kerman
- County: Kahnuj
- Bakhsh: Central
- Rural District: Nakhlestan

Population (2006)
  - Total: 344
- Time zone: UTC+3:30 (IRST)
  - Summer (DST): UTC+4:30 (IRDT)

Tom Guran (Persian: تم گوران, also Romanized as Tom Gūrān) is a village in Nakhlestan Rural District, in the Central District of Kahnuj County, Kerman Province, Iran. At the 2006 census, its population was 344, in 80 families.
