= Goharak =

Goharak گهرک
- Village
- Location within Iran
- Coordinates: 27°58′48″N 57°47′25″E
- Country: Iran
- Province: Kerman
- County: Kahnuj
- Bakhsh: Central
- Rural District: Nakhlestan

Population (2006)
  - Total: 275
- Time zone: UTC+3:30 (IRST)
  - Summer (DST): UTC+4:30 (IRDT)

Goharak (Persian: گهرک; also known as Gowharak) is a village in Nakhlestan Rural District, in the Central District of Kahnuj County, Kerman Province, Iran. At the 2006 census, its population was 275, in 56 families.
