= Divan Morad-e Olya =

Divan Morad-e Olya ديوان مرادعليا
- Village
- Location within Iran
- Coordinates: 27°58′42″N 57°29′23″E
- Country: Iran
- Province: Kerman
- County: Kahnuj
- Bakhsh: Central
- Rural District: Howmeh

Population (2006)
  - Total: 56
- Time zone: UTC+3:30 (IRST)
  - Summer (DST): UTC+4:30 (IRDT)

Divan Morad-e Olya (Persian: ديوان مرادعليا, also Romanized as Dīvān Morād-e ‘Olyā; also known as Zīārat-e Dīvān Morād-e Bālā and Zīārat-e Dīvān Morād ‘Olyā) is a village in Howmeh Rural District, in the Central District of Kahnuj County, Kerman Province, Iran. At the 2006 census, its population was 56, in 16 families.
