= Bon Gowd =

Bon Gowd بن گود
- Village
- Location within Iran
- Coordinates: 27°57′23″N 57°37′18″E
- Country: Iran
- Province: Kerman
- County: Kahnuj
- Bakhsh: Central
- Rural District: Howmeh

Population (2006)
  - Total: 60
- Time zone: UTC+3:30 (IRST)
  - Summer (DST): UTC+4:30 (IRDT)

Bon Gowd (Persian: بن گود, also Romanized as Bon-e Gowd and Bongowd) is a village in Howmeh Rural District, in the Central District of Kahnuj County, Kerman Province, Iran. At the 2006 census, its population was 60, in 12 families.
