= Pay Kuh-e Sefid =

Village in Kerman, Iran

Pay Kuh-e Sefid پاي كوه سفيد
- Village
- Location within Iran
- Coordinates: 27°52′22″N 57°31′29″E
- Country: Iran
- Province: Kerman
- County: Kahnuj
- Bakhsh: Central
- Rural District: Howmeh

Population (2006)
  - Total: 81
- Time zone: UTC+3:30 (IRST)
  - Summer (DST): UTC+4:30 (IRDT)

Pay Kuh-e Sefid (Persian: پاي كوه سفيد, also Romanized as Pāy Kūh-e Sefīd) is a village in Howmeh Rural District, in the Central District of Kahnuj County, Kerman Province, Iran. At the 2006 census, its population was 81, in 20 families.
