= Saidabad, Kahnuj =

Saidabad سعيداباد
- Village
- Location within Iran
- Coordinates: 28°09′08″N 57°50′48″E
- Country: Iran
- Province: Kerman
- County: Kahnuj
- Bakhsh: Central
- Rural District: Nakhlestan

Population (2006)
  - Total: 393
- Time zone: UTC+3:30 (IRST)
  - Summer (DST): UTC+4:30 (IRDT)

Saidabad (Persian: سعيداباد, also Romanized as Sa‘īdābād; also known as Sa‘īdābād-e Sohrān) is a village in Nakhlestan Rural District, in the Central District of Kahnuj County, Kerman Province, Iran. At the 2006 census, its population was 393, in 78 families.
