= Rig Zardan =

Rig Zardan ريگ زردان
- Village
- Location within Iran
- Coordinates: 27°52′59″N 57°40′40″E
- Country: Iran
- Province: Kerman
- County: Kahnuj
- Bakhsh: Central
- Rural District: Nakhlestan

Population (2006)
  - Total: 509
- Time zone: UTC+3:30 (IRST)
  - Summer (DST): UTC+4:30 (IRDT)

Rig Zardan (Persian: ريگ زردان, also Romanized as Rīg Zardān) is a village in Nakhlestan Rural District, in the Central District of Kahnuj County, Kerman Province, Iran. At the 2006 census, its population was 509, in 104 families.
