= Dowlabad =

Dowlabad دول اباد
- Village
- Location within Iran
- Coordinates: 27°54′40″N 57°39′16″E
- Country: Iran
- Province: Kerman
- County: Kahnuj
- Bakhsh: Central
- Rural District: Nakhlestan

Population (2006)
  - Total: 559
- Time zone: UTC+3:30 (IRST)
  - Summer (DST): UTC+4:30 (IRDT)

Dowlabad (Persian: دول اباد, also Romanized as Dowlābād) is a village in Nakhlestan Rural District, in the Central District of Kahnuj County, Kerman Province, Iran. At the 2006 census, its population was 559, in 120 families.
