= Deh-e Hut =

Village in Kerman province, Iran

Deh-e Hut Persian: ده حوت
- Village
- Location within Iran
- Coordinates: 27°55′26″N 57°28′47″E
- Country: Iran
- Province: Kerman
- County: Kahnuj
- District: Chah Morid
- Rural District: Howmeh

Population (2016)
  - Total: 1,198
- Time zone: UTC+3:30 (IRST)

Deh-e Hut (Persian: ده حوت) (Note: Also romanized as Deh-e Ḩūt and Dehḥūt) is a village in Howmeh Rural District of Chah Morid District, Kahnuj County, Kerman province, Iran.

== Demographics ==
=== Population ===
At the time of the 2006 National Census, the village's population was 949 in 178 households, when it was in the Central District of Kahnuj County. The following census in 2011 counted 1,096 people in 253 households, by which time the rural district had been separated from the district in the establishment of Chah Morid District. The 2016 census measured the population of the village as 1,198 people in 304 households. It was the most populous village in its rural district.
