= Mijan =

Mijan ميجان
- Village
- Interactive map of Mijan
- Country: Iran
- Province: Kerman
- County: Kahnuj
- Bakhsh: Central
- Rural District: Deh Kahan

Population (2006)
  - Total: 25
- Time zone: UTC+3:30 (IRST)
  - Summer (DST): UTC+4:30 (IRDT)

Mijan (Persian: ميجان, also Romanized as Mījān) is a village in Deh Kahan Rural District, Central District, Kahnuj County, Kerman Province, Iran. At the 2021 census, its population was 6, in 6 families.
