= Rustai-ye Shahid Kivan Mirshkari =

Rustai-ye Shahid Kivan Mirshkari روستاي شهيدکيوان ميرشکاري
- Village
- Interactive map of Rustai-ye Shahid Kivan Mirshkari
- Country: Iran
- Province: Kerman
- County: Kahnuj
- Bakhsh: Central
- Rural District: Nakhlestan

Population (2006)
  - Total: 136
- Time zone: UTC+3:30 (IRST)
  - Summer (DST): UTC+4:30 (IRDT)

Rustai-ye Shahid Kivan Mirshkari (Persian: روستاي شهيدکيوان ميرشکاري, also Romanized as Rūstāī-ye Shahīd Kīvān Mīrshkārī) is a village in Nakhlestan Rural District, in the Central District of Kahnuj County, Kerman Province, Iran. At the 2006 census, its population was 136, in 33 families.
