= Bargah-e Sofla =

Village in Kerman province, Iran

Bargah-e Sofla Persian: بارگاه سفلی
- Village
- Location within Iran
- Coordinates: 27°38′20″N 57°38′57″E
- Country: Iran
- Province: Kerman
- County: Kahnuj
- District: Central
- Rural District: Dehkahan

Population (2016)
  - Total: 453
- Time zone: UTC+3:30 (IRST)

Bargah-e Sofla (Persian: بارگاه سفلی) (Note: Also romanized as Bārgāh-e Soflā) is a village in Dehkahan Rural District of the Central District, Kahnuj County, Kerman province, Iran.

== Demographics ==
=== Population ===
At the time of the 2011 National Census, the village's population was 424 in 119 households. The following census in 2016 counted 453 people in 125 households.
