= Kahurabad-e Chahchupan-e Do =

Kahurabad-e Chahchupan-e Do كهورابادچاه چوپان 2
- Village
- Location within Iran
- Coordinates: 27°53′28″N 57°26′44″E
- Country: Iran
- Province: Kerman
- County: Kahnuj
- Bakhsh: Central
- Rural District: Howmeh

Population (2006)
  - Total: 763
- Time zone: UTC+3:30 (IRST)
  - Summer (DST): UTC+4:30 (IRDT)

Kahurabad-e Chahchupan-e Do (Persian: كهورابادچاه چوپان 2, also Romanized as Kahūrābād-e Chāhchūpān-e Do; also known as Kahūrābād-e Chāhchūpān) is a village in Howmeh Rural District, in the Central District of Kahnuj County, Kerman Province, Iran. At the 2006 census, its population was 763, in 143 families.
