= Zeh, Nakhlestan =

Village in Kerman province, Iran

Zeh Persian: زه
- Village
- Location within Iran
- Coordinates: 27°55′27″N 57°40′08″E
- Country: Iran
- Province: Kerman
- County: Kahnuj
- District: Central
- Rural District: Nakhlestan

Population (2016)
  - Total: 711
- Time zone: UTC+3:30 (IRST)

Zeh (Persian: زه) is a village in, and the capital of, Nakhlestan Rural District of the Central District of Kahnuj County, Kerman province, Iran.

== Demographics ==
=== Population ===
At the time of the 2006 National Census, the village's population was 1,098 in 225 households. The following census in 2011 counted 976 people in 241 households. The 2016 census measured the population of the village as 711 in 200 households.
