= Sohran-e Olya =

Sohran-e Olya سهران عليا
- Village
- Location within Iran
- Coordinates: 28°08′18″N 57°50′44″E
- Country: Iran
- Province: Kerman
- County: Kahnuj
- Bakhsh: Central
- Rural District: Nakhlestan

Population (2006)
  - Total: 309
- Time zone: UTC+3:30 (IRST)
  - Summer (DST): UTC+4:30 (IRDT)

Sohran-e Olya (Persian: سهران عليا, also Romanized as Sohrān-e ‘Olyā; also known as Sohrūn-e Bālā (Persian: سهرون بالا) and Sohrān-e Bālā) is a village in Nakhlestan Rural District, in the Central District of Kahnuj County, Kerman Province, Iran. At the 2006 census, its population was 309, in 73 families.
