= Bargah =

Bargah or Baregah (Persian: بارگاه) may refer to:

- Bargah, East Azerbaijan
- Bargah, Kerman
