= Deh Pish-e Olya =

Deh Pish-e Olya (Persian: ده پيش عليا), also known as Deh Pish-e Bala, may refer to:

- Deh Pish-e Olya, Jiroft
- Deh Pish-e Olya, Kahnuj
