= Chah Rigan Rural District =

Rural district in Kerman province, Iran

Chah Rigan Rural District Persian: دهستان چاه ریگان
- Rural District
- Location within Iran
- Coordinates: 27°57′13″N 57°34′41″E
- Country: Iran
- Province: Kerman
- County: Kahnuj
- District: Chah Morid
- Capital: Chah Morid

Population (2016)
  - Total: 6,013
- Time zone: UTC+3:30 (IRST)

Chah Rigan Rural District (Persian: دهستان چاه ریگان) is in Chah Morid District of Kahnuj County, Kerman province, Iran. It is administered from the city of Chah Morid.

== History ==
After the 2006 National Census, Howmeh Rural District was separated from the Central District in the establishment of Chah Morid District. Chah Rigan Rural District was created in the new district.

== Demographics ==
=== Population ===
At the time of the 2011 census, the rural district's population was 5,791 in 1,441 households. The 2016 census measured the population of the rural district as 6,013 in 1,639 households. The most populous of its 27 villages was Chah Morid (now a city), with 1,362 people.
