= Kahurabad-e Sohrabi =

Kahurabad-e Sohrabi كهورابادسهرابي
- Village
- Location within Iran
- Coordinates: 27°54′14″N 57°28′13″E
- Country: Iran
- Province: Kerman
- County: Kahnuj
- Bakhsh: Central
- Rural District: Howmeh

Population (2006)
  - Total: 544
- Time zone: UTC+3:30 (IRST)
  - Summer (DST): UTC+4:30 (IRDT)

Kahurabad-e Sohrabi (Persian: كهورابادسهرابي, also Romanized as Kahūrābād-e Sohrābī) is a village in Howmeh Rural District, in the Central District of Kahnuj County, Kerman Province, Iran. At the 2006 census, its population was 544, in 92 families.
