= Tajabad-e Do, Kahnuj =

Tajabad-e Do تاج اباد2
- Village
- Location within Iran
- Coordinates: 28°17′38″N 57°44′19″E
- Country: Iran
- Province: Kerman
- County: Kahnuj
- Bakhsh: Central
- Rural District: Howmeh

Population (2006)
  - Total: 184
- Time zone: UTC+3:30 (IRST)
  - Summer (DST): UTC+4:30 (IRDT)

Tajabad-e Do (Persian: تاج اباد2, also Romanized as Tājābād-e Do; also known as Tājābād) is a village in Howmeh Rural District, in the Central District of Kahnuj County, Kerman Province, Iran. At the 2006 census, its population was 184, in 33 families.
