= Kutak-e Pain =

Village in Kerman province, Iran

Kutak-e Pain Persian: كوتك پايين
- Village
- Location within Iran
- Coordinates: 27°52′32″N 57°37′23″E
- Country: Iran
- Province: Kerman
- County: Kahnuj
- District: Central
- Rural District: Kutak

Population (2016)
  - Total: 1,180
- Time zone: UTC+3:30 (IRST)

Kutak-e Pain (Persian: كوتك پايين) (Note: Also romanized as Kūtak-e Pā’īn; also known as Kūtak) is a village in Kutak Rural District of the Central District of Kahnuj County, Kerman province, Iran.

== Demographics ==
=== Population ===
At the time of the 2006 National Census, the village's population was 1,149 in 245 households, when it was in Nakhlestan Rural District. The following census in 2011 counted 1,011 people in 247 households, by which time the village had been transferred to Kutak Rural District created in the district. The 2016 census measured the population of the village as 1,180 people in 320 households. It was the most populous village in its rural district.
