= Suragabad =

Suragabad or Suregabad (Persian: سورگ اباد) may refer to:

- Suragabad, Qaleh Ganj
- Suragabad, Sorkh Qaleh, Qaleh Ganj County
