= Nurabad-e Yek =

Nurabad-e Yek نور آباد1
- Village
- Location within Iran
- Coordinates: 27°54′45″N 57°41′09″E
- Country: Iran
- Province: Kerman
- County: Kahnuj
- Bakhsh: Central
- Rural District: Nakhlestan

Population (2006)
  - Total: 929
- Time zone: UTC+3:30 (IRST)
  - Summer (DST): UTC+4:30 (IRDT)

Nurabad-e Yek (Persian: نور آباد1, also Romanized as Nūrābād-e Yek; also known as Nūrābād) is a village in Nakhlestan Rural District, in the Central District of Kahnuj County, Kerman Province, Iran. At the 2006 census, its population was 929, in 176 families.
