= Sohran-e Vosta =

Sohran-e Vosta سهران وسطي
- Village
- Location within Iran
- Coordinates: 28°07′27″N 57°50′19″E
- Country: Iran
- Province: Kerman
- County: Kahnuj
- Bakhsh: Central
- Rural District: Nakhlestan

Population (2006)
  - Total: 636
- Time zone: UTC+3:30 (IRST)
  - Summer (DST): UTC+4:30 (IRDT)

Sohran-e Vosta (Persian: سهران وسطي, also Romanized as Sohrān-e Vosţá; also known as Sohrān-e Vasaţ) is a village in Nakhlestan Rural District, in the Central District of Kahnuj County, Kerman Province, Iran. At the 2006 census, its population was 636, in 138 families.
