= Sharikabad-e Olya =

Sharikabad-e Olya شريك ابادعليا
- Village
- Location within Iran
- Coordinates: 27°49′42″N 57°58′25″E
- Country: Iran
- Province: Kerman
- County: Kahnuj
- Bakhsh: Central
- Rural District: Nakhlestan

Population (2006)
  - Total: 15
- Time zone: UTC+3:30 (IRST)
  - Summer (DST): UTC+4:30 (IRDT)

Sharikabad-e Olya (Persian: شريك ابادعليا, also Romanized as Sharīkābād-e ‘Olyā; also known as Sharīkābād) is a village in Nakhlestan Rural District, in the Central District of Kahnuj County, Kerman Province, Iran. At the 2006 census, its population was 15, in 5 families.
