= Deh Pish-e Sofla =

Deh Pish-e Sofla (Persian: ده پيش سفلي), also known as Deh Pish-e Pain, may refer to:

- Deh Pish-e Sofla, Jiroft
- Deh Pish-e Sofla, Kahnuj
