= Kutak-e Vasat =

Village in Kerman province, Iran

Kutak-e Vasat Persian: كوتك وسط
- Village
- Location within Iran
- Coordinates: 27°52′34″N 57°36′01″E
- Country: Iran
- Province: Kerman
- County: Kahnuj
- District: Central
- Rural District: Kutak

Population (2016)
  - Total: 1,041
- Time zone: UTC+3:30 (IRST)

Kutak-e Vasat (Persian: كوتك وسط) (Note: Also romanized as Kūtak-e Vasaṭ) is a village in, and the capital of, Kutak Rural District of the Central District of Kahnuj County, Kerman province, Iran.

== Demographics ==
=== Population ===
At the time of the 2006 National Census, the village's population was 965 in 188 households, when it was in Nakhlestan Rural District. The following census in 2011 counted 1,023 people in 256 households, by which time the village had been transferred to Kutak Rural District created in the district. The 2016 census measured the population of the village as 1,041 people in 281 households.
