= Rumarz =

Rumarz or Rumorz or Roomarz (Persian: رومرز) may refer to:

- Rumarz-e Olya
- Rumarz-e Sofla
