= Sohran-e Sofla =

Sohran-e Sofla سهران سفلي
- Village
- Location within Iran
- Coordinates: 28°07′19″N 57°50′42″E
- Country: Iran
- Province: Kerman
- County: Kahnuj
- Bakhsh: Central
- Rural District: Nakhlestan

Population (2006)
  - Total: 180
- Time zone: UTC+3:30 (IRST)
  - Summer (DST): UTC+4:30 (IRDT)

Sohran-e Sofla (Persian: سهران سفلي, also Romanized as Sohrān-e Soflá; also known as Pā’īn Sahrān, Pa’īn Sahrūn, Pā’īn Sohrūn, Sohrān, Sohrān-e Pā’īn, Sohrūn-e Pā’īn (Persian: سهرون پايين), and Sohrūn) is a village in Nakhlestan Rural District, in the Central District of Kahnuj County, Kerman Province, Iran. At the 2006 census, its population was 180, in 39 families.
