= Golestan, Kahnuj =

Village in Kerman province, Iran

Golestan Persian: گلستان
- Village
- Location within Iran
- Coordinates: 27°55′55″N 57°40′32″E
- Country: Iran
- Province: Kerman
- County: Kahnuj
- District: Central
- Rural District: Nakhlestan

Population (2016)
  - Total: 1,221
- Time zone: UTC+3:30 (IRST)

Golestan (Persian: گلستان) (Note: Also romanized as Golestān) is a village in Nakhlestan Rural District of the Central District of Kahnuj County, Kerman province, Iran.

== Demographics ==
=== Population ===
At the time of the 2006 National Census, the village's population was 739 in 150 households. The following census in 2011 counted 855 people in 225 households. The 2016 census measured the population of the village as 1,221 people in 311 households. It was the most populous village in its rural district.
