= Chah Morid =

City in Kerman province, Iran

Chah Morid Persian: چاه مريد
- City
- Location within Iran
- Coordinates: 27°56′26″N 57°33′12″E
- Country: Iran
- Province: Kerman
- County: Kahnuj
- District: Chah Morid

Population (2016)
  - Total: 1,362
- Time zone: UTC+3:30 (IRST)

Chah Morid (Persian: چاه مريد) (Note: Also romanized as Chāh Morīd) is a city in, and the capital of, Chah Morid District of Kahnuj County, Kerman province, Iran. It also serves as the administrative center for Chah Rigan Rural District.

== Demographics ==
=== Population ===
At the time of the 2006 National Census, Chah Morid's population was 1,625 in 353 households, when it was a village in Howmeh Rural District of the Central District. The following census in 2011 counted 1,291 people in 313 households, by which time the rural district had been separated from the district in the formation of Chah Morid District. The village was transferred to Chah Rigan Rural District created in the new district. The 2016 census measured the population of the city as 1,362 people in 374 households. It was the most populous village in its rural district.

After the census, Chah Morid was elevated to the status of a city.
