= Nurabad-e Do =

Nurabad-e Do نور آباد2
- Village
- Location within Iran
- Coordinates: 28°07′20″N 57°54′06″E
- Country: Iran
- Province: Kerman
- County: Kahnuj
- Bakhsh: Central
- Rural District: Nakhlestan

Population (2006)
  - Total: 10
- Time zone: UTC+3:30 (IRST)
  - Summer (DST): UTC+4:30 (IRDT)

Nurabad-e Do (Persian: نور آباد2, also Romanized as Nūrābād-e Do; also known as Nūrābād) is a village in Nakhlestan Rural District, in the Central District of Kahnuj County, Kerman Province, Iran. At the 2006 census, its population was 10, in 4 families.
