= Sangshekan =

Sangshekan سنگ شكن
- Village
- Location within Iran
- Coordinates: 27°30′32″N 57°32′31″E
- Country: Iran
- Province: Kerman
- County: Manujan
- Bakhsh: Aseminun
- Rural District: Deh Kahan

Population (2006)
  - Total: 245
- Time zone: UTC+3:30 (IRST)
  - Summer (DST): UTC+4:30 (IRDT)

Sangshekan (Persian: سنگ شكن) is a village in Deh Kahan Rural District, Aseminun District, Manujan County, Kerman Province, Iran. At the 2006 census, its population was 245, in 49 families.
