= Bargah-e Olya =

Village in Kerman province, Iran

Bargah-e Olya Persian: بارگاه علیا
- Village
- Location within Iran
- Coordinates: 27°38′18″N 57°39′19″E
- Country: Iran
- Province: Kerman
- County: Kahnuj
- District: Central
- Rural District: Dehkahan

Population (2016)
  - Total: 355
- Time zone: UTC+3:30 (IRST)

Bargah-e Olya (Persian: بارگاه علیا) (Note: Also romanized as Bārgāh-e Olyā; formerly Bargah, also romanized as Bāregāh and Bārgāh) is a village in, and the capital of, Dehkahan Rural District of the Central District, Kahnuj County, Kerman province, Iran.

== Demographics ==
=== Population ===
At the time of the 2006 National Census, the village's population was 759 in 151 households, when it was in Central District of Kahnuj County. The following census in 2011 counted 488 people in 123 households, by which time the rural district had been separated from the county to join the Central District of Kahnuj County. The 2016 census measured the population of the village as 355 people in 108 households.
