= Deh Pish-e Olya, Kahnuj =

Deh Pish-e Olya ده پيش عليا
- Village
- Location within Iran
- Coordinates: 28°06′26″N 57°51′33″E
- Country: Iran
- Province: Kerman
- County: Kahnuj
- Bakhsh: Central
- Rural District: Nakhlestan

Population (2006)
  - Total: 576
- Time zone: UTC+3:30 (IRST)
  - Summer (DST): UTC+4:30 (IRDT)

Deh Pish-e Olya (Persian: ده پيش عليا, also Romanized as Deh Pīsh-e ‘Olyā; also known as Deh Pīsh and Deh Pīsh-e Bālā) is a village in Nakhlestan Rural District, in the Central District of Kahnuj County, Kerman Province, Iran. At the 2006 census, its population was 576, in 107 families.
