= Charmil =

Charmil چرميل
- Village
- Location within Iran
- Coordinates: 27°34′18″N 57°35′59″E
- Country: Iran
- Province: Kerman
- County: Manujan
- Bakhsh: Aseminun
- Rural District: Deh Kahan

Population (2006)
  - Total: 68
- Time zone: UTC+3:30 (IRST)
  - Summer (DST): UTC+4:30 (IRDT)

Charmil (Persian: چرميل, also Romanized as Charmīl) is a village in Deh Kahan Rural District, Aseminun District, Manujan County, Kerman Province, Iran. At the 2006 census, its population was 68, in 15 families.
