= Shadab =

Shadab or Shadaab may refer to:

== People ==
- Shadaab Faridi, Indian singer
- Shadab Zeest Hashmi (born 1972), Pakistani poet
- Shadab Iftikhar, English footballer manager
- Shadab Jakati (born 1980), Indian cricketer
- Shadab Kabir (born 1977), Pakistani cricketer
- Shadab Kamal (born 1987), Indian actor
- Shadab Khan (born 1998), Pakistani cricketer
- Shadaab Khan (born 1973), Indian actor
- Shadab Majeed (born 1997), Pakistani cricketer
- Shadab Nazar (born 1987), Indian cricketer
- Shadab Rayeen (born 1980), Indian sound engineer

== Places ==
- Shadab, Fars, a village in Fars Province, Iran
- Shadab, Kahnuj, a village in Kerman Province, Iran
- Shadab, Razavi Khorasan, a village in Razavi Khorasan Province, Iran
