= Deh Pish-e Sofla, Kahnuj =

Deh Pish-e Sofla ده پيش سفلي
- Village
- Location within Iran
- Coordinates: 28°06′30″N 57°49′56″E
- Country: Iran
- Province: Kerman
- County: Kahnuj
- Bakhsh: Central
- Rural District: Nakhlestan

Population (2006)
  - Total: 473
- Time zone: UTC+3:30 (IRST)
  - Summer (DST): UTC+4:30 (IRDT)

Deh Pish-e Sofla (Persian: ده پيش سفلي, also Romanized as Deh Pīsh-e Soflá and Deh Pish Sofla; also known as Deh Pīsh, Deh Pīsh-e Pā’īn, Deh Pish Vosta, and Shahrak-e Deh Pīsh) is a village in Nakhlestan Rural District, in the Central District of Kahnuj County, Kerman Province, Iran. At the 2006 census, its population was 473, in 89 families.
