= Deh-e Segi =

Deh-e Segi ده سگي
- Village
- Location within Iran
- Coordinates: 27°36′12″N 57°38′03″E
- Country: Iran
- Province: Kerman
- County: Manujan
- Bakhsh: Aseminun
- Rural District: Deh Kahan

Population (2006)
  - Total: 184
- Time zone: UTC+3:30 (IRST)
  - Summer (DST): UTC+4:30 (IRDT)

Deh-e Segi (Persian: ده سگي, also Romanized as Deh-e Segī; also known as Deysegī) is a village in Deh Kahan Rural District, Aseminun District, Manujan County, Kerman Province, Iran. At the 2006 census, its population was 184, in 42 families.
