= Sohran =

Sohran may refer to:

- Soran Emirate
- Sohran, Iran (disambiguation)
