= Do Boneh, Kerman =

Village in Kerman province, Iran

Do Boneh Persian: دوبنه
- Village
- Location within Iran
- Coordinates: 28°34′06″N 57°47′34″E
- Country: Iran
- Province: Kerman
- County: Jiroft
- District: Central
- Rural District: Eslamabad

Population (2016)
  - Total: 3,217
- Time zone: UTC+3:30 (IRST)

Do Boneh (Persian: دوبنه) (Note: Also romanized as Dowbeneh; also known as Dārū Boneh and Dāvar Boneh) is a village in Eslamabad Rural District of the Central District of Jiroft County, Kerman province, Iran.

== Demographics ==
=== Population ===
At the time of the 2006 National Census, the village's population was 1,732 in 334 households. The following census in 2011 counted 2,692 people in 720 households. The 2016 census measured the population of the village as 3,217 people in 833 households. It was the most populous village in its rural district.
