= Mehroyeh Wildlife Refuge =

Wildlife refuge in Kerman Province, Iran

Coordinates: 28°7′34″N 57°27′7″E

Mehroyeh Wildlife Refuge is a wildlife refuge in Kerman Province, Iran. It is located roughly 32 kilometres (20 mi) north-west of Kahnooj, along Road 92.
