= Dehkahan =

City in Kerman province, Iran

Dehkahan Persian: ده‌كهان
- City
- Location within Iran
- Coordinates: 27°41′41″N 57°31′57″E
- Country: Iran
- Province: Kerman
- County: Kahnuj
- District: Central

Population (2016)
  - Total: 3,787
- Time zone: UTC+3:30 (IRST)

Dehkahan (Persian: ده كهان) (Note: Also romanized as Deh Kahan, Deh Kahān and Deh-e Kahān; also known as Deh Kahn, Deh Kahnū, Deh Kehnu, and Deh-e Kāhn) is a city in the Central District of Kahnuj County, Kerman province, Iran.

== Demographics ==
=== Population ===
At the time of the 2006 National Census, Dehkahan's population was 1,103 in 235 households, when it was a village in Dehkahan Rural District of Aseminun District, Manujan County. The following census in 2011 counted 4,505 people in 1,114 households, by which time the rural district had been separated from the county to join the Central District. The 2016 census measured the population of the village as 3,787 people in 1,105 households. It was the most populous village in its rural district.

After the census, the village of Dehkahan was elevated to the status of a city.
