= Kahnuj =

City in Kerman province, Iran

Kahnuj Persian: کهنوج
- City
- Location within Iran
- Coordinates: 27°56′26″N 57°41′57″E
- Country: Iran
- Province: Kerman
- County: Kahnuj
- District: Central

Population (2016)
  - Total: 52,624
- Time zone: UTC+3:30 (IRST)

Kahnuj (Persian: کهنوج) (Note: Also romanized as Kahnūj) is a city in the Central District of Kahnuj County, Kerman province, Iran, serving as capital of both the county and the district. To the northwest is Mehroyeh Wildlife Refuge.

== Demographics ==
=== Population ===
At the time of the 2006 National Census, the city's population was 38,571 in 8,278 households. The following census in 2011 counted 43,977 people in 10,718 households. The 2016 census measured the population of the city as 52,624 people in 14,394 households.

== Geography ==
=== Location ===
The southernmost part of the province is where the county of Kahnuj is situated. Jiroft County to the north, Hormozgan Province to the west and south, Jazmourian and Sistan-Baluchestan regions to the east, and Hormozgan Province to the west and south.

=== Overview ===
The elevation of Kahnuj is 5.5 meters above sea level. The Beshagard Mountains, a section of the Zagros Mountains that extend towards Jazmourian and divide Kahnuj from Hormozgan Province, are situated in this county's mountainous region. In general, Kahnuj has a hot climate. Although precipitation is rare, it can occasionally take the form of torrential rain.

The only continuously flowing river in this county flows in the north and is called the Helil River. The Komsafid River, which rises in the Beshagard Mountains, is one of the seasonal rivers and descends into the Chaleh Chah Reza cavern

The unfavorable climate and neglect of agriculture have resulted in a low population in this county. However, there has been a slight increase in population and a decline in migration recently, thanks to the improvement of health, cultural, and economic conditions as well as the development of agricultural facilities. After Iran's Islamic Revolution, the Jihad-e Sazandegi (Construction Jihad), in particular, attracted the attention of officials, and effective measures were taken to improve the region's economic situation. With its rich soils and nearby underground water sources, Kahnuj County is ideal for farming and raising livestock.

=== Climate ===
Kahnuj has a hot desert climate (BWh) in the Köppen climate classification.

Climate data for Kahnuj (1991–2020)
Month	Jan	Feb	Mar	Apr	May	Jun	Jul	Aug	Sep	Oct	Nov	Dec	Year
Record high °C (°F)	28.7 (83.7)	33.7 (92.7)	40.4 (104.7)	44.0 (111.2)	49.0 (120.2)	49.3 (120.7)	49.6 (121.3)	48.4 (119.1)	47.0 (116.6)	43.0 (109.4)	36.2 (97.2)	32.8 (91.0)	49.6 (121.3)
Mean daily maximum °C (°F)	20.3 (68.5)	23.3 (73.9)	28.0 (82.4)	34.9 (94.8)	41.0 (105.8)	44.2 (111.6)	44.2 (111.6)	43.1 (109.6)	40.6 (105.1)	36.0 (96.8)	28.5 (83.3)	23.0 (73.4)	33.9 (93.0)
Daily mean °C (°F)	14.0 (57.2)	16.9 (62.4)	21.1 (70.0)	27.6 (81.7)	33.5 (92.3)	36.8 (98.2)	36.9 (98.4)	35.8 (96.4)	33.1 (91.6)	28.3 (82.9)	21.1 (70.0)	15.7 (60.3)	26.7 (80.1)
Mean daily minimum °C (°F)	8.6 (47.5)	11.3 (52.3)	15.0 (59.0)	20.3 (68.5)	25.4 (77.7)	29.1 (84.4)	30.5 (86.9)	29.2 (84.6)	26.0 (78.8)	20.8 (69.4)	14.5 (58.1)	9.4 (48.9)	20.0 (68.0)
Record low °C (°F)	−2.2 (28.0)	−1.4 (29.5)	4.4 (39.9)	10.5 (50.9)	17.0 (62.6)	21.2 (70.2)	21.6 (70.9)	20.8 (69.4)	16.5 (61.7)	9.6 (49.3)	2.5 (36.5)	−2.4 (27.7)	−2.4 (27.7)
Average precipitation mm (inches)	49.1 (1.93)	38.4 (1.51)	41.1 (1.62)	6.3 (0.25)	1.8 (0.07)	3.3 (0.13)	2.6 (0.10)	7.4 (0.29)	1.3 (0.05)	3.3 (0.13)	6.3 (0.25)	29.8 (1.17)	190.7 (7.51)
Average precipitation days (≥ 1.0 mm)	3.8	3.3	3.3	0.9	0.5	0.5	0.5	0.6	0.3	0.4	1.0	2.1	17.2
Average relative humidity (%)	58	53	46	33	27	26	32	34	33	33	42	50	38.9
Average dew point °C (°F)	5.2 (41.4)	6.5 (43.7)	7.6 (45.7)	8.3 (46.9)	10.2 (50.4)	12.6 (54.7)	16.2 (61.2)	15.8 (60.4)	12.9 (55.2)	8.9 (48.0)	6.5 (43.7)	4.2 (39.6)	9.6 (49.2)
Mean monthly sunshine hours	228	221	246	279	327	325	313	311	295	297	260	242	3,344
Source: NOAA NCEI

Climate data for Kahnuj 470m (1989–2010)
Month	Jan	Feb	Mar	Apr	May	Jun	Jul	Aug	Sep	Oct	Nov	Dec	Year
Mean daily maximum °C (°F)	19.8 (67.6)	23.3 (73.9)	28.1 (82.6)	35.0 (95.0)	41.1 (106.0)	44.1 (111.4)	44.0 (111.2)	42.9 (109.2)	40.3 (104.5)	36.1 (97.0)	28.9 (84.0)	22.8 (73.0)	33.9 (93.0)
Daily mean °C (°F)	14.2 (57.6)	17.3 (63.1)	21.5 (70.7)	27.5 (81.5)	33.2 (91.8)	36.5 (97.7)	37.1 (98.8)	35.9 (96.6)	33.1 (91.6)	28.4 (83.1)	21.8 (71.2)	16.3 (61.3)	26.9 (80.4)
Mean daily minimum °C (°F)	8.6 (47.5)	11.3 (52.3)	14.8 (58.6)	20.0 (68.0)	25.3 (77.5)	28.8 (83.8)	30.2 (86.4)	29.0 (84.2)	25.8 (78.4)	20.7 (69.3)	14.7 (58.5)	9.8 (49.6)	19.9 (67.8)
Average precipitation mm (inches)	53.3 (2.10)	40.9 (1.61)	32.6 (1.28)	4.4 (0.17)	0.8 (0.03)	4.3 (0.17)	2.7 (0.11)	9.4 (0.37)	1.5 (0.06)	3.4 (0.13)	4.2 (0.17)	36.0 (1.42)	193.5 (7.62)
Average precipitation days (≥ 1.0 mm)	4.3	3.4	3.2	0.9	0.3	0.7	0.5	0.7	0.3	0.3	0.7	2.5	17.8
Average relative humidity (%)	59	53	45	32	27	27	33	36	35	33	42	53	39
Mean monthly sunshine hours	219.9	221.7	246.9	281.2	326.9	323.1	313.2	306.1	294.8	299.2	262.5	232.7	3,328.2
Source: Iran Meteorological Organization (temperatures), (precipitation), (humidity), (days with precipitation), (sunshine)
