= Nurobod =

Nurobod may refer to:

- Nurobod, Uzbekistan, a city in Samarqand Region
- Nurobod, Tashkent Region, a town in Tashkent Region
- Nurobod District, Uzbekistan
- Nurobod District, Tajikistan

== See also ==
- Nurabad (disambiguation)
