= Rumarz-e Olya =

Rumarz-e Olya رومرزعليا
- Village
- Location within Iran
- Coordinates: 28°30′12″N 57°46′45″E
- Country: Iran
- Province: Kerman
- County: Jiroft
- Bakhsh: Central
- Rural District: Eslamabad

Population (2006)
  - Total: 806
- Time zone: UTC+3:30 (IRST)
  - Summer (DST): UTC+4:30 (IRDT)

Rumarz-e Olya (Persian: رومرزعليا, also Romanized as Rūmarz-e ‘Olyā and Rūmorz-e ‘Olyā; also known as Roomarz, Rūmārz Bālā, Rūmarz-e Bālā, and Rūmorz-e Bālā) is a village in Eslamabad Rural District, in the Central District of Jiroft County, Kerman Province, Iran. At the 2006 census, its population was 806, in 161 families.
