= Rumarz-e Sofla =

Rumarz-e Sofla رومرزسفلي
- Village
- Location within Iran
- Coordinates: 28°29′25″N 57°46′55″E
- Country: Iran
- Province: Kerman
- County: Jiroft
- Bakhsh: Central
- Rural District: Eslamabad

Population (2006)
  - Total: 234
- Time zone: UTC+3:30 (IRST)
  - Summer (DST): UTC+4:30 (IRDT)

Rumarz-e Sofla (Persian: رومرزسفلي, also Romanized as Rūmarz-e Soflá; also known as Rūmaz-e Soflá and Rūmorz-e Pā’īn) is a village in Eslamabad Rural District, in the Central District of Jiroft County, Kerman Province, Iran. At the 2006 census, its population was 234, in 47 families.
