= Moradabad, Jiroft =

Moradabad مراداباد
- Village
- Location within Iran
- Coordinates: 28°32′07″N 57°46′40″E
- Country: Iran
- Province: Kerman
- County: Jiroft
- Bakhsh: Central
- Rural District: Eslamabad

Population (2006)
  - Total: 160
- Time zone: UTC+3:30 (IRST)
  - Summer (DST): UTC+4:30 (IRDT)

Moradabad (Persian: مراداباد, also Romanized as Morādābād; also known as Kahūrābād) is a village in Eslamabad Rural District, in the Central District of Jiroft County, Kerman Province, Iran. At the 2006 census, its population was 160, in 30 families.
