= Kutak Rural District =

Rural district in Kerman province, Iran

Kutak Rural District Persian: دهستان کوتک
- Rural District
- Location within Iran
- Coordinates: 27°52′14″N 57°42′53″E
- Country: Iran
- Province: Kerman
- County: Kahnuj
- District: Central
- Capital: Kutak-e Vasat

Population (2016)
  - Total: 8,320
- Time zone: UTC+3:30 (IRST)

Kutak Rural District (Persian: دهستان کوتک) is in the Central District of Kahnuj County, Kerman province, Iran. Its capital is the village of Kutak-e Vasat.

== History ==
Kutak Rural District was created in the Central District after the 2006 National Census.

== Demographics ==
=== Population ===
At the time of the 2011 census, the rural district's population was 8,768 in 2,104 households. The 2016 census measured the population of the rural district as 8,320 in 2,238 households. The most populous of its 56 villages was Kutak-e Pain, with 1,180 people.
