= Tajabad-e Yek, Bardsir =

Tajabad-e Yek تاج آباد1
- Village
- Location within Iran
- Coordinates: 29°54′03″N 56°41′07″E
- Country: Iran
- Province: Kerman
- County: Bardsir
- Bakhsh: Central
- Rural District: Mashiz

Population (2006)
  - Total: 52
- Time zone: UTC+3:30 (IRST)
  - Summer (DST): UTC+4:30 (IRDT)

Tajabad-e Yek (Persian: تاج آباد1, also Romanized as Tājābād-e Yek; also known as Tājābād) is a village in Mashiz Rural District, in the Central District of Bardsir County, Kerman Province, Iran. At the 2006 census, its population was 52, in 11 families.
