= Sharikabad-e Mokhtar Abbaslu =

Sharikabad-e Mokhtar Abbaslu شريك ابادمختارعباسلو
- Village
- Location within Iran
- Coordinates: 28°57′04″N 55°48′55″E
- Country: Iran
- Province: Kerman
- County: Sirjan
- Bakhsh: Central
- Rural District: Golestan

Population (2006)
  - Total: 96
- Time zone: UTC+3:30 (IRST)
  - Summer (DST): UTC+4:30 (IRDT)

Sharikabad-e Mokhtar Abbaslu (Persian: شريك ابادمختارعباسلو, also Romanized as Sharīkābād-e Mokhtār ʿAbbāslū; also known as Sharīkābād-e Mokhtār) is a village in Golestan Rural District, in the Central District of Sirjan County, Kerman Province, Iran. At the 2006 census, its population was 96, in 23 families.
