= Suragabad, Sorkh Qaleh =

Suragabad سورگ اباد
- Village
- Location within Iran
- Coordinates: 27°50′26″N 57°58′00″E
- Country: Iran
- Province: Kerman
- County: Qaleh Ganj
- Bakhsh: Central
- Rural District: Sorkh Qaleh

Population (2006)
  - Total: 534
- Time zone: UTC+3:30 (IRST)
  - Summer (DST): UTC+4:30 (IRDT)

Suragabad (Persian: سورگ اباد, also Romanized as Sūragābād; also known as Sūregābād-e Chalpaee) is a village in Sorkh Qaleh Rural District, in the Central District of Qaleh Ganj County, Kerman Province, Iran. At the 2006 census, its population was 534, in 107 families.
