= Kutak, Hajjiabad =

Kutak كوتك
- Village
- Location within Iran
- Coordinates: 27°55′09″N 56°49′22″E
- Country: Iran
- Province: Hormozgan
- County: Hajjiabad
- Bakhsh: Ahmadi
- Rural District: Ahmadi

Population (2006)
  - Total: 39
- Time zone: UTC+3:30 (IRST)
  - Summer (DST): UTC+4:30 (IRDT)

Kutak (Persian: كوتك, also Romanized as Kūtak) is a village in Ahmadi Rural District, Ahmadi District, Hajjiabad County, Hormozgan Province, Iran. At the 2006 census, its population was 39, in 9 families.
