= Kahurabad, Anbarabad =

Kahurabad كهوراباد
- Village
- Location within Iran
- Coordinates: 28°16′45″N 57°39′48″E
- Country: Iran
- Province: Kerman
- County: Anbarabad
- Bakhsh: Esmaili
- Rural District: Ganjabad

Population (2006)
  - Total: 303
- Time zone: UTC+3:30 (IRST)
  - Summer (DST): UTC+4:30 (IRDT)

Kahurabad (Persian: كهوراباد, also Romanized as Kahūrābād and Kehūrābād) is a village in Ganjabad Rural District, Esmaili District, Anbarabad County, Kerman Province, Iran. At the 2006 census, its population was 303, in 61 families.
