= Bargah, East Azerbaijan =

Bargah بارگاه
- Village
- Location within Iran
- Coordinates: 37°11′33″N 47°21′57″E
- Country: Iran
- Province: East Azerbaijan
- County: Charuymaq
- Bakhsh: Shadian
- Rural District: Charuymaq-e Sharqi

Population (2006)
  - Total: 187
- Time zone: UTC+3:30 (IRST)
  - Summer (DST): UTC+4:30 (IRDT)

Bargah (Persian: بارگاه, also Romanized as Bārgāh) is a village in Charuymaq-e Sharqi Rural District, Shadian District, Charuymaq County, East Azerbaijan Province, Iran. At the 2006 census, its population was 187, in 34 families.
