= Nurabad Rural District =

Nurabad Rural District (Persian: دهستان نورآباد) may refer to:

- Nurabad Rural District (Mobarakeh County), Isfahan Province
- Nurabad Rural District (Manujan County), Kerman Province
- Nurabad Rural District (Delfan County), Lorestan Province
