= Nurabad-e Nadar =

Nurabad-e Nadar نورابادندر
- Village
- Location within Iran
- Coordinates: 33°50′47″N 48°15′47″E
- Country: Iran
- Province: Lorestan
- County: Selseleh
- Bakhsh: Central
- Rural District: Qaleh-ye Mozaffari

Population (2006)
  - Total: 95
- Time zone: UTC+3:30 (IRST)
  - Summer (DST): UTC+4:30 (IRDT)

Nurabad-e Nadar (Persian: نورابادندر, also Romanized as Nūrābād-e Nadar) is a village in Qaleh-ye Mozaffari Rural District, in the Central District of Selseleh County, Lorestan Province, Iran. At the 2006 census, its population was 95, in 32 families.
