= Tajabad-e Olya =

Tajabad-e Olya تاج ابادعليا
- Village
- Location within Iran
- Coordinates: 28°07′05″N 58°01′03″E
- Country: Iran
- Province: Kerman
- County: Rudbar-e Jonubi
- Bakhsh: Central
- Rural District: Rudbar

Population (2006)
  - Total: 235
- Time zone: UTC+3:30 (IRST)
  - Summer (DST): UTC+4:30 (IRDT)

Tajabad-e Olya (Persian: تاج ابادعليا, also Romanized as Tājābād-e ‘Olyā; also known as Tājābād and Tājābād-e Bālā) is a village in Rudbar Rural District, in the Central District of Rudbar-e Jonubi County, Kerman Province, Iran. At the 2006 census, its population was 235, in 49 families.
