= Khardeh-ye Dehqan =

Khardeh-ye Dehqan خرده دهقان
- Village
- Location within Iran
- Coordinates: 30°30′38″N 57°11′06″E
- Country: Iran
- Province: Kerman
- County: Kerman
- Bakhsh: Central
- Rural District: Derakhtengan

Population (2006)
  - Total: 36
- Time zone: UTC+3:30 (IRST)
  - Summer (DST): UTC+4:30 (IRDT)

Khardeh-ye Dehqan (Persian: خرده دهقان, also Romanized as Khardeh-ye Dehqān; also known as Khar Dehqān, Khūr Dehgān, Khūr Dehqān, Khūr-e Dehgān, and Tājābād) is a village in Derakhtengan Rural District, in the Central District of Kerman County, Kerman Province, Iran. At the 2006 census, its population was 36, in 20 families.
