= Deh Pish-e Olya, Jiroft =

Village in Kerman, Iran

Deh Pish-e Olya ده پيش عليا
- Village
- Location within Iran
- Coordinates: 28°35′36″N 57°45′45″E
- Country: Iran
- Province: Kerman
- County: Jiroft
- Bakhsh: Central
- Rural District: Eslamabad

Population (2006)
  - Total: 583
- Time zone: UTC+3:30 (IRST)
  - Summer (DST): UTC+4:30 (IRDT)

Deh Pish-e Olya (Persian: ده پيش عليا, also Romanized as Deh Pīsh-e ‘Olyā; also known as Deh-e Pīsh Bālā, Deh-e Pīsh-e Bālā, and Deh Pīsh-e Bālā) is a village in Eslamabad Rural District, in the Central District of Jiroft County, Kerman Province, Iran. At the 2006 census, its population was 583, in 110 families.
