= Tajabad-e Kohneh =

Tajabad-e Kohneh تاج ابادكهنه
- Village
- Location within Iran
- Coordinates: 30°27′15″N 55°58′51″E
- Country: Iran
- Province: Kerman
- County: Rafsanjan
- Bakhsh: Central
- Rural District: Azadegan

Population (2006)
  - Total: 949
- Time zone: UTC+3:30 (IRST)
  - Summer (DST): UTC+4:30 (IRDT)

Tajabad-e Kohneh (Persian: تاج ابادكهنه, also Romanized as Tājābād-e Kohneh; also known as Tājābād) is a village in Azadegan Rural District, in the Central District of Rafsanjan County, Kerman Province, Iran. At the 2006 census, its population was 949, in 237 families.
