= Tazehabad-e Sar Dalan =

Tazehabad-e Sar Dalan تازه آباد سردالان
- Village
- Location within Iran
- Coordinates: 35°55′15″N 47°10′48″E
- Country: Iran
- Province: Kurdistan
- County: Divandarreh
- Bakhsh: Central
- Rural District: Howmeh

Population (2006)
  - Total: 144
- Time zone: UTC+3:30 (IRST)
  - Summer (DST): UTC+4:30 (IRDT)

Tazehabad-e Sar Dalan (Persian: تازه آباد سردالان, also Romanized as Tāzehābād-e Sar Dālān; also known as Tājābād) is a village in Howmeh Rural District, in the Central District of Divandarreh County, Kurdistan Province, Iran. At the 2006 census, its population was 144, in 26 families. The village is populated by Kurds.
