= Sharikabad, Sirjan =

Sharikabad شريك اباد
- Village
- Location within Iran
- Coordinates: 28°56′48″N 55°48′55″E
- Country: Iran
- Province: Kerman
- County: Sirjan
- Bakhsh: Central
- Rural District: Golestan

Population (2006)
  - Total: 160
- Time zone: UTC+3:30 (IRST)
  - Summer (DST): UTC+4:30 (IRDT)

Sharikabad (Persian: شريك اباد, also Romanized as Sharīkābād; also known as Mokhtār) is a village in Golestan Rural District, in the Central District of Sirjan County, Kerman Province, Iran. At the 2006 census, its population was 160, in 38 families.
