= Kutak-e Qalat =

Kutak-e Qalat كوتك قلات
- Village
- Location within Iran
- Coordinates: 26°55′51″N 57°08′46″E
- Country: Iran
- Province: Hormozgan
- County: Minab
- Bakhsh: Central
- Rural District: Karian

Population (2006)
  - Total: 95
- Time zone: UTC+3:30 (IRST)
  - Summer (DST): UTC+4:30 (IRDT)

Kutak-e Qalat (Persian: كوتك قلات, also Romanized as Kūtak-e Qalāt; also known as Kūhtak-e Kūchek and Kūh Tak-e Kūchek) is a village in Karian Rural District, in the Central District of Minab County, Hormozgan Province, Iran. At the 2006 census, its population was 95, in 18 families.
