= Kutak-e Rayisi =

Kutak-e Rayisi كوتك رئيسي
- Village
- Location within Iran
- Coordinates: 26°57′06″N 57°08′35″E
- Country: Iran
- Province: Hormozgan
- County: Minab
- Bakhsh: Central
- Rural District: Karian

Population (2006)
  - Total: 100
- Time zone: UTC+3:30 (IRST)
  - Summer (DST): UTC+4:30 (IRDT)

Kutak-e Rayisi (Persian: كوتك رئيسي, also romanized as Kūtak-e Rayīsī; also known as Kūh Tak and Kūtak) is a village in Karian Rural District, in the Central District of Minab County, Hormozgan Province, Iran. At the 2006 census, its population was 100, in 16 families.
