= Nurabad, East Azerbaijan =

Nurabad نوراباد
- Village
- Location within Iran
- Coordinates: 38°36′58″N 45°17′02″E
- Country: Iran
- Province: East Azerbaijan
- County: Marand
- Bakhsh: Central
- Rural District: Koshksaray

Population (2006)
  - Total: 106
- Time zone: UTC+3:30 (IRST)
  - Summer (DST): UTC+4:30 (IRDT)

Nurabad (Persian: نوراباد, also Romanized as Nūrābād and Noor Abad) is a village in Koshksaray Rural District, in the Central District of Marand County, East Azerbaijan Province, Iran. At the 2006 census, its population was 106, in 34 families.
