= Tajabad, Rafsanjan =

Tajabad تاج اباد
- Village
- Location within Iran
- Coordinates: 30°28′24″N 56°00′48″E
- Country: Iran
- Province: Kerman
- County: Rafsanjan
- Bakhsh: Central
- Rural District: Azadegan

Population (2006)
  - Total: 115
- Time zone: UTC+3:30 (IRST)
  - Summer (DST): UTC+4:30 (IRDT)

Tajabad (Persian: تاج اباد, also Romanized as Tājābād; also known as Kafā’īyeh (Persian: كفائيه) and Tājābād-e Now) is a village in Azadegan Rural District, in the Central District of Rafsanjan County, Kerman Province, Iran. At the 2006 census, its population was 115, in 32 families.
