= Sohran, Jask =

Sohran سهران
- Village
- Location within Iran
- Coordinates: 25°52′25″N 57°31′08″E
- Country: Iran
- Province: Hormozgan
- County: Jask
- Bakhsh: Central
- Rural District: Kangan

Population (2006)
  - Total: 128
- Time zone: UTC+3:30 (IRST)
  - Summer (DST): UTC+4:30 (IRDT)

Sohran (Persian: سهران, also Romanized as Sohrān and Sahran) is a village in Kangan Rural District, in the Central District of Jask County, Hormozgan Province, Iran. At the 2006 census, its population was 128, in 26 families.
