= Nurabad, Kharameh =

Nurabad نوراباد
- Village
- Location within Iran
- Coordinates: 29°37′56″N 53°07′43″E
- Country: Iran
- Province: Fars
- County: Kharameh
- Bakhsh: Central
- Rural District: Dehqanan

Population (2006)
  - Total: 144
- Time zone: UTC+3:30 (IRST)
  - Summer (DST): UTC+4:30 (IRDT)

Nurabad (Persian: نوراباد, also Romanized as Nūrābād) is a village in Dehqanan Rural District, in the Central District of Kharameh County, Fars province, Iran. At the 2006 census, its population was 144, in 38 families.
