= Sharikabad, Qaleh Ganj =

Sharikabad شريك اباد
- Village
- Location within Iran
- Coordinates: 27°57′45″N 58°25′09″E
- Country: Iran
- Province: Kerman
- County: Qaleh Ganj
- Bakhsh: Central
- Rural District: Sorkh Qaleh

Population (2006)
  - Total: 299
- Time zone: UTC+3:30 (IRST)

Sharikabad (Persian: شريك اباد, also Romanized as Sharīkābād) is a village in Sorkh Qaleh Rural District, in the Central District of Qaleh Ganj County, Kerman Province, Iran. At the 2006 census, its population was 299, in 54 families.
