= Sharikabad, Chahar Gonbad =

Sharikabad شريك اباد
- Village
- Location within Iran
- Coordinates: 29°37′07″N 56°21′15″E
- Country: Iran
- Province: Kerman
- County: Sirjan
- Bakhsh: Central
- Rural District: Chahar Gonbad

Population (2006)
  - Total: 42
- Time zone: UTC+3:30 (IRST)
  - Summer (DST): UTC+4:30 (IRDT)

Sharikabad (Persian: شريك اباد, also Romanized as Sharīkābād) is a village in Chahar Gonbad Rural District, in the Central District of Sirjan County, Kerman Province, Iran. At the 2006 census, its population was 42, in 12 families.
