= Sahran, Sistan and Baluchestan =

Sohran سهران
- Village
- Location within Iran
- Coordinates: 27°33′18″N 60°48′40″E
- Country: Iran
- Province: Sistan and Baluchestan
- County: Iranshahr
- Bakhsh: Central
- Rural District: Abtar

Population (2006)
  - Total: 37
- Time zone: UTC+3:30 (IRST)

Sahran (Persian: سهران, also Romanized as Sahrān) is a village in Abtar Rural District, in the Central District of Iranshahr County, Sistan and Baluchestan Province, Iran. At the 2006 census, its population was 37, in 6 families.
