= Nurabad, Sonqor =

Nurabad نوراباد
- Village
- Location within Iran
- Coordinates: 34°53′00″N 47°44′54″E
- Country: Iran
- Province: Kermanshah
- County: Sonqor
- Bakhsh: Central
- Rural District: Bavaleh

Population (2006)
  - Total: 165
- Time zone: UTC+3:30 (IRST)
  - Summer (DST): UTC+4:30 (IRDT)

Nurabad (Persian: نوراباد, also Romanized as Nūrābād; also known as Nūrābād-e Bāvaleh) is a village in Bavaleh Rural District, in the Central District of Sonqor County, Kermanshah Province, Iran. At the 2006 census, its population was 165, in 40 families.
