= Kutak-e Jajji Aqa =

Kutak-e Jajji Aqa كوتك جاجي اقا
- Village
- Location within Iran
- Coordinates: 30°40′48″N 50°07′51″E
- Country: Iran
- Province: Khuzestan
- County: Behbahan
- Bakhsh: Central
- Rural District: Dodangeh

Population (2006)
  - Total: 164
- Time zone: UTC+3:30 (IRST)
  - Summer (DST): UTC+4:30 (IRDT)

Kutak-e Jajji Aqa (Persian: كوتك جاجي اقا, also Romanized as Kūtak-e Jājjī Āqā; also known as Kūrtak-e Ḩājj Āqā, Kūtak-e Ḩāj Āqā, and Kūtak-e Ḩājj Āqā) is a village in Dodangeh Rural District, in the Central District of Behbahan County, Khuzestan Province, Iran. At the 2006 census, its population was 164, in 28 families.
