= Nurabad, Chaharmahal and Bakhtiari =

Nurabad نوراباد
- Village
- Location within Iran
- Coordinates: 31°16′29″N 51°07′25″E
- Country: Iran
- Province: Chaharmahal and Bakhtiari
- County: Lordegan
- Bakhsh: Falard
- Rural District: Poshtkuh

Population (2006)
  - Total: 28
- Time zone: UTC+3:30 (IRST)
  - Summer (DST): UTC+4:30 (IRDT)

Nurabad (Persian: نوراباد, also Romanized as Nūrābād; also known as Nūrābād-e Menarjan) is a village in Poshtkuh Rural District, Falard District, Lordegan County, Chaharmahal and Bakhtiari Province, Iran. At the 2006 census, its population was 28, in 5 families. The village is populated by Lurs.
