= Nurabad-e Dasht Abkhan =

Nurabad-e Dasht Abkhvan نوراباددشت ابخوان
- Village
- Country: Iran
- Province: Sistan and Baluchestan
- County: Khash
- Bakhsh: Central
- Rural District: Karvandar

Population (2006)
  - Total: 93
- Time zone: UTC+3:30 (IRST)
  - Summer (DST): UTC+4:30 (IRDT)

Nurabad-e Dasht Abkhvan (Persian: نوراباددشت ابخوان, also Romanized as Nūrābād-e Dasht Ābkhvān) is a village in Karvandar Rural District, in the Central District of Khash County, Sistan and Baluchestan Province, Iran. At the 2006 census, its population was 93, in 20 families.
