= Kutak-e Mohammad Karim =

Kutak-e Mohammad Karim كوتك محمدكريم
- Village
- Location within Iran
- Coordinates: 30°39′50″N 50°07′51″E
- Country: Iran
- Province: Khuzestan
- County: Behbahan
- Bakhsh: Central
- Rural District: Dodangeh

Population (2006)
  - Total: 104
- Time zone: UTC+3:30 (IRST)
  - Summer (DST): UTC+4:30 (IRDT)

Kutak-e Mohammad Karim (Persian: كوتك محمدكريم, also Romanized as Kūtak-e Moḩammad Karīm; also known as Kūtak-e Bālā and Kūtak-e ‘Olyā) is a village in Dodangeh Rural District, in the Central District of Behbahan County, Khuzestan Province, Iran. At the 2006 census, its population was 104, in 22 families.
