= Sharikabad-e Miluiyeh =

Sharikabad-e Miluiyeh شريك ابادميلوييه
- Village
- Location within Iran
- Coordinates: 28°03′31″N 57°03′08″E
- Country: Iran
- Province: Kerman
- County: Faryab
- Bakhsh: Central
- Rural District: Golashkerd

Population (2006)
  - Total: 163
- Time zone: UTC+3:30 (IRST)
  - Summer (DST): UTC+4:30 (IRDT)

Sharikabad-e Miluiyeh (Persian: شريك ابادميلوييه, also Romanized as Sharīkābād-e Mīlūīyeh; also known as Sharīkābād and Sharīkābād-e Mīlūyeh) is a village in Golashkerd Rural District, in the Central District of Faryab County, Kerman Province, Iran. At the 2006 census, its population was 163, in 37 families.
