= Nurabad, Mashhad =

Nurabad نوراباد
- Village
- Location within Iran
- Coordinates: 36°31′56″N 59°25′21″E
- Country: Iran
- Province: Razavi Khorasan
- County: Mashhad
- Bakhsh: Central
- Rural District: Miyan Velayat

Population (2006)
  - Total: 20
- Time zone: UTC+3:30 (IRST)
  - Summer (DST): UTC+4:30 (IRDT)

Nurabad (Persian: نوراباد, also Romanized as Nūrābād) is a village in Miyan Velayat Rural District, in the Central District of Mashhad County, Razavi Khorasan Province, Iran. At the 2006 census, its population was 20, in 5 families.
