= Naluki, Dalgan =

Naluki نلوكي
- Village
- Location within Iran
- Coordinates: 27°04′45″N 59°24′07″E
- Country: Iran
- Province: Sistan and Baluchestan
- County: Dalgan
- Bakhsh: Jolgeh-ye Chah Hashem
- Rural District: Jolgeh-ye Chah Hashem

Population (2006)
  - Total: 280
- Time zone: UTC+3:30 (IRST)
  - Summer (DST): UTC+4:30 (IRDT)

Naluki (Persian: نلوكي, also Romanized as Nalūkī; also known as Nūrābād-e Nalūkī) is a village in Jolgeh-ye Chah Hashem Rural District, Jolgeh-ye Chah Hashem District, Dalgan County, Sistan and Baluchestan Province, Iran. At the 2006 census, its population was 280, in 50 families.
