= Suragabad, Qaleh Ganj =

Suragabad سورگ اباد
- Village
- Location within Iran
- Coordinates: 27°30′15″N 57°54′55″E
- Country: Iran
- Province: Kerman
- County: Qaleh Ganj
- Bakhsh: Central
- Rural District: Qaleh Ganj

Population (2006)
  - Total: 645
- Time zone: UTC+3:30 (IRST)

Suragabad (Persian: سورگ اباد, also Romanized as Sūragābād; also known as Sharīkābād) is a village in Qaleh Ganj Rural District, in the Central District of Qaleh Ganj County, Kerman Province, Iran. At the 2006 census, its population was 645, in 118 families.
