= Deh Pish-e Sofla, Jiroft =

Village in Kerman province, Iran

Deh Pish-e Sofla Persian: ده پیش سفلی
- Village
- Location within Iran
- Coordinates: 28°33′15″N 57°45′53″E
- Country: Iran
- Province: Kerman
- County: Jiroft
- District: Central
- Rural District: Eslamabad

Population (2016)
  - Total: 1,719
- Time zone: UTC+3:30 (IRST)

Deh Pish-e Sofla (Persian: ده پیش سفلی) (Note: Also romanized as Deh Pīsh-e Soflá; also known as Deh-e Pīsh Pā’īn and Deh Pīsh-e Pā’īn) is a village in, and the capital of, Eslamabad Rural District of the Central District of Jiroft County, Kerman province, Iran.

== Demographics ==
=== Population ===
At the time of the 2006 National Census, the village's population was 1,066 in 197 households. The following census in 2011 counted 1,129 people in 290 households. The 2016 census measured the population of the village as 1,719 people in 398 households.
