= Chah Morid District =

District in Kerman province, Iran

Chah Morid District Persian: بخش چاه مرید
- District
- Location within Iran
- Coordinates: 27°57′13″N 57°29′58″E
- Country: Iran
- Province: Kerman
- County: Kahnuj
- Capital: Chah Morid

Population (2016)
  - Total: 11,245
- Time zone: UTC+3:30 (IRST)

Chah Morid District (Persian: بخش چاه مرید) is in Kahnuj County, Kerman province, Iran. Its capital is the city of Chah Morid.

== History ==
After the 2006 National Census, Howmeh Rural District was separated from the Central District in the establishment of Chah Morid District, which was divided into two rural districts, including the new Chah Rigan Rural District. After the 2016 census, the village of Chah Morid was elevated to the status of a city.

== Demographics ==
=== Population ===
At the time of the 2011 census, the district's population was 11,226 people in 2,776 households. The 2016 census measured the population of the district as 11,245 inhabitants in 3,069 households.

Chah Morid District Population
Administrative Divisions	2011	2016
Chah Rigan RD	5,791	6,013
Howmeh RD	5,435	5,232
Chah Morid (city) (Note: Became a city after the 2016 census)		
Total	11,226	11,245
RD = Rural District
