= Eslamabad Rural District (Jiroft County) =

Rural district in Kerman province, Iran

Eslamabad Rural District Persian: دهستان اسلام آباد
- Rural District
- Location within Iran
- Coordinates: 28°32′14″N 57°44′51″E
- Country: Iran
- Province: Kerman
- County: Jiroft
- District: Central
- Capital: Deh Pish-e Sofla

Population (2016)
  - Total: 16,424
- Time zone: UTC+3:30 (IRST)

Eslamabad Rural District (Persian: دهستان اسلام آباد) is in the Central District of Jiroft County, Kerman province, Iran. Its capital is the village of Deh Pish-e Sofla.

== Demographics ==
=== Population ===
At the time of the 2006 National Census, the rural district's population was 11,289 in 2,314 households. There were 13,960 inhabitants in 3,633 households at the following census of 2011. The 2016 census measured the population of the rural district as 16,424 in 4,407 households. The most populous of its 33 villages was Do Boneh, with 3,217 people.
