= Dehkahan Rural District =

Rural district in Kerman province, Iran

Dehkahan Rural District Persian: دهستان ده كهان
- Rural District
- Location within Iran
- Coordinates: 27°42′21″N 57°38′42″E
- Country: Iran
- Province: Kerman
- County: Kahnuj
- District: Central
- Capital: Bargah-e Olya

Population (2016)
  - Total: 7,397
- Time zone: UTC+3:30 (IRST)

Dehkahan Rural District (Persian: دهستان ده كهان) is in the Central District of Kahnuj County, Kerman province, Iran. Its capital is the village of Bargah-e Olya. (Note: Formerly Bargah)

== Demographics ==
=== Population ===
At the time of the 2006 National Census, the rural district's population (as a part of Aseminun District of Manujan County) was 9,476 in 2,014 households. There were 7,980 inhabitants in 2,004 households at the following census of 2011, by which time the rural district had been separated from the county to join the Central District. The 2016 census measured the population of the rural district as 7,397 in 2,107 households. The most populous of its 29 villages was Dehkahan (now a city), with 3,787 people.
