= Howmeh Rural District (Kahnuj County) =

Rural district in Kerman province, Iran

Howmeh Rural District Persian: دهستان حومه
- Rural District
- Location within Iran
- Coordinates: 27°57′N 57°26′E
- Country: Iran
- Province: Kerman
- County: Kahnuj
- District: Chah Morid
- Capital: Chah Hajji

Population (2016)
  - Total: 5,232
- Time zone: UTC+3:30 (IRST)

Howmeh Rural District (Persian: دهستان حومه) is in the Chah Morid District of Kahnuj County, Kerman province, Iran. Its capital is the village of Chah Hajji.

== Demographics ==
=== Population ===
At the time of the 2006 National Census, the rural district's population (as a part of the Central District) was 10,491 in 2,180 households. There were 5,435 inhabitants in 1,335 households at the following census of 2011, by which time the rural district had been separated from the district in the establishment of Chah Morid District. The 2016 census measured the population of the rural district as 5,232 in 1,430 households. The most populous of its 24 villages was Deh-e Hut, with 1,198 people.
