= Nakhlestan Rural District (Kahnuj County) =

Rural district in Kerman province, Iran

Nakhlestan Rural District Persian: دهستان نخلستان
- Rural District
- Location within Iran
- Coordinates: 28°03′40″N 57°45′53″E
- Country: Iran
- Province: Kerman
- County: Kahnuj
- District: Central
- Capital: Zeh

Population (2016)
  - Total: 16,262
- Time zone: UTC+3:30 (IRST)

Nakhlestan Rural District (Persian: دهستان نخلستان) is in the Central District of Kahnuj County, Kerman province, Iran. Its capital is the village of Zeh.

== Demographics ==
=== Population ===
At the time of the 2006 National Census, the rural district's population was 21,602 in 4,571 households. There were 14,339 inhabitants in 3,587 households at the following census of 2011. The 2016 census measured the population of the rural district as 16,262 in 4,468 households. The most populous of its 59 villages was Golestan, with 1,221 people.
