= Kahnuj County =

County in Kerman province, Iran

Kahnuj County Persian: شهرستان کهنوج
- County
- Location of Kahnuj County in Kerman province (bottom left, pink)

- Location of Kerman province in Iran
- Coordinates: 27°54′N 57°40′E
- Country: Iran
- Province: Kerman
- Capital: Kahnuj
- Districts: Central, Chah Morid

Population (2016)
  - Total: 95,848
- Time zone: UTC+3:30 (IRST)

Kahnuj County (Persian: شهرستان کهنوج) is in Kerman province, Iran. Its capital is the city of Kahnuj.

== History ==
After the 2006 National Census, Faryab District was separated from the county in the establishment of Faryab County. Dehkahan Rural District was separated from Manujan County to join the Central District. Kutak Rural District was created in the district, and Howmeh Rural District was separated from it in the formation of Chah Morid District, including the new Chah Rigan Rural District.

After the 2016 census, the villages of Chah Morid and Dehkahan were elevated to city status.

== Demographics ==
=== Population ===
At the time of the 2006 census, the county's population was 102,269 in 21,780 households. The following census in 2011 counted 86,290 people in 21,166 households. The 2016 census measured the population of the county as 95,848 in 26,276 households.

=== Administrative divisions ===
Kahnuj County's population history and administrative structure over three consecutive censuses are shown in the following table.

Kahnuj County Population
Administrative Divisions	2006	2011	2016
Central District	70,664	75,064	84,603
Dehkahan RD (Note: Transferred from Manujan County)		7,980	7,397
Howmeh RD	10,491		
Kutak RD		8,768	8,320
Nakhlestan RD	21,602	14,339	16,262
Dehkahan (city) (Note: Became a city after the 2016 census)			
Kahnuj (city)	38,571	43,977	52,624
Chah Morid District		11,226	11,245
Chah Rigan RD		5,791	6,013
Howmeh RD		5,435	5,232
Chah Morid (city) (Note: Became a city after the 2016 census)			
Faryab District (Note: Transferred to Faryab County)	31,605		
Golashkerd RD	5,353		
Hur RD	14,920		
Mehruiyeh RD	6,824		
Faryab (city)	4,508		
Total	102,269	86,290	95,848
RD = Rural District

== See also ==
Media related to Kahnuj County at Wikimedia Commons
