= Central District (Kahnuj County) =

District in Kerman province, Iran

Central District (Kahnuj County) Persian: بخش مرکزی شهرستان کهنوج
- District
- Location within Iran
- Coordinates: 27°54′19″N 57°42′47″E
- Country: Iran
- Province: Kerman
- County: Kahnuj
- Capital: Kahnuj

Population (2016)
  - Total: 84,603
- Time zone: UTC+3:30 (IRST)

The Central District of Kahnuj County (Persian: بخش مرکزی شهرستان کهنوج) is in Kerman province, Iran. Its capital is the city of Kahnuj.

== History ==
After the 2006 National Census, Dehkahan Rural District was separated from Manujan County to join the district. Kutak Rural District was created in the district, and Howmeh Rural District was separated from it in the formation of Chah Morid District.

After the 2016 census, the village of Dehkahan was elevated to the status of a city.

== Demographics ==
=== Population ===
At the time of the 2006 census, the district's population was 70,664 in 15,029 households. The following census in 2011 counted 75,064 people in 18,413 households. The 2016 census measured the population of the district as 84,603 inhabitants in 23,207 households.

=== Administrative divisions ===
Central District (Kahnuj County) Population
Administrative Divisions	2006	2011	2016
Dehkahan RD (Note: Transferred from Manujan County)		7,980	7,397
Howmeh RD (Note: Transferred to Chah Morid District)	10,491		
Kutak RD		8,768	8,320
Nakhlestan RD	21,602	14,339	16,262
Dehkahan (city) (Note: Became a city after the 2016 census)			
Kahnuj (city)	38,571	43,977	52,624
Total	70,664	75,064	84,603
RD = Rural District
