= Darreh Khoshk =

Darreh Khoshk (Persian: دره خشك) may refer to:

- Darreh Khoshk, Izeh, Khuzestan Province
- Darreh Khoshk, Ramhormoz, Khuzestan Province
- Darreh Khoshk-e Hatemvand, Khuzestan Province
- Darreh Khoshk-e Jafarvand, Khuzestan Province
- Darreh Khoshk, Kohgiluyeh and Boyer-Ahmad
