= Mazeh =

Mazeh (Persian: مازه) may refer to:

- Mazeh Gargasht
- Mazeh Kaz
- Mazeh Pariyab
- Mazeh Qola
- Mazeh Sarvemam Qoli
- Mazeh-ye Sardasht
