= Mahur =

Mahur may refer to:

== Geography ==
- Mahur, Maharashtra, India
- Mahur Fort, India
- Mahur, Assam, India
- Mahur, Iran, a village in Khuzestan Province, Iran
- Mahur-e Chah Gandali, a village in Khuzestan Province, Iran
- Mahur Berenji (disambiguation), places in Khuzestan Province, Iran
- Mahur-e Basht, a village in Kohgiluyeh and Boyer-Ahmad Province, Iran
- Mahur Rural District, in Fars Province, Iran

== Music ==
- Dastgāh-e Māhur is a mode (dastgah, maqam, mayeh), in Persian traditional music, identical to the Western major scale
- Mahur is a makam in the music of Turkey

== See also ==
- Mahuri, a Hindu caste in India
