= Vahdat, Khuzestan =

Neighborhood in Khuzestan province, Iran

Vahdat Persian: وحدت
- Neighborhood
- Location within Iran
- Coordinates: 32°36′42″N 48°35′21″E
- Country: Iran
- Province: Khuzestan
- County: Dezful
- District: Shahiyun
- City: Shahiyun

Population (2016)
  - Total: 200
- Time zone: UTC+3:30 (IRST)

Vahdat (Persian: وحدت) (Note: Also romanized as Vaḩdat) is a neighborhood in the city of Shahiyun in Shahiyun District of Dezful County, Khuzestan province, Iran.

== Demographics ==
=== Population ===
At the time of the 2006 National Census, Vahdat's population was 224 in 41 households, when it was a village in Shahi Rural District of Sardasht District. The following census in 2011 counted 217 people in 51 households, by which time the rural district had been separated from the district in the formation of Shahiyun District. The 2016 census measured the population of the village as 200 people in 55 households.

In 2018, the villages of Baghchehban, Bazargah, and Vahdat merged to form the city of Shahiyun.
