= Baghchehban =

Neighborhood in Khuzestan province, Iran

Baghchehban Persian: باغچه بان
- Neighborhood
- Location within Iran
- Coordinates: 32°36′49″N 48°35′28″E
- Country: Iran
- Province: Khuzestan
- County: Dezful
- District: Shahiyun
- City: Shahiyun

Population (2016)
  - Total: 153
- Time zone: UTC+3:30 (IRST)

Baghchehban (Persian: باغچه بان) (Note: Also romanized as Bāghchehbān) is a neighborhood in the city of Shahiyun in Shahiyun District of Dezful County, Khuzestan province, Iran.

== Demographics ==
=== Population ===
At the time of the 2006 National Census, Baghchehban's population was 164 in 36 households, when it was a village in Shahi Rural District of Sardasht District. The following census in 2011 counted 380 people in 68 households, by which time the rural district had been separated from the district in the formation of Shahiyun District. The 2016 census measured the population of the village as 153 people in 44 households.

In 2018, the villages of Baghchehban, Bazargah, and Vahdat merged to form the city of Shahiyun.
