= Bazargah, Khuzestan =

Neighborhood in Khuzestan province, Iran

Bazargah Persian: بازارگه
- Neighborhood
- Location within Iran
- Coordinates: 32°36′40″N 48°34′29″E
- Country: Iran
- Province: Khuzestan
- County: Dezful
- District: Shahiyun
- City: Shahiyun

Population (2016)
  - Total: 230
- Time zone: UTC+3:30 (IRST)

Bazargah (Persian: بازارگه) (Note: Also romanized as Bāzārgah) is a neighborhood in the city of Shahiyun in Shahiyun District of Dezful County, Khuzestan province, Iran.

== Demographics ==
=== Population ===
At the time of the 2006 National Census, Bazargah's population was 221 in 41 households, when it was a village in Shahi Rural District of Sardasht section. The following census in 2011 counted 228 people in 51 households, by which time the rural district had been separated from the district in the establishment of Shahiyun District. The 2016 census measured the population of the village as 230 people in 65 households.

In 2018, the villages of Baghchehban, Bazargah, and Vahdat merged to form the city of Shahiyun.
