= Ab Gareyu =

Ab Gareyu اب گريو
- Village
- Country: Iran
- Province: Khuzestan
- County: Dezful
- Bakhsh: Sardasht
- Rural District: Emamzadeh Seyyed Mahmud

Population (2006)
  - Total: 36
- Time zone: UTC+3:30 (IRST)
  - Summer (DST): UTC+4:30 (IRDT)

Ab Gareyu (Persian: اب گريو, also Romanized as Āb Gareyū) is a village in Emamzadeh Seyyed Mahmud Rural District, Sardasht District, Dezful County, Khuzestan Province, Iran. At the 2006 census, its population was 36, in 5 families.
