= Eidi Mordeh =

Eidi Mordeh (Persian: عيدي مرده) may refer to:

- Eidi Mordeh-ye Bala
- Eidi Mordeh-ye Pain
