= Ab Anari =

Ab Anari اب اناري
- Village
- Location within Iran Location within Middle East
- Coordinates: 32°26′02″N 48°47′30″E
- Country: Iran
- Province: Khuzestan
- County: Dezful
- Bakhsh: Sardasht
- Rural District: Mahur Berenji

Population (2006)
  - Total: 57
- Time zone: UTC+3:30 (IRST)
  - Summer (DST): UTC+4:30 (IRDT)

Ab Anari (Persian: اب اناري, also Romanized as Āb Ānārī) is a village in Mahur Berenji Rural District, Sardasht District, Dezful County, Khuzestan province, Iran. At the 2006 census, its population was 57, in 12 families.
