= Emamzadeh Ahmad Fedaleh =

Village in Khuzestan province, Iran

Emamzadeh Ahmad Fedaleh Persian: امامزاده احمدفداله
- Village
- Location within Iran
- Coordinates: 32°43′06″N 49°11′42″E
- Country: Iran
- Province: Khuzestan
- County: Dezful
- District: Shahiyun
- Rural District: Ahmad Fedaleh

Population (2016)
  - Total: 252
- Time zone: UTC+3:30 (IRST)

Emamzadeh Ahmad Fedaleh (Persian: امامزاده احمدفداله) is a village in Ahmad Fedaleh Rural District of Shahiyun District, Dezful County, Khuzestan province, Iran.

== History ==
After the 2006 National Census, the rural district was separated from Sardasht District in the formation of Shahiyun District.

== Demographics ==
=== Population ===
At the time of the 2011 census, the village's population was below the reporting threshold. The 2016 census measured the population of the village as 252 people in 54 households. It was the most populous village in its rural district.
