= Kharmizan =

Village in Khuzestan province, Iran

Kharmizan Persian: خرميزان
- Village
- Location within Iran
- Country: Iran
- Province: Khuzestan
- County: Dezful
- District: Shahiyun
- Rural District: Emamzadeh Seyyed Mahmud

Population (2016)
  - Total: 202
- Time zone: UTC+3:30 (IRST)

Kharmizan (Persian: خرميزان) (Note: Also romanized as Kharmīzān) is a village in Emamzadeh Seyyed Mahmud Rural District of Shahiyun District, Dezful County, Khuzestan province, Iran.

== Demographics ==
=== Population ===
At the time of the 2006 National Census, the village's population was 115 in 18 households, when it was in Sardasht District. The following census in 2011 counted 111 people in 23 households, by which time the rural district had been separated from the district in the formation of Shahiyun District. The 2016 census measured the population of the village as 202 people in 48 households. It was the most populous village in its rural district.
