= Shahrak-e Ashayiri Hazart Mehdi =

Shahrak-e Ashayri Hazart Mehdi شهرك عشايري حضرت مهدي
- Village
- Country: Iran
- Province: Khuzestan
- County: Dezful
- Bakhsh: Sardasht
- Rural District: Mahur Berenji

Population (2006)
  - Total: 1,101
- Time zone: UTC+3:30 (IRST)
  - Summer (DST): UTC+4:30 (IRDT)

Shahrak-e Ashayri Hazart Mehdi (Persian: شهرك عشايري حضرت مهدي, also Romanized as Shahrak-e ʿAshāyrī Ḩaz̤art Mehdī) is a village in Mahur Berenji Rural District, Sardasht District, Dezful County, Khuzestan Province, Iran. At the 2006 census, its population was 1,101, in 215 families.
