= Abdolreza Mordeh =

Abdolreza Mordeh عبدالرضامرده
- Village
- Country: Iran
- Province: Khuzestan
- County: Dezful
- Bakhsh: Sardasht
- Rural District: Shahi

Population (2006)
  - Total: 22
- Time zone: UTC+3:30 (IRST)
  - Summer (DST): UTC+4:30 (IRDT)

Abdolreza Mordeh (Persian: عبدالرضامرده, also Romanized as ʿAbdolrez̤ā Mordeh) is a village in Shahi Rural District, Sardasht District, Dezful County, Khuzestan Province, Iran. At the 2006 census, its population was 22, in 5 families.
