= Ab Sila =

Coordinates: 31°53′26″N 49°44′06″E

Ab Sila اب سيلا
- Village
- Interactive map of Ab Sila
- Country: Iran
- Province: Khuzestan
- County: Dezful
- Bakhsh: Sardasht
- Rural District: Darreh Kayad

Population (2006)
  - Total: 50
- Time zone: UTC+3:30 (IRST)
  - Summer (DST): UTC+4:30 (IRDT)

Ab Sila (Persian: اب سيلا, also Romanized as Āb Sīlā) is a village in Darreh Kayad Rural District, Sardasht District, Dezful County, Khuzestan province, Iran. At the 2006 census, its population was 50, in 9 families.
