= Sag Kash Durak =

Sag Kash Durak سگ كش دورك
- Village
- Country: Iran
- Province: Khuzestan
- County: Dezful
- Bakhsh: Sardasht
- Rural District: Darreh Kayad

Population (2006)
  - Total: 56
- Time zone: UTC+3:30 (IRST)
  - Summer (DST): UTC+4:30 (IRDT)

Sag Kash Durak (Persian: سگ كش دورك, also Romanized as Sag Kash Dūraḵ) is a village in Darreh Kayad Rural District, Sardasht District, Dezful County, Khuzestan Province, Iran. At the 2006 census, its population was 56, in 12 families.
