= Labab =

Village in Khuzestan province, Iran

Labab Persian: لباب
- Village
- Location within Iran
- Coordinates: 32°47′27″N 49°10′12″E
- Country: Iran
- Province: Khuzestan
- County: Dezful
- District: Shahiyun
- Rural District: Darreh Kayad

Population (2016)
  - Total: 255
- Time zone: UTC+3:30 (IRST)

Labab (Persian: لباب) (Note: Also romanized as Labāb) is a village in Darreh Kayad Rural District of Shahiyun District, Dezful County, Khuzestan province, Iran.

== Demographics ==
=== Population ===
At the time of the 2006 National Census, the village's population was 128 in 20 households, when it was in Sardasht District. The following census in 2011 counted 155 people in 33 households, by which time the rural district had been separated from the district in the establishment of Shahiyun District. The 2016 census measured the population of the village as 255 people in 55 households. It was the most populous village in its rural district.
