= Gol Gonjan =

Gol Gonjan گل گنجان
- Village
- Location within Iran
- Coordinates: 32°50′00″N 49°07′00″E
- Country: Iran
- Province: Khuzestan
- County: Dezful
- Bakhsh: Sardasht
- Rural District: Darreh Kayad

Population (2006)
  - Total: 42
- Time zone: UTC+3:30 (IRST)
  - Summer (DST): UTC+4:30 (IRDT)

Gol Gonjan (Persian: گل گنجان, also Romanized as Gol Gonjān; also known as Galeh Gonjān and Galleh Gonjān) is a village in Darreh Kayad Rural District, Sardasht District, Dezful County, Khuzestan Province, Iran. At the 2006 census, its population was 42, in 8 families.
