= Gusheh, Khuzestan =

Village in Khuzestan province, Iran

Gusheh Persian: گوشه
- Village
- Location within Iran
- Coordinates: 32°43′12″N 48°46′48″E
- Country: Iran
- Province: Khuzestan
- County: Dezful
- District: Shahiyun
- Rural District: Seyyed Vali ol Din

Population (2016)
  - Total: 98
- Time zone: UTC+3:30 (IRST)

Gusheh (Persian: گوشه) (Note: Also romanized as Gūsheh) is a village in, and the capital of, Seyyed Vali ol Din Rural District of Shahiyun District, Dezful County, Khuzestan province, Iran.

== Demographics ==
=== Population ===
At the time of the 2006 National Census, the village's population was 38 in seven households, when it was in Sardasht District. The following census in 2011 counted 109 people in 26 households, by which time the rural district had been separated from the district in the formation of Shahiyun District. The 2016 census measured the population of the village as 98 people in 26 households.
