= Palang Ab =

Palang Ab پلنگ اب
- Village
- Location within Iran
- Coordinates: 32°24′44″N 48°45′46″E
- Country: Iran
- Province: Khuzestan
- County: Dezful
- Bakhsh: Sardasht
- Rural District: Mahur Berenji

Population (2006)
  - Total: 48
- Time zone: UTC+3:30 (IRST)
  - Summer (DST): UTC+4:30 (IRDT)

Palang Ab (Persian: پلنگ اب, also Romanized as Palang Āb) is a village in Mahur Berenji Rural District, Sardasht District, Dezful County, Khuzestan Province, Iran. At the 2006 census, its population was 48, in 9 families.
