= Mamili =

Mamili مميلي
- Village
- Location within Iran
- Coordinates: 32°35′25″N 48°35′30″E
- Country: Iran
- Province: Khuzestan
- County: Dezful
- Bakhsh: Sardasht
- Rural District: Shahi

Population (2006)
  - Total: 86
- Time zone: UTC+3:30 (IRST)
  - Summer (DST): UTC+4:30 (IRDT)

Mamili (Persian: مميلي, also Romanized as Mamīlī) is a village in Shahi Rural District, Sardasht District, Dezful County, Khuzestan Province, Iran. At the 2006 census, its population was 86, in 16 families.
