= Mahur Berenji =

Mahur Berenji or Mahoor Berenji (Persian: ماهوربرنجي) may refer to:

- Mahur Berenji-ye Olya
- Mahur Berenji-ye Sofla
- Mahur Berenji Rural District
