= Bariki =

Bariki (Persian: باريكي) may refer to:

- Bariki, Afghanistan
- Bariki-ye Hasan Qoli
- Bariki-ye Mohammad Qoli
