= Chagah =

Village in Khuzestan province, Iran

Chagah Persian: چگاه
- Village
- Country: Iran
- Province: Khuzestan
- County: Dezful
- District: Shahiyun
- Rural District: Shahi

Population (2016)
  - Total: 285
- Time zone: UTC+3:30 (IRST)

Chagah (Persian: چگاه) (Note: Also romanized as Chagāh) is a village in Shahi Rural District of Shahiyun District, Dezful County, Khuzestan province, Iran.

== Demographics ==
=== Population ===
At the time of the 2006 National Census, the village's population was 170 in 30 households, when it was in Sardasht District. The following census in 2011 counted 123 people in 25 households, by which time the rural district had been separated from the district in the formation of Shahiyun District. The 2016 census measured the population of the village as 285 people in 61 households. It was the most populous village in its rural district.
