= Kuh Gandom =

Kuh Gandom كوه گندم
- Village
- Location within Iran
- Coordinates: 32°35′35″N 48°36′33″E
- Country: Iran
- Province: Khuzestan
- County: Dezful
- Bakhsh: Sardasht
- Rural District: Shahi

Population (2006)
  - Total: 40
- Time zone: UTC+3:30 (IRST)
  - Summer (DST): UTC+4:30 (IRDT)

Kuh Gandom (Persian: كوه گندم, also Romanized as Kūh Gandom) is a village in Shahi Rural District, Sardasht District, Dezful County, Khuzestan Province, Iran. At the 2006 census, its population was 40, in 6 families.
