= Patakht-e Shah Mohammad =

Patakht-e Shah Mohammad پايتخت شامحمد
- Village
- Location within Iran
- Coordinates: 32°42′00″N 49°14′00″E
- Country: Iran
- Province: Khuzestan
- County: Dezful
- Bakhsh: Sardasht
- Rural District: Darreh Kayad

Population (2006)
  - Total: 52
- Time zone: UTC+3:30 (IRST)
  - Summer (DST): UTC+4:30 (IRDT)

Patakht-e Shah Mohammad (Persian: پايتخت شامحمد, also Romanized as Pātakht-e Shāh Moḩammad) is a village in Darreh Kayad Rural District, Sardasht District, Dezful County, Khuzestan Province, Iran. At the 2006 census, its population was 52, in 9 families.
