= Taneh Berri =

Taneh Berri تنه بري
- Village
- Location within Iran
- Coordinates: 32°54′51″N 48°46′15″E
- Country: Iran
- Province: Khuzestan
- County: Dezful
- Bakhsh: Sardasht
- Rural District: Emamzadeh Seyyed Mahmud

Population (2006)
  - Total: 38
- Time zone: UTC+3:30 (IRST)
  - Summer (DST): UTC+4:30 (IRDT)

Taneh Berri (Persian: تنه بري, also Romanized as Taneh Berrī; also known as Taneh Yerī) is a village in Emamzadeh Seyyed Mahmud Rural District, Sardasht District, Dezful County, Khuzestan Province, Iran. At the 2006 census, its population was 38, in 5 families.
