= Pachel Chalavaz =

Pachel Chalavaz پاچل چلاوز
- Village
- Country: Iran
- Province: Khuzestan
- County: Dezful
- Bakhsh: Sardasht
- Rural District: Ahmadfedaleh

Population (2006)
  - Total: 32
- Time zone: UTC+3:30 (IRST)
  - Summer (DST): UTC+4:30 (IRDT)

Pachel Chalavaz (Persian: پاچل چلاوز, also Romanized as Pāchel Chalāvaz) is a village in Ahmadfedaleh Rural District, Sardasht District, Dezful County, Khuzestan Province, Iran. At the 2006 census, its population was 32, in 5 families.
