= Pamalich =

Pamalich پامليچ
- Village
- Location within Iran
- Coordinates: 32°42′59″N 48°40′47″E
- Country: Iran
- Province: Khuzestan
- County: Dezful
- Bakhsh: Sardasht
- Rural District: Shahi

Population (2006)
  - Total: 31
- Time zone: UTC+3:30 (IRST)
  - Summer (DST): UTC+4:30 (IRDT)

Pamalich (Persian: پامليچ, also Romanized as Pāmalīch) is a village in Shahi Rural District, Sardasht District, Dezful County, Khuzestan Province, Iran. At the 2006 census, its population was 31, in 6 families.
