= Dasmurt =

Dasmurt داسمورت
- Village
- Location within Iran
- Coordinates: 32°43′06″N 49°02′55″E
- Country: Iran
- Province: Khuzestan
- County: Dezful
- Bakhsh: Sardasht
- Rural District: Ahmadfedaleh

Population (2006)
  - Total: 53
- Time zone: UTC+3:30 (IRST)
  - Summer (DST): UTC+4:30 (IRDT)

Dasmurt (Persian: داسمورت, also Romanized as Dāsmūrt) is a village in Ahmadfedaleh Rural District, Sardasht District, Dezful County, Khuzestan Province, Iran. At the 2006 census, its population was 53, in 6 families.
