= Chelun, Iran =

Chelun چلون
- Village
- Location within Iran
- Coordinates: 32°49′11″N 48°57′17″E
- Country: Iran
- Province: Khuzestan
- County: Dezful
- Bakhsh: Sardasht
- Rural District: Emamzadeh Seyyed Mahmud

Population (2006)
  - Total: 84
- Time zone: UTC+3:30 (IRST)
  - Summer (DST): UTC+4:30 (IRDT)

Chelun (Persian: چلون, also Romanized as Chelūn) is a village in Emamzadeh Seyyed Mahmud Rural District, Sardasht District, Dezful County, Khuzestan Province, Iran. At the 2006 census, its population was 84, in 12 families.
