= Azanak =

Azanak (Persian: ازنك) may refer to:

- Azanak-e Kukya
- Azanak-e Olya
