= Darreh-ye Lirgeh Durak =

Darreh-ye Lirgeh Durak دره ليرگه دورك
- Village
- Country: Iran
- Province: Khuzestan
- County: Dezful
- Bakhsh: Sardasht
- Rural District: Darreh Kayad

Population (2006)
  - Total: 30
- Time zone: UTC+3:30 (IRST)
  - Summer (DST): UTC+4:30 (IRDT)

Darreh-ye Lirgeh Durak (Persian: دره ليرگه دورك, also Romanized as Darreh-ye Līrgeh Dūraḵ) is a village in Darreh Kayad Rural District, Sardasht District, Dezful County, Khuzestan Province, Iran. At the 2006 census, its population was 30, in 6 families.
