= Chal Revegeh =

Chal Revegeh چال روگه
- Village
- Location within Iran
- Coordinates: 32°52′04″N 49°07′55″E
- Country: Iran
- Province: Khuzestan
- County: Dezful
- Bakhsh: Sardasht
- Rural District: Darreh Kayad

Population (2006)
  - Total: 57
- Time zone: UTC+3:30 (IRST)
  - Summer (DST): UTC+4:30 (IRDT)

Chal Revegeh (Persian: چال روگه, also Romanized as Chāl Revegeh; also known as Chāleh Revgar and Chāleh-ye Revgar) is a village in Darreh Kayad Rural District, Sardasht District, Dezful County, Khuzestan Province, Iran. At the 2006 census, its population was 57, living in 10 families.
