= Gameh Tarap =

Gameh Tarap گمه ترپ
- Village
- Country: Iran
- Province: Khuzestan
- County: Dezful
- Bakhsh: Sardasht
- Rural District: Seyyedvaliyeddin

Population (2006)
  - Total: 23
- Time zone: UTC+3:30 (IRST)
  - Summer (DST): UTC+4:30 (IRDT)

Gameh Tarap (Persian: گمه ترپ) is a village in Seyyedvaliyeddin Rural District, Sardasht District, Dezful County, Khuzestan Province, Iran. At the 2006 census, its population was 23, in 4 families.
