= Sar Sardab =

Sar Sardab (Persian: سرسرداب) may refer to:

- Sar Sardab-e Olya
- Sar Sardab-e Sofla
