= Dehzanun =

Dehzanun ده زنون
- Village
- Location within Iran
- Coordinates: 32°52′18″N 48°59′20″E
- Country: Iran
- Province: Khuzestan
- County: Dezful
- Bakhsh: Sardasht
- Rural District: Darreh Kayad

Population (2006)
  - Total: 104
- Time zone: UTC+3:30 (IRST)
  - Summer (DST): UTC+4:30 (IRDT)

Dehzanun (Persian: ده زنون, also Romanized as Dehzanūn; also known as Dehzanān) is a village in Darreh Kayad Rural District, Sardasht District, Dezful County, Khuzestan Province, Iran. At the 2006 census, its population was 104, in 19 families.
