= Galeh Har =

Galeh Har گله هر
- Village
- Location within Iran
- Coordinates: 32°48′10″N 49°17′41″E
- Country: Iran
- Province: Khuzestan
- County: Dezful
- Bakhsh: Sardasht
- Rural District: Darreh Kayad

Population (2006)
  - Total: 25
- Time zone: UTC+3:30 (IRST)
  - Summer (DST): UTC+4:30 (IRDT)

Galeh Har (Persian: گله هر; also known as Galleh Hod) is a village in Darreh Kayad Rural District, Sardasht District, Dezful County, Khuzestan Province, Iran. At the 2006 census, its population was 25, in 4 families.
