= Bar Aftab-e Olya =

Village in Khuzestan province, Iran

Bar Aftab-e Olya Persian: برافتاب عليا
- Village
- Location within Iran
- Country: Iran
- Province: Khuzestan
- County: Dezful
- District: Shahiyun
- Rural District: Seyyed Vali ol Din

Population (2016)
  - Total: 171
- Time zone: UTC+3:30 (IRST)

Bar Aftab-e Olya (Persian: برافتاب عليا) (Note: Also romanized as Bar Āftāb-e ‘Olyā; also known as Bar Āftāb-e Bālā) is a village in Seyyed Vali ol Din Rural District of Shahiyun District of Dezful County, Khuzestan Province, Iran.

== Demographics ==
=== Population ===
At the time of the 2006 National Census, the village's population was 121 in 24 households, when it was in Sardasht District. The following census in 2011 counted 16 people in four households, by which time the rural district had been separated from the district in the formation of Shahiyun District. The 2016 census measured the population of the village as 171 people in 38 households. It was the most populous village in its rural district.
