= Telinkuh =

Telinkuh تلينكوه
- Village
- Location within Iran
- Coordinates: 32°55′00″N 48°47′00″E
- Country: Iran
- Province: Khuzestan
- County: Dezful
- Bakhsh: Sardasht
- Rural District: Emamzadeh Seyyed Mahmud

Population (2006)
  - Total: 56
- Time zone: UTC+3:30 (IRST)
  - Summer (DST): UTC+4:30 (IRDT)

Telinkuh (Persian: تلينكوه, also Romanized as Telīnkūh) is a village in Emamzadeh Seyyed Mahmud Rural District, Sardasht District, Dezful County, Khuzestan Province, Iran. At the 2006 census, its population was 56, in 11 families.
