= Gursharan Owsta =

Gursharan Owsta گورشران اوستا
- Village
- Location within Iran
- Coordinates: 32°23′55″N 48°42′58″E
- Country: Iran
- Province: Khuzestan
- County: Dezful
- Bakhsh: Sardasht
- Rural District: Mahur Berenji

Population (2006)
  - Total: 39
- Time zone: UTC+3:30 (IRST)
  - Summer (DST): UTC+4:30 (IRDT)

Gursharan Owsta (Persian: گورشران اوستا, also Romanized as Gūrsharān Owstā; also known as Kūrsharān) is a village in Mahur Berenji Rural District, Sardasht District, Dezful County, Khuzestan Province, Iran. At the 2006 census, its population was 39, in 5 families.
