= Sarhud Khoda Rahim =

Sarhud Khoda Rahim سرهودخدارحم
- Village
- Country: Iran
- Province: Khuzestan
- County: Dezful
- Bakhsh: Sardasht
- Rural District: Shahi

Population (2006)
  - Total: 23
- Time zone: UTC+3:30 (IRST)
  - Summer (DST): UTC+4:30 (IRDT)

Sarhud Khoda Rahim (Persian: سرهودخدارحم, also Romanized as Sarhūd Khodā Raḥim) is a village in Shahi Rural District, Sardasht District, Dezful County, Khuzestan Province, Iran. At the 2006 census, its population was 23, in 5 families.
