= Deyowni =

Deyowni ديوني
- Village
- Location within Iran
- Coordinates: 32°37′06″N 48°40′32″E
- Country: Iran
- Province: Khuzestan
- County: Dezful
- Bakhsh: Sardasht
- Rural District: Shahi

Population (2006)
  - Total: 194
- Time zone: UTC+3:30 (IRST)
  - Summer (DST): UTC+4:30 (IRDT)

Deyowni (Persian: ديوني, also Romanized as Deyownī) is a village in Shahi Rural District, Sardasht District, Dezful County, Khuzestan Province, Iran. At the 2006 census, its population was 194, in 35 families.
