= Shavit (disambiguation) =

Shavit (Hebrew: שביט, meaning comet) is a Hebrew surname and given name.

Shavit may also refer to:

- Shavit, Iran, village in Iran
- Shavit 2, an Israeli lift launch vehicle first used in 1982
- Shavit 2 (sounding rocket), a 1961 Israeli sounding rocket

== See also ==
- Nahshon Shavit, Israeli modification of Gulfstream 5 (G-500) for SIGINT
