= Deh-e Seyyed Ahmad =

Deh-e Seyyed Ahmad ده سيداحمد
- Village
- Location within Iran
- Coordinates: 32°22′00″N 49°38′00″E
- Country: Iran
- Province: Khuzestan
- County: Dezful
- Bakhsh: Sardasht
- Rural District: Ahmadfedaleh

Population (2006)
  - Total: 21
- Time zone: UTC+3:30 (IRST)
  - Summer (DST): UTC+4:30 (IRDT)

Deh-e Seyyed Ahmad (Persian: ده سيداحمد, also Romanized as Deh-e Seyyed Aḩmad; also known as Deh-e Seyyed) is a village in Ahmadfedaleh Rural District, Sardasht District, Dezful County, Khuzestan Province, Iran. At the 2006 census, its population was 21, in 4 families.
