= Chel Shah Heydar Aqa =

Chel Shah Heydar Aqa چل شه حيدراقا
- Village
- Country: Iran
- Province: Khuzestan
- County: Dezful
- Bakhsh: Sardasht
- Rural District: Darreh Kayad

Population (2006)
  - Total: 25
- Time zone: UTC+3:30 (IRST)
  - Summer (DST): UTC+4:30 (IRDT)

Chel Shah Heydar Aqa (Persian: چل شه حيدراقا, also Romanized as Chel Shah Ḩeydar Āqā) is a village in Darreh Kayad Rural District, Sardasht District, Dezful County, Khuzestan Province, Iran. At the 2006 census, its population was 25, in 4 families.
