= Tit Gom =

Tit Gom تيت گم
- Village
- Location within Iran
- Coordinates: 32°52′35″N 48°55′05″E
- Country: Iran
- Province: Khuzestan
- County: Dezful
- Bakhsh: Sardasht
- Rural District: Darreh Kayad

Population (2006)
  - Total: 39
- Time zone: UTC+3:30 (IRST)
  - Summer (DST): UTC+4:30 (IRDT)

Tit Gom (Persian: تيت گم, also Romanized as Tīt Gom) is a village in Darreh Kayad Rural District, Sardasht District, Dezful County, Khuzestan Province, Iran. At the 2006 census, its population was 39, in 5 families.
