= Kul Sira =

Village in Khuzestan province, Iran

Kul Sira Persian: كول سيرا
- Village
- Location within Iran
- Coordinates: 32°48′33″N 49°09′03″E
- Country: Iran
- Province: Khuzestan
- County: Dezful
- District: Shahiyun
- Rural District: Darreh Kayad

Population (2016)
  - Total: 142
- Time zone: UTC+3:30 (IRST)

Kul Sira (Persian: كول سيرا) (Note: Also romanized as Kūl Sīrā; also known as Kūl Sīrāb) is a village in, and the capital of, Darreh Kayad Rural District of Shahiyun District, Dezful County, Khuzestan province, Iran.

== Demographics ==
=== Population ===
At the time of the 2006 National Census, the village's population was 194 in 34 households, when it was in Sardasht District. The following census in 2011 counted 83 people in 19 households, by which time the rural district had been separated from the district in the formation of Shahiyun District. The 2016 census measured the population of the village as 142 people in 35 households.
