= Shahrak-e Kowsar =

Shahrak-e Kowsar شهرك كوثر
- Village
- Country: Iran
- Province: Khuzestan
- County: Dezful
- Bakhsh: Sardasht
- Rural District: Mahur Berenji

Population (2006)
  - Total: 1,506
- Time zone: UTC+3:30 (IRST)
  - Summer (DST): UTC+4:30 (IRDT)

Shahrak-e Kowsar (Persian: شهرك كوثر, also Romanized as Shahrak-e Kows̱ar) is a village in Mahur Berenji Rural District, Sardasht District, Dezful County, Khuzestan Province, Iran. At the 2006 census, its population was 1,506, in 283 families.
