= Baba Khoda =

Baba Khoda بابا خدا
- Village
- Country: Iran
- Province: Khuzestan
- County: Dezful
- Bakhsh: Sardasht
- Rural District: Ahmadfedaleh

Population (2006)
  - Total: 31
- Time zone: UTC+3:30 (IRST)
  - Summer (DST): UTC+4:30 (IRDT)

Baba Khoda (Persian: بابا خدا, also Romanized as Bābā Khodā) is a village in Ahmadfedaleh Rural District, Sardasht District, Dezful County, Khuzestan Province, Iran. At the 2006 census, its population was 31, in 5 families.
