= Jalizav =

Jalizav جليزاو
- Village
- Location within Iran
- Coordinates: 32°52′34″N 48°59′03″E
- Country: Iran
- Province: Khuzestan
- County: Dezful
- Bakhsh: Sardasht
- Rural District: Darreh Kayad

Population (2006)
  - Total: 27
- Time zone: UTC+3:30 (IRST)
  - Summer (DST): UTC+4:30 (IRDT)

Jalizav (Persian: جليزاو, also Romanized as Jālīzāv; also known as Jālīzāb) is a village in Darreh Kayad Rural District, Sardasht District, Dezful County, Khuzestan Province, Iran. At the 2006 census, its population was 27, in 6 families.
