= Ab Difeh =

Ab Difeh (Persian: آبديفه) may refer to:

- Ab Difeh, Khuzestan
- Ab Difeh, Lorestan
