= Pir Fazak =

Pir Fazak پيرفزك
- Village
- Location within Iran
- Coordinates: 32°29′44″N 48°42′19″E
- Country: Iran
- Province: Khuzestan
- County: Dezful
- Bakhsh: Sardasht
- Rural District: Shahi

Population (2006)
  - Total: 29
- Time zone: UTC+3:30 (IRST)
  - Summer (DST): UTC+4:30 (IRDT)

Pir Fazak (Persian: پيرفزك, also Romanized as Pīr Fazak; also known as Pīr Qazak) is a village in Shahi Rural District, Sardasht District, Dezful County, Khuzestan Province, Iran. At the 2006 census, its population was 29, in 5 families.
