= Sabz Ab =

Sabz Ab سبزاب
- Village
- Location within Iran
- Coordinates: 32°17′43″N 48°39′52″E
- Country: Iran
- Province: Khuzestan
- County: Dezful
- Bakhsh: Sardasht
- Rural District: Mahur Berenji

Population (2006)
  - Total: 665
- Time zone: UTC+3:30 (IRST)
  - Summer (DST): UTC+4:30 (IRDT)

Sabz Ab (Persian: سبزاب, also Romanized as Sabz Āb) is a village in Mahur Berenji Rural District, Sardasht District, Dezful County, Khuzestan Province, Iran. At the 2006 census, its population was 665, in 128 families.
