= Chal Qasem =

Chal Qasem چال قاسم
- Village
- Location within Iran
- Coordinates: 32°35′17″N 48°37′32″E
- Country: Iran
- Province: Khuzestan
- County: Dezful
- Bakhsh: Sardasht
- Rural District: Shahi

Population (2006)
  - Total: 93
- Time zone: UTC+3:30 (IRST)
  - Summer (DST): UTC+4:30 (IRDT)

Chal Qasem (Persian: چال قاسم, also Romanized as Chāl Qāsem) is a village in Shahi Rural District, Sardasht District, Dezful County, Khuzestan Province, Iran. At the 2006 census, its population was 93, in 14 families.
