= Deleh Chenar =

Deleh Chenar دله چنار
- Village
- Location within Iran
- Coordinates: 32°45′00″N 49°04′00″E
- Country: Iran
- Province: Khuzestan
- County: Dezful
- Bakhsh: Sardasht
- Rural District: Ahmadfedaleh

Population (2006)
  - Total: 105
- Time zone: UTC+3:30 (IRST)
  - Summer (DST): UTC+4:30 (IRDT)

Deleh Chenar (Persian: دله چنار, also Romanized as Deleh Chenār) is a village in Ahmadfedaleh Rural District, Sardasht District, Dezful County, Khuzestan Province, Iran. At the 2006 census, its population was 105, in 14 families.
