= Malek Morad =

Malek Morad ملك مراد
- Village
- Location within Iran
- Coordinates: 32°39′42″N 48°48′39″E
- Country: Iran
- Province: Khuzestan
- County: Dezful
- Bakhsh: Sardasht
- Rural District: Seyyedvaliyeddin

Population (2006)
  - Total: 50
- Time zone: UTC+3:30 (IRST)
  - Summer (DST): UTC+4:30 (IRDT)

Malek Morad (Persian: ملك مراد, also Romanized as Malek Morād) is a village in Seyyedvaliyeddin Rural District, Sardasht District, Dezful County, Khuzestan Province, Iran. At the 2006 census, its population was 50, in 7 families.
