= Chal Tak-e Pain =

Chal Tak-e Pain چال تاك پائين
- Village
- Location within Iran
- Coordinates: 32°43′27″N 49°06′16″E
- Country: Iran
- Province: Khuzestan
- County: Dezful
- Bakhsh: Sardasht
- Rural District: Ahmadfedaleh

Population (2006)
  - Total: 31
- Time zone: UTC+3:30 (IRST)
  - Summer (DST): UTC+4:30 (IRDT)

Chal Tak-e Pain (Persian: چال تاك پائين, also Romanized as Chāl Tāk-e Pā’īn) is a village in Ahmadfedaleh Rural District, Sardasht District, Dezful County, Khuzestan Province, Iran. At the 2006 census, its population was 31, in 6 families.
