= Bugandeh =

Bugandeh بوگنده
- Village
- Country: Iran
- Province: Khuzestan
- County: Dezful
- Bakhsh: Sardasht
- Rural District: Mahur Berenji

Population (2006)
  - Total: 27
- Time zone: UTC+3:30 (IRST)
  - Summer (DST): UTC+4:30 (IRDT)

Bugandeh (Persian: بوگنده, also Romanized as Būgandeh) is a village in Mahur Berenji Rural District, Sardasht District, Dezful County, Khuzestan Province, Iran. At the 2006 census, its population was 27, in 4 families.
