= Tileh Molla =

Tileh Molla تله ملا
- Village
- Location within Iran
- Coordinates: 32°47′35″N 48°50′43″E
- Country: Iran
- Province: Khuzestan
- County: Dezful
- Bakhsh: Sardasht
- Rural District: Emamzadeh Seyyed Mahmud

Population (2006)
  - Total: 23
- Time zone: UTC+3:30 (IRST)
  - Summer (DST): UTC+4:30 (IRDT)

Tileh Molla (Persian: تله ملا, also Romanized as Tīleh Mollā) is a village in Emamzadeh Seyyed Mahmud Rural District, Sardasht District, Dezful County, Khuzestan Province, Iran. At the 2006 census, its population was 23, in 4 families. The climate of Tileh Molla is of hot-summer Mediterranean climate.
