= Dast-e Ney =

Dast-e Ney دست ني
- Village
- Location within Iran
- Coordinates: 32°52′00″N 48°46′00″E
- Country: Iran
- Province: Khuzestan
- County: Dezful
- Bakhsh: Sardasht
- Rural District: Emamzadeh Seyyed Mahmud

Population (2006)
  - Total: 41
- Time zone: UTC+3:30 (IRST)
  - Summer (DST): UTC+4:30 (IRDT)

Dast-e Ney (Persian: دست ني) is a village in Emamzadeh Seyyed Mahmud Rural District, Sardasht District, Dezful County, Khuzestan Province, Iran. In a 2006 census, its population was 41, in 6 families.
