= Zibashahr, Khuzestan =

Coordinates: 31.305648°N 48.69999°E

Zibashahr زيباشهر
- Village
- Interactive map of Zibashahr
- Country: Iran
- Province: Khuzestan
- County: Dezful
- Bakhsh: Sardasht
- Rural District: Mahur Berenji

Population (2006)
  - Total: 2,104
- Time zone: UTC+3:30 (IRST)
  - Summer (DST): UTC+4:30 (IRDT)

Zibashahr (Persian: زيباشهر, also Romanized as Zībāshahr) is a village in Mahur Berenji Rural District, Sardasht District, Dezful County, Khuzestan Province, Iran. At the 2006 census, its population was 2,104, in 416 families.
