= Shavi, Dezful =

Village in Khuzestan province, Iran

Shavi Persian: شوي
- Village
- Location within Iran
- Coordinates: 32°47′52″N 48°48′37″E
- Country: Iran
- Province: Khuzestan
- County: Dezful
- District: Shahiyun
- Rural District: Emamzadeh Seyyed Mahmud

Population (2016)
  - Total: 92
- Time zone: UTC+3:30 (IRST)

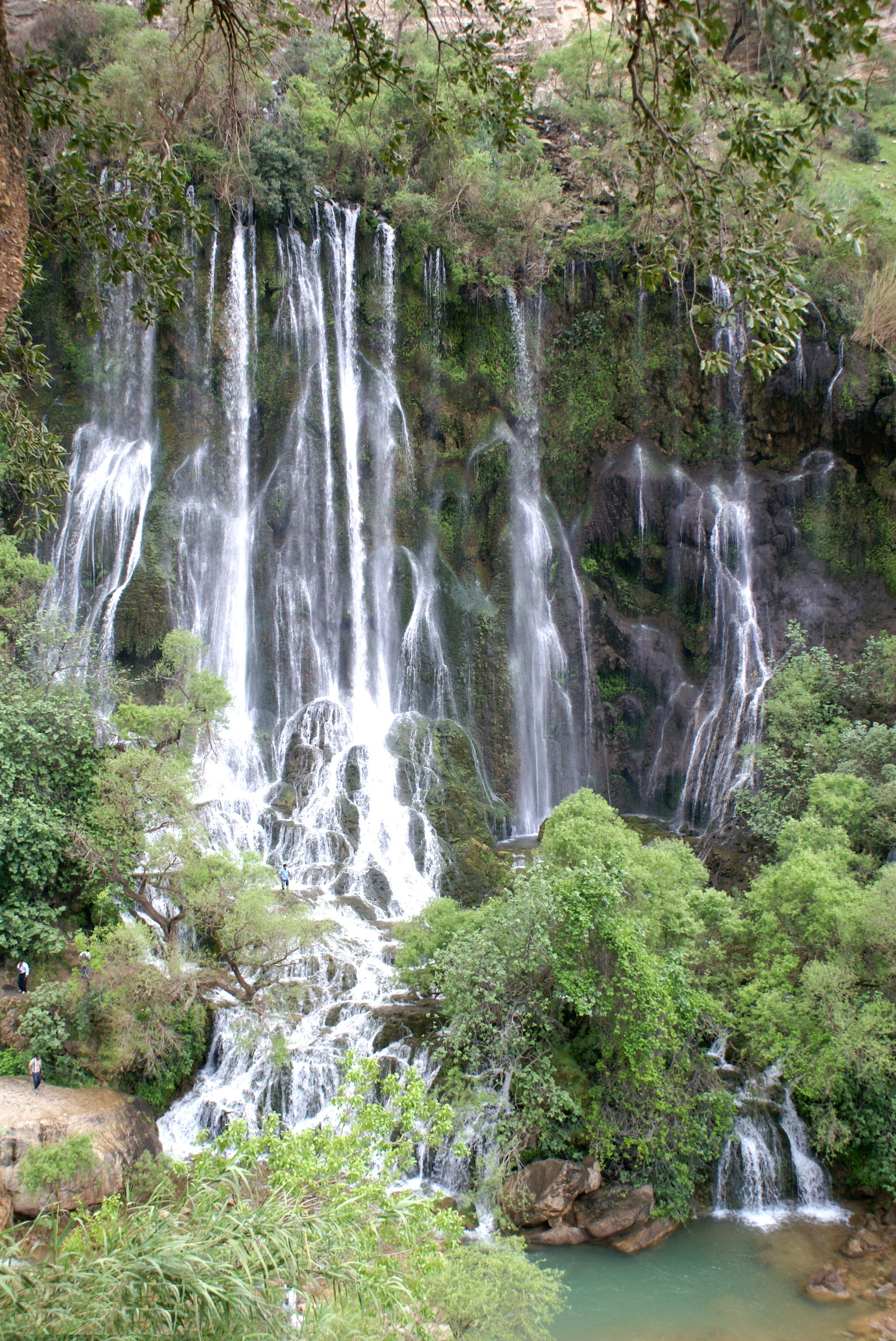
Waterfalls in Shevi

Shavi (Persian: شوي) (Note: Also romanized as Shavī and Shevī; also known as Shavīt, Shewīt, and Shīvīn) is a village in, and the capital of, Emamzadeh Seyyed Mahmud Rural District of Shahiyun District, Dezful County, Khuzestan province, Iran.

== Demographics ==
=== Population ===
At the time of the 2006 National Census, the village's population was 30 in four households, when it was in Sardasht District. The following census in 2011 counted 24 people in seven households, by which time the rural district had been separated from the district in the formation of Shahiyun District. The 2016 census measured the population of the village as 92 people in 27 households.
