= Bariki-ye Hasan Qoli =

Bariki-ye Hasan Qoli باريكي حسنقلي
- Village
- Country: Iran
- Province: Khuzestan
- County: Dezful
- Bakhsh: Sardasht
- Rural District: Shahi

Population (2006)
  - Total: 23
- Time zone: UTC+3:30 (IRST)
  - Summer (DST): UTC+4:30 (IRDT)

Bariki-ye Hasan Qoli (Persian: باريكي حسنقلي, also Romanized as Bārīḵī-ye Ḩasan Qolī) is a village in Shahi Rural District, Sardasht District, Dezful County, Khuzestan Province, Iran. At the 2006 census, its population was 23, in 4 families.
