= Shahiyun =

City in Khuzestan province, Iran

Shahiyun Persian: شهیون
- City
- Location within Iran
- Coordinates: 32°36′54″N 48°35′07″E
- Country: Iran
- Province: Khuzestan
- County: Dezful
- District: Shahiyun

Population (2016)
  - Total: 583
- Time zone: UTC+3:30 (IRST)

Shahiyun (Persian: شهیون) is a city in, and the capital of, Shahiyun District of Dezful County, Khuzestan province, Iran. It also serves as the administrative center for Shahi Rural District. The city is a merger of the villages of Baghchehban, Bazargah, and Vahdat.

== Demographics ==
=== Population ===
At the time of the 2006 National Census, the population (as the total of its constituent villages before their merger) was 609 in 118 households, when it was in Shahi Rural District of Sardasht District. The following census in 2011 counted 825 people in 170 households, by which time the rural district had been separated from the district in the establishment of Shahiyun District. The 2016 census measured the population as 583 people in 164 households.

In 2018, the villages merged to form city of Shahiyun.
