= Boneh-ye Hoseyn Kaluli =

Village in Khuzestan province, Iran

Boneh-ye Hoseyn Kaluli Persian: بنه حسين كلولي
- Village
- Location within Iran
- Coordinates: 32°21′07″N 48°28′17″E
- Country: Iran
- Province: Khuzestan
- County: Dezful
- District: Sardasht
- Rural District: Mahur Berenji

Population (2016)
  - Total: 3,170
- Time zone: UTC+3:30 (IRST)

Boneh-ye Hoseyn Kaluli (Persian: بنه حسين كلولي) (Note: Also romanized as Boneh Hoseinkalooli, Boneh Ḩoseyn Kolūlī, and Boneh-ye Ḩoseyn Kalūlī) is a village in Mahur Berenji Rural District of Sardasht District, Dezful County, Khuzestan province, Iran.

== Demographics ==
=== Population ===
At the time of the 2006 National Census, the village's population was 1,941 in 378 households. The following census in 2011 counted 2,914 people in 630 households. The 2016 census measured the population of the village as 3,170 people in 796 households. It was the most populous village in its rural district.
