= Eidi Mordeh-ye Pain =

Eidi Mordeh-ye Pain عيدي مرده پايين
- Village
- Country: Iran
- Province: Khuzestan
- County: Dezful
- Bakhsh: Sardasht
- Rural District: Ahmadfedaleh

Population (2006)
  - Total: 88
- Time zone: UTC+3:30 (IRST)
  - Summer (DST): UTC+4:30 (IRDT)

Eidi Mordeh-ye Pain (Persian: عيدي مرده پايين, also Romanized as ʿEīdī Mordeh-ye Pā’īn) is a village in Ahmadfedaleh Rural District, Sardasht District, Dezful County, Khuzestan Province, Iran. At the 2006 census, its population was 88, in 14 families.
