= Eidi Mordeh-ye Bala =

Eidi Mordeh-ye Bala عيدي مرده بالا
- Village
- Country: Iran
- Province: Khuzestan
- County: Dezful
- Bakhsh: Sardasht
- Rural District: Ahmadfedaleh

Population (2006)
  - Total: 72
- Time zone: UTC+3:30 (IRST)
  - Summer (DST): UTC+4:30 (IRDT)

Eidi Mordeh-ye Bala (Persian: عيدي مرده بالا, also Romanized as ʿEīdī Mordeh-ye Bālā) is a village in Ahmadfedaleh Rural District, Sardasht District, Dezful County, Khuzestan Province, Iran. At the 2006 census, its population was 72, in 11 families.
