= Mahur Berenji-ye Olya =

Mahur Berenji-ye Olya ماهوربرنجي عليا
- Village
- Location within Iran
- Coordinates: 32°23′32″N 48°39′45″E
- Country: Iran
- Province: Khuzestan
- County: Dezful
- Bakhsh: Sardasht
- Rural District: Mahur Berenji

Population (2006)
  - Total: 169
- Time zone: UTC+3:30 (IRST)
  - Summer (DST): UTC+4:30 (IRDT)

Mahur Berenji-ye Olya (Persian: ماهوربرنجي عليا, also Romanized as Māhūr Berenjī-ye ‘Olyā; also known as Mahoor Berenjī, Māhūr, and Māhūr Berenjī-ye Bālā) is a village in Mahur Berenji Rural District, Sardasht District, Dezful County, Khuzestan Province, Iran. At the 2006 census, its population was 169, in 30 families.
