= Darreh Khoshk-e Jafarvand =

Darreh Khoshk-e Jafarvand دره خشك جافروند
- Village
- Location within Iran
- Coordinates: 32°39′06″N 49°08′43″E
- Country: Iran
- Province: Khuzestan
- County: Dezful
- Bakhsh: Sardasht
- Rural District: Ahmadfedaleh

Population (2006)
  - Total: 19
- Time zone: UTC+3:30 (IRST)
  - Summer (DST): UTC+4:30 (IRDT)

Darreh Khoshk-e Jafarvand (Persian: دره خشك جافروند, also Romanized as Darreh Khoshk-e Jāfarvand; also known as Darreh Khoshk) is a village in Ahmadfedaleh Rural District, Sardasht District, Dezful County, Khuzestan Province, Iran. At the 2006 census, its population was 19, in 5 families.
