= Sar Sardab-e Sofla =

Sar Sardab-e Sofla سرسرداب سفلي
- Village
- Location within Iran
- Coordinates: 32°39′07″N 48°54′03″E
- Country: Iran
- Province: Khuzestan
- County: Dezful
- Bakhsh: Sardasht
- Rural District: Seyyedvaliyeddin

Population (2006)
  - Total: 34
- Time zone: UTC+3:30 (IRST)
  - Summer (DST): UTC+4:30 (IRDT)

Sar Sardab-e Sofla (Persian: سرسرداب سفلي, also Romanized as Sar Sardāb-e Soflá; also known as Sar Sardāb-e Pā'īn) is a village in Seyyedvaliyeddin Rural District, Sardasht District, Dezful County, Khuzestan Province, Iran. At the 2006 census, its population was 34, in 5 families.
