= Azanak-e Kukya =

Azanak-e Kukya ازنك كوكيا
- Village
- Country: Iran
- Province: Khuzestan
- County: Andimeshk
- Bakhsh: Sardasht
- Rural District: Seyyedvaliyeddin

Population (2006)
  - Total: 24
- Time zone: UTC+3:30 (IRST)
  - Summer (DST): UTC+4:30 (IRDT)

Azanak-e Kukya (Persian: ازنك كوكيا, also Romanized as Āzanaḵ-e Kūḵyā) is a village in Seyyedvaliyeddin Rural District, Sardasht District, Andimeshk County, Khuzestan Province, Iran. At the 2006 census, its population was 24, in 4 families.
