= Azanak-e Olya =

Azanak-e Olya ازنك عليا
- Village
- Country: Iran
- Province: Khuzestan
- County: Dezful
- Bakhsh: Sardasht
- Rural District: Seyyedvaliyeddin

Population (2006)
  - Total: 41
- Time zone: UTC+3:30 (IRST)
  - Summer (DST): UTC+4:30 (IRDT)

Azanak-e Olya (Persian: ازنك عليا, also Romanized as Āzanaḵ-e ‘Olyā) is a village in Seyyedvaliyeddin Rural District, Sardasht District, Dezful County, Khuzestan Province, Iran. According to a 2006 census, eight families lived there, consisting of 41 people.
