= Sar Sardab-e Olya =

Village in Khuzestan, Iran

Sar Sardab-e Olya سرسرداب عليا
- Village
- Location within Iran
- Coordinates: 32°39′26″N 48°55′07″E
- Country: Iran
- Province: Khuzestan
- County: Dezful
- Bakhsh: Sardasht
- Rural District: Seyyedvaliyeddin

Population (2006)
  - Total: 66
- Time zone: UTC+3:30 (IRST)
  - Summer (DST): UTC+4:30 (IRDT)

Sar Sardab-e Olya (Persian: سرسرداب عليا, also Romanized as Sar Sardāb-e ‘Olyā; also known as Sar Sardāb-e Bālā) is a village in Seyyedvaliyeddin Rural District, Sardasht District, Dezful County, Khuzestan Province, Iran. At the 2006 census, its population was 66, in 10 families.
