= Sezar (disambiguation) =

Sezar may refer to:

- Sezar, village in Khuzestan, Iran
- Sezar Akgül (born 1988), Turkish professional wrestler

== See also ==
- Caesar (disambiguation)
