= Mahur Berenji-ye Sofla =

Village in Khuzestan province, Iran

Mahur Berenji-ye Sofla Persian: ماهور برنجي سفلي
- Village
- Location within Iran
- Coordinates: 32°22′51″N 48°38′35″E
- Country: Iran
- Province: Khuzestan
- County: Dezful
- District: Sardasht
- Rural District: Mahur Berenji

Population (2016)
  - Total: 1,047
- Time zone: UTC+3:30 (IRST)

Mahur Berenji-ye Sofla (Persian: ماهوربرنجي سفلي) (Note: Also romanized as Māhūr Berenjī-ye Soflá; also known as Mahoor Berenji, Māhūr, and Māhūr Berenjī-ye Pā’īn) is a village in, and the capital of, Mahur Berenji Rural District of Sardasht District, Dezful County, Khuzestan province, Iran.

== Demographics ==
=== Population ===
At the time of the 2006 National Census, the village's population was 835 in 163 households. The following census in 2011 counted 979 people in 239 households. The 2016 census measured the population of the village as 1,047 people in 244 households.
