= Mahur-e Basht =

Mahur-e Basht ماهورباشت
- Village
- Location within Iran
- Coordinates: 30°14′58″N 51°02′41″E
- Country: Iran
- Province: Kohgiluyeh and Boyer-Ahmad
- County: Gachsaran
- Bakhsh: Central
- Rural District: Emamzadeh Jafar

Population (2006)
  - Total: 350
- Time zone: UTC+3:30 (IRST)
  - Summer (DST): UTC+4:30 (IRDT)

Mahur-e Basht (Persian: ماهورباشت, also romanized as Māhūr-e Bāsht) is a village in Emamzadeh Jafar Rural District, in the Central District of Gachsaran County, Kohgiluyeh and Boyer-Ahmad Province, Iran. At the 2006 census, its population was 350, in 79 families.
