= Mazeh Gargasht =

Mazeh Gargasht مازه گرگشت
- Village
- Location within Iran
- Coordinates: 32°02′00″N 48°57′00″E
- Country: Iran
- Province: Khuzestan
- County: Shushtar
- Bakhsh: Central
- Rural District: Shahid Modarres

Population (2006)
  - Total: 18
- Time zone: UTC+3:30 (IRST)
  - Summer (DST): UTC+4:30 (IRDT)

Mazeh Gargasht (Persian: مازه گرگشت, also Romanized as Māzeh Garqash) is a village in Shahid Modarres Rural District, in the Central District of Shushtar County, Khuzestan Province, Iran. At the 2006 census, its population was 18, in 5 families.
