= Darreh Khoshk, Kohgiluyeh and Boyer-Ahmad =

Darreh Khoshk دره خشك
- Village
- Country: Iran
- Province: Kohgiluyeh and Boyer-Ahmad
- County: Dana
- Bakhsh: Central
- Rural District: Tut-e Nadeh

Population (2006)
  - Total: 13
- Time zone: UTC+3:30 (IRST)
  - Summer (DST): UTC+4:30 (IRDT)

Darreh Khoshk (Persian: دره خشك) is a village in Tut-e Nadeh Rural District, in the Central District of Dana County, Kohgiluyeh and Boyer-Ahmad Province, Iran. At the 2006 census, its population was 13, in 4 families.
