= Mazeh Kaz =

Mazeh Kaz مازه كز
- Village
- Location within Iran
- Coordinates: 31°11′17″N 51°04′15″E
- Country: Iran
- Province: Kohgiluyeh and Boyer-Ahmad
- County: Dana
- Bakhsh: Pataveh
- Rural District: Sadat Mahmudi

Population (2006)
  - Total: 237
- Time zone: UTC+3:30 (IRST)
  - Summer (DST): UTC+4:30 (IRDT)

Mazeh Kaz (Persian: مازه كز, also Romanized as Māzeh Kaz; also known as Māzeh Gar, Māzeh Gaz, and Māzgeh) is a village in Sadat Mahmudi Rural District, Pataveh District, Dana County, Kohgiluyeh and Boyer-Ahmad Province, Iran. At the 2006 census, its population was 237, in 39 families.
