= Mahur, Iran =

Mahur ماهور
- Village
- Location within Iran
- Coordinates: 31°27′07″N 48°29′14″E
- Country: Iran
- Province: Khuzestan
- County: Ahvaz
- Bakhsh: Hamidiyeh
- Rural District: Tarrah

Population (2006)
  - Total: 126
- Time zone: UTC+3:30 (IRST)
  - Summer (DST): UTC+4:30 (IRDT)

Mahur (Persian: ماهور, also Romanized as Māhūr; also known as Māleḩ-e Māhūr) is a village in Tarrah Rural District, Hamidiyeh District, Ahvaz County, Khuzestan Province, Iran. At the 2006 census, its population was 126, in 16 families.
