= Darreh Khoshk, Ramhormoz =

Darreh Khoshk دره خشك
- Village
- Location within Iran
- Coordinates: 31°10′18″N 49°54′45″E
- Country: Iran
- Province: Khuzestan
- County: Ramhormoz
- Bakhsh: Central
- Rural District: Abolfares

Population (2006)
  - Total: 85
- Time zone: UTC+3:30 (IRST)
  - Summer (DST): UTC+4:30 (IRDT)

Darreh Khoshk (Persian: دره خشك) is a village in Abolfares Rural District, in the Central District of Ramhormoz County, Khuzestan Province, Iran. At the 2006 census, its population was 85, in 16 families.
