= Ab Difeh, Lorestan =

Ab Difeh آبديفه
- Village
- Location within Iran
- Coordinates: 33°19′00″N 48°27′00″E
- Country: Iran
- Province: Lorestan
- County: Khorramabad
- Bakhsh: Central
- Rural District: Kakasharaf

Population (2006)
  - Total: 125
- Time zone: UTC+3:30 (IRST)
  - Summer (DST): UTC+4:30 (IRDT)

Ab Difeh (Persian: آبديفه, also romanized as Āb Dīfeh) is a village in Kakasharaf Rural District, in the Central District of Khorramabad County, Lorestan province, Iran. At the 2006 census, its population was 125, in 27 families.
