= Mahur-e Chah Gandali =

Mahur-e Chah Gandali ماهورچاه گندلي
- Village
- Location within Iran
- Coordinates: 32°04′00″N 49°10′00″E
- Country: Iran
- Province: Khuzestan
- County: Shushtar
- Bakhsh: Central
- Rural District: Shahid Modarres

Population (2006)
  - Total: 130
- Time zone: UTC+3:30 (IRST)
  - Summer (DST): UTC+4:30 (IRDT)

Mahur-e Chah Gandali (Persian: ماهورچاه گندلي, also Romanized as Māhūr-e Chāh Gandalī) is a village in Shahid Modarres Rural District, in the Central District of Shushtar County, Khuzestan Province, Iran. At the 2006 census, its population was 130, in 22 families.
