= Shavit 2 (sounding rocket) =

Israeli meteorological space rocket

Shavit 2 (Hebrew: "comet" - 2 שביט) was the first Israeli sounding rocket, launched on 5 July 1961 for meteorological research.

The weight of Shavit 2 was 250 kg and its height was 3.76 metres. The rocket achieved a height of 80 km.

The Shavit sounding rocket is distinct from the later Shavit 2 space launch vehicle also produced by Israel to launch Ofeq reconnaissance satellites into low Earth orbit beginning in September 1988.
