= Shahiyun District =

District in Khuzestan province, Iran

Shahiyun District Persian: بخش شهیون
- District
- Location within Iran
- Coordinates: 32°42′40″N 49°00′15″E
- Country: Iran
- Province: Khuzestan
- County: Dezful
- Capital: Shahiyun

Population (2016)
  - Total: 11,529
- Time zone: UTC+3:30 (IRST)

Shahiyun District (Persian: بخش شهیون) is in Dezful County, Khuzestan province province, Iran. Its capital is the city of Shahiyun.

== History ==
After the 2006 National Census, five rural districts were separated from Sardasht District in the formation of Shahiyun District. After the 2016 census, the village of Shahiyun was elevated to the status of a city.

== Demographics ==
=== Population ===
At the time of the 2011 census, the district's population was 7,272 people in 1,552 households. The 2016 census measured the population of the district as 11,529 inhabitants in 2,677 households.

=== Administrative divisions ===
Shahiyun District Population
Administrative Divisions	2011	2016
Ahmad Fedaleh RD	1,201	3,227
Darreh Kayad RD	1,213	2,501
Emamzadeh Seyyed Mahmud RD	651	1,250
Seyyed Vali ol Din RD	1,471	1,613
Shahi RD	2,736	2,938
Shahiyun (city) (Note: Became a city after the 2016 census)		
Total	7,272	11,529
RD = Rural District
