= Emamzadeh Seyyed Mahmud Rural District =

Rural district in Khuzestan province, Iran

Emamzadeh Seyyed Mahmud Rural District Persian: دهستان امامزاده سيدمحمود
- Rural District
- Location within Iran
- Coordinates: 32°46′01″N 48°54′26″E
- Country: Iran
- Province: Khuzestan
- County: Dezful
- District: Shahiyun
- Capital: Shavi

Population (2016)
  - Total: 1,250
- Time zone: UTC+3:30 (IRST)

Emamzadeh Seyyed Mahmud Rural District (Persian: دهستان امامزاده سيدمحمود) is in Shahiyun District of Dezful County, Khuzestan province, Iran. Its capital is the village of Shavi.

== Demographics ==
=== Population ===
At the time of the 2006 National Census, the rural district's population (as a part of Sardasht District) was 1,304 in 213 households. There were 651 inhabitants in 126 households at the following census of 2011, by which time the rural district had been separated from the district in the establishment of Shahiyun District. The 2016 census measured the population of the rural district as 1,250 in 282 households. The most populous of its 80 villages was Kharmizan, with 202 people.
