= Mahur Berenji Rural District =

Rural district in Khuzestan province, Iran

Mahur Berenji Rural District Persian: دهستان ماهور برنجی
- Rural District
- Location within Iran
- Coordinates: 32°22′36″N 48°37′31″E
- Country: Iran
- Province: Khuzestan
- County: Dezful
- District: Sardasht
- Capital: Mahur Berenji-ye Sofla

Population (2016)
  - Total: 13,988
- Time zone: UTC+3:30 (IRST)

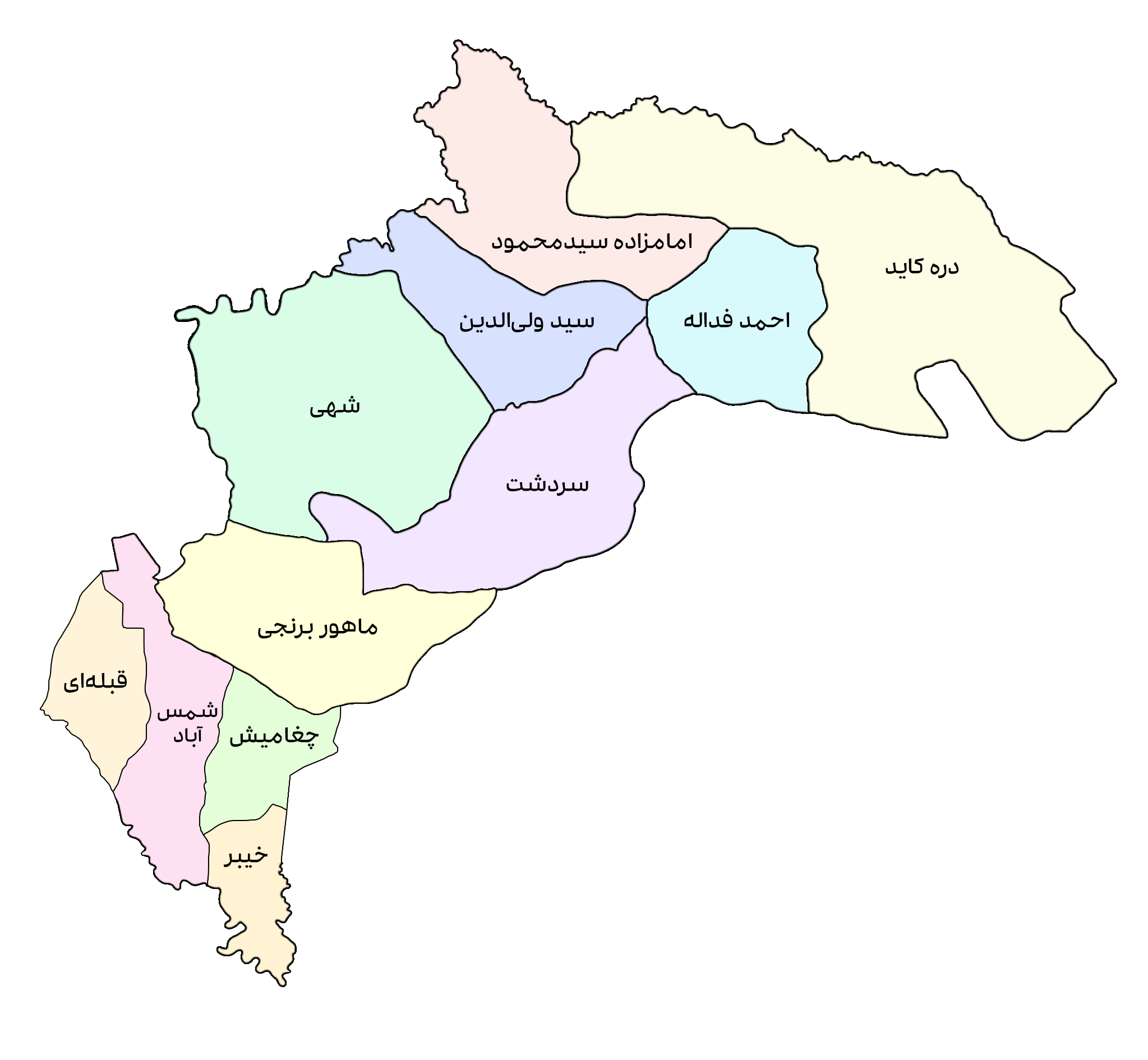
Dezful County villages map

Mahur Berenji Rural District (Persian: دهستان ماهور برنجی) is in Sardasht District of Dezful County, Khuzestan province, Iran. Its capital is the village of Mahur Berenji-ye Sofla.

== Demographics ==
=== Population ===
At the time of the 2006 National Census, the rural district's population was 17,748 in 3,362 households. There were 22,089 inhabitants in 4,977 households at the following census of 2011. The 2016 census measured the population of the rural district as 13,988 in 2,916 households. The most populous of its 57 villages was Boneh-ye Hoseyn Kaluli, with 3,170 people.
