= Shahi Rural District =

Rural district in Khuzestan province, Iran

Shahi Rural District Persian: دهستان شهی
- Rural District
- Location within Iran
- Coordinates: 32°35′30″N 48°37′25″E
- Country: Iran
- Province: Khuzestan
- County: Dezful
- District: Shahiyun
- Capital: Shahiyun

Population (2016)
  - Total: 2,938
- Time zone: UTC+3:30 (IRST)

Shahi Rural District (Persian: دهستان شهی) is in Shahiyun District of Dezful County, Khuzestan province, Iran. It is administered from the city of Shahiyun.

== Demographics ==
=== Population ===
At the time of the 2006 National Census, the rural district's population (as a part of Sardasht District) was 3,370 in 637 households. There were 2,736 inhabitants in 624 households at the following census of 2011, by which time the rural district had been separated from the district in the formation of Shahiyun District. The 2016 census measured the population of the rural district as 2,938 in 748 households. The most populous of its 91 villages was Chagah, with 285 people.
