= Ahmad Fedaleh Rural District =

Rural district in Khuzestan province, Iran

Ahmad Fedaleh Rural District Persian: دهستان احمد فداله
- Rural District
- Location within Iran
- Coordinates: 32°41′29″N 49°06′41″E
- Country: Iran
- Province: Khuzestan
- County: Dezful
- District: Shahiyun
- Capital: Emamzadeh-ye Fedaleh-ye Amran

Population (2016)
  - Total: 3,227
- Time zone: UTC+3:30 (IRST)

Ahmad Fedaleh Rural District (Persian: دهستان احمد فداله) is in Shahiyun District of Dezful County, Khuzestan province, Iran. Its capital is the village of Emamzadeh-ye Fedaleh-ye Amran (امامزاده فداله عمران).

== Demographics ==
=== Population ===
At the time of the 2006 National Census, the rural district's population (as a part of Sardasht District) was 1,488 in 245 households. There were 1,201 inhabitants in 233 households at the following census of 2011, by which time the rural district had been separated from the district in the formation of Shahiyun District. The 2016 census measured the population of the rural district as 3,227 in 733 households. The most populous of its 57 villages was Emamzadeh Ahmad Fedaleh, with 252 people.
