= Darreh Kayad Rural District =

Rural district in Khuzestan province, Iran

Darreh Kayad Rural District Persian: دهستان دره كايد
- Rural District
- Location within Iran
- Coordinates: 32°44′42″N 49°14′10″E
- Country: Iran
- Province: Khuzestan
- County: Dezful
- District: Shahiyun
- Capital: Kul Sira

Population (2016)
  - Total: 2,501
- Time zone: UTC+3:30 (IRST)

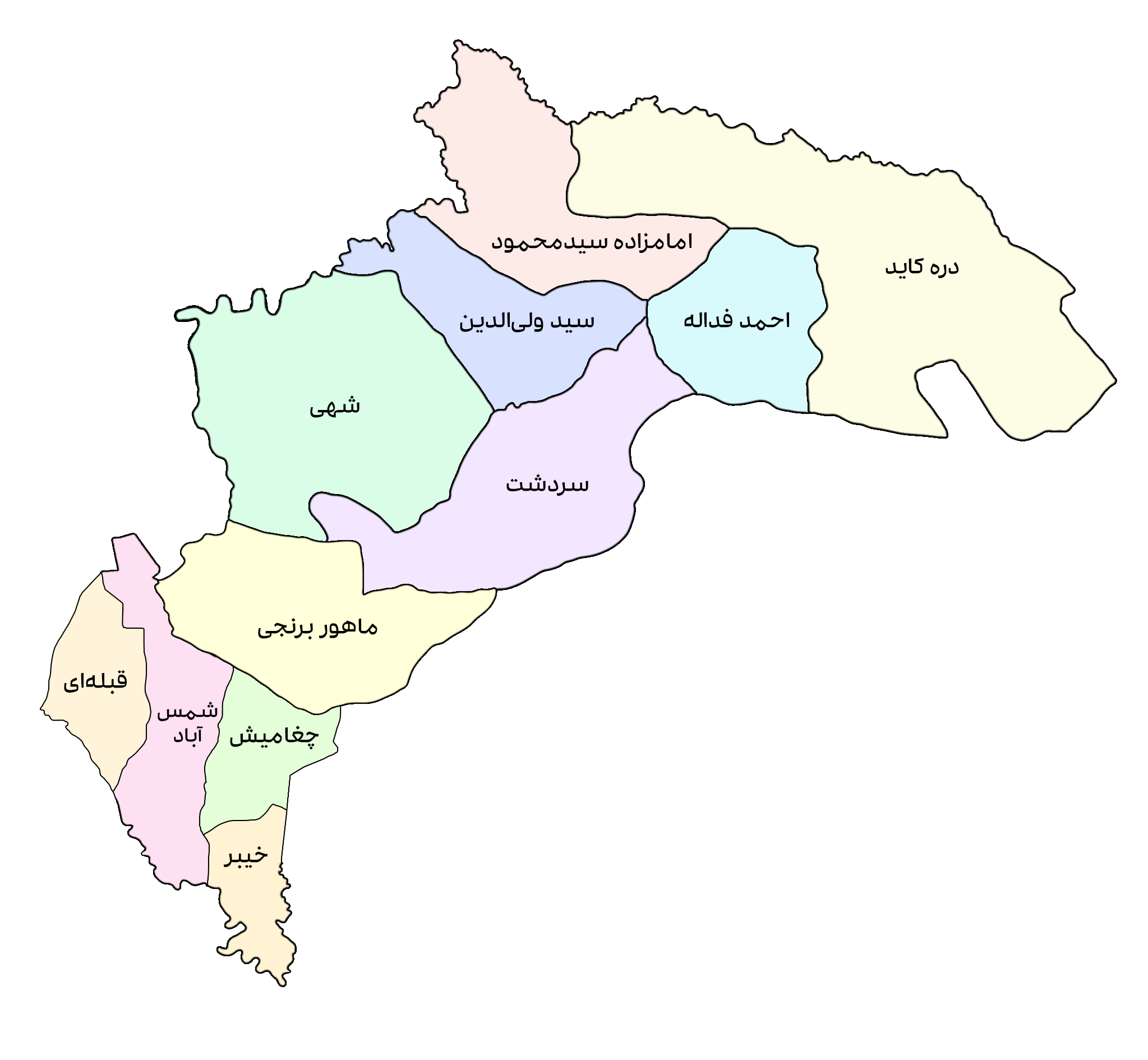
Dezful County

Darreh Kayad Rural District (Persian: دهستان دره كايد) is in Shahiyun District of Dezful County, Khuzestan province, Iran. Its capital is the village of Kul Sira.

== Demographics ==
=== Population ===
At the time of the 2006 National Census, the rural district's population (as a part of Sardasht District) was 1,840 in 316 households. There were 1,213 inhabitants in 259 households at the following census of 2011, by which time the rural district had been separated from the district in the formation of Shahiyun District. The 2016 census measured the population of the rural district as 2,501 in 549 households. The most populous of its 79 villages was Labab, with 255 people.
