= Seyyed Vali ol Din Rural District =

Rural district in Khuzestan province, Iran

Seyyed Vali ol Din Rural District Persian: دهستان سيد ولی‌الدين
- Rural District
- Location within Iran
- Coordinates: 32°41′34″N 48°48′38″E
- Country: Iran
- Province: Khuzestan
- County: Dezful
- District: Shahiyun
- Capital: Gusheh

Population (2016)
  - Total: 1,613
- Time zone: UTC+3:30 (IRST)

Seyyed Vali ol Din Rural District (Persian: دهستان سيد ولی‌الدين) is in Shahiyun District of Dezful County, Khuzestan province, Iran. Its capital is the village of Gusheh.

== Demographics ==
=== Population ===
At the time of the 2006 National Census, the rural district's population (as a part of Sardasht District) was 2,804 in 483 households. There were 1,471 inhabitants in 310 households at the following census of 2011, by which time the rural district had been separated from the district in the establishment of Shahiyun District. The 2016 census measured the population of the rural district as 1,613 in 365 households. The most populous of its 116 villages was Bar Aftab-e Olya, with 171 people.
