= Sardasht District =

District in Khuzestan province, Iran

Sardasht District Persian: بخش سردشت
- District
- Location within Iran
- Coordinates: 32°29′N 48°48′E
- Country: Iran
- Province: Khuzestan
- County: Dezful
- Capital: Saland

Population (2016)
  - Total: 27,726
- Time zone: UTC+3:30 (IRST)

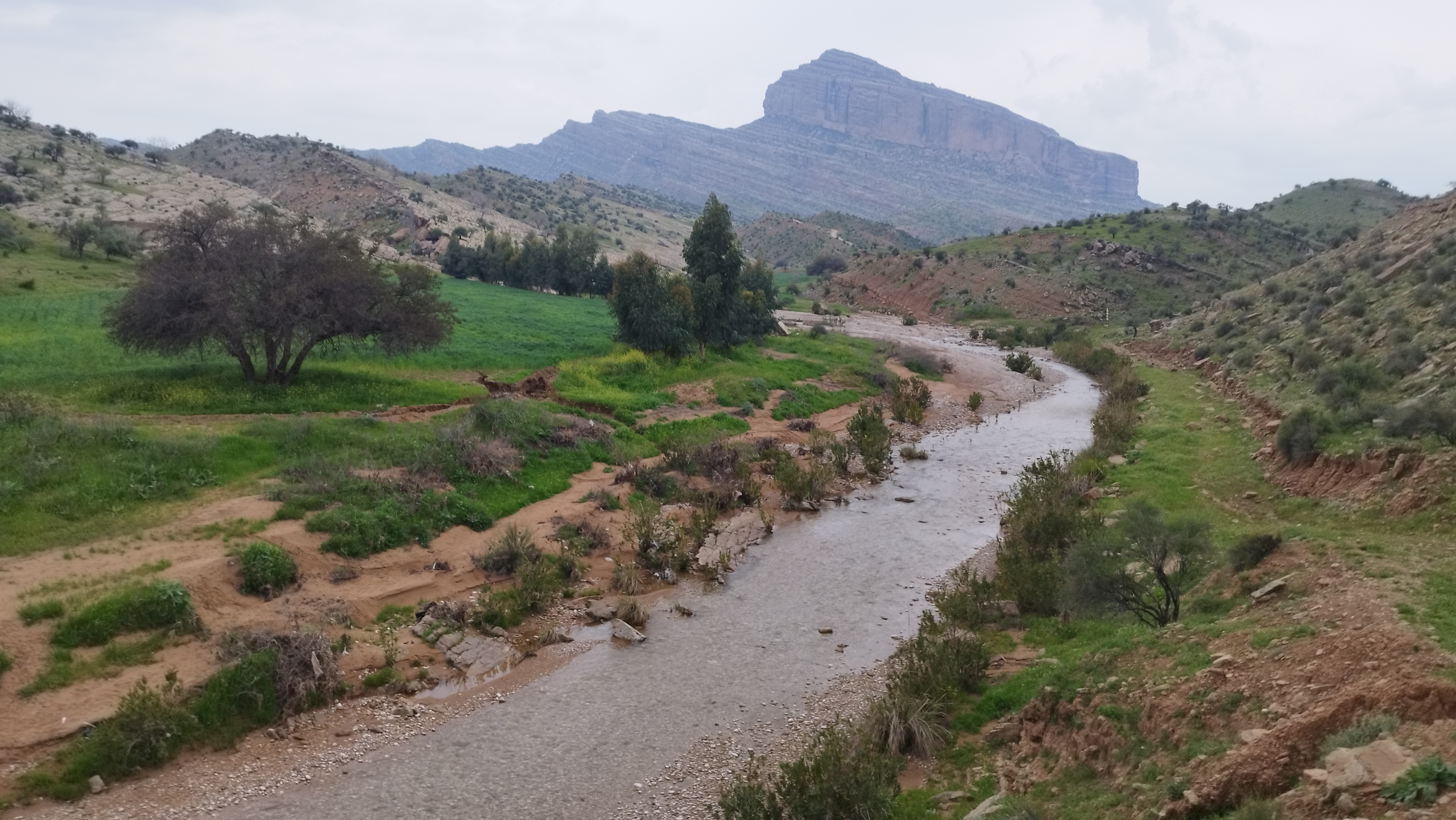
A photo inside Sardasht

Sardasht District (Persian: بخش سردشت) is in Dezful County, Khuzestan province, Iran. Its capital is the city of Saland. (Note: Formerly Sardasht)

== History ==
After the 2006 National Census, five rural districts were separated from the district in the establishment of Shahiyun District. In addition, the village of Shahrak-e Hamzeh was elevated to city status as Hamzeh.

== Demographics ==
=== Population ===
At the time of the 2006 census, Sardasht District's population was 35,246 in 6,536 households. The following census in 2011 counted 24,149 people in 7,567 households. The 2016 census measured the population of the district as 27,726 inhabitants in 6,309 households.

=== Administrative divisions ===
Sardasht District Population
Administrative Divisions	2006	2011	2016
Ahmad Fedaleh RD (Note: Transferred to Shahiyun District)	1,488		
Darreh Kayad RD	1,840		
Emamzadeh Seyyed Mahmud RD	1,304		
Mahur Berenji RD	17,748	22,089	13,988
Sardasht RD	4,851	4,125	5,087
Seyyed Vali ol Din RD	2,804		
Shahi RD	3,370		
Hamzeh (city) (Note: Formerly the village of Shahrak-e Hamzeh)		5,850	6,091
Saland (city)	1,841	2,085	2,560
Total	35,246	34,149	27,726
RD = Rural District
