= Khasraj =

Khasraj (Persian: خسرج) may refer to:

- Khasraj-e Beyt-e Qashem
- Khasraj-e Khalaf
- Khasraj-e Mezban
- Khasraj-e Owdeh
- Khasraj-e Razi Mohammad
