= Ashireh =

Ashireh (Persian: عشيره) may refer to:

- Ashireh-ye Khalaf
- Ashireh-ye Qazban
- Ashireh-ye Seyyed Jaber
- Ashireh-ye Seyyed Majid
