= Dehkadeh =

Dehkadeh or Deh Kadeh or Deh-e Kadeh (Persian: دهكده) may refer to:

- Dehkadeh-ye Taleqani, Alborz Province
- Dehkadeh, Kerman
- Dehkadeh, Khuzestan
- Dehkadeh Rural District, an administrative division of Hamidiyeh County, Khuzestan province, Iran
- Dehkadeh-ye Towhid, Tehran Province
- Dehkadeh Olampik, Tehran Province
