= Alavoneh-ye Fay =

Village in Khuzestan province, Iran

Alavoneh-ye Fay Persian: علاونه فاي
- Village
- Location within Iran
- Coordinates: 31°33′05″N 48°26′19″E
- Country: Iran
- Province: Khuzestan
- County: Hamidiyeh
- District: Central
- Rural District: Karkheh

Population (2016)
  - Total: 2,158
- Time zone: UTC+3:30 (IRST)

Alavoneh-ye Fay (Persian: علاونه فاي) (Note: Also romanized as ‘Alāvoneh-ye Fāy; also known as Fāy and Olfāy-e ‘Alāvoneh) is a village in, and the capital of, Karkheh Rural District of the Central District of Hamidiyeh County, Khuzestan province, Iran. The previous capital of the rural district was the village of Dehkadeh.

== Demographics ==
=== Population ===
At the time of the 2006 National Census, the village's population was 1,633 in 253 households, when it was in the former Hamidiyeh District of Ahvaz County. The following census in 2011 counted 1,776 people in 464 households. The 2016 census measured the population of the village as 2,158 people in 629 households, by which time the district had been separated from the county in the establishment of Hamidiyeh County. The rural district was transferred to the new Central District. It was the most populous village in its rural district.
