= Dehkadeh, Khuzestan =

Village in Khuzestan province, Iran

Dehkadeh Persian: دهكده
- Village
- Location within Iran
- Coordinates: 31°27′54″N 48°27′43″E
- Country: Iran
- Province: Khuzestan
- County: Hamidiyeh
- District: Central
- Rural District: Dehkadeh

Population (2016)
  - Total: 2,951
- Time zone: UTC+3:30 (IRST)

Dehkadeh (Persian: دهكده) is a village in, and the capital of, Dehkadeh Rural District of the Central District of Hamidiyeh County, Khuzestan province, Iran. It served as the capital of Karkheh Rural District until its capital was transferred to the village of Alavoneh-ye Fay. At the same time Dehkadeh became the capital of the new Tarrah Rural District until its capital was transferred to Tarrah-e Yek. Dehkadeh then became the capital of the new Dehkadeh Rural District.

== Demographics ==
=== Population ===
At the time of the 2006 National Census, the village's population was 2,592 in 490 households, when it was in Tarrah Rural District of the former Hamidiyeh District of Ahvaz County. The following census in 2011 counted 2,890 people in 612 households. The 2016 census measured the population of the village as 2,951 people in 773 households, by which time the district had been separated from the county in the establishment of Hamidiyeh County. The rural district was transferred to the new Gambueh District, and Dehkadeh was transferred to Dehkadeh Rural District created in the new Central District. It was the most populous village in its rural district.
