= Kuheh =

Kuheh (Persian: كوهه) may refer to:

- Kuheh, Isfahan
- Kuheh, Kerman
- Kuheh 1, Khuzestan Province
- Kuheh 2, Khuzestan Province
