= Tarrah =

Tarrah may refer to:

- Tarrah-e Yek, a village in Iran
- Tarrah-e Do, a village in Iran
- Tarrah Rural District, an administrative subdivision of Iran
- Tarrah Harvey (b. 1989), Canadian ice dancer
