= Gowd-e Hadi =

Gowd-e Hadi گودهادي
- Village
- Country: Iran
- Province: Kerman
- County: Sirjan
- Bakhsh: Pariz
- Rural District: Pariz

Population (2006)
  - Total: 12
- Time zone: UTC+3:30 (IRST)
  - Summer (DST): UTC+4:30 (IRDT)

Gowd-e Hadi (Persian: گودهادي, also Romanized as Gowd-e Hādī) is a village in Pariz Rural District, Pariz District, Sirjan County, Kerman Province, Iran. At the 2006 census, its population was 12, in 5 families.
