= Showq =

Showq (Persian: شوق), also rendered as Shogh, may refer to:

- Showq-e Olya
- Showq-e Sofla
