= Now Qand =

Now Qand or Naughand or Now Ghand (Persian: نوقند) may refer to:

- Now Qand, Kerman
- Now Qand, South Khorasan
