= Magtaf =

Magtaf مگتاف
- Village
- Location within Iran
- Coordinates: 31°27′17″N 48°29′15″E
- Country: Iran
- Province: Khuzestan
- County: Ahvaz
- Bakhsh: Hamidiyeh
- Rural District: Tarrah

Population (2006)
  - Total: 82
- Time zone: UTC+3:30 (IRST)
  - Summer (DST): UTC+4:30 (IRDT)

Magtaf (Persian: مگتاف, also Romanized as Magtāf; also known as Maktāf, Mektāf, and Moktāf) is a village in Tarrah Rural District, Hamidiyeh District, Ahvaz County, Khuzestan Province, Iran. At the 2006 census, its population was 82, in 20 families.
