= Deh-e Morghi =

Deh-e Morghi ده مرغي
- Village
- Location within Iran
- Coordinates: 29°42′28″N 55°46′20″E
- Country: Iran
- Province: Kerman
- County: Sirjan
- Bakhsh: Pariz
- Rural District: Saadatabad

Population (2006)
  - Total: 121
- Time zone: UTC+3:30 (IRST)
  - Summer (DST): UTC+4:30 (IRDT)

Deh-e Morghi (Persian: ده مرغي, also Romanized as Deh-e Morghī and Deh Morghī; also known as Morghi Deh Morghi) is a village in Saadatabad Rural District, Pariz District, Sirjan County, Kerman Province, Iran. At the 2006 census, its population was 121, in 35 families.
