= Albumraveh Shamkoli =

Albumraveh Shamkoli البومروح شمكلي
- Village
- Location within Iran
- Coordinates: 31°37′24″N 48°32′43″E
- Country: Iran
- Province: Khuzestan
- County: Ahvaz
- Bakhsh: Hamidiyeh
- Rural District: Karkheh

Population (2006)
  - Total: 288
- Time zone: UTC+3:30 (IRST)
  - Summer (DST): UTC+4:30 (IRDT)

Albumraveh Shamkoli (Persian: البومروح شمكلي, also Romanized as Ālbūmraveḥ Shamḵolī; also known as Albamrāveh, Al Bamrūḩ Shaljeh, and Albomāveh) is a village in Karkheh Rural District, Hamidiyeh District, Ahvaz County, Khuzestan Province, Iran. At the 2006 census, its population was 288, in 44 families.
