= Shobeliyeh =

Village in Khuzestan Province, Iran, with population

Shobeliyeh شبليه
- Village
- Location within Iran
- Coordinates: 31°21′59″N 48°29′54″E
- Country: Iran
- Province: Khuzestan
- County: Ahvaz
- Bakhsh: Hamidiyeh
- Rural District: Jahad

Population (2006)
  - Total: 339
- Time zone: UTC+3:30 (IRST)
  - Summer (DST): UTC+4:30 (IRDT)

Shobeliyeh (Persian: شبليه, also Romanized as Shobelīyeh; also known as Shobeylīyeh and Shobeylīyeh-ye Do) is a village in Jahad Rural District, Hamidiyeh District, Ahvaz County, Khuzestan Province, Iran. At the 2006 census, its population was 339, in 62 families.
