= Sheykh Zaharav =

Sheykh Zaharav شيخ زهراو
- Village
- Country: Iran
- Province: Khuzestan
- County: Ahvaz
- Bakhsh: Hamidiyeh
- Rural District: Karkheh

Population (2006)
  - Total: 1,960
- Time zone: UTC+3:30 (IRST)
  - Summer (DST): UTC+4:30 (IRDT)

Sheykh Zaharav (Persian: شيخ زهراو, also Romanized as Sheykh Zaharāv) is a village in Karkheh Rural District, Hamidiyeh District, Ahvaz County, Khuzestan Province, Iran. During the 2006 census, its population was 1,960, in 302 families.
