= Kesmun =

Kesmun كسمون
- Village
- Location within Iran
- Coordinates: 29°49′15″N 55°54′41″E
- Country: Iran
- Province: Kerman
- County: Sirjan
- Bakhsh: Pariz
- Rural District: Saadatabad

Population (2006)
  - Total: 17
- Time zone: UTC+3:30 (IRST)
  - Summer (DST): UTC+4:30 (IRDT)

Kesmun (Persian: كسمون, also Romanized as Kesmūn; also known as Gesmān and Kesmān) is a village in Saadatabad Rural District, Pariz District, Sirjan County, Kerman Province, Iran. At the 2006 census, its population was 17, in 6 families.
