= Yahyaabad, Pariz =

Neighborhood in Kerman province, Iran

Yahyaabad Persian: يحيي اباد
- Neighborhood
- Location within Iran
- Coordinates: 29°38′35″N 55°49′26″E
- Country: Iran
- Province: Kerman
- County: Sirjan
- District: Pariz
- City: Hamashahr

Population (2006)
  - Total: 565
- Time zone: UTC+3:30 (IRST)

Yahyaabad (Persian: يحيي اباد) (Note: Also romanized as Yaḩyáābād) is a neighborhood in the city of Hamashahr in Pariz District of Sirjan County, Kerman province, Iran.

== Demographics ==
=== Population ===
At the time of the 2006 National Census, Yahyaabad's population was 565 in 128 households, when it was a village in Saadatabad Rural District.

== History ==
In 2011, the village of Saadatabad was merged with the villages of Deh Now, Dowlatabad, Hoseynabad-e Do, and Yahyaabad to become the city of Hamashahr.
