= Bagh-e Khoshk =

Bagh-e Khoshk باغ خشك
- Village
- Location within Iran
- Coordinates: 29°48′53″N 55°58′59″E
- Country: Iran
- Province: Kerman
- County: Sirjan
- Bakhsh: Pariz
- Rural District: Saadatabad

Population (2006)
  - Total: 155
- Time zone: UTC+3:30 (IRST)
  - Summer (DST): UTC+4:30 (IRDT)

Bagh-e Khoshk (Persian: باغ خشك, also Romanized as Bāgh-e Khoshk and Bāgh Khoshk) is a village in Saadatabad Rural District, Pariz District, Sirjan County, Kerman Province, Iran. At the 2006 census, its population was 155, in 40 families.
