= Jirestan =

Jirestan جيرستان
- Village
- Location within Iran
- Coordinates: 29°48′58″N 55°46′33″E
- Country: Iran
- Province: Kerman
- County: Sirjan
- Bakhsh: Pariz
- Rural District: Pariz

Population (2006)
  - Total: 91
- Time zone: UTC+3:30 (IRST)
  - Summer (DST): UTC+4:30 (IRDT)

Jirestan (Persian: جيرستان, also Romanized as Jīrestān) is a village in Pariz Rural District, Pariz District, Sirjan County, Kerman Province, Iran. At the 2006 census, its population was 91, in 25 families.
