= Gambueh =

Gambueh or Gombueh (Persian: گمبوعه) may refer to:

- Gambueh-ye Bozorg
- Gambueh-ye Kuchek
