= Beyt-e Shukaiyeh =

Beyt-e Shukaiyeh بيت شوكايه
- Village
- Country: Iran
- Province: Khuzestan
- County: Ahvaz
- Bakhsh: Hamidiyeh
- Rural District: Karkheh

Population (2006)
  - Total: 120
- Time zone: UTC+3:30 (IRST)
  - Summer (DST): UTC+4:30 (IRDT)

Beyt-e Shukaiyeh (Persian: بيت شوكايه, also Romanized as Beyt-e Shūḵāīyeh) is a village in Karkheh Rural District, Hamidiyeh District, Ahvaz County, Khuzestan Province, Iran. At the 2006 census, its population was 120, in 17 families.
