= Hammad, Ahvaz =

Hammad حماد
- Village
- Location within Iran
- Coordinates: 31°24′11″N 48°27′24″E
- Country: Iran
- Province: Khuzestan
- County: Ahvaz
- Bakhsh: Hamidiyeh
- Rural District: Tarrah

Population (2006)
  - Total: 309
- Time zone: UTC+3:30 (IRST)
  - Summer (DST): UTC+4:30 (IRDT)

Hammad (Persian: حماد, also Romanized as Ḩammād, Hammād, and Ḩamād; also known as Ḩamād-e Seyyed Sattār) is a village in Tarrah Rural District, Hamidiyeh District, Ahvaz County, Khuzestan Province, Iran. At the 2006 census, its population was 309, in 44 families.
