= Horijeh =

Horijeh حريجه
- Village
- Location within Iran
- Coordinates: 31°20′54″N 48°26′58″E
- Country: Iran
- Province: Khuzestan
- County: Ahvaz
- Bakhsh: Hamidiyeh
- Rural District: Jahad

Population (2006)
  - Total: 246
- Time zone: UTC+3:30 (IRST)
  - Summer (DST): UTC+4:30 (IRDT)

Horijeh (Persian: حريجه, also Romanized as Ḩorījeh and Ḩarījeh) is a village in Jahad Rural District, Hamidiyeh District, Ahvaz County, Khuzestan Province, Iran. At the 2006 census, its population was 246, in 36 families.
