= Hendim =

Hendim هنديم
- Village
- Location within Iran
- Coordinates: 29°47′34″N 55°45′24″E
- Country: Iran
- Province: Kerman
- County: Sirjan
- Bakhsh: Pariz
- Rural District: Saadatabad

Population (2006)
  - Total: 37
- Time zone: UTC+3:30 (IRST)
  - Summer (DST): UTC+4:30 (IRDT)

Hendim (Persian: هنديم, also Romanized as Hendīm and Handīm) is a village in Saadatabad Rural District, Pariz District, Sirjan County, Kerman Province, Iran. At the 2006 census, its population was 37, in 9 families.
