= Vasileh Yek =

Vasileh Yek وسيله يك
- Village
- Location within Iran
- Coordinates: 31°33′00″N 48°26′33″E
- Country: Iran
- Province: Khuzestan
- County: Ahvaz
- Bakhsh: Hamidiyeh
- Rural District: Karkheh

Population (2006)
  - Total: 158
- Time zone: UTC+3:30 (IRST)
  - Summer (DST): UTC+4:30 (IRDT)

Vasileh Yek (Persian: وسيله يك, also Romanized as Vasīleh Yek) is a village in Karkheh Rural District, Hamidiyeh District, Ahvaz County, Khuzestan Province, Iran. At the 2006 census, its population was 158, in 21 families.
