= Ramseh =

Ramseh (Persian: رامسه) may refer to:

- Ramseh 1
- Ramseh 2
