= Albuid-e Yek Nabi =

Albuid-e Yek Nabi البوعيديك نبي
- Village
- Location within Iran
- Coordinates: 31°35′36″N 48°31′58″E
- Country: Iran
- Province: Khuzestan
- County: Ahvaz
- Bakhsh: Hamidiyeh
- Rural District: Karkheh

Population (2006)
  - Total: 428
- Time zone: UTC+3:30 (IRST)
  - Summer (DST): UTC+4:30 (IRDT)

Albuid-e Yek Nabi (Persian: البوعيديك نبي, also Romanized as Ālbūʿīd-e Yek Nabī; also known as Alba‘īd-e Yek) is a village in Karkheh Rural District, Hamidiyeh District, Ahvaz County, Khuzestan Province, Iran. At the 2006 census, its population was 428, in 49 families.
