= Pesujban =

Pesujban پسوجبان
- Village
- Location within Iran
- Coordinates: 29°48′59″N 55°47′29″E
- Country: Iran
- Province: Kerman
- County: Sirjan
- Bakhsh: Pariz
- Rural District: Pariz

Population (2006)
  - Total: 332
- Time zone: UTC+3:30 (IRST)
  - Summer (DST): UTC+4:30 (IRDT)

Pesujban (Persian: پسوجبان, also Romanized as Pesūjbān; also known as Pasoojan, Pasūjān, and Pesūjān) is a village in Pariz Rural District, Pariz District, Sirjan County, Kerman Province, Iran. At the 2006 census, its population was 332, in 100 families.
