= Toveybeh-ye Sheykh Hatam =

Toveybeh-ye Sheykh Hatam طويبه شيخ حاتم
- Village
- Location within Iran
- Coordinates: 31°21′55″N 48°33′03″E
- Country: Iran
- Province: Khuzestan
- County: Ahvaz
- Bakhsh: Hamidiyeh
- Rural District: Jahad

Population (2006)
  - Total: 185
- Time zone: UTC+3:30 (IRST)
  - Summer (DST): UTC+4:30 (IRDT)

Toveybeh-ye Sheykh Hatam (Persian: طويبه شيخ حاتم, also Romanized as Ţoveybeh-ye Sheykh Ḩātam; also known as Ţove'ībeh) is a village in Jahad Rural District, Hamidiyeh District, Ahvaz County, Khuzestan Province, Iran. At the 2006 census, its population was 185, in 41 families.
