= Hamadan Seljeh =

Hamadan Seljeh حمدان سلجه
- Village
- Location within Iran
- Coordinates: 31°35′51″N 48°32′17″E
- Country: Iran
- Province: Khuzestan
- County: Ahvaz
- Bakhsh: Hamidiyeh
- Rural District: Karkheh

Population (2006)
  - Total: 103
- Time zone: UTC+3:30 (IRST)
  - Summer (DST): UTC+4:30 (IRDT)

Hamadan Seljeh (Persian: حمدان سلجه, also Romanized as Ḩamadān Seljeh; also known as Salijeh, Seljeh-e Yek, and Soljeh-ye Yek) is a village in Karkheh Rural District, Hamidiyeh District, Ahvaz County, Khuzestan Province, Iran. At the 2006 census, its population was 103, in 17 families.
