= Qanat-e Tut =

Qanat-e Tut قنات توت
- Village
- Location within Iran
- Coordinates: 29°42′48″N 55°49′28″E
- Country: Iran
- Province: Kerman
- County: Sirjan
- Bakhsh: Pariz
- Rural District: Saadatabad

Population (2006)
  - Total: 79
- Time zone: UTC+3:30 (IRST)
  - Summer (DST): UTC+4:30 (IRDT)

Qanat-e Tut (Persian: قنات توت, also Romanized as Qanāt-e Tūt and Qanāt Tūt; also known as Ghanat Toot) is a village in Saadatabad Rural District, Pariz District, Sirjan County, Kerman Province, Iran. At the 2006 census, its population was 79, in 23 families.
