= Tarrah-e Yek =

Village in Khuzestan province, Iran

Tarrah-e Yek Persian: طراح يك
- Village
- Location within Iran
- Coordinates: 31°25′17″N 48°23′18″E
- Country: Iran
- Province: Khuzestan
- County: Hamidiyeh
- District: Gambueh
- Rural District: Tarrah

Population (2016)
  - Total: 1,619
- Time zone: UTC+3:30 (IRST)

Tarrah-e Yek (Persian: طراح يك) (Note: Also romanized as Ţarrāḩ-e Yek; also known as Ţarāh, Ţarrāḩ, Ţarraḩ Seyyed ‘Alī, and Ţarrāh-e Seyyed ‘Alī) is a village in, and the capital of, Tarrah Rural District of Gambueh District, Hamidiyeh County, Khuzestan province, Iran. The previous capital of the rural district was the village of Dehkadeh.

== Demographics ==
=== Population ===
At the time of the 2006 National Census, the village's population was 1,370 in 189 households, when it was in the former Hamidiyeh District of Ahvaz County. The following census in 2011 counted 1,383 people in 284 households. The 2016 census measured the population of the village as 1,619 people in 416 households, by which time the district had been separated from the county in the establishment of Hamidiyeh County. The rural district was transferred to the new Gambueh District. It was the most populous village in its rural district.
