= Sheykh Tomeh =

Sheykh Tomeh شيخ طعمه
- Village
- Location within Iran
- Coordinates: 31°40′08″N 48°32′18″E
- Country: Iran
- Province: Khuzestan
- County: Ahvaz
- Bakhsh: Hamidiyeh
- Rural District: Karkheh

Population (2006)
  - Total: 1,292
- Time zone: UTC+3:30 (IRST)
  - Summer (DST): UTC+4:30 (IRDT)

Sheykh Tomeh (Persian: شيخ طعمه, also Romanized as Sheykh Ţo‘meh)is a village in Karkheh Rural District, Hamidiyeh District, Ahvaz County, Khuzestan Province, Iran. At the 2006 census, its population was 1,292, in 196 families.
