= Hoveysh =

Hoveysh حويش
- Village
- Location within Iran
- Coordinates: 31°36′23″N 48°33′37″E
- Country: Iran
- Province: Khuzestan
- County: Ahvaz
- Bakhsh: Hamidiyeh
- Rural District: Karkheh

Population (2006)
  - Total: 94
- Time zone: UTC+3:30 (IRST)
  - Summer (DST): UTC+4:30 (IRDT)

Hoveysh (Persian: حويش, also Romanized as Ḩoveysh; also known as Khvīsh) is a village in Karkheh Rural District, Hamidiyeh District, Ahvaz County, Khuzestan Province, Iran. At the 2006 census, its population was 94, in 15 families.
