= Shartaq =

Shartaq (Persian: شرطاق) may refer to:

- Shartaq 1
- Shartaq 2
