= Hasanabad-e Yek, Saadatabad =

Hasanabad-e Yek حسن اباد 1
- Village
- Location within Iran
- Coordinates: 29°37′30″N 55°50′09″E
- Country: Iran
- Province: Kerman
- County: Sirjan
- Bakhsh: Pariz
- Rural District: Saadatabad

Population (2006)
  - Total: 212
- Time zone: UTC+3:30 (IRST)
  - Summer (DST): UTC+4:30 (IRDT)

Hasanabad-e Yek (Persian: حسن اباد 1, also Romanized as Ḩasanābād-e Yek; also known as Ḩasanābād and Ḩasanābād-e Qomastān) is a village in Saadatabad Rural District, Pariz District, Sirjan County, Kerman Province, Iran. At the 2006 census, its population was 212, in 47 families.
