= Deh Now, Sirjan =

Neighborhood in Kerman province, Iran

Deh Now Persian: دهنو
- Neighborhood
- Location within Iran
- Coordinates: 29°39′50″N 55°48′32″E
- Country: Iran
- Province: Kerman
- County: Sirjan
- District: Pariz
- City: Hamashahr

Population (2006)
  - Total: 380
- Time zone: UTC+3:30 (IRST)

Deh Now (Persian: دهنو) (Note: Also romanized as Deh-e Now) is a neighborhood in the city of Hamashahr in Pariz District of Sirjan County, Kerman province, Iran.

== Demographics ==
=== Population ===
At the time of the 2006 National Census, Deh Now's population was 380 in 91 households, when it was a village in Saadatabad Rural District.

== History ==
In 2011, the village of Saadatabad was merged with the villages of Deh Now, Dowlatabad, Hoseynabad-e Do, and Yahyaabad to become the city of Hamashahr.
