= Ghofeyleh =

Ghofeyleh غفيله
- Village
- Location within Iran
- Coordinates: 31°25′51″N 48°29′37″E
- Country: Iran
- Province: Khuzestan
- County: Ahvaz
- Bakhsh: Hamidiyeh
- Rural District: Tarrah

Population (2006)
  - Total: 475
- Time zone: UTC+3:30 (IRST)
  - Summer (DST): UTC+4:30 (IRDT)

Ghofeyleh (Persian: غفيله) is a village in Tarrah Rural District, Hamidiyeh District, Ahvaz County, Khuzestan Province, Iran. At the 2006 census, its population was 475, in 83 families.
