= Ruchun-e Olya =

Ruchun-e Olya روچون عليا
- Village
- Location within Iran
- Coordinates: 29°51′46″N 55°51′47″E
- Country: Iran
- Province: Kerman
- County: Sirjan
- Bakhsh: Pariz
- Rural District: Pariz

Population (2006)
  - Total: 112
- Time zone: UTC+3:30 (IRST)
  - Summer (DST): UTC+4:30 (IRDT)

Ruchun-e Olya (Persian: روچون عليا, also Romanized as Rūchūn-e ‘Olyā; also known as Rūchūn-e Bālā) is a village in Pariz Rural District, Pariz District, Sirjan County, Kerman Province, Iran. At the 2006 census, its population was 112, in 25 families.
