= Abbas Yales =

Abbas Yales (Persian: عباس يالس) may refer to:

- Abbas Yales 1
- Abbas Yales 2
