= Chamim =

Chamim چميم
- Village
- Location within Iran
- Coordinates: 31°33′29″N 48°28′27″E
- Country: Iran
- Province: Khuzestan
- County: Ahvaz
- Bakhsh: Hamidiyeh
- Rural District: Karkheh

Population (2006)
  - Total: 121
- Time zone: UTC+3:30 (IRST)
  - Summer (DST): UTC+4:30 (IRDT)

Chamim (Persian: چميم, also Romanized as Chamīm) is a village in Karkheh Rural District, Hamidiyeh District, Ahvaz County, Khuzestan Province, Iran. At the 2006 census, its population was 121, in 27 families.
