= Shobeysheh =

Shobeysheh (Persian: شبيشه) may refer to:

- Shobeysheh, Ahvaz
- Shobeysheh, Shadegan
