= Takzeh =

Takzeh (Persian: تكزه) may refer to:

- Takzeh, Sirjan
- Takzeh, Pariz
