= Tutuiyeh =

Tutuiyeh توتوئيه
- Village
- Location within Iran
- Coordinates: 29°49′29″N 55°48′38″E
- Country: Iran
- Province: Kerman
- County: Sirjan
- Bakhsh: Pariz
- Rural District: Pariz

Population (2006)
  - Total: 23
- Time zone: UTC+3:30 (IRST)
  - Summer (DST): UTC+4:30 (IRDT)

Tutuiyeh (Persian: توتوئيه, also Romanized as Tūtū’īyeh; also known as Now Tū’īyeh) is a village in Pariz Rural District, Pariz District, Sirjan County, Kerman Province, Iran. At the 2006 census, its population was 23, in 12 families.
