= Dehliz-e Do =

Dehliz-e Do دهليز2
- Village
- Location within Iran
- Coordinates: 31°19′50″N 48°30′44″E
- Country: Iran
- Province: Khuzestan
- County: Ahvaz
- Bakhsh: Hamidiyeh
- Rural District: Jahad

Population (2006)
  - Total: 119
- Time zone: UTC+3:30 (IRST)
  - Summer (DST): UTC+4:30 (IRDT)

Dehliz-e Do (Persian: دهليز2, also Romanized as Dehlīz-e Do) is a village in Jahad Rural District, Hamidiyeh District, Ahvaz County, Khuzestan Province, Iran. At the 2006 census, its population was 119, in 18 families.
