= Deh-e Seraj =

Deh-e Seraj ده سراج
- Village
- Location within Iran
- Coordinates: 29°42′47″N 55°45′52″E
- Country: Iran
- Province: Kerman
- County: Sirjan
- Bakhsh: Pariz
- Rural District: Saadatabad

Population (2006)
  - Total: 330
- Time zone: UTC+3:30 (IRST)
  - Summer (DST): UTC+4:30 (IRDT)

Deh-e Seraj (Persian: ده سراج, also Romanized as Deh-e Serāj and Deh Serāj) is a village in Saadatabad Rural District, Pariz District, Sirjan County, Kerman Province, Iran. At the 2006 census, its population was 330, in 85 families.
