= Gowd-e Konark =

Gowd-e Konark گودكنارك
- Village
- Location within Iran
- Coordinates: 29°57′00″N 55°46′00″E
- Country: Iran
- Province: Kerman
- County: Sirjan
- Bakhsh: Pariz
- Rural District: Pariz

Population (2006)
  - Total: 12
- Time zone: UTC+3:30 (IRST)
  - Summer (DST): UTC+4:30 (IRDT)

Gowd-e Konark (Persian: گودكنارك, also Romanized as Gowd-e Konārak; also known as Gowd-e Gūnārk) is a village in Pariz Rural District, Pariz District, Sirjan County, Kerman Province, Iran. At the 2006 census, its population was 12, in 4 families.
