= Bid Khvab =

Bid Khvab بيدخواب
- Village
- Location within Iran
- Coordinates: 29°47′29″N 55°58′45″E
- Country: Iran
- Province: Kerman
- County: Sirjan
- Bakhsh: Pariz
- Rural District: Saadatabad

Population (2006)
  - Total: 34
- Time zone: UTC+3:30 (IRST)
  - Summer (DST): UTC+4:30 (IRDT)

Bid Khvab (Persian: بيدخواب, also Romanized as Bīd Khvāb, Bīd-e Khvāb, and Bīd-i-Khwāb; also known as Bīd Khab and Bīd Khvāh) is a village in Saadatabad Rural District, Pariz District, Sirjan County, Kerman Province, Iran. At the 2006 census, its population was 34, in 11 families.
