= Seyyed Hoseyn Musavi =

Seyyed Hoseyn Musavi سيدحسين موسوي
- Village
- Country: Iran
- Province: Khuzestan
- County: Ahvaz
- Bakhsh: Hamidiyeh
- Rural District: Jahad

Population (2006)
  - Total: 758
- Time zone: UTC+3:30 (IRST)
  - Summer (DST): UTC+4:30 (IRDT)

Seyyed Hoseyn Musavi (Persian: سيدحسين موسوي, also Romanized as Seyyed Ḩoseyn Mūsavī) is a village in Jahad Rural District, Hamidiyeh District, Ahvaz County, Khuzestan Province, Iran. At the 2006 census, its population was 758, in 126 families.
