= Deh-e Davai =

Deh-e Davai ده دعوايي
- Village
- Location within Iran
- Coordinates: 29°48′06″N 55°53′41″E
- Country: Iran
- Province: Kerman
- County: Sirjan
- Bakhsh: Pariz
- Rural District: Saadatabad

Population (2006)
  - Total: 56
- Time zone: UTC+3:30 (IRST)
  - Summer (DST): UTC+4:30 (IRDT)

Deh-e Davai (Persian: ده دعوايي, also Romanized as Deh-e Da‘vā’ī and Deh Da‘vā’ī; also known as Da‘vā’ī and Davā’ī) is a village in Saadatabad Rural District, Pariz District, Sirjan County, Kerman Province, Iran. At the 2006 census, its population was 56, in 11 families.
