= Dehliz-e Yek =

Dehliz-e Yek دهليزيك
- Village
- Location within Iran
- Coordinates: 31°21′59″N 48°27′32″E
- Country: Iran
- Province: Khuzestan
- County: Ahvaz
- Bakhsh: Hamidiyeh
- Rural District: Jahad

Population (2006)
  - Total: 138
- Time zone: UTC+3:30 (IRST)
  - Summer (DST): UTC+4:30 (IRDT)

Dehliz-e Yek (Persian: دهليزيك, also Romanized as Dehlīz-e Yek) is a village in Jahad Rural District, Hamidiyeh District, Ahvaz County, Khuzestan Province, Iran. At the 2006 census, its population was 138, in 23 families.
