= Chenal =

Chenal is French for "channel". It can refer to:

== People ==
- Giuliana Chenal-Minuzzo (1931–2020), Italian alpine skier
- Joël Chenal (born 1973), French alpine skier
- Leo Chenal (born 2000), American football player
- Marthe Chenal (1881–1947), French operatic soprano
- Pierre Chenal (1904–1990), French director and screenwriter

== Places ==
- Chenal, Louisiana, community in the United States
- Chenal Valley, Little Rock, Arkansas, United States
- Chenal Bari, village in Pariz District, Sirjan County, Kerman Province, Iran

== See also ==
- Chenaux (disambiguation)
- Cheval (disambiguation)
