= Kuheh-ye Do =

Kuheh-ye Do كوهه دو
- Village
- Location within Iran
- Coordinates: 31°18′22″N 48°23′41″E
- Country: Iran
- Province: Khuzestan
- County: Ahvaz
- Bakhsh: Hamidiyeh
- Rural District: Jahad

Population (2006)
  - Total: 46
- Time zone: UTC+3:30 (IRST)
  - Summer (DST): UTC+4:30 (IRDT)

Kuheh-ye Do (Persian: كوهه دو, also Romanized as Kūheh-ye Do) is a village in Jahad Rural District, Hamidiyeh District, Ahvaz County, Khuzestan Province, Iran. At the 2006 census, its population was 46, in 8 families.
