= Korran =

Village in Kerman province, Iran

Korran Persian: كران
- Village
- Location within Iran
- Coordinates: 29°43′20″N 55°43′40″E
- Country: Iran
- Province: Kerman
- County: Sirjan
- District: Pariz
- Rural District: Saadatabad

Population (2016)
  - Total: 533
- Time zone: UTC+3:30 (IRST)

Korran (Persian: كران) (Note: Also romanized as Korrān; also known as Khorram, Khorrān, Khurram, and Kooran) is a village in Saadatabad Rural District of Pariz District, Sirjan County, Kerman province, Iran.

== Demographics ==
=== Population ===
At the time of the 2006 National Census, the village's population was 369 in 103 households. The following census in 2011 counted 283 people in 92 households. The 2016 census measured the population of the village as 533 people in 183 households. It was the most populous village in its rural district.
