= Tarrah-e Do =

Tarrah-e Do طراح دو
- Village
- Location within Iran
- Coordinates: 31°23′58″N 48°24′00″E
- Country: Iran
- Province: Khuzestan
- County: Ahvaz
- Bakhsh: Hamidiyeh
- Rural District: Tarrah

Population (2006)
  - Total: 233
- Time zone: UTC+3:30 (IRST)
  - Summer (DST): UTC+4:30 (IRDT)

Tarrah-e Do (Persian: طراح دو, also Romanized as Ţarrāḩ-e Do; also known as Mollā Jāber and Ţarrāḩ-e Mollā ‘Abūdī-ye Yek) is a village in Tarrah Rural District, Hamidiyeh District, Ahvaz County, Khuzestan Province, Iran. At the 2006 census, its population was 233, in 38 families.
