= Abbas Yales-e Yek =

Abbas Yales-e Yek عباس يالس يك
- Village
- Location within Iran
- Coordinates: 31°20′55″N 48°25′47″E
- Country: Iran
- Province: Khuzestan
- County: Ahvaz
- Bakhsh: Hamidiyeh
- Rural District: Tarrah

Population (2006)
  - Total: 127
- Time zone: UTC+3:30 (IRST)
  - Summer (DST): UTC+4:30 (IRDT)

Abbas Yales-e Yek (Persian: عباس يالس يك, also Romanized as ‘Abbās Yāles-e Yek; also known as ‘Abbās-e Yālīs and ‘Abbāsī) is a village in Tarrah Rural District, Hamidiyeh District, Ahvaz County, Khuzestan Province, Iran. At the 2006 census, its population was 127, in 21 families.
