= Now Qand, Kerman =

Now Qand نوقند
- Village
- Location within Iran
- Coordinates: 29°50′59″N 55°42′54″E
- Country: Iran
- Province: Kerman
- County: Sirjan
- Bakhsh: Pariz
- Rural District: Pariz

Population (2006)
  - Total: 79
- Time zone: UTC+3:30 (IRST)
  - Summer (DST): UTC+4:30 (IRDT)

Now Qand (Persian: نوقند, also known as Now Ghand) is a village in Pariz Rural District, Pariz District, Sirjan County, Kerman Province, Iran. At the 2006 census, its population was 79, in 19 families.
