= Gambueh-ye Bozorg =

Village in Khuzestan province, Iran

Gambueh-ye Bozorg Persian: گمبوعه بزرگ
- Village
- Location within Iran
- Coordinates: 31°23′20″N 48°31′34″E
- Country: Iran
- Province: Khuzestan
- County: Hamidiyeh
- District: Gambueh
- Rural District: Jahad

Population (2016)
  - Total: 2,692
- Time zone: UTC+3:30 (IRST)

Gambueh-ye Bozorg (Persian: گمبوعه بزرگ) (Note: Also romanized as Gombooehé Bozorg and Gambū‘eh-ye Bozorg; also known as Gambū‘eh, Gonbū‘eh-ye Bozorg, and Qombū‘eh-ye Bozorg) is a village in Jahad Rural District of Gambueh District, Hamidiyeh County, Khuzestan province, Iran, serving as capital of both the district and the rural district.

== Demographics ==
=== Population ===
At the time of the 2006 National Census, the village's population was 1,846 in 312 households, when it was in the former Hamidiyeh District of Ahvaz County. The following census in 2011 counted 1,998 people in 486 households. The 2016 census measured the population of the village as 2,692 people in 702 households, by which time the district had been separated from the county in the establishment of Hamidiyeh County. The rural district was transferred to the new Gambueh District. It was the most populous village in its rural district.
