= Gostuiyeh =

Village in Kerman province, Iran

Gostuiyeh Persian: گستوييه
- Village
- Location within Iran
- Coordinates: 29°51′31″N 55°41′45″E
- Country: Iran
- Province: Kerman
- County: Sirjan
- District: Pariz
- Rural District: Pariz

Population (2016)
  - Total: 1,593
- Time zone: UTC+3:30 (IRST)

Gostuiyeh (Persian: گستوييه) (Note: Also romanized as Gostū’īyeh; also known as Gashtū’īyeh) is a village in Pariz Rural District of Pariz District, Sirjan County, Kerman province, Iran.

== Demographics ==
=== Population ===
At the time of the 2006 National Census, the village's population was 643 in 158 households. The following census in 2011 counted 805 people in 221 households. The 2016 census measured the population of the village as 1,593 people in 531 households. It was the most populous village in its rural district.
