= Khasraj-e Beyt-e Qashem =

Khasraj-e Beyt-e Qashem خسرج بيت قشم
- Village
- Country: Iran
- Province: Khuzestan
- County: Ahvaz
- Bakhsh: Hamidiyeh
- Rural District: Karkheh

Population (2006)
  - Total: 26
- Time zone: UTC+3:30 (IRST)
  - Summer (DST): UTC+4:30 (IRDT)

Khasraj-e Beyt-e Qashem (Persian: خسرج بيت قشم) is a village in Karkheh Rural District, Hamidiyeh District, Ahvaz County, Khuzestan Province, Iran. At the 2006 census, its population was 26, in 5 families.
