= Shati =

Shati may refer to:

- Sati (castle), a castle near the Adriatic
- Shati, Iran, a village in Khuzestan Province, Iran
- Al-Shati Camp, a refugee camp in Gaza
