= Ghazban =

Ghazban غضبان
- Village
- Location within Iran
- Coordinates: 31°26′43″N 48°26′02″E
- Country: Iran
- Province: Khuzestan
- County: Ahvaz
- Bakhsh: Hamidiyeh
- Rural District: Jahad

Population (2006)
  - Total: 218
- Time zone: UTC+3:30 (IRST)
  - Summer (DST): UTC+4:30 (IRDT)

Ghazban (Persian: غضبان, also Romanized as Ghaẕbān and Ghazbān; also known as ‘Ashīreh-ye Qazbān) is a village in Jahad Rural District, Hamidiyeh District, Ahvaz County, Khuzestan Province, Iran. At the 2006 census, its population was 218, in 40 families.
