= Abbas Yales-e Do =

Abbas Yales-e Do عباس يالس دو
- Village
- Location within Iran
- Coordinates: 31°20′31″N 48°25′16″E
- Country: Iran
- Province: Khuzestan
- County: Ahvaz
- Bakhsh: Hamidiyeh
- Rural District: Tarrah

Population (2006)
  - Total: 306
- Time zone: UTC+3:30 (IRST)
  - Summer (DST): UTC+4:30 (IRDT)

Abbas Yales-e Do (Persian: عباس يالس دو, also Romanized as ‘Abbās Yāles-e Do) is a village in Tarrah Rural District, Hamidiyeh District, Ahvaz County, Khuzestan Province, Iran. At the 2006 census, its population was 306, in 54 families.
