= Kuheh-ye Yek =

Kuheh-ye Yek كوهه يك
- Village
- Location within Iran
- Coordinates: 31°18′54″N 48°23′32″E
- Country: Iran
- Province: Khuzestan
- County: Ahvaz
- Bakhsh: Hamidiyeh
- Rural District: Jahad

Population (2006)
  - Total: 166
- Time zone: UTC+3:30 (IRST)
  - Summer (DST): UTC+4:30 (IRDT)

Kuheh-ye Yek (Persian: كوهه يك, also Romanized as Kūheh-ye Yek; also known as Kūheh and Kūh Ha) is a village in Jahad Rural District, Hamidiyeh District, Ahvaz County, Khuzestan Province, Iran. At the 2006 census, its population was 166, in 26 families.
