= Khasraj-e Khalaf =

Khasraj-e Khalaf خسرج خلف
- Village
- Location within Iran
- Coordinates: 31°38′06″N 48°34′19″E
- Country: Iran
- Province: Khuzestan
- County: Ahvaz
- Bakhsh: Hamidiyeh
- Rural District: Karkheh

Population (2006)
  - Total: 333
- Time zone: UTC+3:30 (IRST)
  - Summer (DST): UTC+4:30 (IRDT)

Khasraj-e Khalaf (Persian: خسرج خلف; also known as Khasraj) is a village in Karkheh Rural District, Hamidiyeh District, Ahvaz County, Khuzestan Province, Iran. At the 2006 census, its population was 333, in 46 families.
