= Showq-e Olya =

Showq-e Olya شوق عليا
- Village
- Location within Iran
- Coordinates: 29°50′49″N 55°42′41″E
- Country: Iran
- Province: Kerman
- County: Sirjan
- Bakhsh: Pariz
- Rural District: Pariz

Population (2006)
  - Total: 45
- Time zone: UTC+3:30 (IRST)
  - Summer (DST): UTC+4:30 (IRDT)

Showq-e Olya (Persian: شوق عليا, also Romanized as Showq-e ‘Olyā; also known as Shogh Olya, Showq-e Bālā) is a village in Pariz Rural District, Pariz District, Sirjan County, Kerman Province, Iran. At the 2006 census, its population was 45, in 10 families.
