= Shartaq-e Yek =

Shartaq-e Yek شرطاق يك
- Village
- Location within Iran
- Coordinates: 31°19′30″N 48°26′04″E
- Country: Iran
- Province: Khuzestan
- County: Ahvaz
- Bakhsh: Hamidiyeh
- Rural District: Jahad

Population (2006)
  - Total: 173
- Time zone: UTC+3:30 (IRST)
  - Summer (DST): UTC+4:30 (IRDT)

Shartaq-e Yek (Persian: شرطاق يك, also Romanized as Shartāq-e Yek) is a village in Jahad Rural District, Hamidiyeh District, Ahvaz County, Khuzestan Province, Iran. At the 2006 census, its population was 173, in 32 families.
