= Ramseh-ye Yek =

Ramseh-ye Yek رامسه يك
- Village
- Location within Iran
- Coordinates: 31°22′24″N 48°27′22″E
- Country: Iran
- Province: Khuzestan
- County: Ahvaz
- Bakhsh: Hamidiyeh
- Rural District: Tarrah

Population (2006)
  - Total: 139
- Time zone: UTC+3:30 (IRST)
  - Summer (DST): UTC+4:30 (IRDT)

Ramseh-ye Yek (Persian: رامسه يك) is a village in Tarrah Rural District, Hamidiyeh District, Ahvaz County, Khuzestan Province, Iran. At the 2006 census, its population was 139, in 23 families.
