= Chenarbarin =

Chenarbarin چناربرين
- Village
- Location within Iran
- Coordinates: 29°47′27″N 55°53′36″E
- Country: Iran
- Province: Kerman
- County: Sirjan
- Bakhsh: Pariz
- Rural District: Saadatabad

Population (2006)
  - Total: 52
- Time zone: UTC+3:30 (IRST)
  - Summer (DST): UTC+4:30 (IRDT)

Chenarbarin (Persian: چناربرين, also Romanized as Chenārbarīn; also known as Chenal Bari and Chenal Parin) is a village in Saadatabad Rural District, Pariz District, Sirjan County, Kerman Province, Iran. At the 2006 census, its population was 52, in 13 families.
