= Kohuiyeh =

Kohuiyeh كهوييه
- Village
- Location within Iran
- Coordinates: 29°47′58″N 55°44′24″E
- Country: Iran
- Province: Kerman
- County: Sirjan
- Bakhsh: Pariz
- Rural District: Pariz

Population (2006)
  - Total: 225
- Time zone: UTC+3:30 (IRST)
  - Summer (DST): UTC+4:30 (IRDT)

Kohuiyeh (Persian: كهوييه, also Romanized as Kohū’īyeh; also known as Kūheh) is a village in Pariz Rural District, Pariz District, Sirjan County, Kerman Province, Iran. At the 2006 census, its population was 225, in 48 families.
