= Showq-e Sofla =

Showq-e Sofla شوق سفلي
- Village
- Location within Iran
- Coordinates: 29°50′21″N 55°42′46″E
- Country: Iran
- Province: Kerman
- County: Sirjan
- Bakhsh: Pariz
- Rural District: Pariz

Population (2006)
  - Total: 63
- Time zone: UTC+3:30 (IRST)
  - Summer (DST): UTC+4:30 (IRDT)

Showq-e Sofla (Persian: شوق سفلي, also Romanized as Showq-e Soflá; also known as Shogh Sofla, Showq, and Showq-e Pā’īn) is a village in Pariz Rural District, Pariz District, Sirjan County, Kerman Province, Iran. At the 2006 census, its population was 63, in 16 families.
