= Seyyed Sharif =

Seyyed Sharif (Persian: سيدشريف) may refer to:

- Seyyed Sharif, Ahvaz
- Seyyed Sharif (31°18′ N 48°25′ E), Ahvaz
- Seyyed Sharif, Bavi
