= Shati, Iran =

Shati شاطي
- Village
- Location within Iran
- Coordinates: 31°36′51″N 48°33′51″E
- Country: Iran
- Province: Khuzestan
- County: Ahvaz
- Bakhsh: Hamidiyeh
- Rural District: Karkheh

Population (2006)
  - Total: 63
- Time zone: UTC+3:30 (IRST)
  - Summer (DST): UTC+4:30 (IRDT)

Shati (Persian: شاطي, also Romanized as Shāţī) is a village in Karkheh Rural District, Hamidiyeh District, Ahvaz County, Khuzestan Province, Iran. At the 2006 census, its population was 63, in 11 families.
