= Shartaq-e Do =

Shartaq-e Do شرطاق دو
- Village
- Location within Iran
- Coordinates: 31°19′18″N 48°25′43″E
- Country: Iran
- Province: Khuzestan
- County: Ahvaz
- Bakhsh: Hamidiyeh
- Rural District: Jahad

Population (2006)
  - Total: 250
- Time zone: UTC+3:30 (IRST)
  - Summer (DST): UTC+4:30 (IRDT)

Shartaq-e Do (Persian: شرطاق دو, also Romanized as Shartāq Do and Shartāq-e Do; also known as Sharţāq) is a village in Jahad Rural District, Hamidiyeh District, Ahvaz County, Khuzestan Province, Iran. At the 2006 census, its population was 250, in 42 families.
