= Shobeysheh, Ahvaz =

Shobeysheh شبيشه
- Village
- Location within Iran
- Coordinates: 31°28′17″N 48°25′09″E
- Country: Iran
- Province: Khuzestan
- County: Ahvaz
- Bakhsh: Hamidiyeh
- Rural District: Tarrah

Population (2006)
  - Total: 2,672
- Time zone: UTC+3:30 (IRST)
  - Summer (DST): UTC+4:30 (IRDT)

Shobeysheh (Persian: شبيشه; also known as Ţarīq ol Qods) is a village in Tarrah Rural District, Hamidiyeh District, Ahvaz County, Khuzestan Province, Iran. At the 2006 census, its population was 2,672, in 412 families.
