= Seyyed Sharif, Ahvaz =

Seyyed Sharif سيدشريف
- Village
- Country: Iran
- Province: Khuzestan
- County: Ahvaz
- Bakhsh: Hamidiyeh
- Rural District: Jahad

Population (2006)
  - Total: 70
- Time zone: UTC+3:30 (IRST)
  - Summer (DST): UTC+4:30 (IRDT)

Seyyed Sharif (Persian: سيدشريف, also Romanized as Seyyed Sharīf) is a village in Jahad Rural District, Hamidiyeh District, Ahvaz County, Khuzestan Province, Iran. As of the 2006 census, its population was 70 in 14 families.
