= Sayyed Yaber =

Sayyed Yaber سيديابر
- Village
- Location within Iran
- Coordinates: 31°27′00″N 48°27′00″E
- Country: Iran
- Province: Khuzestan
- County: Ahvaz
- Bakhsh: Hamidiyeh
- Rural District: Tarrah

Population (2006)
  - Total: 417
- Time zone: UTC+3:30 (IRST)
  - Summer (DST): UTC+4:30 (IRDT)

Sayyed Yaber (Persian: سيديابر, also Romanized as Seyyed Yāber; also known as ‘Ashīreh-ye Seyyed Jāber) is a village in Tarrah Rural District, Hamidiyeh District, Ahvaz County, Khuzestan Province, Iran. At the 2006 census, its population was 417, in 49 families.
