= Gambueh-ye Kuchek =

Gambueh-ye Kuchek گمبوعه كوچك
- Village
- Location within Iran
- Coordinates: 31°23′13″N 48°32′07″E
- Country: Iran
- Province: Khuzestan
- County: Ahvaz
- Bakhsh: Hamidiyeh
- Rural District: Jahad

Population (2006)
  - Total: 359
- Time zone: UTC+3:30 (IRST)
  - Summer (DST): UTC+4:30 (IRDT)

Gambueh-ye Kuchek (Persian: گمبوعه كوچك, also Romanized as Gambū‘eh-ye Kūchek, Gombooehé Koochak, and Gombū‘eh-ye Kūchek; also known as Qombu‘eh-ye Kūchak) is a village in Jahad Rural District, Hamidiyeh District, Ahvaz County, Khuzestan Province, Iran. At the 2006 census, its population was 359, in 57 families.
