= Sayyed Majid =

Sayyed Majid سيدمجيد
- Village
- Location within Iran
- Coordinates: 31°26′57″N 48°25′36″E
- Country: Iran
- Province: Khuzestan
- County: Ahvaz
- Bakhsh: Hamidiyeh
- Rural District: Tarrah

Population (2006)
  - Total: 20
- Time zone: UTC+3:30 (IRST)
  - Summer (DST): UTC+4:30 (IRDT)

Sayyed Majid (Persian: سيدمجيد, also Romanized as Seyyed Majīd; also known as ‘Ashīreh-ye Seyyed Majīd) is a village in Tarrah Rural District, Hamidiyeh District, Ahvaz County, Khuzestan Province, Iran. At the 2006 census, its population was 20, in 4 families.
