= Takzeh, Pariz =

Takzeh تكزه
- Village
- Location within Iran
- Coordinates: 29°51′34″N 55°49′24″E
- Country: Iran
- Province: Kerman
- County: Sirjan
- Bakhsh: Pariz
- Rural District: Pariz

Population (2006)
  - Total: 31
- Time zone: UTC+3:30 (IRST)
  - Summer (DST): UTC+4:30 (IRDT)

Takzeh (Persian: تكزه; also known as Takzeh Abreqūn) is a village in Pariz Rural District, Pariz District, Sirjan County, Kerman Province, Iran. At the 2006 census, its population was 31, in 7 families.
