= Mohammad Ebrahim Bastani Parizi =

Iranian historian (1924–2014)

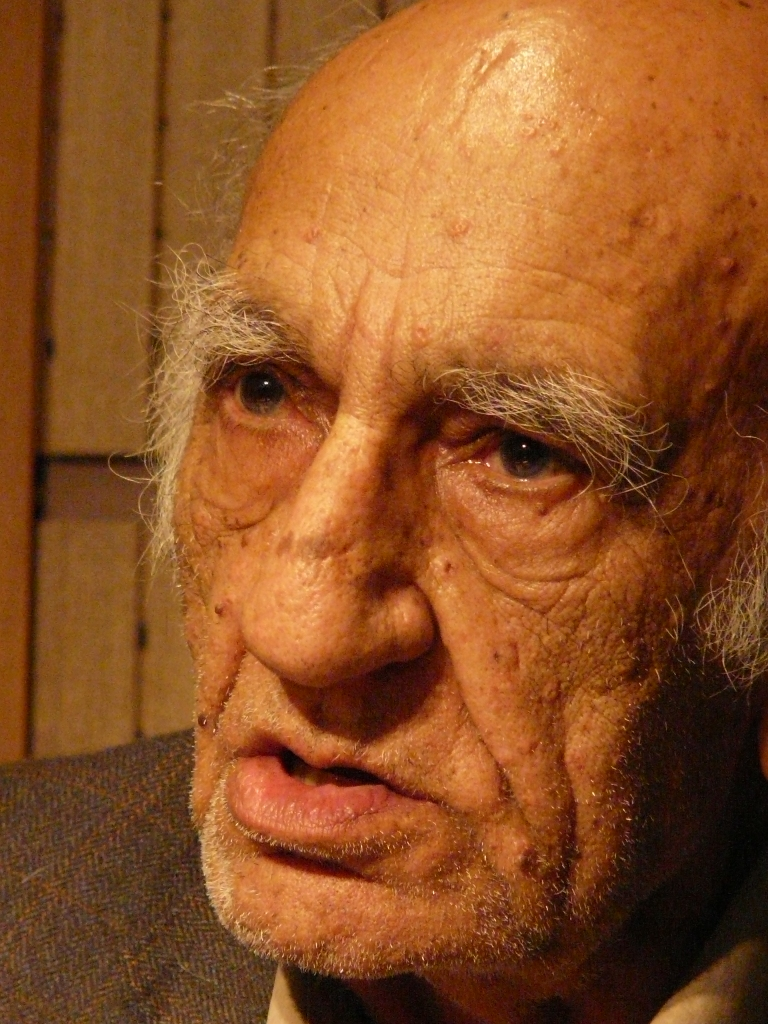
- Born: 24 December 1925; Pariz, Sirjan, Iran
- Died: 25 March 2014 (aged 89); Tehran, Iran
- Spouse: Narges Naeini (m. 1950)
- Children: 2
- Awards: Order of Knowledge (1st class)

Education
- Education: University of Tehran

Philosophical work
- Era: 20th / 21st-century philosophy
- School: Historian, writer and author

Mohammad Ebrahim Bastani Parizi (Persian: محمد ابراهیم باستانی پاریزی, 12 December 1924 – 25 March 2014; born in Pariz) was an Iranian historian, translator, poet, essayist and author of non-fiction books. His numerous publications (over 50 books) are mostly popular reads on topics such as the history of Iran and the history of his hometown Pariz in Kerman province.
