= Dehkadeh Rural District =

Rural district in Khuzestan province, Iran

Dehkadeh Rural District Persian: دهستان دهکده
- Rural District
- Location within Iran
- Coordinates: 31°28′52″N 48°28′20″E
- Country: Iran
- Province: Khuzestan
- County: Hamidiyeh
- District: Central
- Capital: Dehkadeh

Population (2016)
  - Total: 8,496
- Time zone: UTC+3:30 (IRST)

Dehkadeh Rural District (Persian: دهستان دهکده) is in the Central District of Hamidiyeh County, Khuzestan province, Iran. Its capital is the village of Dehkadeh.

== History ==
After the 2011 National Census, Hamidiyeh District was separated from Ahvaz County in the establishment of Hamidiyeh County, and Dehkadeh Rural District was created in the new Central District.

== Demographics ==
=== Population ===
At the time of the 2016 census, the rural district's population was 8,496 in 2,113 households. The most populous of its 18 villages was Dehkadeh, with 2,951 people.
