= Chenaux =

Chenaux can refer to:

== People ==
- Bernhard Chenaux (born 1939), Swiss footballer
- Eliot Chenaux (born 1947), American academic and competitive swimmer
- Robert Chenaux (born 1943), Puerto Rican Olympic swimmer

== Places ==
- Chenaux, community in Township of Whitewater Region, Ontario, Canada
- Les Chenaux Regional County Municipality, Quebec, Canada
- Rivière des Chenaux, river in Quebec, Canada
- Chenaux Castle, Estavayer-le-Lac, Fribourg, Switzerland

== See also ==
- Chenal (disambiguation)
