= Gambueh District =

District in Khuzestan province, Iran

Gambueh District Persian: بخش گمبوعه
- District
- Location within Iran
- Coordinates: 31°22′12″N 48°26′43″E
- Country: Iran
- Province: Khuzestan
- County: Hamidiyeh
- Capital: Gambueh-ye Bozorg

Population (2016)
  - Total: 13,865
- Time zone: UTC+3:30 (IRST)

Gambueh District (Persian: بخش گمبوعه) is in Hamidiyeh County, Khuzestan province, Iran. Its capital is the village of Gambueh-ye Bozorg.

== History ==
After the 2011 National Census, Hamidiyeh District was separated from Ahvaz County in the establishment of Hamidiyeh County, which was divided into two districts of two rural districts each, with Hamidiyeh as its capital and only city.

== Demographics ==
=== Population ===
At the time of the 2016 census, the district's population was 13,865 inhabitants in 3,446 households.

=== Administrative divisions ===
Gambueh District Population
Administrative Divisions	2016
Jahad RD	8,598
Tarrah RD	5,267
Total	13,865
RD = Rural District
