= Hamashahr, Kerman =

City in Kerman province, Iran

Hamashahr Persian: هماشهر
- City
- Location within Iran
- Coordinates: 29°39′00″N 55°49′05″E
- Country: Iran
- Province: Kerman
- County: Sirjan
- District: Pariz

Population (2016)
  - Total: 3,311
- Time zone: UTC+3:30 (IRST)

Hamashahr (Persian: هماشهر) (Note: Formerly Saadatabad (سعادت اباد), also romanized as Sa‘ādatābād) is a city in Pariz District of Sirjan County, Kerman province, Iran, and serves as the administrative center for Saadatabad Rural District.

== History ==
In 2011, the village of Saadatabad was merged with the villages of Deh Now, Dowlatabad, Hoseynabad-e Do, and Yahyaabad to become the city of Hamashahr.

== Demographics ==
=== Population ===
At the time of the 2006 National Census, Saadatabad's population was 1,942 in 389 households. The following census in 2011 counted 2,800 people in 790 households, by which time the village had merged with other villages to become the city of Hamashahr. The 2016 census measured the population of the city as 3,311 people in 1,038 households.
