= Khasraj-e Razi Mohammad =

Khasraj-e Razi Mohammad خسرج راضي محمد
- Village
- Country: Iran
- Province: Khuzestan
- County: Shush
- Bakhsh: Shavur
- Rural District: Seyyed Abbas

Population (2006)
  - Total: 761
- Time zone: UTC+3:30 (IRST)
  - Summer (DST): UTC+4:30 (IRDT)

Khasraj-e Razi Mohammad (Persian: خسرج راضي محمد, also Romanized as Khasraj-e Rāz̤ī Moḩammad) is a village in Seyyed Abbas Rural District, Shavur District, Shush County, Khuzestan Province, Iran. At the 2006 census, its population was 761, in 134 families.
