= Hamidiyeh =

City in Khuzestan province, Iran

Hamidiyeh Persian: حمیدیه
- City
- Location within Iran
- Coordinates: 31°28′52″N 48°26′06″E
- Country: Iran
- Province: Khuzestan
- County: Hamidiyeh
- District: Central

Population (2016)
  - Total: 22,057
- Time zone: UTC+3:30 (IRST)

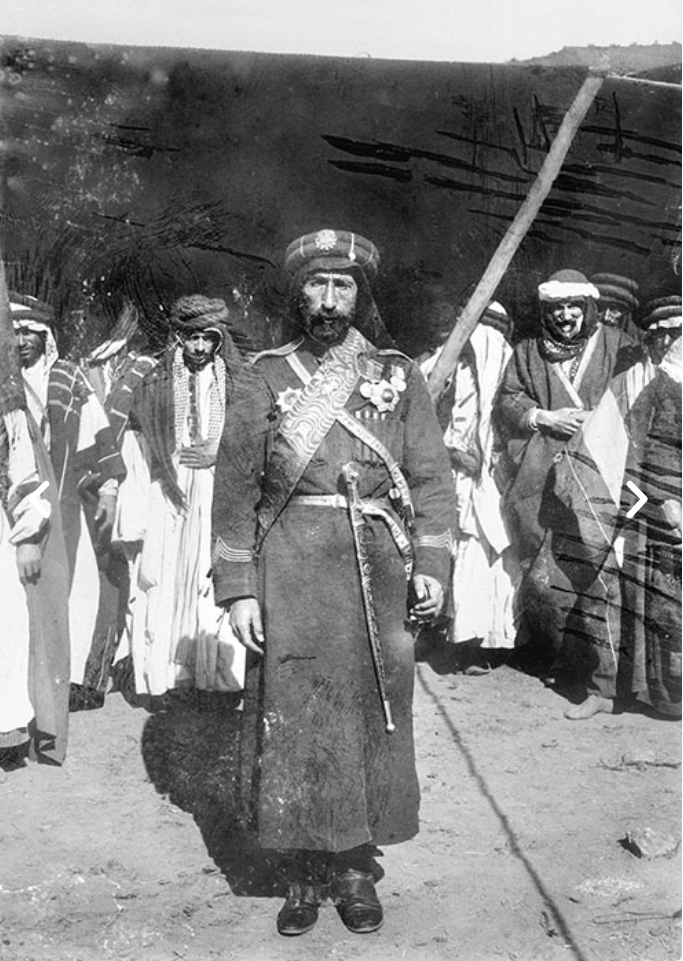
Ibrahim Pasha Milli was the chief of the Kurdish Milan tribal federation in Upper Mesopotamia, the Aleppo Vilayet, and the Syrian Vilayet of the Ottoman Empire and the commander of several paramilitary Hamidiye regiments

Hamidiyeh (Persian: حمیدیه) (Note: Also romanized as Ḩamīdīyeh; also known as Allāh, Illah, and Hamidiya) is a city in the Central District of Hamidiyeh County, Khuzestan province, Iran, serving as capital of both the county and the district.

== Demographics ==
=== Population ===
At the time of the 2006 National Census, the city's population was 21,977 in 3,949 households, when it was capital of the former Hamidiyeh District of Ahwaz County. The following census in 2011 counted 20,982 people in 4,731 households. The 2016 census measured the population of the city as 22,057 people in 5,419 households, by which time the district had been separated from the county in the establishment of Hamidiyeh County. Hamidiyeh was transferred to the new Central District as the county's capital.
