= Ashireh-ye Khalaf =

Ashireh-ye Khalaf عشيره خلف
- Village
- Location within Iran
- Coordinates: 31°28′19″N 48°24′06″E
- Country: Iran
- Province: Khuzestan
- County: Shush
- Bakhsh: Shavur
- Rural District: Seyyed Abbas

Population (2006)
  - Total: 270
- Time zone: UTC+3:30 (IRST)
  - Summer (DST): UTC+4:30 (IRDT)

Ashireh-ye Khalaf (Persian: عشيره خلف, also Romanized as ʿAshīreh-ye Khalāf; also known as ‘Ashīreh-ye Ḩalāf and Ḩallāf) is a village in Seyyed Abbas Rural District, Shavur District, Shush County, Khuzestan Province, Iran. At the 2006 census, its population was 270, in 40 families.
