= Now Qand, South Khorasan =

Now Qand نوقند
- Village
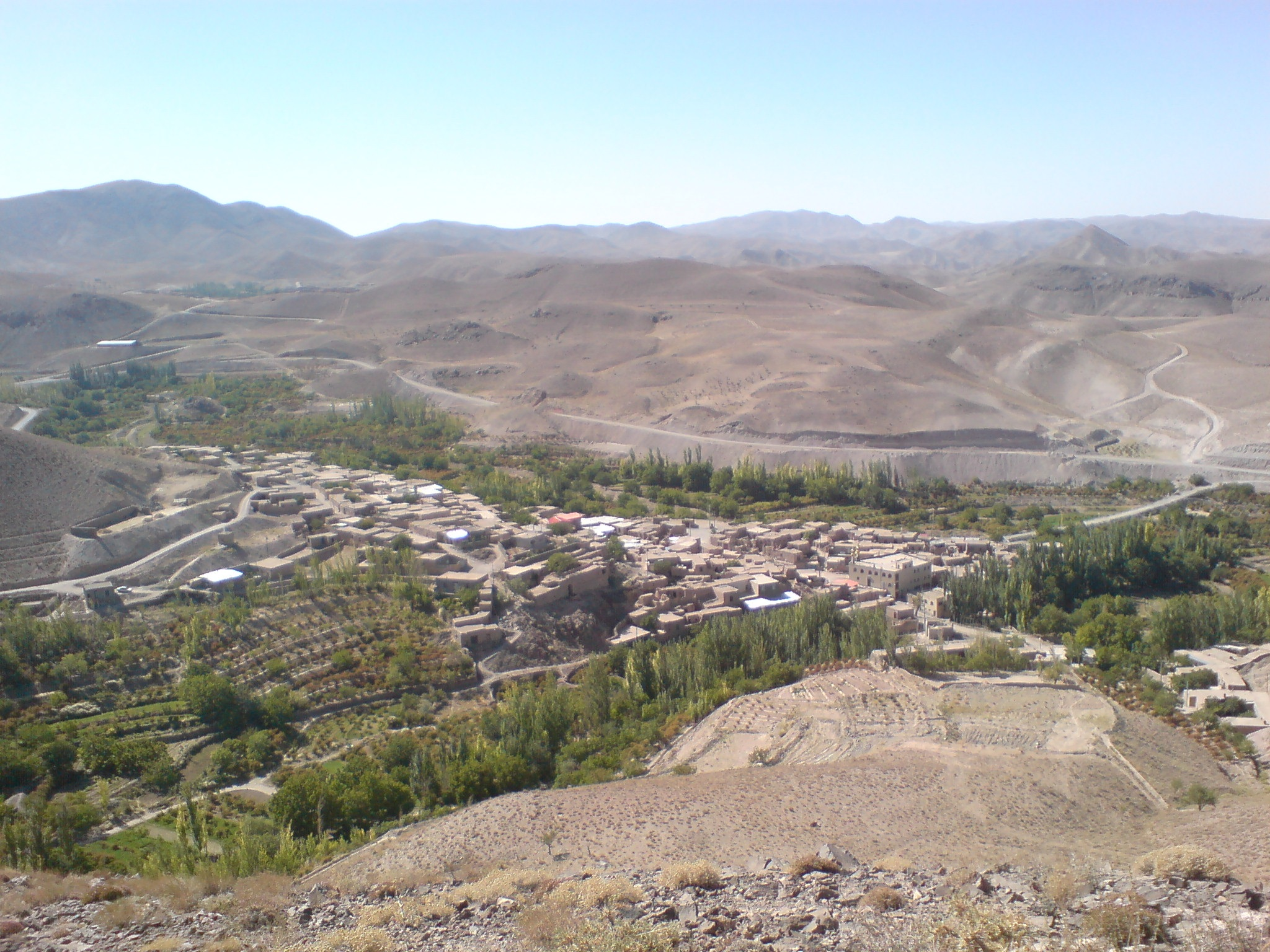
- Now Qand village

- Location within Iran
- Coordinates: 33°15′44″N 59°42′00″E
- Country: Iran
- Province: South Khorasan
- County: Darmian
- Bakhsh: Qohestan
- Rural District: Qohestan

Population (2006)
  - Total: 150
- Time zone: UTC+3:30 (IRST)
  - Summer (DST): UTC+4:30 (IRDT)

Now Qand (Persian: نوقند, also Romanized as Naughand) is a village in Qohestan Rural District, Qohestan District, Darmian County, South Khorasan Province, Iran. At the 2006 census, its population was 150, in 56 families.
