= Khasraj-e Mezban =

Khasraj-e Mezban خسرج مزبان
- Village
- Location within Iran
- Coordinates: 31°44′55″N 48°27′17″E
- Country: Iran
- Province: Khuzestan
- County: Shush
- Bakhsh: Shavur
- Rural District: Seyyed Abbas

Population (2006)
  - Total: 405
- Time zone: UTC+3:30 (IRST)
  - Summer (DST): UTC+4:30 (IRDT)

Khasraj-e Mezban (Persian: خسرج مزبان, also Romanized as Khasraj-e Mezbān and Khasraj-e-Mazbān; also known as Khasraj and Khasraj-e-Nazbān) is a village in Seyyed Abbas Rural District, Shavur District, Shush County, Khuzestan Province, Iran. At the 2006 census, its population was 405, in 64 families.
