= Shobeysheh, Shadegan =

Shobeysheh شبيشه
- Village
- Location within Iran
- Coordinates: 30°41′23″N 48°43′06″E
- Country: Iran
- Province: Khuzestan
- County: Shadegan
- Bakhsh: Central
- Rural District: Buzi

Population (2006)
  - Total: 95
- Time zone: UTC+3:30 (IRST)
  - Summer (DST): UTC+4:30 (IRDT)

Shobeysheh (Persian: شبيشه) is a village in Buzi Rural District, in the Central District of Shadegan County, Khuzestan Province, Iran. At the 2006 census, its population was 95, in 16 families.
