= Takzeh, Sirjan =

Takzeh تكزه
- Village
- Country: Iran
- Province: Kerman
- County: Sirjan
- Bakhsh: Central
- Rural District: Chahar Gonbad

Population (2006)
  - Total: 15
- Time zone: UTC+3:30 (IRST)
  - Summer (DST): UTC+4:30 (IRDT)

Takzeh (Persian: تكزه) is a village in Chahar Gonbad Rural District, in the Central District of Sirjan County, Kerman Province, Iran. At the 2006 census, its population was 15, in 4 families.
