= Central District (Hamidiyeh County) =

District in Khuzestan province, Iran

Central District (Hamidiyeh County) Persian: بخش مرکزی شهرستان حمیدیه
- District
- Location within Iran
- Coordinates: 31°34′03″N 48°25′42″E
- Country: Iran
- Province: Khuzestan
- County: Hamidiyeh
- Capital: Hamidiyeh

Population (2016)
  - Total: 39,897
- Time zone: UTC+3:30 (IRST)

The Central District of Hamidiyeh County (Persian: بخش مرکزی شهرستان حمیدیه) is in Khuzestan province, Iran. Its capital is the city of Hamidiyeh.

== History ==
After the 2011 National Census, Hamidiyeh District was separated from Ahvaz County in the establishment of Hamidiyeh County, which was divided into two districts of two rural districts each, with Hamidiyeh as its capital and only city.

== Demographics ==
=== Population ===
At the time of the 2016 census, the district's population was 39,897 inhabitants in 10,152 households.

=== Administrative divisions ===
Central District (Hamidiyeh County) Population
Administrative Divisions	2016
Dehkadeh RD	8,496
Karkheh RD	9,344
Hamidiyeh (city)	22,057
Total	39,897
RD = Rural District
