= Pariz =

City in Kerman province, Iran

Pariz Persian: پاریز
- City
- Location within Iran
- Coordinates: 29°52′15″N 55°45′00″E
- Country: Iran
- Province: Kerman
- County: Sirjan
- District: Pariz

Population (2016)
  - Total: 8,005
- Time zone: UTC+3:30 (IRST)

Pariz (Persian: پاریز) (Note: Also romanized as Pārīz; also known as Bariz and Rīz) is a city in, and the capital of, Pariz District of Sirjan County, Kerman province, Iran. It also serves as the administrative center for Pariz Rural District.

== Demographics ==
=== Population ===
At the time of the 2006 National Census, the city's population was 4,527 in 1,231 households. The following census in 2011 counted 4,902 people in 1,417 households. The 2016 census measured the population of the city as 8,005 people in 2,596 households.
