= Dehkadeh, Kerman =

Dehkadeh دهكده
- Village
- Location within Iran
- Coordinates: 29°57′49″N 56°25′29″E
- Country: Iran
- Province: Kerman
- County: Bardsir
- Bakhsh: Central
- Rural District: Kuh Panj

Population (2006)
  - Total: 61
- Time zone: UTC+3:30 (IRST)
  - Summer (DST): UTC+4:30 (IRDT)

Dehkadeh (Persian: دهكده) is a village in Kuh Panj Rural District, in the Central District of Bardsir County, Kerman Province, Iran. At the 2006 census, its population was 61, in 13 families.
