= Hamidiyeh County =

County in Khuzestan province, Iran

Hamidiyeh County Persian: شهرستان حمیدیه
- County
- Location of Hamidiyeh County in Khuzestan province (center left, pink)

- Location of Khuzestan province in Iran
- Coordinates: 31°30′N 48°30′E
- Country: Iran
- Province: Khuzestan
- Capital: Hamidiyeh
- Districts: Central, Gambueh

Population (2016)
  - Total: 53,762
- Time zone: UTC+3:30 (IRST)

Hamidiyeh County (Persian: شهرستان حمیدیه) is in Khuzestan province, Iran. Its capital is the city of Hamidiyeh.

== History ==
After the 2011 National Census, Hamidiyeh District was separated from Ahvaz County in the establishment of Hamidiyeh County, which was divided into two districts of two rural districts each, with Hamidiyeh as its capital and only city.

== Demographics ==
=== Population ===
At the time of the 2016 census, the district's population was 53,762 in 13,598 households.

=== Administrative divisions ===
Hamidiyeh County's population and administrative structure are shown in the following table.

Hamidiyeh County Population
Administrative Divisions	2016
Central District	39,897
Dehkadeh RD	8,496
Karkheh RD	9,344
Hamidiyeh (city)	22,057
Gambueh District	13,865
Jahad RD	8,598
Tarrah RD	5,267
Total	53,762
RD = Rural District

== See also ==
Media related to Hamidiyeh County at Wikimedia Commons
