= Pariz Rural District =

Rural district in Kerman province, Iran

Pariz Rural District Persian: دهستان پاريز
- Rural District
- Location within Iran
- Coordinates: 29°51′43″N 55°45′30″E
- Country: Iran
- Province: Kerman
- County: Sirjan
- District: Pariz
- Capital: Pariz

Population (2016)
  - Total: 6,165
- Time zone: UTC+3:30 (IRST)

Pariz Rural District (Persian: دهستان پاريز) is in Pariz District of Sirjan County, Kerman province, Iran. It is administered from the city of Pariz.

== Demographics ==
=== Population ===
At the time of the 2006 National Census, the rural district's population was 3,065 in 786 households. There were 2,869 inhabitants in 835 households at the following census of 2011. The 2016 census measured the population of the rural district as 6,165 in 2,032 households. The most populous of its 222 villages was Gostuiyeh, with 1,593 people.
