= Tarrah Rural District =

Rural district in Khuzestan province, Iran

Tarrah Rural District Persian: دهستان طراح
- Rural District
- Location within Iran
- Coordinates: 31°22′55″N 48°22′47″E
- Country: Iran
- Province: Khuzestan
- County: Hamidiyeh
- District: Gambueh
- Capital: Tarrah-e Yek

Population (2016)
  - Total: 5,267
- Time zone: UTC+3:30 (IRST)

Tarrah Rural District (Persian: دهستان طراح) is in Gambueh District of Hamidiyeh County, Khuzestan province, Iran. Its capital is the village of Tarrah-e Yek. The previous capital of the rural district was the village of Dehkadeh.

== Demographics ==
=== Population ===
At the time of the 2006 National Census, the rural district's population (as part of the former Hamidiyeh District of Ahvaz County) was 9,450 in 1,522 households. There were 10,337 inhabitants in 2,191 households at the following census of 2011. The 2016 census measured the population of the rural district as 5,267 in 1,328 households, by which time the district had been separated from the county in the establishment of Hamidiyeh County. The rural district was transferred to the new Gambueh District. The most populous of its 15 villages was Tarrah-e Yek, with 1,619 people.
