= Jahad Rural District =

Rural district in Khuzestan province, Iran

Jahad Rural District Persian: دهستان جهاد
- Rural District
- Location within Iran
- Coordinates: 31°22′46″N 48°28′14″E
- Country: Iran
- Province: Khuzestan
- County: Hamidiyeh
- District: Gambueh
- Capital: Gambueh-ye Bozorg

Population (2016)
  - Total: 8,598
- Time zone: UTC+3:30 (IRST)

Jahad Rural District (Persian: دهستان جهاد) is in Gambueh District of Hamidiyeh County, Khuzestan province, Iran. Its capital is the village of Gambueh-ye Bozorg.

== Demographics ==
=== Population ===
At the time of the 2006 National Census, the rural district's population (as part of the former Hamidiyeh District of Ahvaz County) was 6,756 in 1,141 households. There were 6,003 inhabitants in 1,333 households at the following census of 2011. The 2016 census measured the population of the rural district as 8,598 in 2,118 households, by which time the district had been separated from the county in the establishment of Hamidiyeh County. The rural district was transferred to the new Gambueh District. The most populous of its 38 villages was Gambueh-ye Bozorg, with 2,692 people.
