= Saadatabad Rural District =

Rural district in Kerman province, Iran

Saadatabad Rural District Persian: دهستان سعادت‌آباد
- Rural District
- Location within Iran
- Coordinates: 29°40′53″N 55°50′05″E
- Country: Iran
- Province: Kerman
- County: Sirjan
- District: Pariz
- Capital: Hamashahr

Population (2016)
  - Total: 5,057
- Time zone: UTC+3:30 (IRST)

Saadatabad Rural District (Persian: دهستان سعادت‌آباد) is in Pariz District of Sirjan County, Kerman province, Iran. It is administered from the city of Hamashahr. (Note: Formerly the village of Saadatabad)

== Demographics ==
=== Population ===
At the time of the 2006 National Census, the rural district's population was 5,790 in 1,341 households. There were 2,175 inhabitants in 682 households at the following census of 2011. The 2016 census measured the population of the rural district as 5,057 in 1,657 households. The most populous of its 94 villages was Korran, with 533 people.
