= Karkheh Rural District =

Rural district in Khuzestan province, Iran

Karkheh Rural District Persian: دهستان كرخه
- Rural District
- Location within Iran
- Coordinates: 31°37′04″N 48°25′42″E
- Country: Iran
- Province: Khuzestan
- County: Hamidiyeh
- District: Central
- Capital: Alavoneh-ye Fay

Population (2016)
  - Total: 9,344
- Time zone: UTC+3:30 (IRST)

Karkheh Rural District (Persian: دهستان كرخه) is in the Central District of Hamidiyeh County, Khuzestan province, Iran. Its capital is the village of Alavoneh-ye Fay. The previous capital of the rural district was the village of Dehkadeh.

== Demographics ==
=== Population ===
At the time of the 2006 National Census, the rural district's population (as part of the former Hamidiyeh District of Ahvaz County) was 10,189 in 1,779 households. There were 9,580 inhabitants in 2,256 households at the following census of 2011. The 2016 census measured the population of the rural district as 9,344 in 2,620 households, by which time the district had been separated from the county in the establishment of Hamidiyeh County. The rural district was transferred to the new Central District. The most populous of its 19 villages was Alavoneh-ye Fay, with 2,158 people.
