= Pariz District =

District in Kerman province, Iran

Pariz District Persian: بخش پاریز
- District
- Location within Iran
- Coordinates: 29°43′00″N 55°46′14″E
- Country: Iran
- Province: Kerman
- County: Sirjan
- Capital: Pariz

Population (2016)
  - Total: 22,538
- Time zone: UTC+3:30 (IRST)

Pariz District (Persian: بخش پاریز) is in Sirjan County, Kerman province, Iran. Its capital is the city of Pariz.

== History ==
After the 2006 National Census, the village of Saadatabad merged with several villages to become the city of Hamashahr.

== Demographics ==
=== Population ===
At the time of the 2006 National Census, the district's population was 13,382 in 3,358 households. The following census in 2011 counted 12,746 people in 3,724 households. The 2016 census measured the population of the district as 22,538 inhabitants in 7,323 households.

=== Administrative divisions ===
Pariz District Population
Administrative Divisions	2006	2011	2016
Pariz RD	3,065	2,869	6,165
Saadatabad RD	5,790	2,175	5,057
Hamashahr (city) (Note: Formerly the village of Saadatabad)		2,800	3,311
Pariz (city)	4,527	4,902	8,005
Total	13,382	12,746	22,538
RD = Rural District
