= Hamidiyeh District =

Former district in Khuzestan province, Iran

Hamidiyeh District Persian: بخش حمیدیه
- Former District
- Location within Iran
- Coordinates: 31°30′N 48°30′E
- Country: Iran
- Province: Khuzestan
- County: Ahvaz
- Capital: Hamidiyeh

Population (2011)
  - Total: 46,902
- Time zone: UTC+3:30 (IRST)

Hamidiyeh District (Persian: بخش حمیدیه) is a former administrative division of Ahvaz County, Khuzestan province, Iran. Its capital was the city of Hamidiyeh.

== History ==
In 2011, the district was separated from the county in the establishment of Hamidiyeh County.

== Demographics ==
=== Population ===
At the time of the 2006 National Census, the district's population was 48,372 in 8,391 households. The following census in 2011 counted 46,902 people in 10,511 households.

=== Administrative divisions ===
Hamidiyeh District Population
| Administrative Divisions | 2006 | 2011 |
|---|---|---|
| Jahad RD | 6,756 | 6,003 |
| Karkheh RD | 10,189 | 9,580 |
| Tarrah RD | 9,450 | 10,337 |
| Hamidiyeh (city) | 21,977 | 20,982 |
| Total | 48,372 | 46,902 |
RD = Rural District
