= Jenish =

Jenish Kyrgyz: Жеңиш
- Location within Kyrgyzstan
- Coordinates: 40°12′44″N 71°37′58″E
- Country: Kyrgyzstan
- Region: Batken Region
- District: Kadamjay District
- Elevation: 762 m (2,500 ft)

Population (2021)
  - Total: 6,274
- Time zone: UTC+6

Jenish (Kyrgyz: Жеңиш) previously known as Khalmion (Kyrgyz: Халмион, romanized: Khalmion) is a village in Kadamjay District, Batken Region in south-west Kyrgyzstan, sitting practically on the border with Uzbekistan's Fergana Region. Its population was 6,274 in 2021. The village lies just to the west of the tiny enclave Jangail (40°12′10″N 71°39′50″E) belonging to Uzbekistan, less than 1 km^{2} in area. This enclave is located north-northwest of another Uzbek enclave (Shakhimardan). The Kyrgyz villages of Jenish and Jangy-Ayyl (40°10′56″N 71°40′49″E) lie outside opposite edges of this enclave, within 1 km of the Kyrgyz-Uzbek main border.

== Population ==
Historical population
Year	Pop.	±% p.a.
2009	4,602	—
2021	6,274	+2.62%
Note: resident population; Sources:
