= Jiydelik Cave =

Karst cave and protected area in Kyrgyzstan

- Жийделик үңкүрү
- Location in Kyrgyzstan
- Location: Kadamjay District, Batken Region, Kyrgyzstan
- Nearest city: Kadamjay
- Coordinates: 40.0895°N 71.7165°E
- Designation: Geological reserve
- Established: 1975

Jiydelik Cave (Kyrgyz: Жийделик үңкүрү) is a karst cave and protected natural site in Kadamjay District, Batken Region, Kyrgyzstan. It is located on the right bank of the Shaimerden River, near the town of Kadamjay. The cave has a total length of 180 m (590 ft). The cave contains several chambers and is characterized by formations produced by the deposition of crystalline and mineral substances from dripping water. Warm-water lakes occur in its lower chamber. The cave is inhabited by lesser horseshoe bats (Rhinolophus hipposideros). Jiydelik Cave has been protected as a geological reserve since 1975.
