= Teskey, Kyrgyzstan =

Teskey Kyrgyz: Тескей
- Location within Kyrgyzstan
- Coordinates: 39°54′0″N 71°17′0″E
- Country: Kyrgyzstan
- Region: Batken
- District: Kadamjay

Population (2021)
  - Total: 191
- Time zone: UTC+6

Teskey (Kyrgyz: Тескей, romanized: Teskey) is a village in Batken Region of Kyrgyzstan. It is part of the Kadamjay District. Its population was 191 in 2021.

Nearby towns and villages include Aydarken (6 km or 4 mi) and Kichi-Aydarken (8 km or 5 mi).
