= Kichi-Aydarken =

Kichi-Aydarken Kyrgyz: Кичи-Айдаркен
- Location within Kyrgyzstan
- Coordinates: 39°56′20″N 71°21′20″E
- Country: Kyrgyzstan
- Region: Batken
- District: Kadamjay
- Elevation: 2,734 m (8,970 ft)

Population (2021)
  - Total: 1,204
- Time zone: UTC+6

Kichi-Aydarken (Kyrgyz: Кичи-Айдаркен, romanized: Kichi-Aydarken) is a village in Batken Region of Kyrgyzstan. It is part of the Kadamjay District. Its population was 1,204 in 2021. It lies adjacent to the east of the city Aydarken.
