= Sovet, Batken =

Sovet Kyrgyz: Совет
- Location within Kyrgyzstan
- Coordinates: 40°10′0″N 71°18′40″E
- Country: Kyrgyzstan
- Region: Batken
- District: Kadamjay
- Elevation: 1,030 m (3,380 ft)

Population (2021)
  - Total: 1,502
- Time zone: UTC+6 (KGT)

Sovet (Kyrgyz: Совет, romanized: Sovet, Russian: Советский, romanized: Sovetskiy) is a village in Kadamjay District of Batken Region of Kyrgyzstan. Its population was 1,502 in 2021. Until 2012 it was an urban-type settlement.

Nearby towns and villages include Alga (18 km or 11 mi), Kyrgyz-Kyshtak (6 miles) and Örükzar (10 km or 6 mi).

== Population ==
Historical population
| Year | Pop. | ±% p.a. |
|---|---|---|
| 1970 | 2,030 | — |
| 1979 | 2,308 | +1.44% |
| 1989 | 1,771 | −2.61% |
| 1999 | 1,331 | −2.82% |
| 2009 | 1,280 | −0.39% |
| 2021 | 1,502 | +1.34% |
Note: resident population; Sources:
