= Pülgön =

Pülgön Kyrgyz: Пүлгөн
- Location within Kyrgyzstan
- Coordinates: 40°08′20″N 71°43′50″E
- Country: Kyrgyzstan
- Region: Batken
- District: Kadamjay
- Elevation: 1,044 m (3,425 ft)

Population (2021)
  - Total: 3,014
- Time zone: UTC+6

Pülgön (Kyrgyz: Пүлгөн, romanized: Pülgön, Russian: Пульгон, romanized: Pul'gon) is a village in the Batken Region of Kyrgyzstan. Administratively, it is part of the city Kadamjay within the Kadamjay District. Until 2012, it was the administrative center of the Kadamjay District. Its population was 3,014 in 2021. In the Soviet era, the village was officially known as Frunzenskoye, and the district was known as Frunzensky District (Frunze District) of Osh Region.

The village is located next to Kyrgyzstan's border with Uzbekistan. The antimony miners' town of Kadamjay (formerly known as Frunze) is immediately adjacent to the village from the south. Another nearby town is Orozbekovo (6 miles).
