= Tegirmech =

Tegirmech Kyrgyz: Тегирмеч
- Location within Kyrgyzstan
- Coordinates: 40°18′59″N 72°08′45″E
- Country: Kyrgyzstan
- Region: Batken Region
- District: Kadamjay District
- Elevation: 1,067 m (3,501 ft)

Population (2021)
  - Total: 2,948
- Time zone: UTC+6

Tegirmech (Kyrgyz: Тегирмеч, romanized: Tegirmech, previously known as Valakish) is a village in the Kadamjay District of Batken Region of Kyrgyzstan. The population amounted to 2,948 in 2021.
