= Chungkur-Kyshtak =

Chungkur-Kyshtak Kyrgyz: Чуңкур-Кыштак Uzbek: Chunqur-Qishloq
- Location within Kyrgyzstan
- Coordinates: 40°15′30″N 71°30′10″E
- Country: Kyrgyzstan
- Region: Batken Region
- District: Kadamjay District

Population (2021)
  - Total: 2,240
- Time zone: UTC+6

Chungkur-Kyshtak (Kyrgyz: Чуңкур-Кыштак; Uzbek: Chunqur-Qishloq) is a village in Batken Region of Kyrgyzstan. It is part of the Kadamjay District. Its population was 2,240 in 2021.

Nearby villages include Alga (2.4 km or 1 1/2 mi) and Chimyon (Uzbekistan, 5 km or 3 mi).
