= Ötükchü =

Village in Batken Region, Kyrgyzstan

Ötükchü Kyrgyz: Өтүкчү Otukchu
- Village
- Location within Kyrgyzstan
- Coordinates: 40°06′49″N 71°05′34″E
- Country: Kyrgyzstan
- Region: Batken Region
- District: Kadamjay District
- Rural community: Ak-Turpak
- Elevation: 956 m (3,136 ft)

Population (2022)
  - Total: 524
- Time zone: UTC+6 (KGT)

Ötükchü (Kyrgyz: Өтүкчү), also known as Otukchu, is a village in the Kadamjay District of Batken Region, Kyrgyzstan. It forms part of the Ak-Turpak rural community. Its population was 524 in 2022.

The village is listed in the 2025 state administrative-territorial classifier under SOATE code 41705258804060.

== Geography ==
Ötükchü lies near the eastern boundary of the Uzbek exclave of Sokh, in the eastern part of Batken Region. A bridge connects the village with Tul in the exclave. The village is situated at an elevation of approximately 956 metres (3,136 ft) above sea level.

== Population ==
The village had a resident population of 614 at the 2009 census and 524 at the 2022 census.

Historical population
Year	Pop.	±%
2009	614	—
2022	524	−14.7%
Resident population. Sources: Census results.
