= Kyzyl-Bulak, Batken =

Kyzyl-Bulak Kyrgyz: Кызыл-Булак
- Location within Kyrgyzstan
- Coordinates: 40°01′48″N 71°45′00″E
- Country: Kyrgyzstan
- Region: Batken Region
- District: Kadamjay District

Government
  - Governor: Murzazhanov Altynbek Samatovich
- Elevation: 1,267 m (4,157 ft)

Population (2023)
  - Total: 2,286
- Time zone: UTC+6

Kyzyl-Bulak (Kyrgyz: Кызыл-Булак) is a village in Batken Region of Kyrgyzstan. It is part of the Kadamjay District. Its population was 2,272 in 2021.

Nearby towns and villages include Orozbekov (6 km (4 mi)) and Kadamjay (10 km (6 mi)).
