= Kojo-Korum =

Kojo-Korum Kyrgyz: Кожо-Корум
- Location within Kyrgyzstan
- Coordinates: 40°4′48″N 71°18′36″E
- Country: Kyrgyzstan
- Region: Batken Region
- District: Kadamjay District
- Elevation: 1,681 m (5,515 ft)

Population (2021)
  - Total: 72
- Time zone: UTC+6

Kojo-Korum (Kyrgyz: Кожо-Корум) is a village in Batken Region of Kyrgyzstan. It is part of the Kadamjay District. Its population was 72 in 2021. Nearby towns and villages include Sovet (11 km or 7 mi) and Böjöy (11 km or 7 mi).
