= List of cities in Kyrgyzstan =

This is a list of the 33 official cities (Kyrgyz: шаар, Russian: город) in Kyrgyzstan. In addition, there are 12 smaller urban-type settlements (Kyrgyz: шаар тибиндеги посёлок, Russian: посёлок городского типа) in Kyrgyzstan.

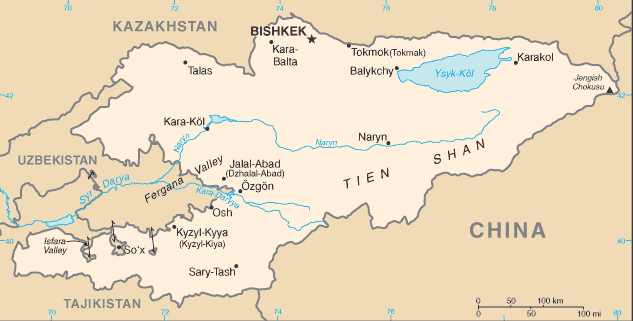
Map of Kyrgyzstan

== List ==
There are three types of cities:

1. cities of republican significance
2. cities of regional significance
3. cities of district significance

Insignia	Name English	Name Kyrgyz	Previous name	City since	1979	1989	1999	2009	2019	2023	Status	Oblus
	Aydarken	Айдаркен	Хайдаркан	1941					11,759	10,998	3	Batken
	Balykchy	Балыкчы	Рыбачье, Иссык-Куль	1884	33,110	42,438	41,342	42,380	48,622	52,692	2	Issyk-Kul
	Batken	Баткен		1934				13,435	18,263	28,964	2	Batken
	Bazar-Korgon	Базар-Коргон		2021				33,359	39,208	59,152	3	Jalal-Abad
	Bishkek	Бишкек	Пишпек, Фрунзе	1868	525,989	616,586	758,204	831,632	1,012,500	1,145,044	1	Bishkek city
	Cholpon-Ata	Чолпон-Ата		1922	7,221	9,669	8,851	10,525	13,627	12,648	3	Issyk-Kul
	Gülchö	Гүлчө		2025			14,397	11,691	13,755	14,083		Osh
	Jalal-Abad	Жалал-Абад	Жалалабат	1870	54,559	70,855	70,401	89,004	109,189	129,378	2	Jalal-Abad
	Kadamjay	Кадамжай	Фрунзе	1938					7,152	15,213	3	Batken
	Kant	Кант		1934	32,709	38,374	22,075	21,589	21,985	23,407	3	Chüy
	Kara-Balta	Кара-Балта	имени Микояна, Калининское	1825	46,970	53,887	47,159	37,834	46,911	52,933	3	Chüy
	Karakol	Каракол	Пржевальск	1869	50,685	61,521	64,322	63,377	76,509	81,952	2	Issyk-Kul
	Kara-Köl	Кара-Көл		1962	17,080	22,225	20,006	20,744	22,050	27,460	2	Jalal-Abad
	Kara-Suu	Кара-Cуу		1917	18,586	18,914	19,143	20,862	25,469	27,243	3	Osh
	Kayyngdy	Кайынды	Молотовский		10,644	11,716	9,085	7,526	9,265	10,152	3	Chüy
	Kemin	Кемин	Быстрорецкое, Быстро́вка	1912					10,095	8,758	3	Chüy
	Kerben	Кербен	Караван	1930				14,141	18,196	26,789	3	Jalal-Abad
	Kochkor-Ata	Кочкор-Ата		1952	12,460	16,149	16,104	14,814	16,829	18,289	3	Jalal-Abad
	Kök-Janggak	Көк-Жаңгак	Кок-Янгак	1910	17,281	18,837	10,727	10,451	11,786	12,335	2	Jalal-Abad
	Kyzyl-Kiya	Кызыл-Кыя		1898	31,926	36,822	31,844	31,727	40,309	61,144	2	Batken
	Mayluu-Suu	Майлуу-Суу	Майли-Сай	1946	27,424	32,422	23,008	22,853	22,347	26,454	2	Jalal-Abad
	Naryn	Нарын	укрепление Нарынское, Нарынская слободка	1868	29 833	42 210	40 050	34,822	40,065	41,988	2	Naryn
	Nookat	Ноокат	Эски-Ноокат	1823	2,507	2,580	1,828	16,125	17,242	16,118	3	Osh
	Orlovka	Орловка		1910					6,111	7,244	3	Chüy
	Osh	Oш		ancient	167,498	211,045	208,520	232,816	270,347	361,273	1	Osh city
	Özgön	Өзгөн		ancient	29,214	34,167	41,497	49,410	60,236		3	Osh
	Razzakov	Раззаков	Асбаникат, Аспаникент, Асбани, Аспана, Асвона, Исвона, Исфана, Isfana	Middle Ages				18,244	22,139	34,597	3	Batken
	Shopokov	Шопоков	Новотроицкое, Краснооктябрьский		9,483	9,708	9,133	8,749	9,971		3	Chüy
	Sülüktü	Сүлүктү		1868	18,111	21,406	20,490	20,010	14,472		2	Batken
	Talas	Tалас	Дмитриевка	1877	22,089	30,520	32,638	32,886	38,700		2	Talas
	Tash-Kömür	Таш-Көмүр	Нарын	1930	25,002	35,982	36,586	31,480	23,228		2	Jalal-Abad
	Tokmok	Tокмок		1825	58,003	72,927	59,409	53,231	64,534		2	Chüy
	Toktogul	Токтогул	Музтөр		12,391	16,381	16,101	16,429	19,864		3	Jalal-Abad

== Gallery ==
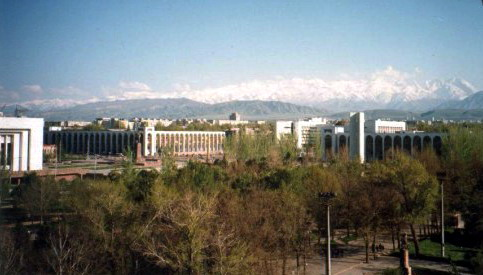
Bishkek, Capital of Kyrgyzstan

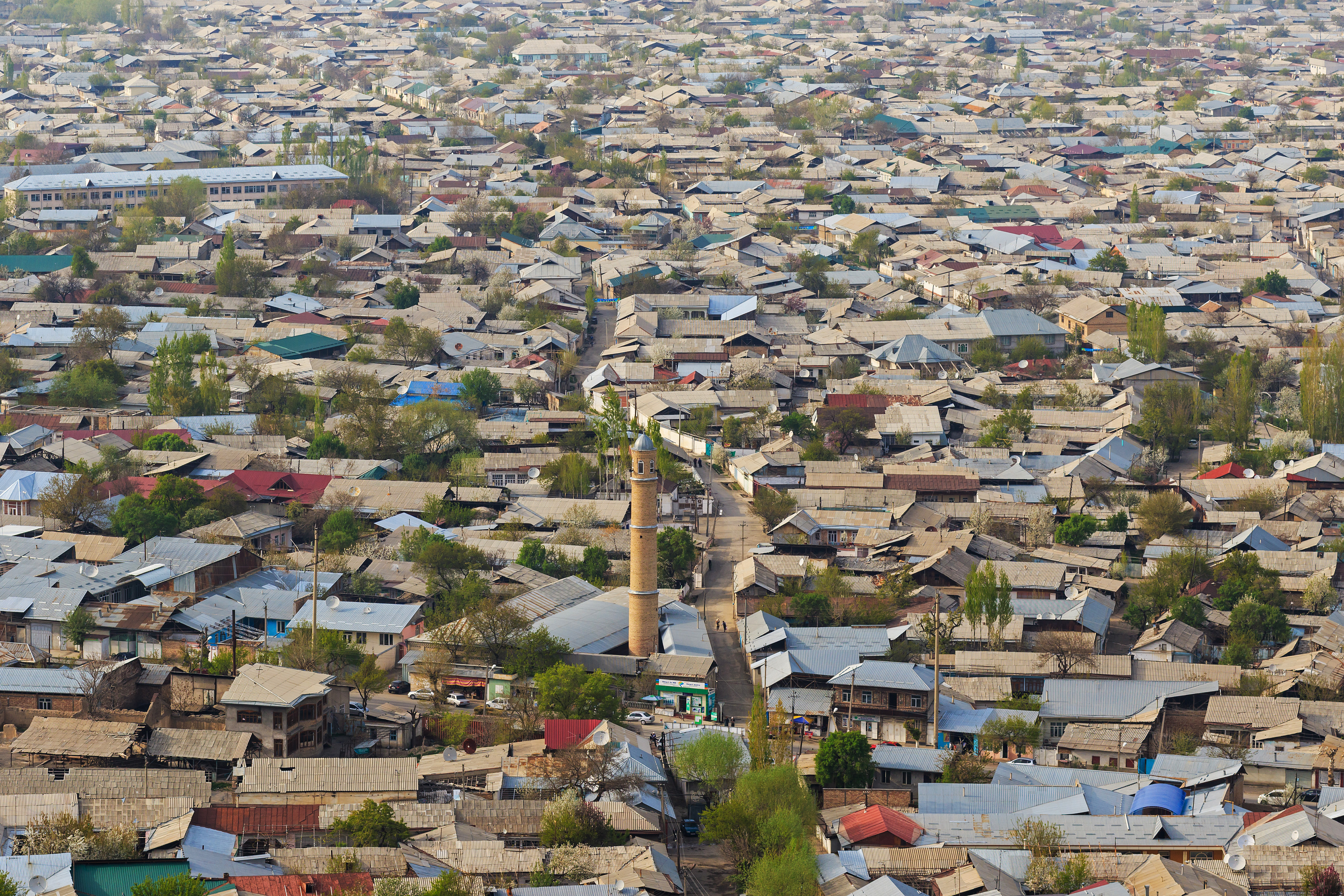
Osh

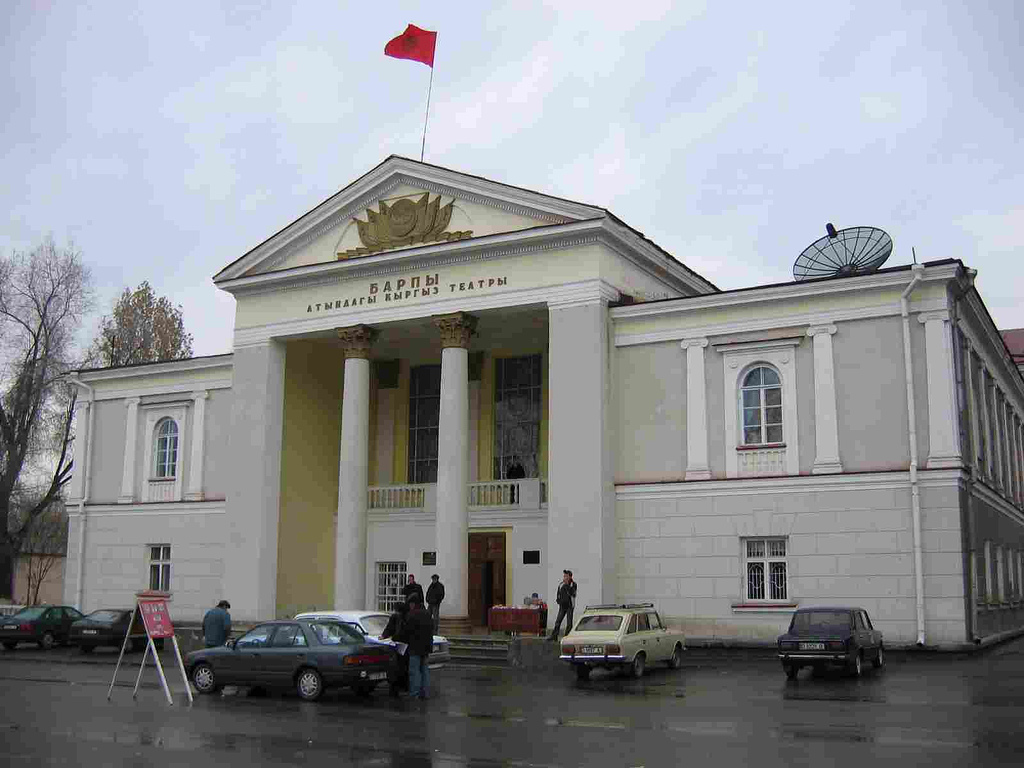
Jalal-Abad

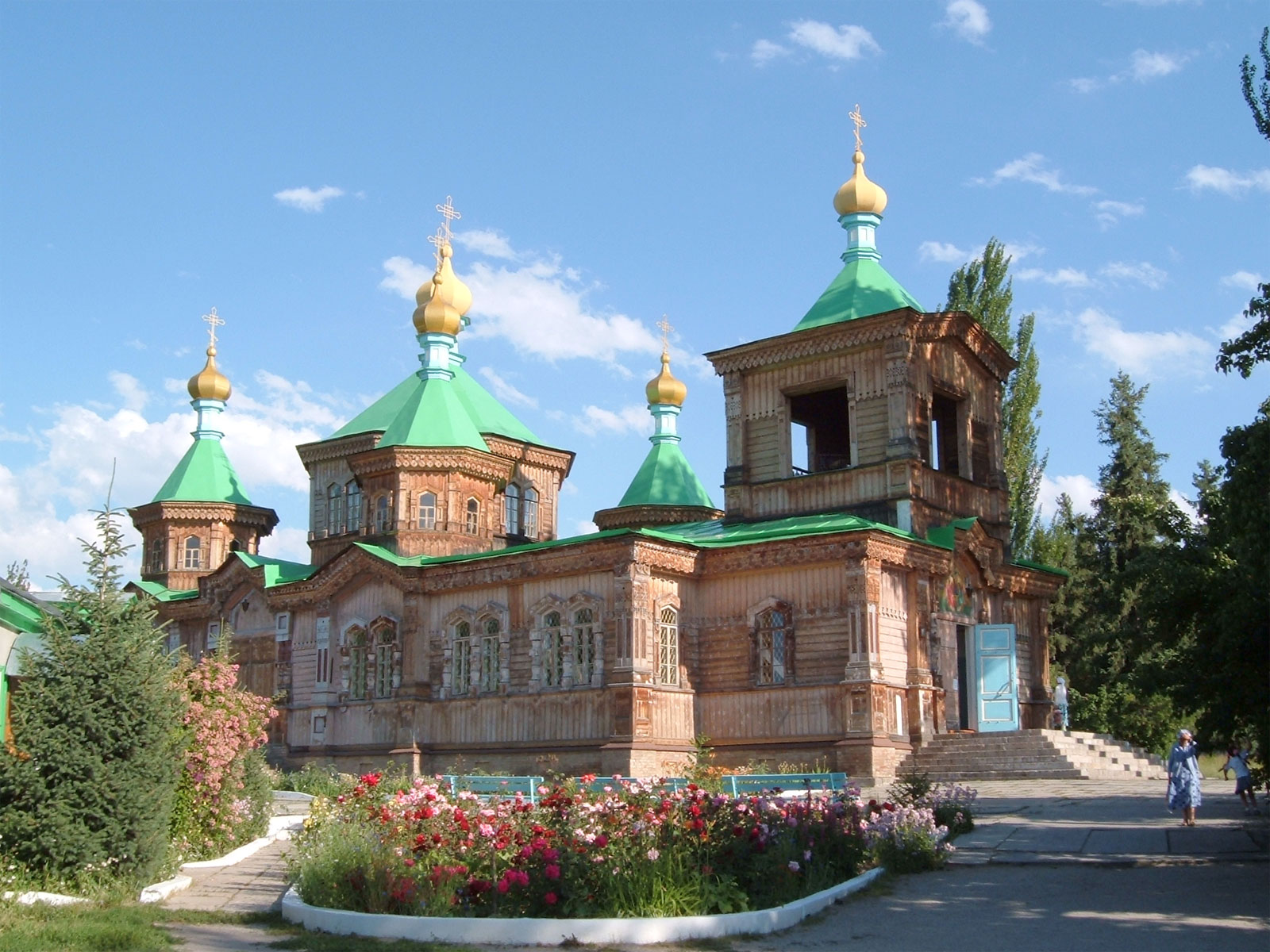
Karakol
