= Örükzar =

Örükzar Kyrgyz: Өрүкзар
- Location within Kyrgyzstan
- Coordinates: 40°16′N 71°11′E
- Country: Kyrgyzstan
- Region: Batken Region
- District: Kadamjay District

Population (2021)
  - Total: 3,374

Örükzar (Kyrgyz: Өрүкзар, romanized: Örükzar) is a village in Batken Region of Kyrgyzstan. Located in Burgondu valley, which is on the south fringe of Fergana valley. Its population was 3,374 in 2021.
