= Orozbekov, Kyrgyzstan =

Orozbekov Kyrgyz: Орозбеков
- Location within Kyrgyzstan
- Coordinates: 40°03′40″N 71°41′00″E
- Country: Kyrgyzstan
- Region: Batken
- District: Kadamjay
- Elevation: 1,427 m (4,682 ft)

Population (2021)
  - Total: 3,503
- Time zone: UTC+6

Orozbekov (Kyrgyz: Орозбеков, romanized: Orozbekov) is a village in Batken Region of Kyrgyzstan. It is part of the Kadamjay District. It has 7 main zones: Garaj, Kuldu, Boston, Zar, Joo-Kesek, Naiman and Uchkun. Its population was 3,503 in 2021. The village was named after politician Abdukadyr Urazbekov.

Nearby towns and villages include Kyzyl-Bulak (5 km or 3 mi) and Kadamjay (8 km or 5 mi).

== Population ==
Historical population
Year	Pop.	±% p.a.
2009	5,356	—
2021	3,503	−3.48%
Note: resident population; Sources:
