= Ak-Turpak =

Ak-Turpak Kyrgyz: Ак-Турпак
- Location within Kyrgyzstan
- Coordinates: 40°11′20″N 71°3′10″E
- Country: Kyrgyzstan
- Region: Batken Region
- District: Kadamjay District
- Elevation: 894 m (2,933 ft)

Population (2021)
  - Total: 684
- Time zone: UTC+6

Ak-Turpak (Kyrgyz: Ак-Турпак) is a village in Batken Region of Kyrgyzstan. It is part of the Kadamjay District. Its population was 684 in 2021.
