= Abdukadyr Urazbekov =

Kyrgyz politician

- Абдыкадыр Орозбеков
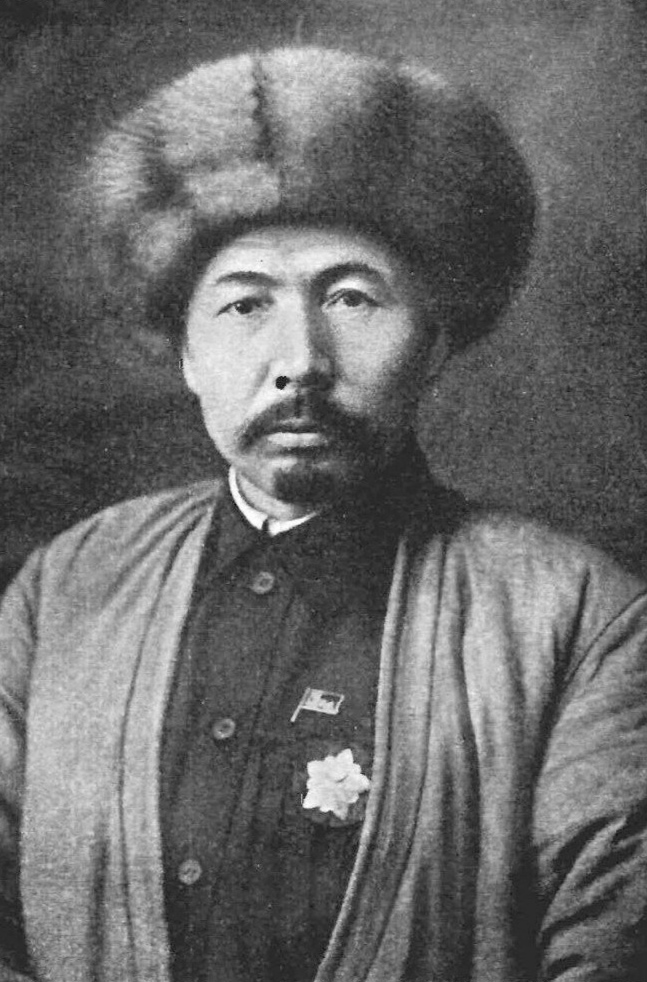

Chairman of the Presidium of the Central Executive Committee of the Kirghiz ASSR
- In office 12 March 1927 – 23 March 1937
- Preceded by: Imanaly Aidarbekov as Chairman of the Kara-Kyrgyz Revolutionary Committee
- Succeeded by: Office disestablished

First Chairman of the Central Executive Committee of the Kirghiz Soviet Socialist Republic
- In office 23 March 1937 – 16 September 1937
- Preceded by: Office established
- Succeeded by: Moldogazy Tokobaev

Personal details
- Born: 1889 Ohna, Fergana Oblast, Russian Empire
- Died: 1938 (aged 48–49) Tash-Döbö, Chüy Region, KSSR, USSR
- Party: Communist Party of the Soviet Union
- Awards: Order of the Red Banner of Labour
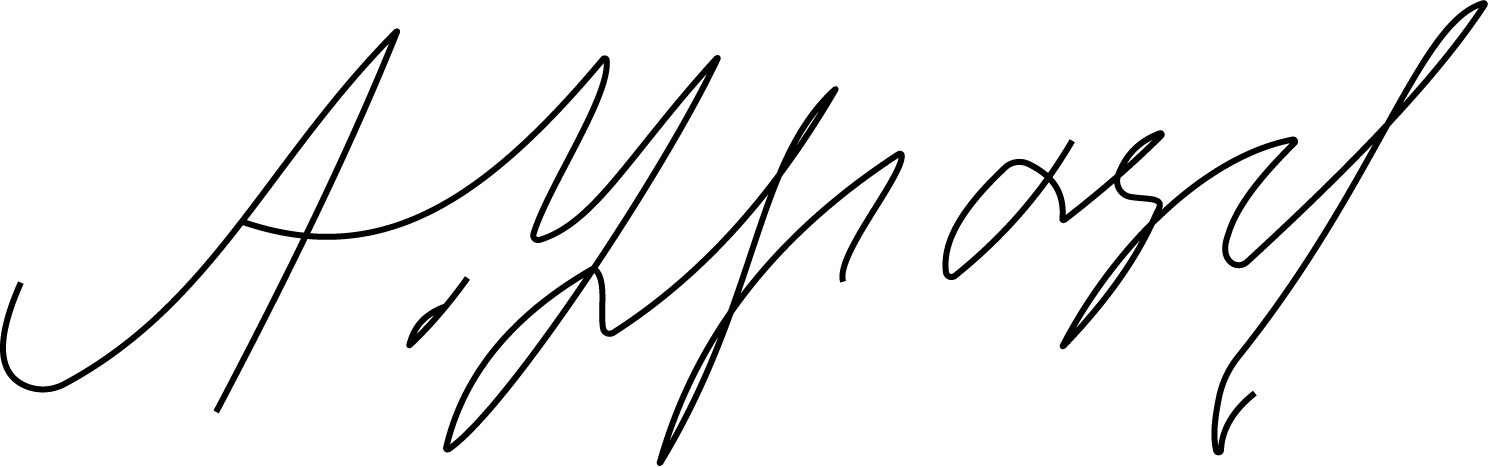
- Signature

Abdukadyr Urazbekov (Kyrgyz: Абдыкадыр Орозбеков; 1889 – November 1938) was the Chairman of the Presidium of the Central Executive Committee of the Kirghiz ASSR (1927–1937) and the first Chairman of the Central Executive Committee of the Kirghiz Soviet Socialist Republic (1937).

== Biography ==
Abdukadyr Urazbekov was born into a poor Kyrgyz family on 1889, in Ohna village (today's Kadamjai district, Batken region of the Kyrgyzstan) Fergana Oblast, Russian Empire. He is the son of a poor farmer who died shortly after the birth of Abdukadyr. In 1907–1916, he worked as a baker and took part in the "Andijan uprising" against conscription into the tsarist army. In January 1917 he was arrested for organizing a bakers' strike.

In August 1918 he joined the Communist Party. In the same year he became a member of the Board of the Ferghana Union of Craftsmen, Workers and Employees, in 1918-1919 he was elected a member of the Fergana Regional Council and the Margelan District Executive Committee.

Abdukadyr Urazbekov participated in the labor movement of Turkestan. He fought for the establishment and strengthening of Soviet power in Kyrgyzstan.

In 1919–1920 he served as a private in the headquarters of the Red Guard of Ferghana.

Abdukadyr Urazbekov participated in the Russian civil war and was an organizer and commander the fight from the Basmachi movement.

In 1920–1923, he managed the revolutionary committees of the village, bolus, and district.

In 1924–1925, he was the head and secretary of the land department of the Osh District Workers' Council. He was a delegate to the organizing congress of the Workers', Peasants' and Soldiers' Deputies' Council of the Tooluu Kara Kyrgyz Region, where he was elected as the chairman of the Tooluu Kara Kyrgyz Regional AK (Executive Committee).

In 1927–1937, he was the Chairman of the Presidium of the Central Executive Committee of the Kirghiz ASSR.

In 1937, Urazbekov became the first Chairman of the Central Executive Committee of the Kirghiz Soviet Socialist Republic. The same year, he was dismissed and arrested, and in 1938 executed during the Great Purge.

== Political life ==
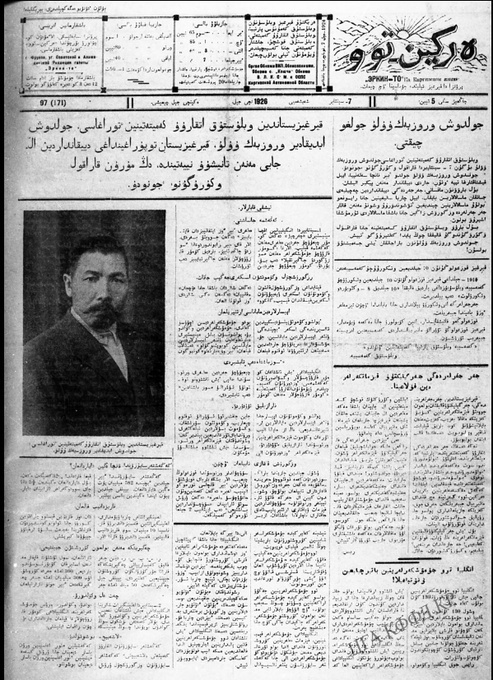
Abdukadyr Urazbekov in the newspaper "Erkin-Too", 1926 year

Abdukadyr Urazbekov was one of the first Kyrgyz who replenished the army of hired workers in the conditions of the property stratification of the Kyrgyz Kyshtaks. He was one of the few Kyrgyz whose revolutionary consciousness was formed in an international proletarian environment. It was in it that he went from an ordinary participant in strikes to their organizer, initiator of the creation of a trade union of workers.

Urazbekov began his prominent activity in the revolutionary movements of 1916 in the Fergana Valley, when an uprising of a national liberation character took place, brutally suppressed by the tsarist authorities.

The main reason for the unrest was the decree of the Russian emperor issued on June 25 on the so-called "requisition of foreigners" for rear work, which caused a sharp protest among the indigenous population of many regions of Central Asia.

Later, in 1918–1920, served in the Red Army. At the beginning of 1918, A. Urazbekov joined the ranks of the Communist Party. Participated in the labor movement of Turkestan. Actively fought for the establishment and strengthening of Soviet power in Kyrgyzstan. During the Civil War, he went from an ordinary soldier to a detachment commander and commissar. In the 1920s, the Party sent him to work in the countryside. There he led and personally participated in military operations against the Basmachi bands – the armed counter-revolutionary nationalist movement of the feudal Bai bourgeoisie.

In 1925 he was elected chairman of the Kara-Kyrgyz regional executive committee. In March 1927, A. Urazbekov became the Chairman of the Presidium of the Central Executive Committee of the Kirghiz ASSR, and after the formation of the union republic in March 1937, he became the first Chairman of the Central Executive Committee of the Kirghiz Soviet Socialist Republic. In the 1930s, he headed the central commission for the development of a new Kyrgyz alphabet, headed the V. Lenin Foundation for helping homeless children. During his reign, the Kyrgyz and Russian drama theaters, many higher educational institutions, the Kyrgyz State Philharmonic were opened. It is he, according to historians, who can be called (according to the position he held) the first Kyrgyz president.

== Honours ==
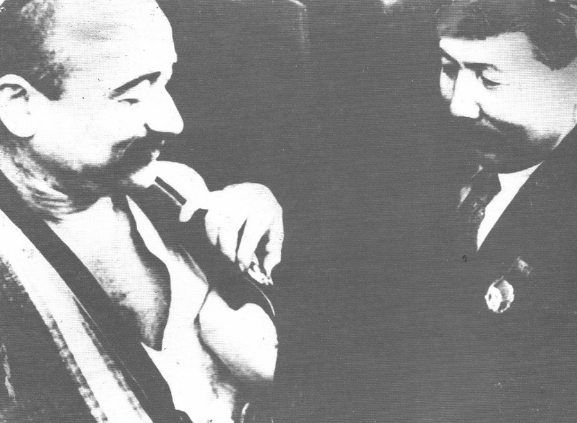
Awarding the Order of Lenin, 1936

For the establishment of Soviet Power on the territory of the Ferghana Valley A. Urazbekov was awarded the "Golden Badge" of the Turkestan in 1924.

On May 3, 1932, Urazbekov was awarded the Order of the Red Banner of Labour for the successes achieved in the development of the Republic.

== Legacy ==
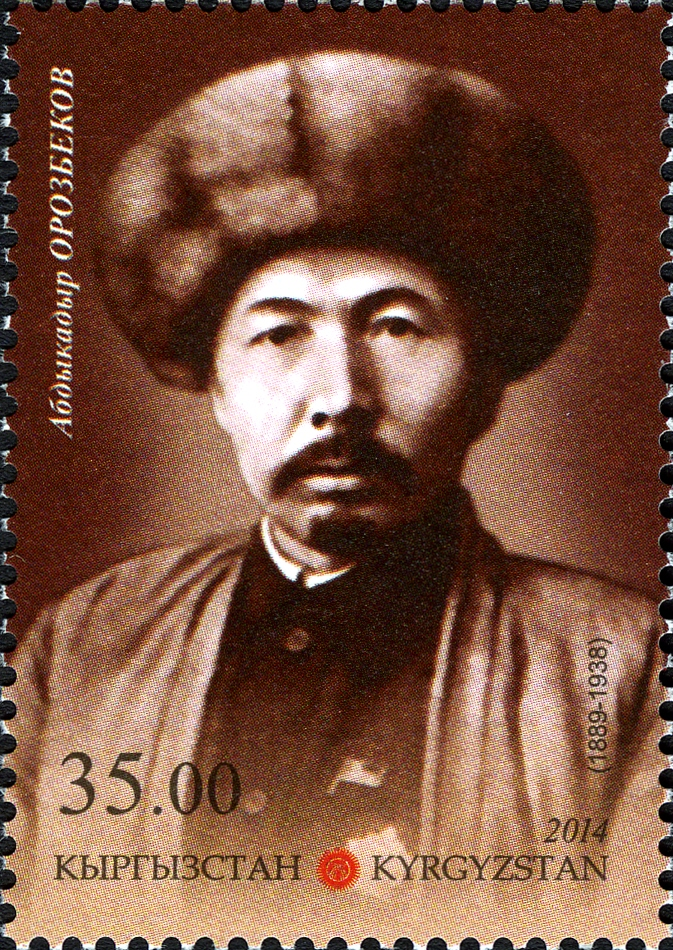
Stamp of Kyrgyzstan, 2014

- One of the central streets of Bishkek is named after Abdukadyr Urazbekov.
- On Pushkin Street a bust was erected, the author of which is the sculptor Aidarbek Usukeev.
- In 2014, a postage stamp of Kyrgyzstan was issued.
- In 2019, in honor of the 130th anniversary of the birth of Abdukadyr Urazbekov, a monument was erected in his small homeland, in the village of Ohna.
