= Ernesto Inarkiev =

Kyrgyzstani-Russian chess grandmaster (born 1985)

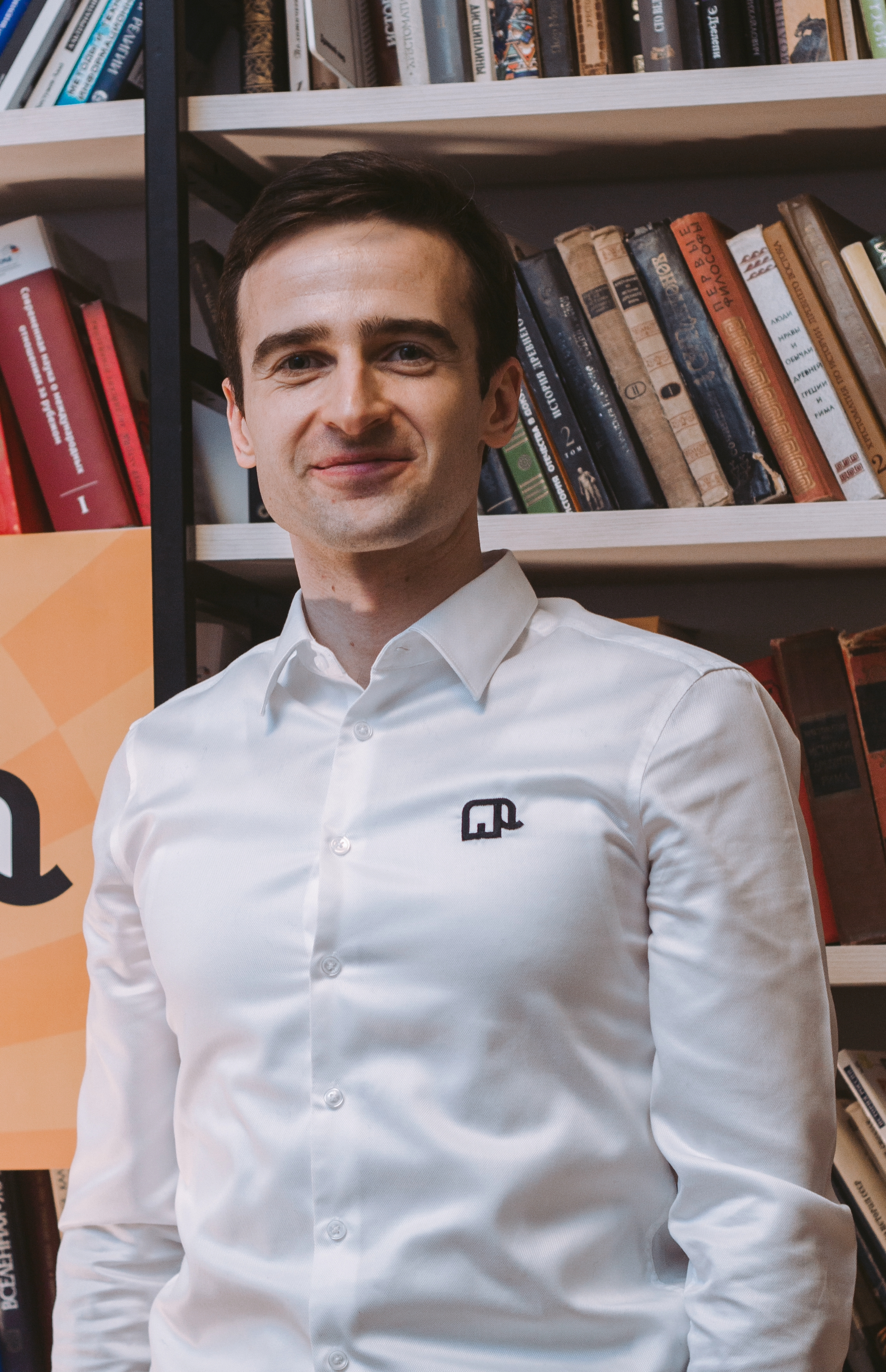
- Inarkiev in Moscow 2020

Personal information
- Born: 9 December 1985 (age 40) Khaidarkan, Osh Oblast, Kirghiz SSR, Soviet Union

Chess career
- Country: Kyrgyzstan (until 2000); Russia (since 2001)
- Title: Grandmaster (2002)
- FIDE rating: 2641 (July 2026)
- Peak rating: 2732 (September 2016)
- Ranking: No. 80 (July 2026)
- Peak ranking: No. 25 (October 2016)

Ernesto Kazbekovich Inarkiev (Russian: Эрнесто Казбекович Инаркиев; born 9 December 1985) is a Russian chess grandmaster, the first ever from Kalmykia. He was European champion in 2016.

Since July 2005, Inarkiev has continuously been among the 100 highest FIDE-rated chess players in the world.

Inarkiev was part of the Moscow team that won the Russian championship in rapid chess in 2015.

== Life and career ==
Inarkiev, who was named after Ernesto "Che" Guevara, was born in Khaidarkan, Kyrgyzstan (then part of the Soviet Union). In 1999, he won the Asian under-16 championship and the men championship of Kyrgyzstan. He played for Kyrgyzstan in two Chess Olympiads: 1998 and 2000.

In 2000, he accepted Kirsan Ilyumzhinov's offer to move to Elista with his family and started to represent the Russian Chess Federation and Kalmykia. Beginning in 2001, he was trained by Mark Dvoretsky.

Inarkiev won the Under-16 division of the European Youth Chess Championship in 2001. In 2002, Inarkiev won the Russian junior (under-20) championship.

In 2005 Inarkiev moved to Moscow, wherein 2008 graduated from economic faculty of RSSU, in finance and credit.

Inarkiev won the Higher league of the Russian championship twice (2006 and 2013). In 2006 finished third in the Superfinal of the 59th Russian Chess Championship. He is a five-time winner of the Russian team championship with the team "Tomsk-400" (2004, 2005, 2007, 2009, and 2012) and a two-time winner of European Club Cup with the team "Tomsk-400" (2005 and 2006).

Inarkiev won the 2014 Baku Open and the 3rd Sharjah Masters in 2019. Inarkiev won the Moscow Open 2015, winning 8 out of 9 matches. In 2016, Inarkiev won the European Championship in Gjakova with a performance of 2882.

In November 2017, with a rating 2767, Inarkiev became the 16th player in the world in the FIDE rapid chess rating list.

Co-organizer of the chess festival "Tower of Concord", annually organized by sports club "Adi Ahmad" in Ingushetia from 2016. The main event of the festival is the match Inarkiev played against invited stars - Boris Gelfand in 2016 and 2017, Wei Yi in 2018 and Sergey Karjakin in 2019.

From January 2017 to January 2019, Inarkiev was the President of Chess Federation of Ingushetia. During that period the project "Chess in schools" was implemented in the republic in cooperation with Russian chess federation and Timchenko Foundation.

=== 2017 incident against Magnus Carlsen ===
Inarkiev was involved in a rules controversy at the 2017 World Blitz Championship during his game against Magnus Carlsen. With both players only having seconds left on the clock, Carlsen checked Inarkiev, who then ignored the check and played an illegal move putting Carlsen in check. Carlsen moved his own king away from the attack, prompting Inarkiev to summon an arbiter to ask them to declare him the winner because Carlsen had made an illegal move. The arbiter awarded Inarkiev the victory, but the decision was quickly overturned by the chief arbiter, who ruled that Carlsen's move was not technically illegal even though it resulted in an illegal position and invited the participants to continue the game from the position in which it was stopped. Inarkiev refused to continue, leaving Carlsen as the winner; Inarkiev's subsequent appeal was dismissed.

After this game, in 2018, the rules for blitz and rapid chess were amended – now, if the arbiter sees a position where both kings are in check, the arbiter must wait for the completion of the next move, and if an illegal position remains on the board, they must call a draw. Also, warnings and penalties are currently provided for the first illegal move, and only if a player makes a second illegal move will the arbiter declare the game a win for the other player.
