= Jangy-Jer, Kadamjay =

Village in Batken Region, Kyrgyzstan

Jangy-Jer Kyrgyz: Жаңы-Жер
- Village
- Location within Kyrgyzstan
- Coordinates: 40.28439°N 71.1688°E
- Country: Kyrgyzstan
- Region: Batken Region
- District: Kadamjay District
- Rural community: Ak-Turpak

Population (2022)
  - Total: 3,542
- Time zone: UTC+6 (KGT)

Jangy-Jer (Kyrgyz: Жаңы-Жер) is a village in the Kadamjay District of Batken Region, Kyrgyzstan. It is the administrative centre of the Ak-Turpak rural community. Its population was 3,542 in 2022.

The village is listed in the 2025 state administrative-territorial classifier under SOATE code 41705258804020.

== Geography ==
Jangy-Jer lies near the Osh–Batken–Razzakov highway. The highway forms part of the ЭМ-16 road corridor.

== Population ==
The village had a resident population of 3,028 at the 2009 census, increasing to 3,542 at the 2022 census.

Historical population
Year	Pop.	±%
2009	3,028	—
2022	3,542	+17.0%
Resident population. Source: Census results.
