= Mirbek Akhmataliyev =

Kyrgyz footballer

Personal information
- Full name: Mirbek Akhmataliyevich Akhmataliyev
- Date of birth: 7 February 1994 (age 32)
- Place of birth: Orozbekov, Kyrgyzstan
- Height: 1.81 m (5 ft 11 in)
- Position: Forward

Team information
- Current team: Toktogul
- Number: 32

Youth career
- 2011–2012: Dordoi Bishkek

Senior career*
Years	Team	Apps	(Gls)
2012	Dinamo Bishkek		
2013	Nashe Pivo		
2014–2016	Alga Bishkek		
2016–2017	Dordoi Bishkek		
2017–2018	Tatvan Gençlerbirliği Spor		
2018	Kale Belediyespor		
2018	Alga Bishkek		
2019	Alay	21	(6)
2020	Alga Bishkek	12	(2)
2021	Kaganat	13	(6)
2021	Abdysh-Ata Kant	15	(13)
2022	PDRM	7	(2)
2022–2024	Abdysh-Ata Kant	41	(21)
2024	Muras United	6	(0)
2026–	Toktogul	1	(0)

International career^{‡}
2016–	Kyrgyzstan	3	(0)
- * Club domestic league appearances and goals as of 23:11, 14 March 2026 (UTC) ‡ National team caps and goals as of 19:17, 25 February 2022 (UTC)

Mirbek Akhmataliyevich Akhmataliyev (Kyrgyz: Мирбек Ахматалиев; Russian: Мирбек Ахматалиевич Ахматалиев; born 7 February 1994 in Orozbekov) is a Kyrgyz footballer who plays for Kyrgyz Premier League club Toktogul and the Kyrgyzstan national team.

== Club career ==
Akhmataliyev signed for FC Dordoi Bishkek for the 2016 season after previously impressing with the club's youth sides and as a top scorer in the league for Dinamo Bishkek and Alga Bishkek. Following the season he competed with the club in 2017 AFC Cup and scored against Benfica de Macau in the qualifying round.

The following season he transferred to Tatvan Gençlerbirliği Spor of the Turkish Regional Amateur League. For the next season he moved to Kale Belediyespor of the same league.

He split the 2021 Kyrgyz Premier League season between Kaganat and Abdysh-Ata Kant. In total he scored nineteen goals in 28 matches to win the scoring title and helping Abdysh-Ata Kant finish second in the table. Following the season he signed for PDRM of the Malaysia Premier League. During pre-season, he scored three goals in three matches including against Kedah Darul Aman, Sri Pahang, and Selegor 2. He became captain of the squad shortly after signing.

By August 2024 he was again playing in his home country. On August 15, during a Muras United training session at the Selmash stadium in Bishkek, a fight broke out among the team's players, resulting in Mirbek Akhmataliyev breaking the jaw of his teammate Evgeni Terzin. As a result, the club terminated Akhmataliyev's contract and he was also disqualified from football for 5 years by the Kyrgyzstan Football Federation's Disciplinary Committee.

== International career ==
Akhmataliyev made his senior international debut on 11 October 2016 in a friendly against Turkmenistan.

=== International career statistics ===
As of match played 11 November 2021.

Kyrgyzstan national team
Year	Apps	Goals
2016	2	0
2021	1	0
Total	3	0
