= Karool =

Karool Kyrgyz: Кароол
- Location within Kyrgyzstan
- Coordinates: 40°2′N 72°05′E
- Country: Kyrgyzstan
- Region: Batken Region
- District: Kadamjay District

Population (2021)
  - Total: 583
- Time zone: UTC+6

Karool (Kyrgyz: Кароол) is a village in Batken Region of Kyrgyzstan. It is part of the Kadamjay District. Its population was 583 in 2021.
