= Kuldu =

Kuldu Kyrgyz: Кулду
- Location within Kyrgyzstan
- Coordinates: 40°02′20″N 71°37′10″E
- Country: Kyrgyzstan
- Region: Batken Region
- District: Kadamjay District

Population (2021)
  - Total: 5,299
- Time zone: UTC+6 (KGT)

Kuldu (Kyrgyz: Кулду) is a village in Batken Region of Kyrgyzstan. Its population was 5,299 in 2021.

== Population ==
Historical population
Year	Pop.	±% p.a.
2009	5,447	—
2021	5,299	−0.23%
Note: resident population; Sources:
