= Iradan =

- Location within Kyrgyzstan
- Coordinates: 40°15′36″N 72°6′0″E
- Country: Kyrgyzstan
- Region: Batken Region
- Elevation: 947 m (3,107 ft)

Population (1999)
  - Total: 26,200
- Time zone: UTC+6

Iradan is a town in Batken Region in south-western Kyrgyzstan, on the border with Uzbekistan's Fergana Region. It is located at an altitude of close to 1,000 m and has a population of around 26,000 people.
