= Kaltak =

Kaltak Kyrgyz: Калтак
- Location within Kyrgyzstan
- Coordinates: 40°15′0″N 72°6′0″E
- Country: Kyrgyzstan
- Region: Batken Region
- District: Kadamjay District

Population (2021)
  - Total: 1,869
- Time zone: UTC+6

Kaltak (Kyrgyz: Калтак) is a village in Batken Region of Kyrgyzstan. It is part of the Kadamjay District. Its population was 1,869 in 2021. It is situated between Üch-Korgon and Kyzyl-Kyya.
