= Sovet =

Sovet is an alternative spelling of Soviet.

Sovet may also refer to:

- Sovet, Belgium, a village in the municipality of Ciney, Belgium
- Sovet, Batken, a village in Batken Region, Kyrgyzstan
- Sovet, Chüy, a village in Chüy District, Chüy Region, Kyrgyzstan
- Sovet, Ysyk-Ata, a village in Ysyk-Ata District, Chüy Region, Kyrgyzstan
