= Ayribaz =

Ayribaz Kyrgyz: Айрыбаз
- Location within Kyrgyzstan
- Coordinates: 40°14′30″N 71°54′30″E
- Country: Kyrgyzstan
- Region: Batken
- District: Kadamjay

Population (2021)
  - Total: 7,860
- Time zone: UTC+6

Ayribaz (Kyrgyz: Айрыбаз) previously known as Markaz (Kyrgyz: Марказ) is a village in Batken Region of Kyrgyzstan. It is part of the Kadamjay District. Its population was 7,860 in 2021.

== Population ==
Historical population
Year	Pop.	±% p.a.
2009	5,310	—
2021	7,860	+3.32%
Note: resident population; Sources:
