= Böjöy =

Böjöy Kyrgyz: Бөжөй
- Location within Kyrgyzstan
- Coordinates: 40°0′36″N 71°12′36″E
- Country: Kyrgyzstan
- Region: Batken
- District: Batken
- Elevation: 1,616 m (5,302 ft)

Population (2021)
  - Total: 906
- Time zone: UTC+6

Böjöy (Kyrgyz: Бөжөй) is a village in Batken Region of Kyrgyzstan. It is part of the Batken District. Nearby towns and villages include Kojo-Korum (11 km or 7 mi) and Lembur (11 km or 7 mi). Its population was 906 in 2021.
