= Limbur =

- Location within Uzbekistan
- Coordinates: 40°03′36″N 71°06′00″E
- Country: Uzbekistan
- Region: Fergana Region
- District: Sokh District
- Elevation: 1,054 m (3,458 ft)
- Time zone: UTC +5

Limbur is a village in the Fergana Region of Uzbekistan. It lies in the Sokh District, an exclave of Uzbekistan, surrounded by Kyrgyzstan. Nearby towns and villages include Sarykamysh (10 km or 6 mi) and Bejey (11 km or 7 mi).
