= Sary-Kamysh, Batken =

Sary-Kamysh Kyrgyz: Сары-Камыш
- Location in Kyrgyzstan
- Coordinates: 40°7′38″N 71°10′35″E
- Country: Kyrgyzstan
- Region: Batken Region
- District: Kadamjay District

Population (2021)
  - Total: 6
- Time zone: UTC+6 (KGT)

Sary-Kamysh (Kyrgyz: Сары-Камыш) is a village in the Kadamjay District, Batken Region of Kyrgyzstan. Its population was 6 in 2021.
