= Kyrgyz-Kyshtak =

Kyrgyz-Kyshtak Kyrgyz: Кыргыз-Кыштак
- Location within Kyrgyzstan
- Coordinates: 40°18′30″N 71°21′00″E
- Country: Kyrgyzstan
- Region: Batken
- District: Kadamjay

Population (2021)
  - Total: 5,809
- Time zone: UTC+6

Kyrgyz-Kyshtak (Kyrgyz: Кыргыз-Кыштак) is a village in Batken Region of Kyrgyzstan. It is part of the Kadamjay District. Its population was 5,809 in 2021.

== Population ==
Historical population
Year	Pop.	±% p.a.
2009	3,724	—
2021	5,809	+3.77%
Note: resident population; Sources:
