= Jangy-Ayyl =

Jangy-Ayyl Kyrgyz: Жаңы-Айыл
- Location within Kyrgyzstan
- Coordinates: 40°12′44″N 71°39′40″E
- Country: Kyrgyzstan
- Region: Batken Region
- District: Kadamjay District

Population (2025)
  - Total: 1,013
- Time zone: UTC+6

Jangy-Ayyl (Kyrgyz: Жаңы-Айыл) is a village in Kadamjay District, Batken Region in south-west Kyrgyzstan. Its population was 1,013 in 2025. The village lies just to the north of the small enclave Jangail belonged to Uzbekistan, less than 1 km^{2} in area, which is now officially merged into Kyrgyzstan.

== Population ==
Historical population
Year	Pop.	±% p.a.
2009	636	—
2015	725	+2.21%
2022	763	+0.73%
2025	1,013	+9.91%
Note: resident population; Sources:
