= Ravon, Uzbekistan =

Ravon
- Town
- Location in Uzbekistan
- Coordinates: 39°58′5″N 71°07′45″E
- Country: Uzbekistan
- Region: Fergana Region
- District: Soʻx District
- Elevation: 1,151 m (3,776 ft)

Population (2016)
  - Total: 7,800
- Time zone: UTC+5 (UZT)

Ravon (Uzbek: Равон, Ravon, Russian: Раван, romanized: Ravan) is an urban-type settlement in Fergana Region, Uzbekistan. It is the administrative center of Soʻx District. Its population is 7,800 (2016).
