= Sokh District =

Coordinates: 39.9500°N 71.1200°E

Sokh District Soʻx tumani (Uzbek) • Ноҳияи Сӯх (Tajik) • Сохский район (Russian)
- District
- Sokh District
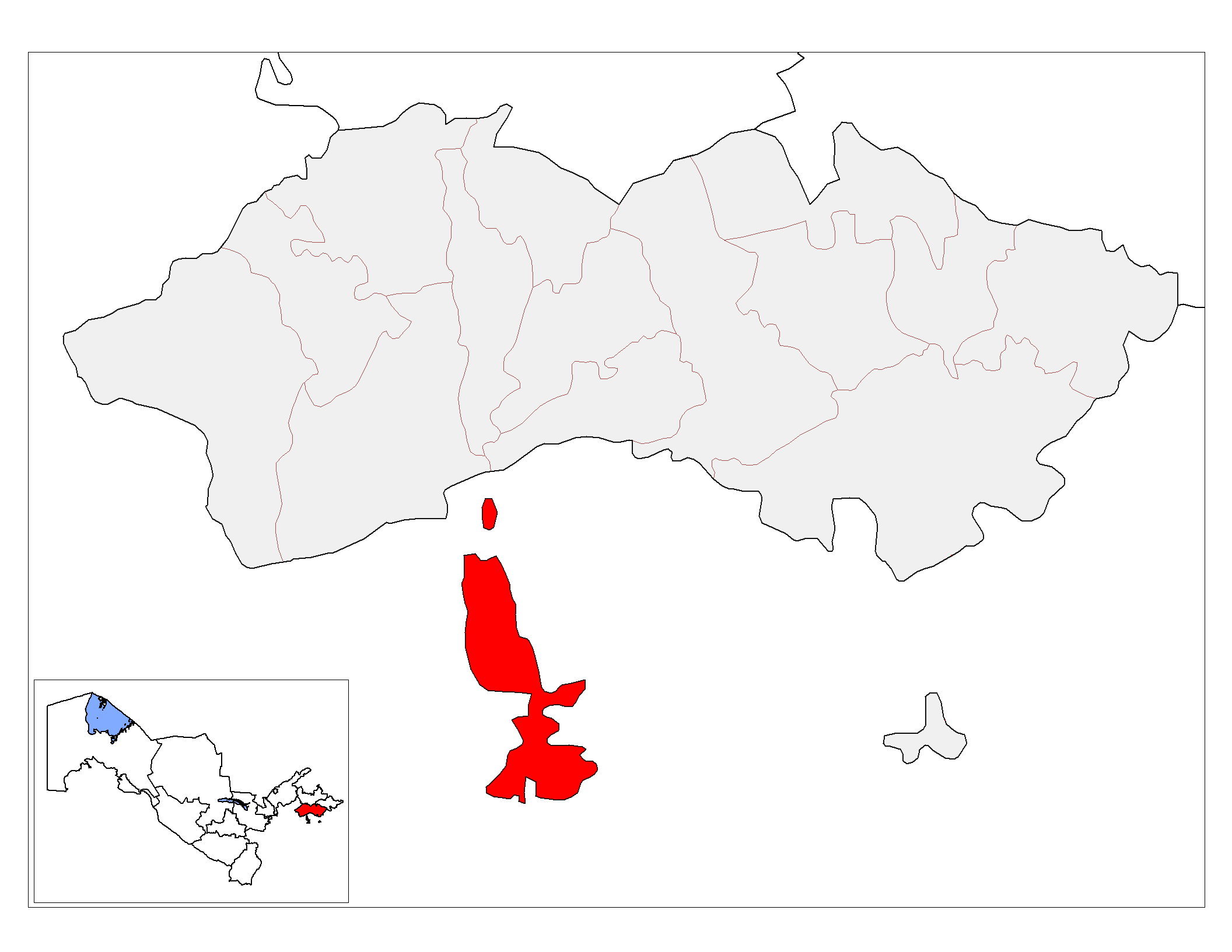
- Map showing the exclave of Sokh in red.
- Country: Uzbekistan
- Region: Fergana Region
- Capital: Ravon
- Established: 1942

Area
  - Total: 220 km^{2} (85 sq mi)

Population (2022)
  - Total: 80,600
  - Density: 370/km^{2} (950/sq mi)
- Time zone: UTC+5 (UZT)

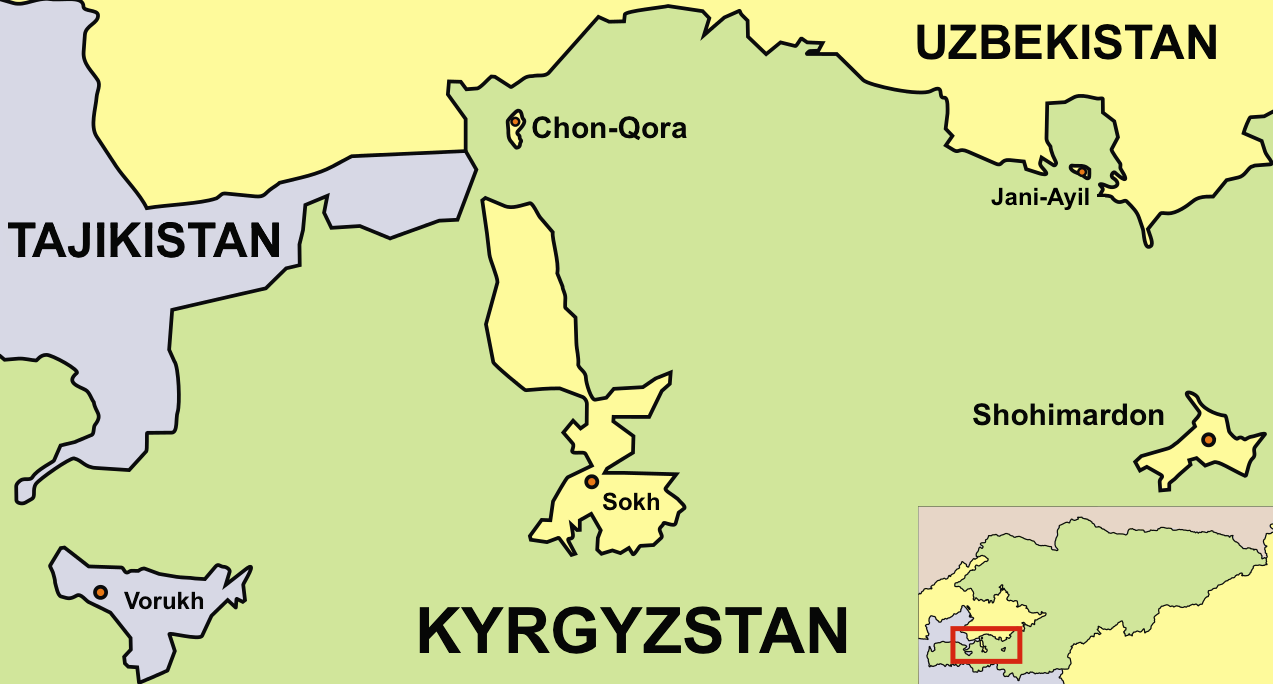
Map showing the three main exclaves in Kyrgyzstan, So'x is in the middle

Sokh District (Uzbek: Soʻx tumani, Tajik: ноҳияи Сӯх, romanized: Nohiyai Sūx, Russian: Сохский район, romanized: Sokhsky rayon) is a district in the Fergana Region of Uzbekistan, consisting of an exclave surrounded by Kyrgyzstan. Despite being part of Uzbekistan, its population is almost entirely ethnic Tajik, and the southern part of the district is closer to the border with Tajikistan than to the rest of Uzbekistan. Its capital is the town of Ravon. It has an area of 220 km^{2} (85 sq mi) and it has 80,600 inhabitants as of 2022. The district consists of seven urban-type settlements (Ravon, Qalʻa, Sarikanda, Soʻx, Tul, Hushyor, Tarovatli) and four rural communities (Sohibkor, Ravon, Soʻx, Hushyor). Another village in the district is Limbur.

== Geography ==
The territory of Sokh is entirely contained within Kyrgyzstan; the area encompasses nineteen localities with an urban population of 65.9 percent and a rural population of 34.1 percent. It is 99 percent Tajik, 0.7 percent Kyrgyz and 0.3 percent Uzbek.

The exclave's name comes from the river Sokh, 124 km (77 mi) long, which crosses the territory and waters its fertile valley. The exclave is surrounded by the Kyrgyz Batken Region. Sokh's border is 135 km (84 mi) long, with nine border posts guarded by Kyrgyzstan.

== Population ==
As of 2022, the population is 80,600. Despite being a part of Uzbek territory and being surrounded by Kyrgyzstan, its population is mostly Tajik.

== History ==
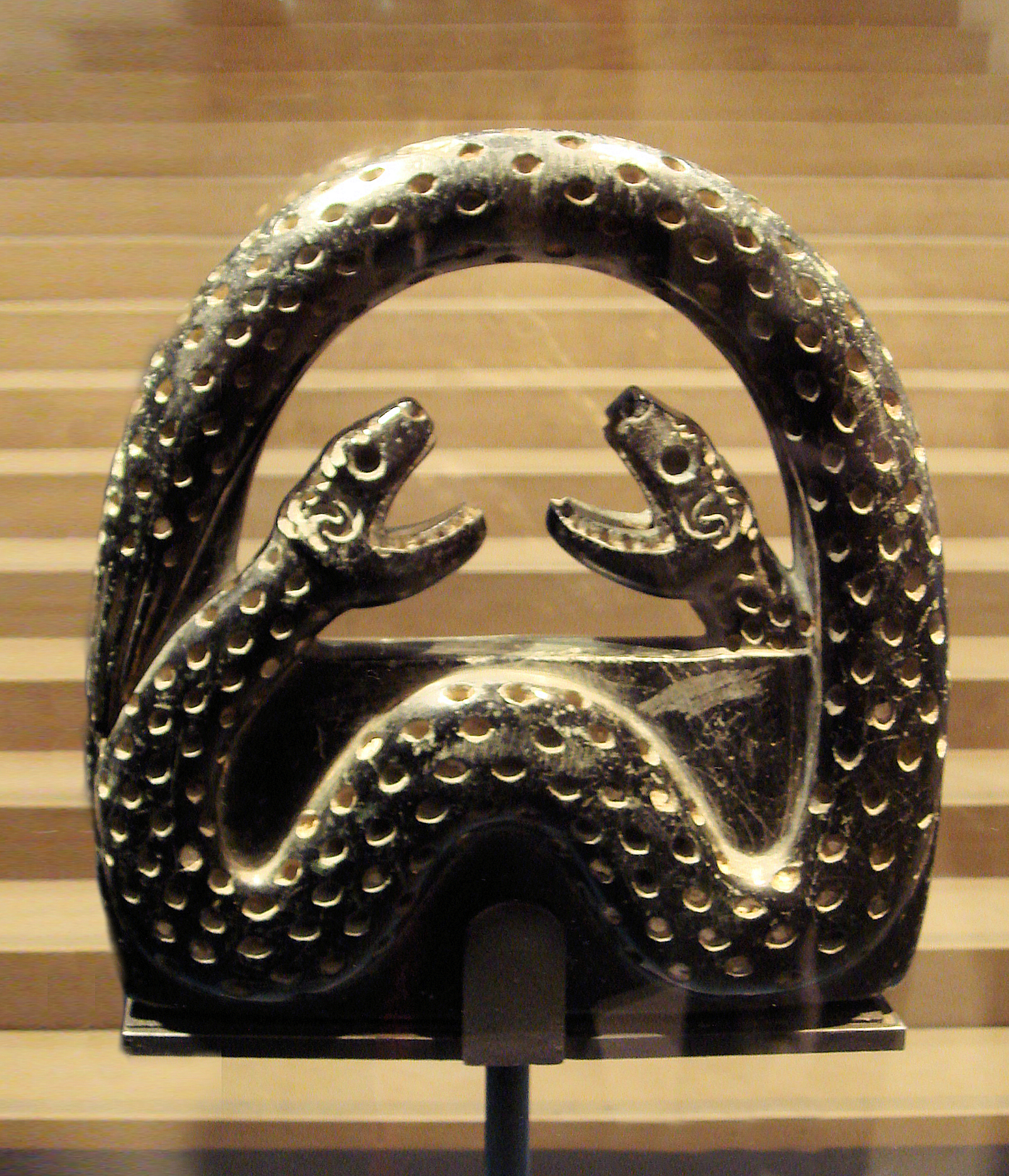
Two snakes, Sokh, Ferghana valley, 3rd millennium BCE.

Together with Kokand, Sokh was one of the centres of the Basmachi uprising from 1918 to 1924. At that time, Sokh was still directly connected with Uzbekistan.

Sokh was created in 1955. Local legend holds that “the territory was lost by a Kyrgyz Communist Party official in a card game with his Uzbek counterpart.” Others say it made sense to assign the area to Uzbekistan because the roads running along the Sokh river connected to Uzbekistan to the north rather than going through the rugged Kyrgyz territory to the east and west of the area in question.

In 1999, Uzbekistan claimed that militants from the Islamic Movement of Uzbekistan (IMU) were using Sokh as their base to attack Uzbekistan and Kyrgyzstan. Earlier that year, Tashkent had been rocked by a series of car bombings attributed to the IMU. Uzbekistan began mining the borders around Sokh, angering the Kyrgyz who claim Uzbekistan placed mines on its territory.

=== Transfer of Chongara to Kyrgyzstan ===
Until June 2026, the district comprised two isolated parts, the larger of which, Sokh, is the only one remaining under Uzbek rule today. Further north, the much smaller and lesser-populated exclave of Chongara (Чоң-Гара, sometimes written as Chon Qora and known as Northern Sokh or Lower Sokh) was transferred to Kyrgyzstan, in exchange for land of equal size in border areas being given to Uzbekistan. According to the government of Kyrgyzstan, the territory's inhabitants will receive Kyrgyz citizenship. The same territory also included the village of Kalacha (Калача), located 1 km upstream when following the river Sokh.

== Economy ==
The economy of Sokh is mainly based on agriculture (potatoes and fruits). The fields are supplied by the river Sokh so that agriculture is only possible in the valley plain. The Sokh valley forms a river oasis in the surrounding, barren grassland. The seasonal migration of the male labour force to Russia is also important. The exclave contains twenty-eight schools, two colleges, three clinics, twelve dispensaries and ten village health centres.

== In popular culture ==
British travel YouTuber Bald and Bankrupt featured Sokh District in one of his videos, documenting his visit to the exclave and interactions with local residents. The video has received over 4.1 million views.

== See also ==
- Sokh (river)
- Sokh fortress
- Shohimardon, an Uzbekistan exclave in Kyrgyzstan
- Sarvan, a Tajikistan exclave in Uzbekistan
- Vorukh, a Tajikistan exclave in Kyrgyzstan
- Batken Region enclaves and exclaves
