= Kadamjay District =

Coordinates: 40°07′N 71°44′E

Kadamjay Кадамжай району
- District
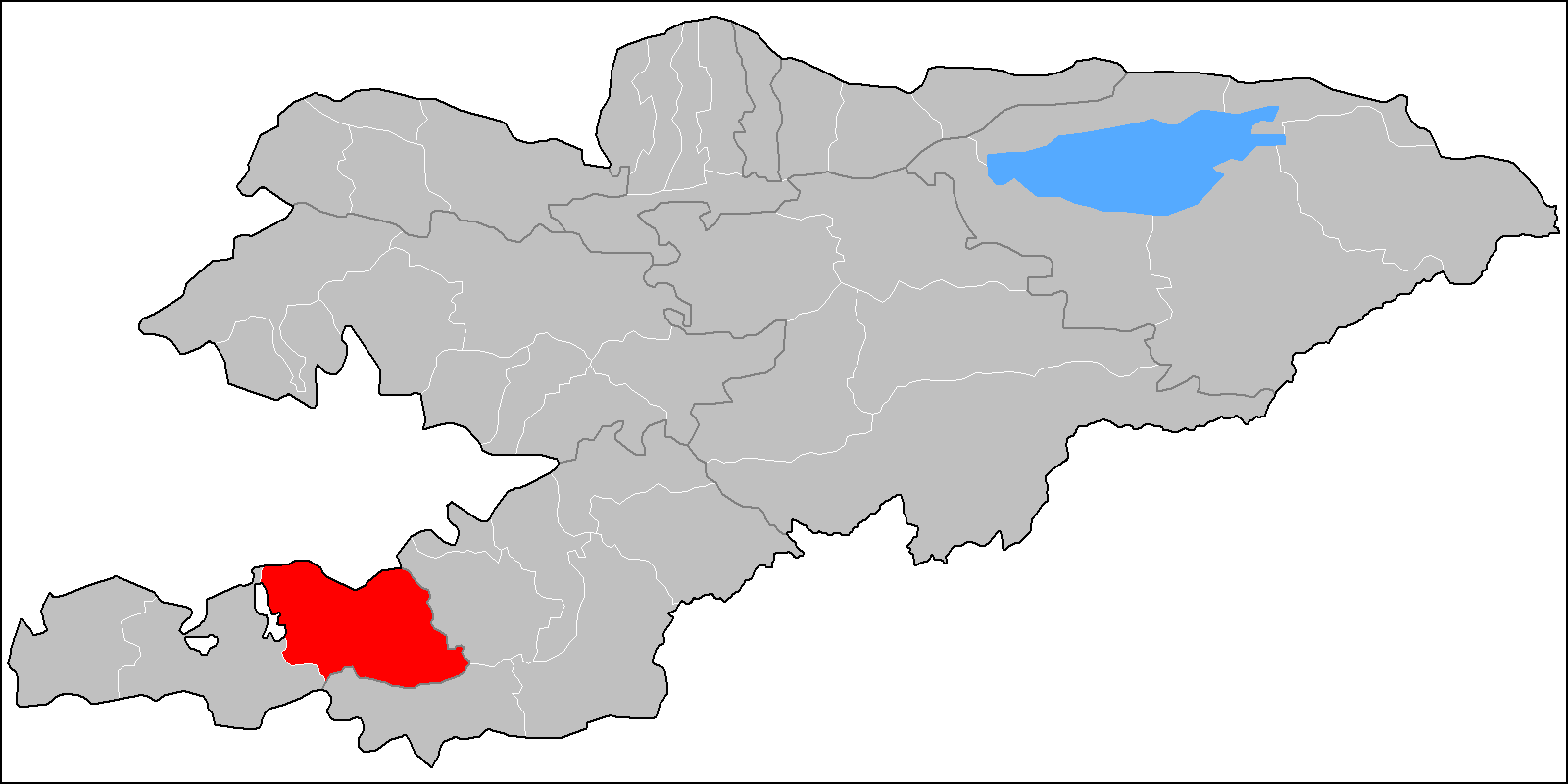
- Country: Kyrgyzstan
- Region: Batken Region
- Seat: Kadamjay

Area
  - Total: 6,146 km^{2} (2,373 sq mi)

Population (2021)
  - Total: 201,457
  - Density: 32.78/km^{2} (84.90/sq mi)
- Time zone: UTC+6

Kadamjay District (Kyrgyz: Кадамжай району; Russian: Кадамжайский район) is a district in Batken Region, in south-western Kyrgyzstan. The administrative seat lies at Kadamjay. The district area is 6,146 square kilometres (2,373 sq mi), and its resident population was 201,457 in 2021. The largest town of the district, Kadamjay, is located between the cities of Aydarken (Khaidarkan) and Kyzyl-Kyya.

The district is thought to have the second largest mercury-antimony deposit in the world. Kadamjay Antimony Factory is one of the biggest factories in Kyrgyzstan. Khaidarkan Mercury Plant, built in 1942, was reported, as of 2005, to produce 300 to 600 metric tons of mercury per year.

The river Shohimardonsoy (Kyrgyz: Шаймерден, romanized: Shaymerden) passes through the town Kadamjay. Other rivers in the district are the Isfayramsay and the Sokh.

== Population ==
Historical population
Year	Pop.	±% p.a.
1970	72,171	—
1979	88,207	+2.25%
1989	112,134	+2.43%
1999	140,487	+2.28%
2009	157,597	+1.16%
2021	201,457	+2.07%
2022	201,293	−0.08%
Note: resident population. Sources:

== Rural communities and villages ==
According to the 2025 state administrative-territorial classifier, Kadamjay District comprises two cities, Aydarken and Kadamjay, and 113 villages grouped into eight rural communities (ayyl aymagy).

The rural communities and their constituent villages are:

1. Ak-Turpak (seat: Jangy-Jer; includes Ak-Turpak, Kalacha, Kara-Tumshuk, Kyzyl-Korgon, Ötükchü, Sary-Kamysh, Tokoy, Chogorok, Chong-Kara, Jash-Tilek, Örükzar, Ming-Chynar, Kelechek and Jetigen)
2. Moldo Niyaz (seat: Alga; includes Adyr, Böksö, Myrgyljek, Shybran, Chungkur-Kyshtak, Jangy-Chek, Kyrgyz-Kyshtak, Kojo-Korum, Kaytpas, Bürgöndü OPKh, Bürgöndü PMK, Ak-Tilek, Umay-Ene and Sovetsky)
3. Birlik (seat: Ormosh; includes Bel, Jal, Jangy-Korgon, Molo, Sur, Syrt, Teskey, Chechme, Eshme, Jangy-Syrt and Yntymak)
4. Absamat Masaliev (seat: Kara-Döbö; includes Olagysh, Kakyr, Kojo, Kon, Alysh, Tash-Korgon, Leskhoz, Kakyr, Kalacha and Raz'ezd)
5. Maydan (seat: Ayribaz; includes Arpa-Say, Dostuk, Kök-Talaa, Mayak, Pyldyrak, Kara-Jygach, Austan, Kara-Kyshtak, Karool, Kerege-Tash, Maydan, Pum, Kara-Döbö, Isfayram, Sary-Altyn, Bak, Akimbek and Jangy-Abad)
6. Orozbekov (seat: Uchkun; includes Orozbekov, Kuldu, Kosh-Döbö, Kuduk, Öndürüsh, Sary-Talaa, Kyzyl-Bulak, Ak-Kyya, Gayrat, Jalgyz-Bulak, Kara-Oot, Kara-Shoro, Kesken-Tash, Kötörmö, Tamasha and Langar)
7. Üch-Korgon (seat: Üch-Korgon; includes Chauvay, Tegirmech, Kaltak, Sulaymanabad, Sukhana, Chauvay, Boz, Kambar-Abad and Tajik-Kyshtak)
8. Iskhak-Polotkhan (seat: Jenish; includes Baymaala, Güldürömö, Jangy-Ayyl, Joshuk, Irilesh, Kök-Tal, Kurulush, Ak-Orgo, Tash-Döbö, Yntymak, Chekelik, Shady and Kelechek)

The classifier lists two distinct villages named Kakyr in the Absamat Masaliev rural community and two named Chauvay in the Üch-Korgon rural community.

Kichi-Aydarken and Shak-Shak have been incorporated into Aydarken. Tash-Kyya, Pülgön, Chal-Tash, Jangy-Jer and Jiydelik have been incorporated into Kadamjay and are no longer listed as separate villages.

Kyzyl-Kyya is a separate city of regional significance and is not part of Kadamjay District. Karavan, Ak-Bulak and Jin-Jigen have been incorporated into that city.
