= Shohimardon =

Shohimardon Шоҳимардон
- Rural community
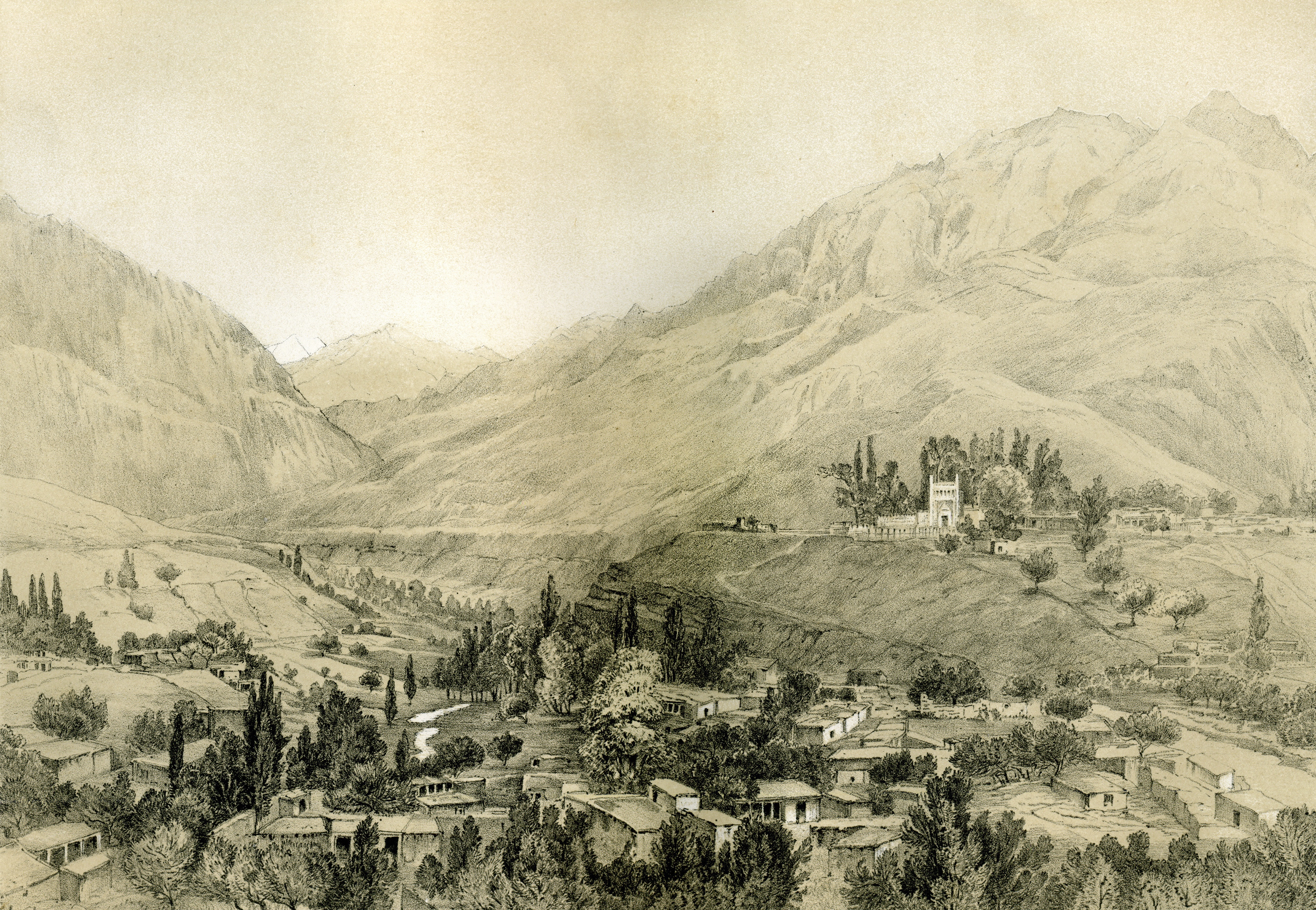
- Shohimardon in 1871
- Nickname: The Switzerland of Ferghana valley
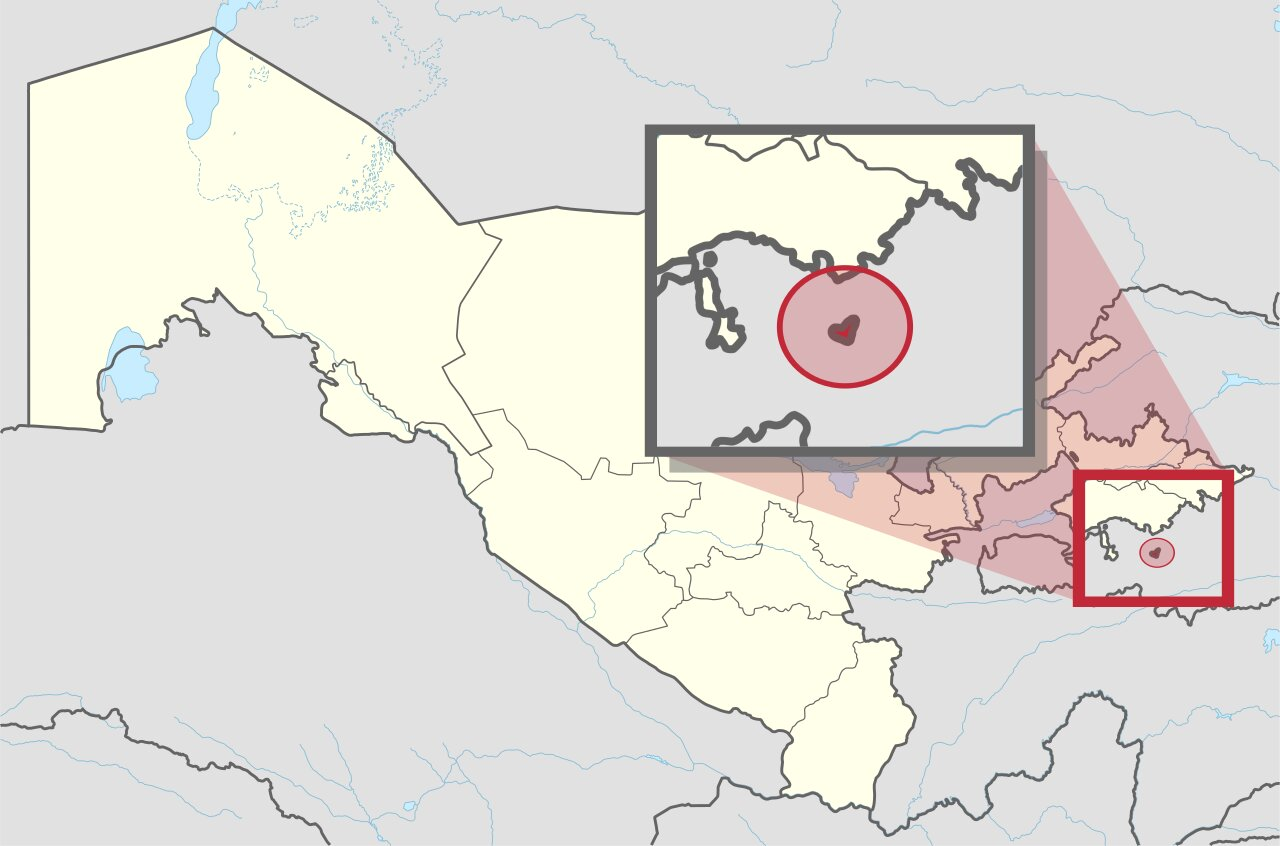
- Shohimardon highlighted on the map of Uzbekistan
- Interactive map of Shohimardon
- Location within Uzbekistan Location within Asia
- Coordinates: 39°59′N 71°48′E
- Country: Uzbekistan
- Region: Fergana Region
- District: Fergana District
- Villages: Shohimardon, Yardan

Area
  - Total: 90 km^{2} (35 sq mi)
- Highest elevation (Peak Almalik): 2,841 m (9,321 ft)
- Lowest elevation (Shohimardonsoy valley): 1,290 m (4,230 ft)

Population (2002)
  - Total: 10,100
  - Density: 110/km^{2} (290/sq mi)
- Demonym: Shohimardonian
- Time zone: UTC+5
- Uzbekistan Postal code: 150418
- Area code: +998
- ISO 3166 code: UZ

Shohimardon (also Shakhimardan, Uzbek: Shohimardon / Шоҳимардон, Russian: Шахимардан, romanized: Shakhimardan) is a village and a subdivision (rural community) of Fergana District, Fergana Region in eastern Uzbekistan. It is an exclave of Uzbekistan, surrounded by Kyrgyzstan, in a valley in the Pamir-Alay mountains. The name means ‘King of Men’ in Persian. The river Shohimardonsoy flows through the exclave. There are two villages: Shohimardon and Yordon.

Shohimardon is a popular resort with several sanatoria, and an active place of pilgrimage. According to one folk legend, the Caliph Ali was buried in Shohimardon.

Shakhimardan City Resort is situated at 1,975 m (6,480 ft) above sea level, 155 km (96 mi) from Ferghana, in the picturesque mountainous district. The Kuliqurbon or Blue Lake is seven kilometres (4.3 mi) southeast of Shakhimardan. It was formed in 1766 after a series of extreme earthquakes. The lake is located at an altitude of 1,724 metres (5,656 ft). It's 170 m (560 ft) long, 60 m (200 ft) tall, 5–10 m (16–33 ft) deep. The cableway continues to the lake for two kilometres (1.2 mi).

The Uzbek poet Hamza Hakimzade Niyazi lived and worked in Shohimardon until he was stoned to death there in 1929.

== Geography ==
Shohimardon is an exclave of Uzbekistan, surrounded by Kyrgyzstan's Batken region, Kadamjay district, in Eastern Central Asia. Its mountainous topography, with no substantial naturally flat ground, is part of the Alay mountains range.

It is one of 4 exclaves of Uzbekistan located in Kyrgyzstan, including Sokh, Chon-Qora (Qalacha), and Jangail, the second largest with an area of 90 km^{2} (35 sq mi) after Sokh 325 km^{2} (125 sq mi).

=== Mountains and rivers ===
It is located in a valley on the northern slopes of the Ala mountains at an altitude of about 1550 meters. Highest points of the exclave are summits Almalik (2,841 m (9,321 ft)), Chivirgan (2,465 m (8,087 ft)), and Qizil-Gaza (2,568 m (8,425 ft)). On the western side of Shohimardon village located Kozdibel mountains.

Several rivers flow through the exclave, the largest being Koksu, Oqsu, and the Shohimardonsoy. After Koksu joins with Oqsu near to the village park, river Shohimardonsoy starts, which flows down to Margilan. The main source of rivers are glaciers in Kyrgyzstan. Oqsu's flow starts from glaciers Northern Alauddin, Archa-Bashy, and Western Karakazyk. At the beginning river called Alauddin, after Alauddin comes together with Archa-Bashy stream it gets the name Oqsu. The stream Dugoba joins it in Yordon village.

=== Climate ===
Lowest temperature in January −23.0 °C (−9.4 °F). Highest temperature in July +42.0 °C (107.6 °F). The average amount of moisture falling as rain and snow is 350–400 mm (14–16 in). The average temperature in July is 22 °C (72 °F), in January from −3 °C (27 °F) to +3 °C (37 °F).

=== Flora and fauna ===
In the water of Shohimardonsoy lives Triplophysa ferganaensis, an endemic fish species to the Shohimardonsoy river. Mountains are covered with wood. Most parts of the flat land is in use for agriculture.

== Demographics ==
The population of the exclave in 1993 was about 5,100 people, of which 91% were Uzbeks, and 9% were Kyrgyz. Today around 10,000 people live in the exclave, mostly ethnic Uzbeks. Statistical information about the population of Shohimardon (and Yardan) at the end of 19th century and at the first two decades of 20th century:

Shohimardon-Yardan	1890	1909	1917	1925	1926
Population	461	1818	1151	721	424
Ethnicity	Tajiks	Sarts	Uzbeks	Uzbeks	Uzbeks

=== Education ===
One preschool establishment and one public school in Shohimardon town and one preschool establishment and one public school in Yordon village are all public educational establishments in the subdivision. In addition to public education, private tutoring courses in language training, and preparing for university exams are available.

=== Health ===
There are two hospitals in the subdivision. The Uzbek government continuously subsidizes most educational and health services in order to maintain a reasonable quality of life in the isolated region.

=== Religion ===
Sunni Islam of the Hanafi school is the main religion in all villages of the exclave. There is one mosque in use.

Hamza Hakimzade Niyazi was stoned to death in the town of Shohimardon, by Islamic fundamentalists on the accusation of anti-religious activities.

== Transport ==
Shohimardon is connected to mainland Uzbekistan via the highway Ferghana-Shohimardon 4R-144. From Shohimardon town center local road R-144a leads to Qurbonkul (Blue lake) and R-144b to Dugoba mount camp.

There are no public airports in Shohimardon. Most tourists from abroad or other parts of Uzbekistan who arrive by air land at Ferghana International airport, then make the transfer by car. It is proposed to build a small airport for light aircraft to develop tourism in the subdivision and directly connect it with Uzbekistan without crossing Kyrgyzstan's border, as it was built in another isolated exclave - Sokh.

Today there is no railway in Shohimardon. The closest railway station is located in Ferghana city.

Two rivers and several streams flow through Shohimardon, but there is no major water transport, and no port or harbour.

=== Public transport ===
Bus service on the route "Fergana - Shohimardon" was stopped in August 2013. From April 25, 2017 the service in this direction has been restarted. There are two Isuzu buses on the route and it is served by "Fergana Golden Valley Navkari" LLC. Also there is cableway to Qurbonkul for 2 kilometers, mainly located in Kyrgyzstan territory.

== Economy ==
=== Agriculture ===
Because of mountainous territory and lower average temperatures compared to mainland Uzbekistan, agriculture in Shohimardon is tough and not suitable for most agriculture plants like wheat or cotton that are popular in Uzbekistan and Kyrgyzstan's flat lands.

Apple, apricot and peach tree gardens are common in farmlands.

Livestock, dairy products, meat, vegetable production are enough for only internal consumption and satisfies only domestic demand.

=== Tourism ===
During the Soviet era Shohimardon was one of the main travel destinations of Fergana valley's people. After the independence of former Soviet Republics, border issues between Uzbekistan and Kyrgyzstan significantly decreased the flow of tourists into Shohimardon. Today, most of the camps, tourist bases and sanatoriums are abandoned, although local people are opening new guest houses to attract more tourists.

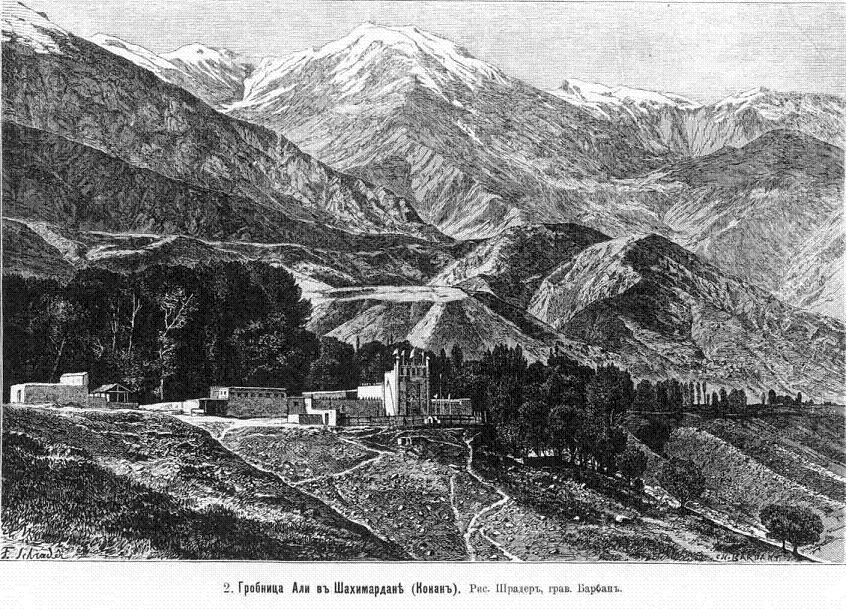
The Shrine of Ali at Shahimardan

There is one museum in Shohimardon, located in Shohimardon town park, at the crossing of Koksu and Oqsu rivers. The museum is named after the Uzbek author and scholar Hamza Hakimzade Niyazi. It was opened in 1989 by UNESCO for the 100th anniversary of Niyazi. The collection of the museum consists of lifetime stories and books of Niyazi and materials regarding to Shohimardon's history. The museum's mission is to promote the culture, history, and nature of the little exclave Shohimardon and its people.

Shohimardon is developing as the destination of pilgrimage tourism as well as ecotourism. It is home for three famous figures of history, and two of them are religious characters that Central Asian people respect a lot. There are three tombs in the shrine complex:

- Hazrat Ali's tomb
- Shahi Talib (4th generation of Hazret Ali)'s tomb
- Hamza Hakimzade Niyazi's tomb

The tourist season is from June to September. The season creates jobs for hundreds of locals. Seasonal restaurants, hotels, stores, souvenir shops open to service tourists.

Medical tourism is another prospect for Shohimardon for its fresh air, clean nature and water.

=== Labour migration ===
A high rate of unemployment in the exclave's villages results in fleeing to mainland Uzbekistan or foreign countries. Most young men travel to Russia for labour immigration. Fergana is the closest location inside of Uzbekistan.

=== Energy ===
Shohimardon is rich in hydroelectric energy resources. Rivers that flow through high mountains have great potential to build small hydroelectric power stations.

Uzbekhydroenergo and the Hydro4U consortium received a €1 million buyout for the purchase of equipment for a new hydroelectric power station. The parties signed the agreement on June 21, 2022, at the annual meeting of the participants of the Hydro4U small power plant construction project. The projected small hydroelectric power station has capacity of 2.2 MW near the village of Shakhimardan.

The power plant, after launching in 2023, will annually generate 12.8 million kWh of electricity. The project to supply 2,100 households with a population of 7,000 also includes additional capacity for production.

The implementation of the project is estimated at 2 million euros. Of these, half will be allocated by the EU in the form of a grant for the purchase of technological equipment. Another 12 billion soums came from the Uzbek side.

Uzbekhydroenergo has also negotiated a micro hydropower stand with the Austrian company Global Hydro. It is noted that the installation of block-modular systems can reduce construction costs by about 500 thousand euros.

== Culture ==
The culture of Shohimardon is the part of Uzbek traditional customs in Ferghana valley. People of Shohimardon celebrates traditional holidays as same as in Uzbekistan, including Nowruz, Islamic holidays, Independence Day of Uzbekistan and New Year's Day.

The beautiful nature of Shohimardon attracts painters from different locations, mainly from former Soviet republics. That's why it is easy to see paintings of Shohimardon among the artworks of Uzbekistan and Central Asia's most famous painters.

Shohimardon is famous among singers and poets of Uzbekistan too. Several songs has created regarding to the mountains and people of Shohimardon. Poets like National poet of Uzbekistan Muhammad Yusuf made Shohimardon even more famous around country by poems.

== See also ==
- Sokh, another Uzbekistan exclave in Kyrgyzstan
- Sarvan, a Tajikistan exclave in Uzbekistan
- Vorukh, a Tajikistan exclave in Kyrgyzstan
- Batken Region enclaves and exclaves
