= Alga, Kadamjay =

Alga Kyrgyz: Алга
- Location within Kyrgyzstan
- Coordinates: 40°14′10″N 71°30′00″E
- Country: Kyrgyzstan
- Region: Batken Region
- District: Kadamjay District
- Elevation: 752 m (2,467 ft)

Population (2021)
  - Total: 4,362
- Time zone: UTC+6

Alga (Kyrgyz: Алга) is a village in Batken Region of Kyrgyzstan. It is part of the Kadamjay District. Its population was 4,362 in 2021.
