= Shohimardonsoy =

River in Kyrgyzstan and Uzbekistan

Shohimardonsoy Shaimerden
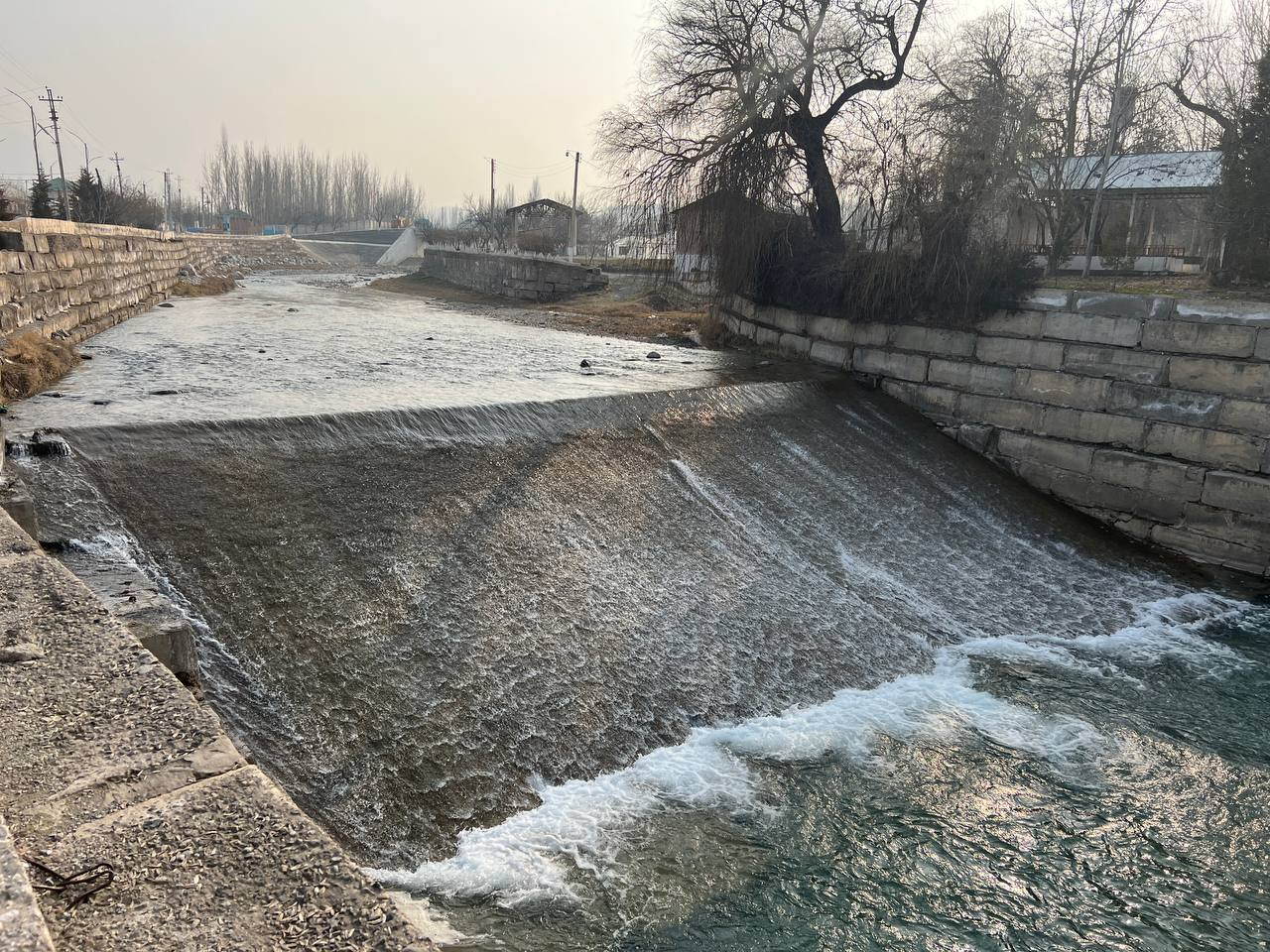

- Location within Uzbekistan

Location
- Country: Kyrgyzstan, Uzbekistan

Physical characteristics
- Source: Alay Range
- Mouth: Great Fergana Canal
  - coordinates: 40°29′18″N 71°37′00″E
- Length: 112 km (70 mi)
- Basin size: 1,467 km^{2} (566 sq mi)
- Discharge
  - average: 10.1 m^{3}/s (360 cu ft/s)

Basin features
- Progression: Great Fergana Canal→ Syr Darya→ North Aral Sea

The Shohimardonsoy (Uzbek pronunciation: [ˌʃɒhɪ̆ˌmaɾdɒnˈsɒj]), also known as the Shaimerden (Kyrgyz: Шаймерден, IPA: [ɕaɪmeɾdén]), is a river in Kyrgyzstan and Uzbekistan. It is formed at the confluence of the rivers Aksuu and Köksuu, that run from the Alay Range, near the village Shohimardon. Its lower course, between Vodil and the city Fergana, is known as Margʻilonsoy. It discharges into the Great Fergana Canal near Margilan. The river is 112 km (70 mi) long, and the watershed covers 1,467 km^{2} (566 sq mi). The main settlements along the river Shohimardonsoy are the cities Margilan, Fergana and Kadamjay, and the town Vodil. Its annual average flow rate is 10.1 m^{3}/s (360 cu ft/s).
