= Kadamjay =

Kadamjay Kyrgyz: Кадамжай
- Location within Kyrgyzstan
- Coordinates: 40°7′36″N 71°43′25″E
- Country: Kyrgyzstan
- Region: Batken Region
- District: Kadamjay District
- Elevation: 1,030 m (3,380 ft)

Population (2021)
  - Total: 14,049
- Time zone: UTC+6

Kadamjay (Kyrgyz: Кадамжай; Russian: Кадамжай, earlier also Кадамджай) is a city located in Kadamjay District of Batken Region of Kyrgyzstan. Its population was 14,049 in 2021. It is the administrative seat of Kadamjay District. Kadamjay is located between the towns of Aydarken (Khaidarkan) (to the west) and Kyzyl-Kyya (to the east), and north of the Uzbek exclave Shohimardon. The river Shohimardonsoy (Kyrgyz: Shaymerden) passes through Kadamjay.

From 1937 until 2006, the town was officially known as "Frunze". The village adjacent to it from the north, now Pülgön, was called "Frunzenskoye". In 2012, when Kadamjay was elevated to city status, it absorbed the villages Pülgön, Tash-Kyya and Chal-Tash.

Kadamjay district is thought to have the second largest mercury-antimony deposit in the world. Kadamjay Antimony Factory is one of the biggest factories in Kyrgyzstan; it is the main employer in the city. Aydarken Mercury Plant, built in 1942, was reported, as of 2005, to produce 300 to 600 metric tons of mercury per year.

"Metallurg Kadamjay" is the main football club, which was the 1997 champion in Kyrgyzstan. Kyrgyz-Turkish Kadamjay Semetei High School, Kyrgyz High School, 40-years (40-лет) and Babajan Aitmatov are the main schools of Kadamjay.

== Population ==
Historical population
Year	Pop.	±% p.a.
1970	6,518	—
1979	7,038	+0.86%
1989	7,749	+0.97%
1999	8,890	+1.38%
2009	6,732	−2.74%
2021	14,049	+6.32%
Note: resident population; Sources:
