= Aydarken =

Aydarken Kyrgyz: Айдаркең
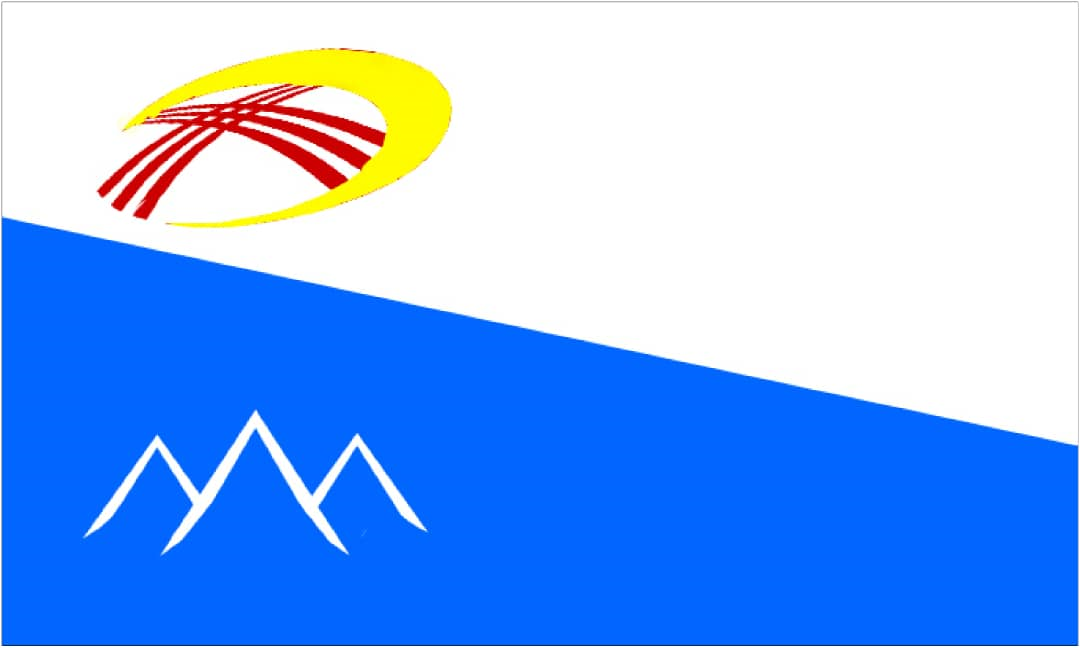
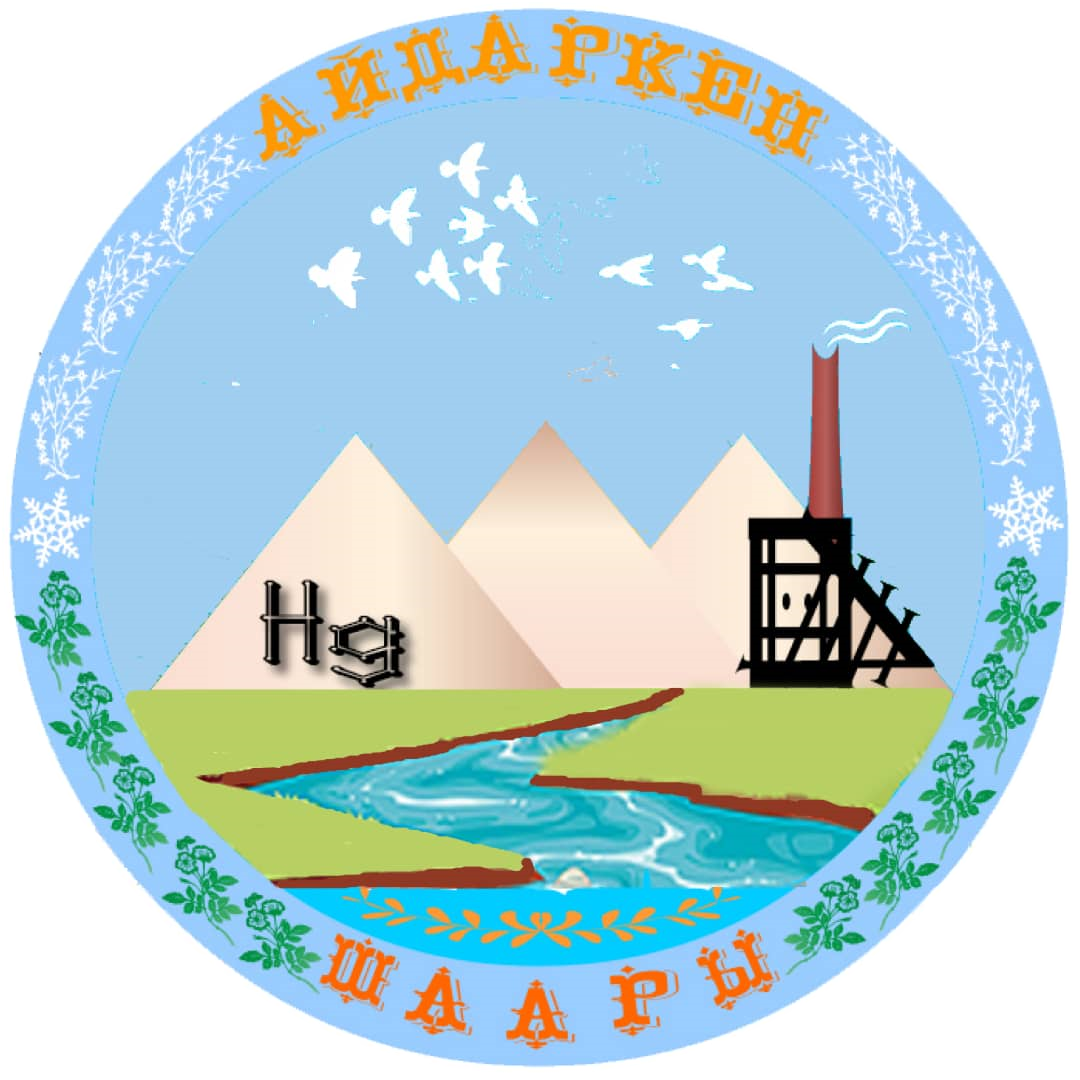
- Flag Coat of arms

- Location within Kyrgyzstan
- Coordinates: 39°56′24″N 71°19′48″E
- Country: Kyrgyzstan
- Region: Batken
- District: Kadamjay
- Founded: 1941
- Elevation: 2,000 m (6,600 ft)

Population (2021)
  - Total: 12,031

Aydarken (Kyrgyz: Айдаркен, romanized: Aydarken; Russian: Хайдаркен, romanized: Khaydarken, or more recently Айдаркен) is a city in the Batken Region of Kyrgyzstan. It is part of the Kadamjay District. The population of Aydarken amounted to 12,031 in 2021. Aydarken is situated at about 2,000 m elevation, on the northern slopes of the Alay Range.

== Population ==
Historical population
Year	Pop.	±% p.a.
1970	10,385	—
1979	11,002	+0.64%
1989	11,115	+0.10%
1999	9,148	−1.93%
2009	10,331	+1.22%
2021	12,031	+1.28%
Note: resident population; Sources:

== Aydarken Mercury Plant (KMP) ==
The Aydarken Mercury Plant (KMP) was the third largest producer of primary mercury in 2005. The ore reserves (which also contain antimony) exploited are located in or near Aydarken. The Minamata Convention on Mercury includes provisions which will eliminate primary mercury mining.

== Gallery ==
=== Unusual minerals of Aydarken ===
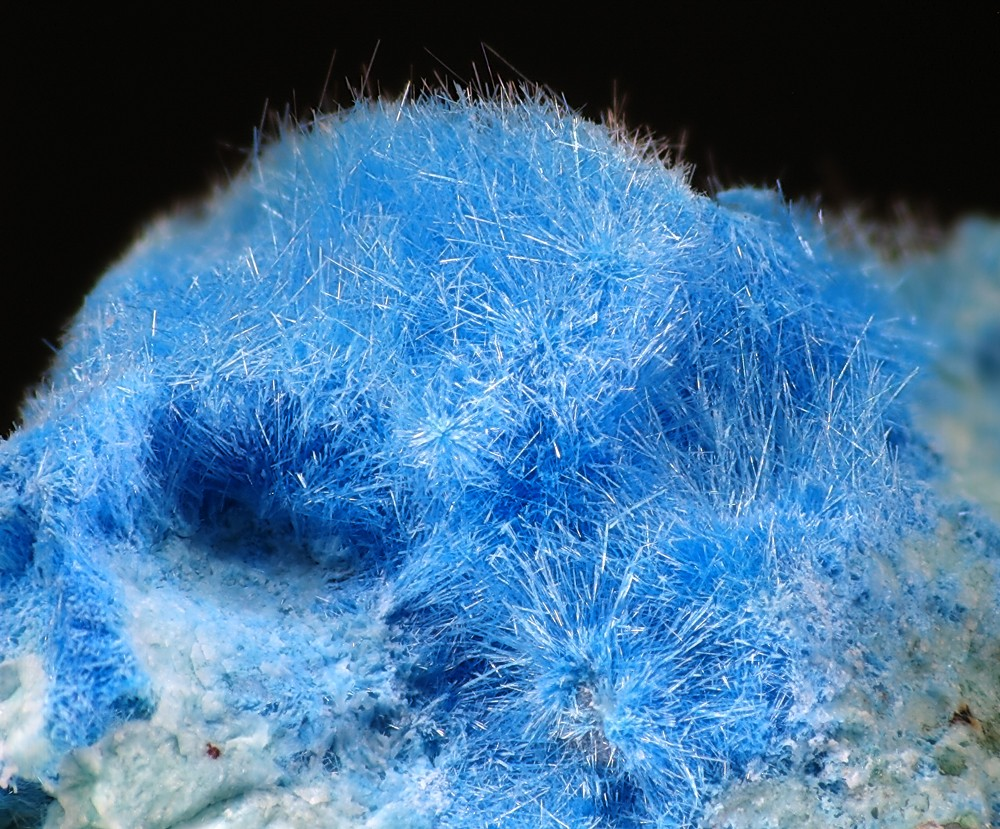
Blue fur-like mass of acicular crystals of the Copper-Aluminium mineral Khaidarkanite (Cyanotrichite group), named for type locality Khaidarkan (a.k.a. Aydarken)

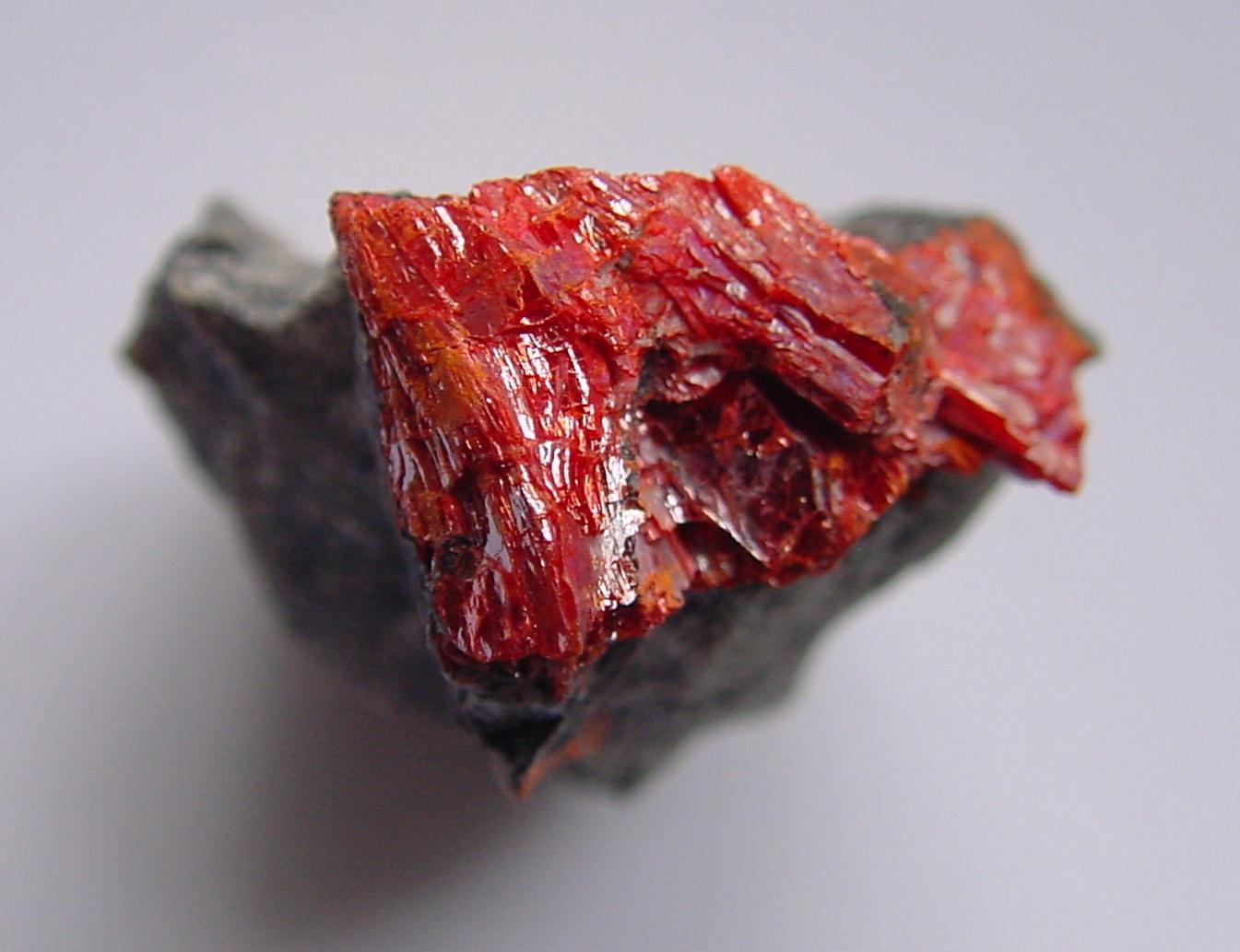
Getchellite: double sulphide of Arsenic and Antimony: mass of scarlet crystalline material of resinous lustre on grey matrix

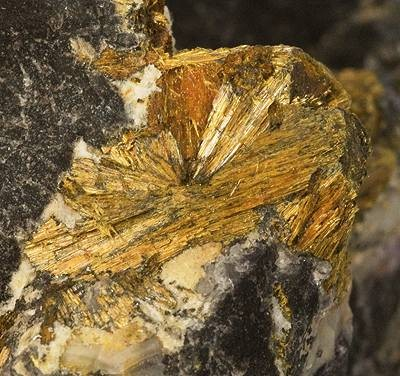
Wakabayashilite: Arsenosulphide of Arsenic and Antimony: expanse of radiating, acicular, golden crystals

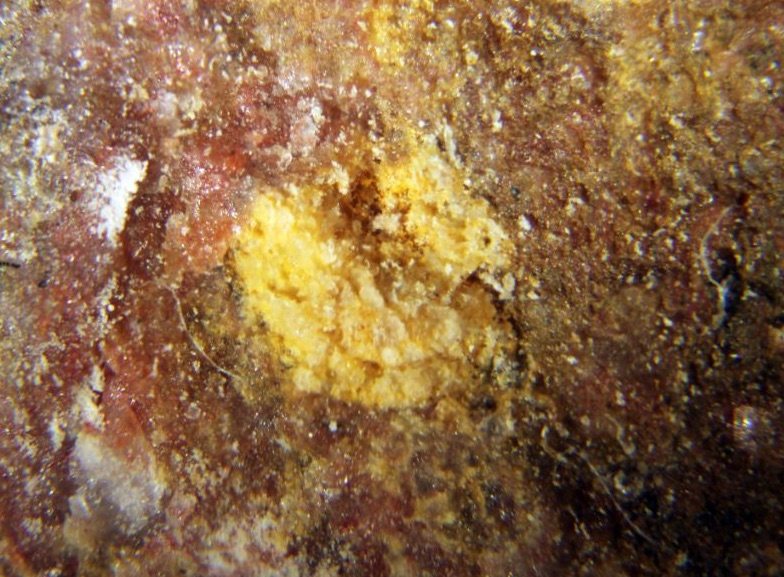
Chursinite: an extremely rare arsenate of mercury: yellow microcrystals on matrix

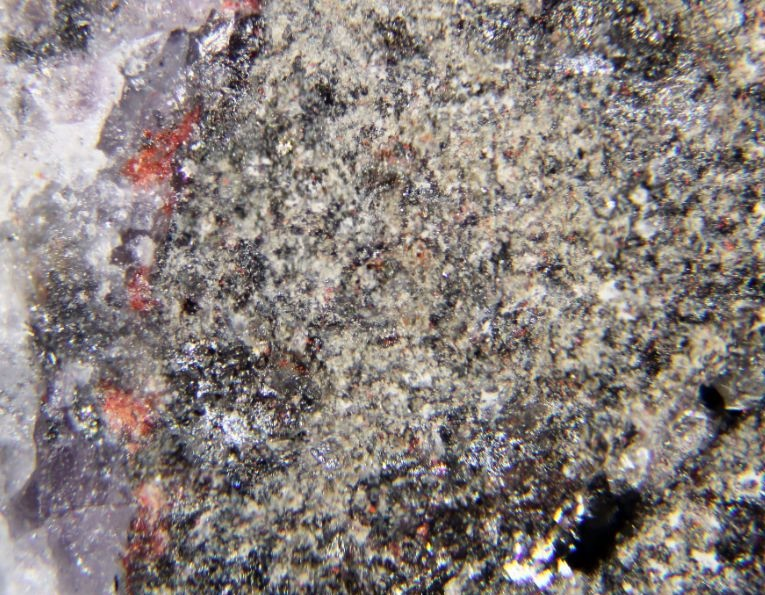
Kuznetsovite: another rare arsenate of mercury: expanse of beige crystals

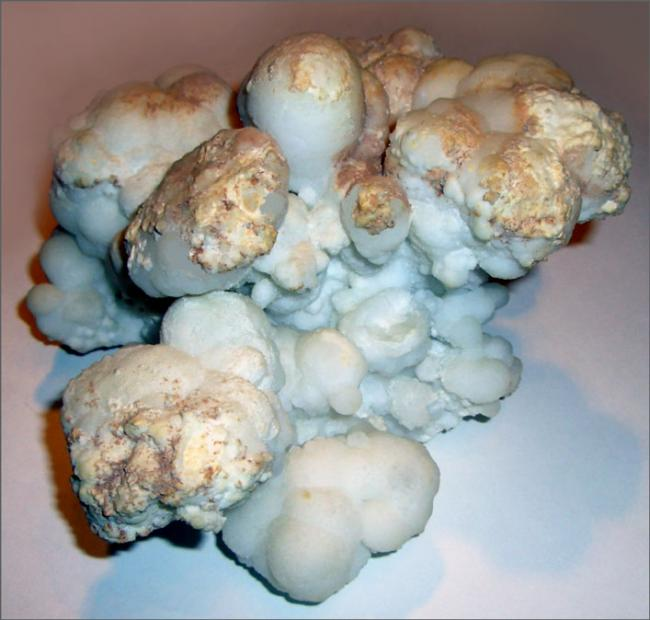
Calcite cave formation: corallite forms ("spheroidalites", - dissymmetrical spherulites)
