= Romanization of Kyrgyz =

Systems for rendering the Kyrgyz language in the Latin alphabet

The Kyrgyz language is written in the Kyrgyz alphabet, a modification of Cyrillic. There is no commonly accepted system of romanization for Kyrgyz, i.e. a rendering of Kyrgyz in the Latin alphabet. For geographic names, the Kyrgyz government adopted the BGN/PCGN romanization system.

There have been periodic discussions about changing the country's official writing system to Latin script. These proposals have seen little progress as the Cyrillic alphabet is more firmly established in Kyrgyzstan than in other post-Soviet Turkic states, which have either successfully switched to Latin script (Azerbaijan, Turkmenistan) or are in active transition (Kazakhstan, Uzbekistan). In April 2023, Russia suspended dairy exports to Kyrgyzstan after the chairman of Kyrgyzstan’s National Commission for the State Language and Language Policies, Kanybek Osmonaliyev, proposed to change the official script from Cyrillic to Latin to bring the country in line with other Turkic-speaking nations. Osmonaliyev was reprimanded by President Sadyr Japarov who then clarified that Kyrgyzstan had no plans to replace the Cyrillic alphabet.

Some Kyrgyz romanization systems are given below:

| Cyrillic | ALA/LC | BGN/PCGN | ISO 9 | Common Turkic | Wiktionary standard |
|---|---|---|---|---|---|
| А а | A a | A a | A a | A a | A a |
| Б б | B b | B b | B b | B b | B b |
| В в | V v | V v | V v | V v | V v |
| Г г | G g | G g | G g | G g | G g |
| Д д | D d | D d | D d | D d | D d |
| Е е | E e | E e | E e | Ye ye, e | Ye ye, e |
| Ё ё | Ë ë | Yo yo | Ë ë | Yo yo | Yo yo |
| Ж ж | Zh zh | J j | Ž ž | C c | J j |
| З з | Z z | Z z | Z z | Z z | Z z |
| И и | I i | I i | I i | İ i | İ i |
| Й й | Ĭ ĭ | Y y | J j | Y y | Y y |
| К к | K k | K k | K k | K k | K k |
| Л л | L l | L l | L l | L l | L l |
| М м | M m | M m | M m | M m | M m |
| Н н | N n | N n | N n | N n | N n |
| Ң ң | N͡g n͡g | Ng ng | N̦ n̦ | Ñ ñ | Ŋ ŋ |
| О о | O o | O o | O o | O o | O o |
| Ө ө | Ȯ ȯ | Ö ö | Ô ô | Ö ö | Ö ö |
| П п | P p | P p | P p | P p | P p |
| Р р | R r | R r | R r | R r | R r |
| С с | S s | S s | S s | S s | S s |
| Т т | T t | T t | T t | T t | T t |
| У у | U u | U u | U u | U u | U u |
| Ү ү | U̇ u̇ | Ü ü | Ù ù | Ü ü | Ü ü |
| Ф ф | F f | F f | F f | F f | F f |
| Х х | Kh kh | Kh kh | H h | H h | H h |
| Ц ц | T͡s t͡s | Ts ts | C c | Ts ts | Ts ts |
| Ч ч | Ch ch | Ch ch | Č č | Ç ç | C c |
| Ш ш | Sh sh | Sh sh | Š š | Ş ş | Ş ş |
| Щ щ | Shch shch | Shch shch | Ŝ ŝ | Şç şç | Şc şc |
| Ъ ъ | ʺ | ˮ | ʺ | ʺ | — |
| Ы ы | Y y | Y y | Y y | I ı | I ı |
| Ь ь | ʹ | ʼ | ʹ | ʹ | — |
| Э э | Ė ė | E e | È è | E e | E e |
| Ю ю | I͡u i͡u | Yu yu | Û û | Yu yu | Yu yu |
| Я я | I͡a i͡a | Ya ya | Â â | Ya ya | Ya ya |

== See also ==
- Kyrgyz alphabet
- Kyrgyz language
