= Batken Region =

Region of Kyrgyzstan

Batken Region Баткен облусу (Kyrgyz) Баткенская область (Russian)
- Region
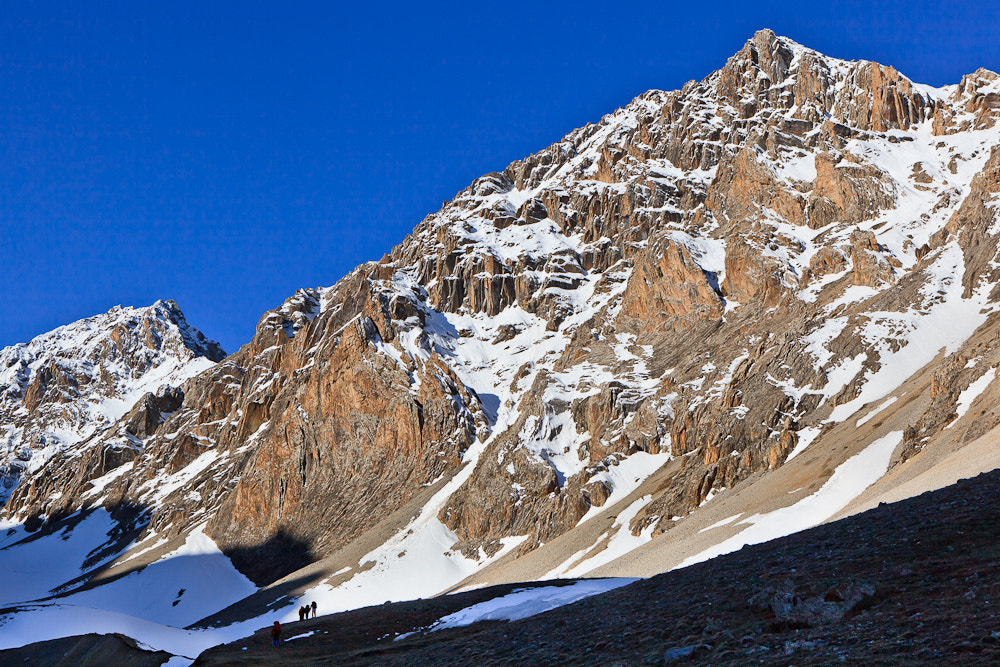
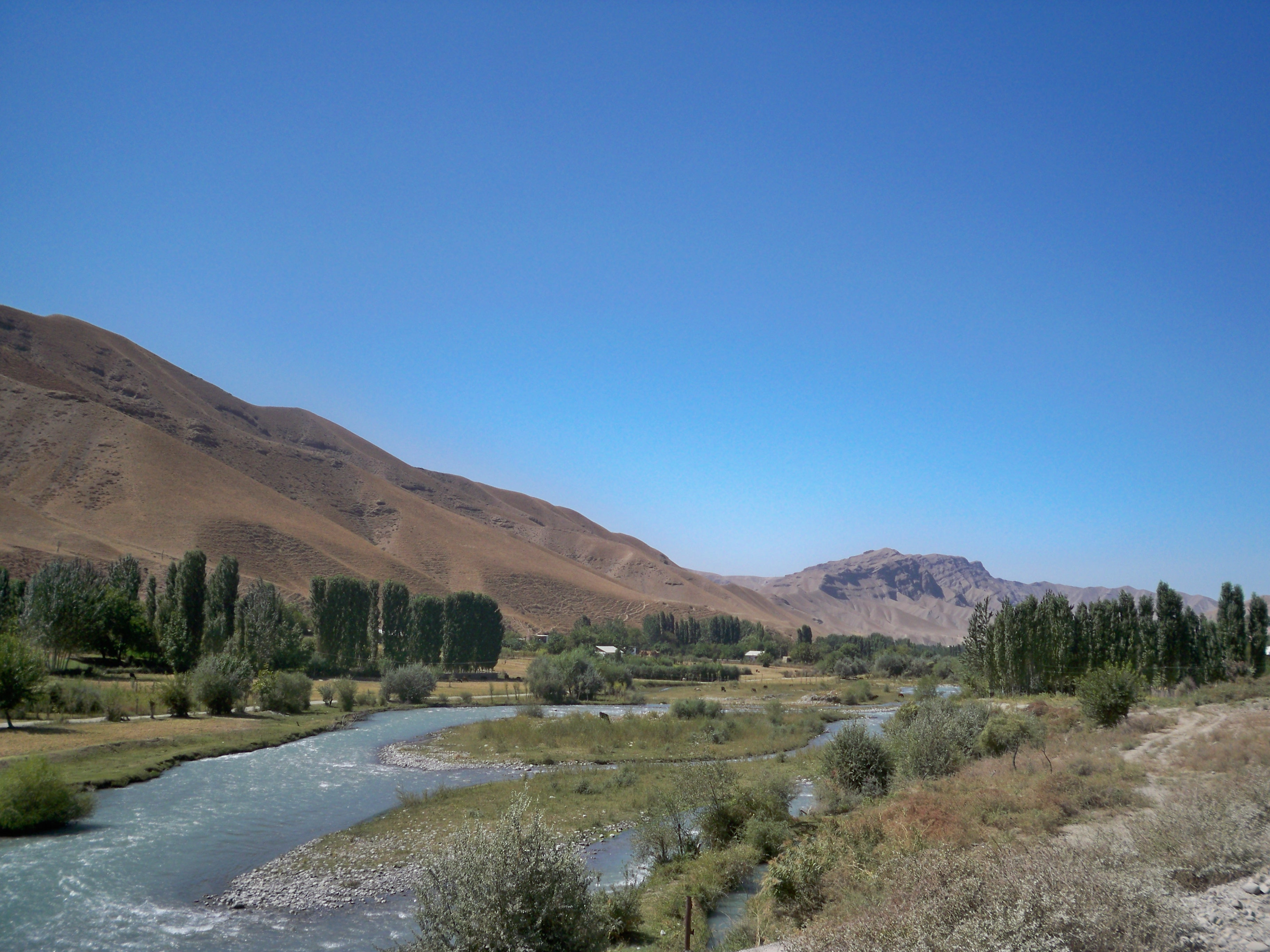
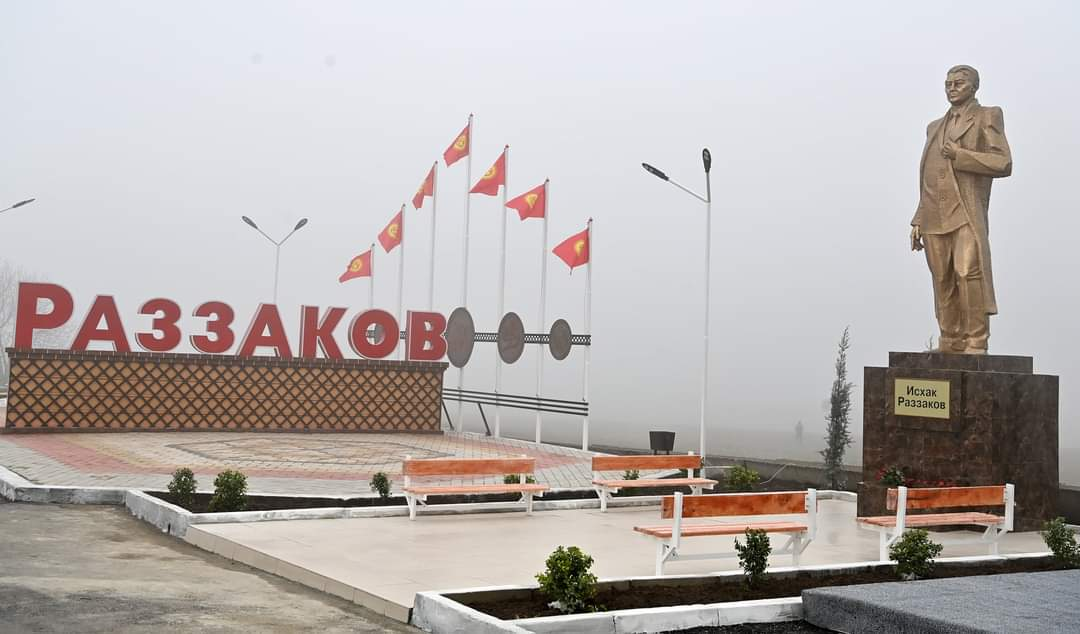
- From the top, Pamir-Alay Mountains, Khojabakirgan, Razzaqov Road and field in Batken

- Flag Coat of arms

- Map of Kyrgyzstan, location of Batken Region highlighted
- Coordinates: 39°50′N 71°30′E
- Country: Kyrgyzstan
- Capital: Batken

Government
  - Governor: Mamat Aibalayev

Area
  - Total: 17,048 km^{2} (6,582 sq mi)

Population (2023-01-01)
  - Total: 570,898
  - Density: 33.488/km^{2} (86.733/sq mi)
- Time zone: UTC+6 (Kyrgyzstan Time)
- ISO 3166 code: KG-B
- Districts: 3
- Cities: 6
- Towns: 1
- Villages: 198

Batken (Note: Kyrgyz: Баткен дубаны, romanized: Batken dubany, pronounced [batˈken dʊbɑˈnɯ]) is a region of Kyrgyzstan. Its capital is Batken. It is bounded on the east by Osh Region, on the south, west and north by Tajikistan, and on the northeast by Uzbekistan. The northern part of the region is part of the flat, agricultural Ferghana Valley. The land rises southward to the mountains on the southern border: the Alay Mountains in the east, and the Turkestan Range in the west. Its total area is 17,048 km^{2} (6,582 sq mi). The resident population of the region was 548,247 as of January 2021. The region has sizeable Uzbek (14.7% in 2009) and Tajik (6.9% in 2009) minorities.

== History ==
Batken Region was created on 15 October 1999 from the westernmost section of Osh Region. This was partly in response to the activities of the Islamic Movement for Uzbekistan (IMU), with bases in Tajikistan. In 1999 they kidnapped a group of Japanese geologists and in 2000 some American climbers. In the two years, 49 Kyrgyz soldiers were killed. There was an attack on a Tajik border post in May 2006, which was probably connected to drug running. In 2021, a conflict over water rights left at least 55 dead and 277 wounded.

The area has been a target for the suppression of Islam. In October of 2023, 37 mosques and schools were closed by the government. This happened soon after 60 mosques and religious schools were closed by raids in the Osh Region.

== Divisions ==
The Batken Region is divided administratively into three cities of regional significance (Batken, Kyzyl-Kyya and Sülüktü), and three districts:

District	Seat	Map
Batken District	Batken	
Kadamjay District	Kadamjay	
Leylek District	Isfana	

Aydarken, Isfana and Kadamjay are cities of district significance. There is one urban-type settlement in the region: Vostochnyy (part of Sülüktü city).

== Socio-economics ==
The economically active population of Batken Region in 2009 was 188,808, of which 176,611 employed and 12,197 (6.5%) unemployed.

- Export: 14.7 million US dollars (2008)
- Import: 53.6 million US dollars (2008)

== Demographics ==
The population of Batken Region, according to the Population and Housing Census of 2009 amounted to 380.3 thousand (enumerated de facto population) or 428.6 thousand (de jure population). The official population estimate for January 2021 was 548,247. In 2009 24.2% of the population lived in the region's cities and urban-type settlements, and 75.8% in the rural areas.

Historical populations in Batken Region
Year	Pop.	±% p.a.
1970	200,328	—
1979	237,469	+1.91%
1989	311,761	+2.76%
1999	382,426	+2.06%
2009	428,636	+1.15%
2022	561,443	+2.10%
Note: de jure population; Sources:

=== Ethnic composition ===
According to the 2009 Census, the ethnic composition of the Batken Region (de jure population) was:

Ethnic group	Population	Proportion of Batken Region population
Kyrgyzs	327,739	76.5%
Uzbeks	63,048	14.7%
Tajiks	29,569	6.9%
Russians	3,560	0.8%
Tatars	1,910	0.4%
Turks	888	0.2%
Uygurs	264	0.1%
other groups	1,295	0.3%

== Enclaves and exclaves ==
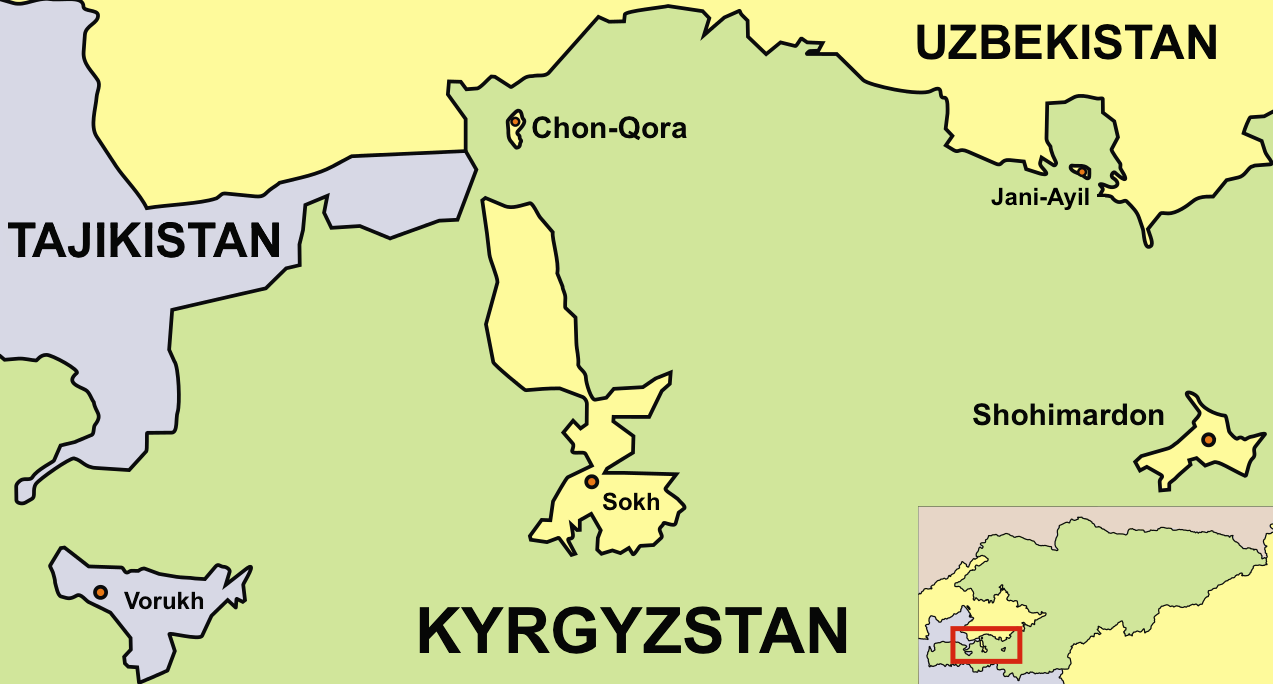
Map of Enclaves in Batken Region

In the Soviet period, six enclaves and exclaves were established in the Batken area. Two were Tajik, while four others were Uzbek. In 2026, two of the Uzbek exclaves were swapped for land from Kyrgyzstan, thus extinguishing them.

Sokh (or Soʻx) (40°02′39″N 71°05′39″E) is an exclave of Uzbekistan, about 24 kilometres east of Batken. The largest of the exclaves, it has an area of ~234 square kilometres, stretches from 3 to 13 kilometres from east to west, and about 35 kilometres north to south, and is crossed by the main highway from Batken to Osh. Tajiks comprise 99 percent of the population, which in 1993 numbered 42,800.

Lolazor (also Western Qalacha or Qayraghoch) near Kyrgyz town of Kayragach (40°04′05″N 69°32′41″E) is a very small exclave of Tajikistan, located in the northwest corner of the region near the railway station of Stantsiya Kayragach, about 130 kilometres west of Batken. The border separates it from the Tajik town of Qal'acha; hence it is sometimes called "Western Qal'acha."

Shohimardon (39°58′59″N 71°48′18″E), or Shakhimardan, is an exclave of Uzbekistan, about 80 kilometres east of Batken and 19 kilometres south of the Uzbek border. It has an area of ~38.2 square kilometres, and a population in 1993 of 5,100. Uzbeks comprise 91 per cent of the population.

Vorukh (39°51′04″N 70°38′00″E) is an exclave of Tajikistan, with an area of ~96.7 square kilometers, located 45 kilometres south of Isfara and 24 kilometres southwest of Batken, on the right bank of the river Karavshin. The population, distributed among 17 villages, is estimated to be between 23,000 and 29,000, 95 percent of which are Tajiks and 5 percent Kyrgyz.

== Travel ==
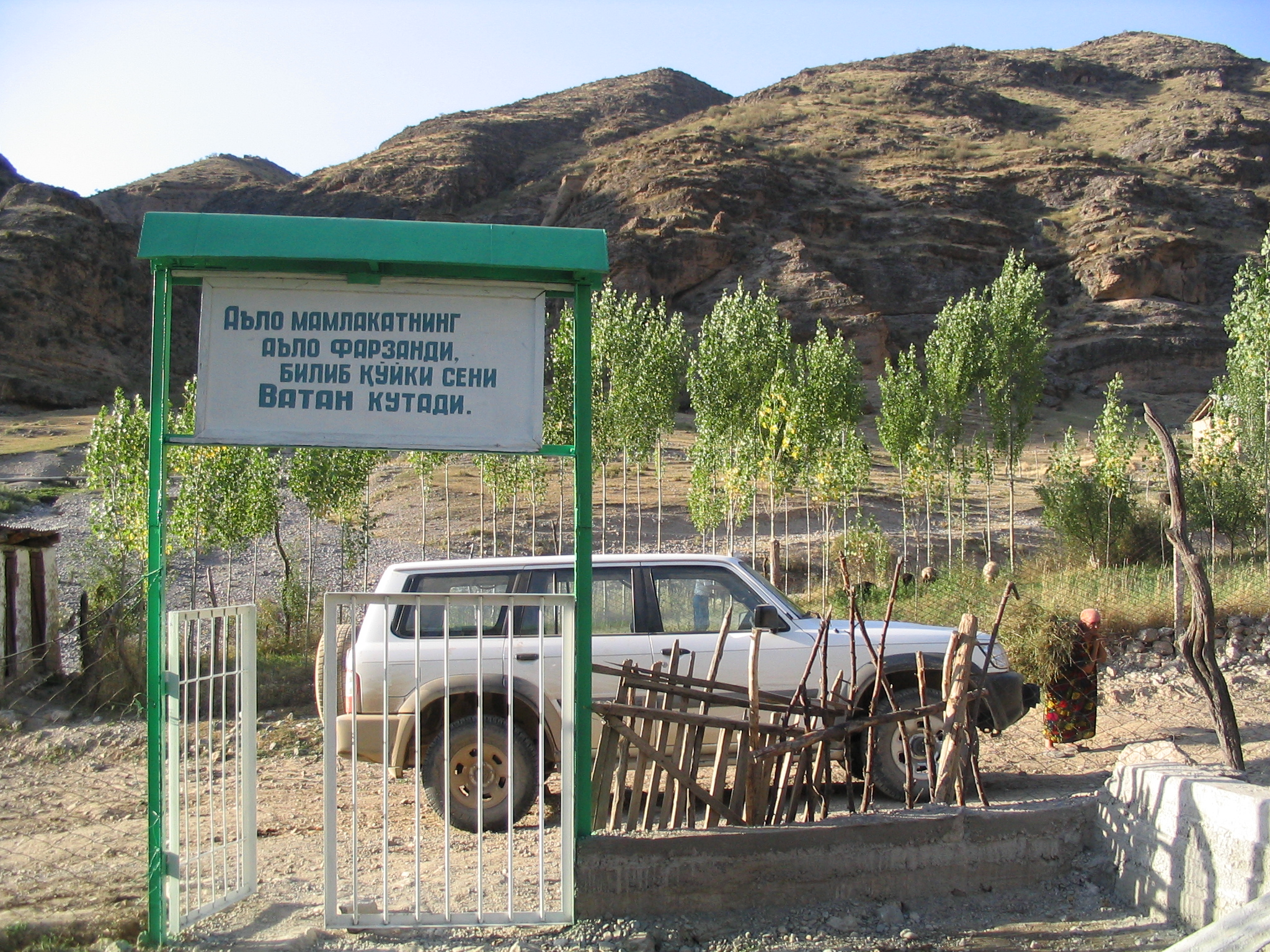
School at Batken area

The southern mountains offer excellent, but very difficult climbing with many sheer rock faces. Summits are Pyramid Peak [5,509 meters (18,074 ft)] and Pik Skalistiy [5,621 meters (18,442 ft)].

In August 2000, the Batken region received international attention after a group of climbers, including acclaimed climber Tommy Caldwell, was taken hostage by a group of rebel Uzbeks associated with the Islamic Movement of Uzbekistan whilst on an expedition in the Kara-Suu Valley. Speaking about scenery of Kara-Suu, Caldwell described the area as "unbelievably beautiful."

Tourism is still relatively undeveloped in the Batken region compared to the rest of Kyrgyzstan. In recent years, the government has shown interest in developing the region and many foreigners have managed to visit with the help of local authorities. The nearby Turkestan Range is often referred to as the "Asian Patagonia" by local trekking operators, in reference to the granite towers and the untouched wilderness that define the area.

== Notable people ==
- Rakhat Achylova, sociologist and politician (1941–2015)

== Sources ==
- Laurence Mitchell, Kyrgyzstan, Bradt Travel Guides, 2008.
