= Khojabakirgan =

Kozu-Baglan/Khojabakirgan River
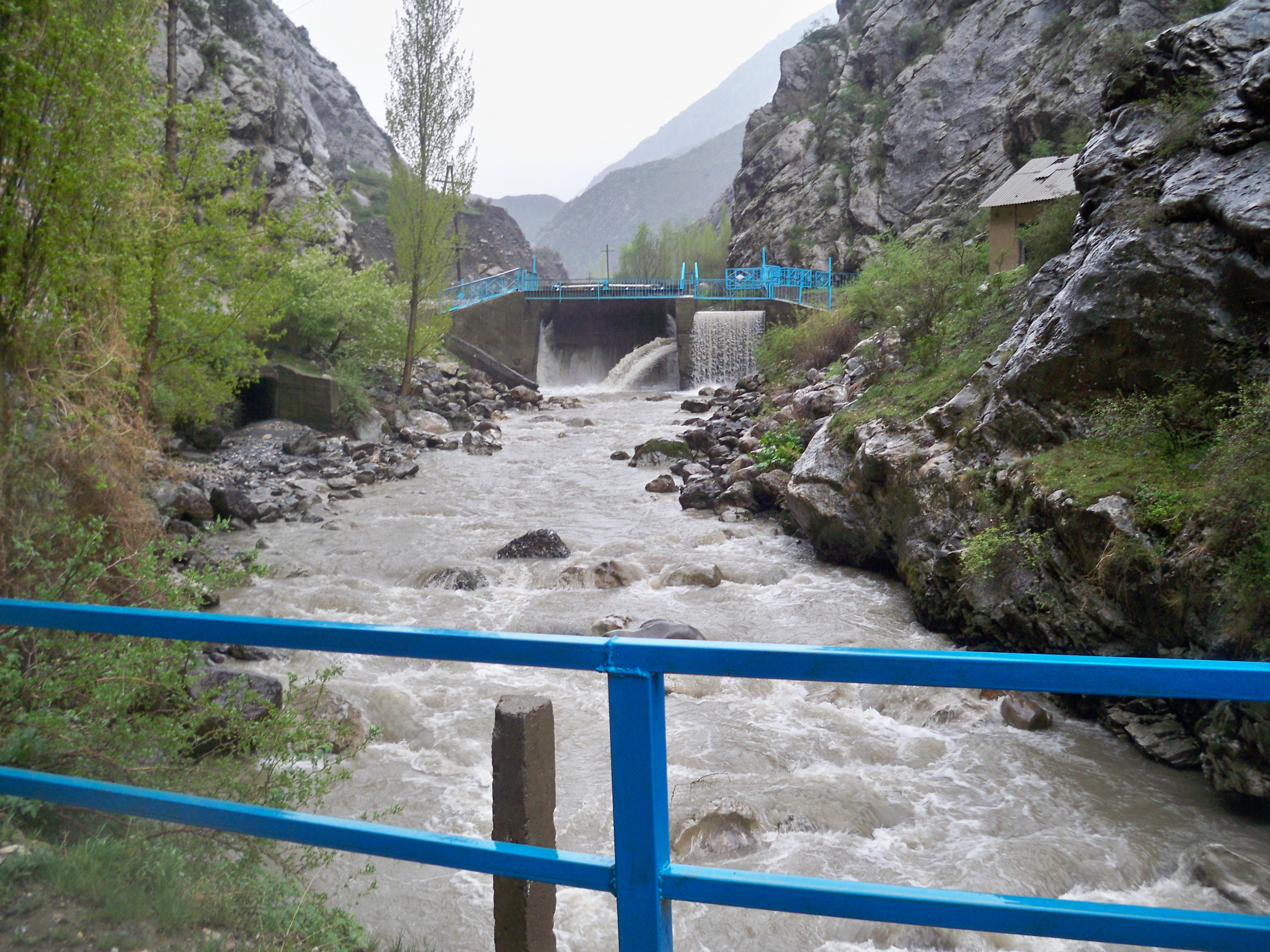
- The Kozu-Baglan/Khojabakirgan River as seen in Katrang, Kyrgyzstan

- Location within Kyrgyzstan
- Native name: Козу-Баглан (Kyrgyz); Хочабакиргон (Tajik); Xoʻjabaqirgʻon/Xoʻjabaqirgan (Uzbek)

Location
- Country: Kyrgyzstan and Tajikistan
- Districts: Leilek, Kyrgyzstan; Jabbor Rasulov and Ghafurov, Tajikistan
- Towns/villages: Katrang, Korgon, Beshkent, Kayragach, and Qal'acha

Physical characteristics
- Source
  - location: Turkestan Range, Leilek District, Kyrgyzstan
- Mouth: Syr Darya
  - coordinates: 40°15′43″N 69°34′59″E
- Length: 117 km (73 mi)
- Discharge
  - average: 10.3 m^{3}/s (360 cu ft/s)

Basin features
- Progression: Syr Darya→ North Aral Sea

The Khojabakirgan (Tajik: Хочабакиргон; Uzbek: Xoʻjabaqirgʻon/Xoʻjabaqirgan), called the Kozu-Baglan (Kyrgyz: Козу-Баглан) in its upper reaches in Kyrgyzstan, is a left tributary of the Syr Darya that flows from Kyrgyzstan into Tajikistan.

A 2023 study found the Kozu-Baglan/Khojabakirgan Watershed to be the most "water-stressed" transboundary watershed in the Fergana Valley. The river has been a focal point of water-related disputes between Kyrgyzstan and Tajikistan.

== Name ==
The name xo‘jabaqirgan is commonly interpreted to mean "the place a Khoja screamed." In the Uzbek Soviet Encyclopedia, it is spelled Xoʻjabaqirgan, while the National Encyclopedia of Uzbekistan uses the spelling Xoʻjabaqirgʻon, which reflects older forms of Uzbek orthography. In English-language sources, the river's name appears in various forms, including Khojabakirgan, Khoja-Bakirgan, Khojabakirghan, Khodji-Bakirgan, and Khojabakirgansai.

In Kyrgyzstan, the river is known as Kozu-Baglan in its upper reaches, particularly among Kyrgyz-speaking communities. Further downstream, Uzbeks refer to the river as Khojabakirgan. Soviet-era sources, including those published in the Kyrgyz SSR, primarily used the name Khojabakirgan. The river was officially renamed Kozu-Baglan in Kyrgyzstan following independence.

== Course ==
The Khojabakirgan River originates on the northern slopes of the Turkestan Range in Leilek District, Batken Region, Kyrgyzstan. It initially flows in a predominantly northeasterly direction through the foothills before turning north and then northwest. Upon reaching the border with Tajikistan, the river disperses into a network of irrigation canals, with a significant portion of its flow diverted into the Great Fergana Canal. The main river channel continues northwest, passing near the cities of Chkalov and Khujand, before emptying into the southern bank of the Syr Darya.

== Hydrology ==
The Khojabakirgan is 117 km long. It drains an area of 2,150 km^{2}. The mean discharge 45 km above the mouth is approximately 11 m^{3}/s.

Along with the Ak-Suu and Isfana river basins, the Ak-Suu river basin sits above the Suliukta–Batken–Nau–Isfara transboundary aquifer in the Syr Darya Basin. The Khojabakirgan subbasin is prone to flash floods.

== Transboundary disputes ==
The Khojabakirgan River has been a source of tension between Kyrgyzstan and Tajikistan. In 2021, Kyrgyzstan announced plans to construct a reservoir on the river, prompting an immediate objection from Tajikistan. Tajik authorities argued that the project would violate existing bilateral agreements and that Kyrgyzstan was obligated to consult with Tajikistan before undertaking such developments.

The sharing of the river's water is governed by a 1962 agreement signed between the Kyrgyz and Tajik Soviet Socialist Republics, which allocated 79 percent of the river's annual flow to Tajikistan and 21 percent to Kyrgyzstan. In 2020, Kyrgyzstan announced that it had allocated funds to build a pipeline to divert water from the river to the border village of Maksat.
