= Aktyube =

Aktyube may refer to:

- Aktyube, Almaty Region, Kazakhstan
- Aktyube, Astrakhan Oblast, Russia
- Ak-Tyube, Tajikistan

== See also ==
- Aktobe, Kazakhstan
