= Sariosiyo, Spitamen =

Sariosiyo Сариосиё
- Village
- Location in Tajikistan
- Coordinates: 40°10′41.68″N 69°19′28.52″E
- Country: Tajikistan
- Region: Sughd Region
- District: Spitamen District

Population (2020)
  - Total: 9,092
- Time zone: UTC+5 (TJT)

Sariosiyo (Tajik: Сариосиё), called Qushtegirmoon (Tajik: Қӯштегирмон) until 2017, is a village in north-western Tajikistan. It is located in Spitamen District of Sughd Region. The village lies to the northwest of the town of Navkat and south of the Syr Darya. As of 2020, Saidkala had a population of 9,092.

== Population ==
Historical population
Year	Pop.	±% p.a.
2010	7,855	—
2020	9,092	+1.47%
Note: resident population; Sources:
