= Ak-Suu (Syr Darya) =

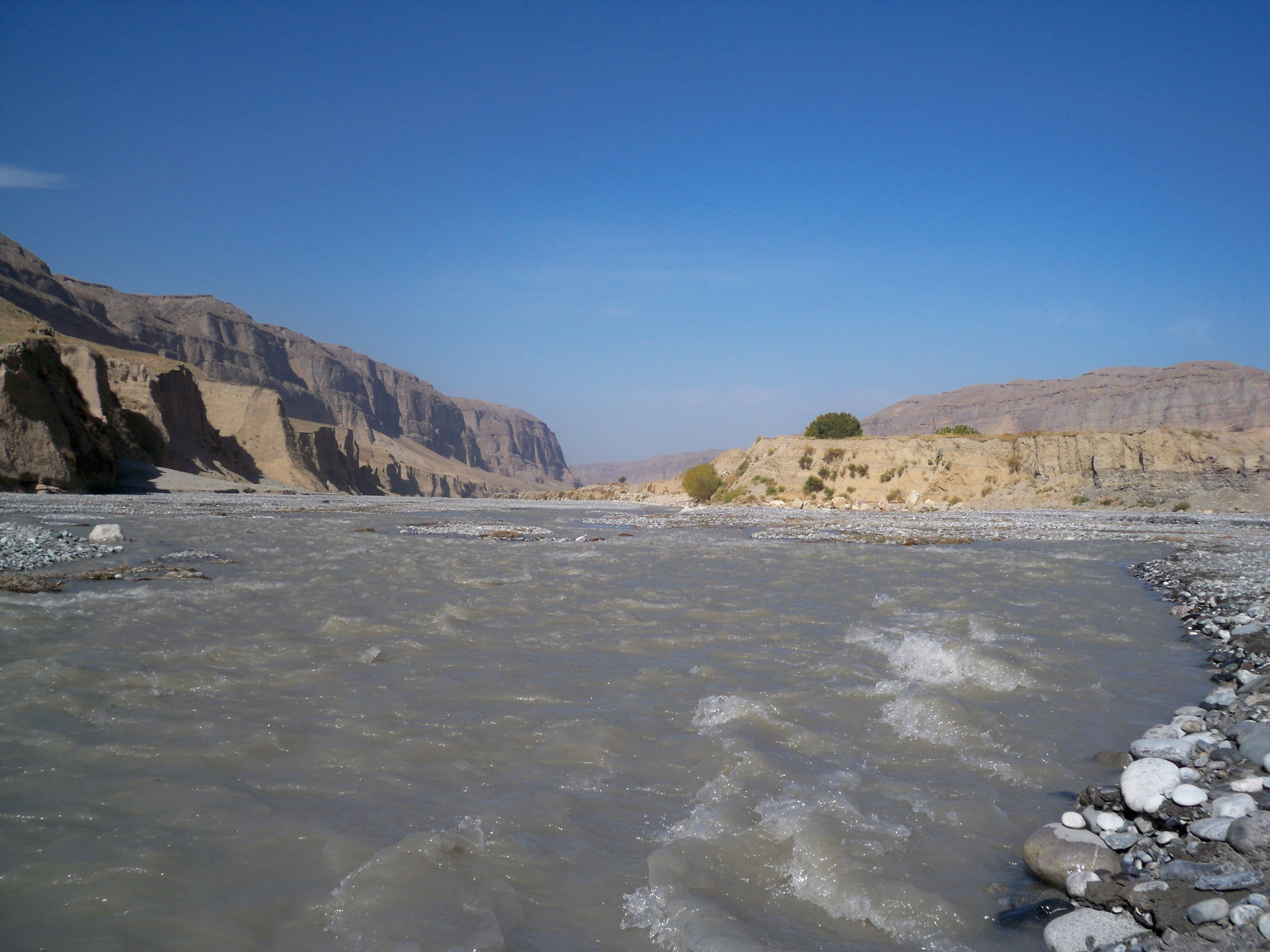
- The Ak-Suu near the village of Chuyanchy, Leylek District, Kyrgyzstan
- Native name: Ак-Суу (Kyrgyz); Оқсу (Tajik); Oqsuv (Uzbek)

Location
- Country: Kyrgyzstan and Tajikistan
- Districts: Leilek, Kyrgyzstan and Spitamen, Tajikistan
- Towns/villages: Ak-Suu, Jar-Kyshtak and Navkat

Physical characteristics
- Source
  - location: Turkestan Range
- Mouth
  - location: Syr Darya
  - coordinates: 40.1933°N 69.3424°E
- Length: 93 km (58 mi)
- Basin size: 1,170 km^{2} (450 sq mi)
- Discharge
  - average: 3.81 m^{3}/s (135 cu ft/s)

Basin features
- Progression: Syr Darya→ North Aral Sea
- Tributaries
  - left: Tenisbai, Kel, Djakurut, Berk-Suu, Gudunduk

The Ak-Suu or Aksu (Kyrgyz: Ак-Суу; Tajik: Оқсу; Uzbek: Oqsuv) is a left tributary of the Syr Darya, flowing through Batken Region of Kyrgyzstan and Sughd Region of Tajikistan. The river starts at Ay-Kul, in the north slopes of Turkestan Range in Sarkent State Nature Park.

The river flows into the river Syr Darya near the town Navkat in northern Tajikistan. However, the river is fully diverted for irrigation and rarely reaches the Syr Darya. The main settlements along the river include the village of Ak-Suu in Kyrgyzstan and the town of Navkat in Tajikistan.

Most communities along the river in both Kyrgyzstan and Tajikistan cultivate rice, relying on the river's water for irrigation. In Tajikistan, the water is also used to grow other crops, including cotton, onions, and maize.

== Name ==
The name Ak-Suu means "white water" in Turkic languages. Numerous rivers in Central Asia bear this name. According to one interpretation, rivers originating from glaciers are often referred to as Ak-Suu. The name is also attested in historical sources; for example, Babur mentions several rivers named Ak-Suu in his memoir, the Baburname.

== Course ==
The Ak-Suu River originates at Ay-Kul, on the northern slopes of the Turkestan Range within the Sarkent State Nature Park in Kyrgyzstan. It flows in a generally northerly direction, crossing into Tajikistan, where it approaches the Syr Darya near the town of Navkat. However, due to complete diversion for irrigation purposes, the river rarely reaches the Syr Darya.

The majority of the river's flow is diverted through an irrigation channel near the village of Langar in Tajikistan. In Kyrgyzstan, a levee is currently under construction near the village of Ak-Suu, aimed at narrowing the riverbed and reclaiming land for agricultural use.

== Hydrology ==
The Ak-Suu River is 93 kilometres (58 mi) long and has a drainage basin of 1,170 square kilometres (450 sq mi). Its average flow rate is 3.81 m^{3}/s (135 cu ft/s).

Along with the Khojabakirgan and Isfana river basins, the Ak-Suu river basin sits above the Suluytka–Batken–Nau–Isfara transboundary aquifer in the Syr Darya Basin. The Ak-Suu subbasin is prone to flash floods; one such event in 2015 caused damage to several houses.
