= Saidkala =

Saidkala Саидқалъа
- Village
- Location in Tajikistan
- Coordinates: 40°10′28.84″N 69°22′36.95″E
- Country: Tajikistan
- Region: Sughd Region
- District: Spitamen District

Population (2020)
  - Total: 10,599
- Time zone: UTC+5 (TJT)

Saidkala (Tajik: Саидқалъа), called Saidkurgon (Tajik: Саидқӯрғон) until 2017, is a village in north-western Tajikistan. It is located in Spitamen District of Sughd Region. The village lies to the north of the town of Navkat and south of the Syr Darya. As of 2020, Saidkala had a population of 10,599.

== Population ==
Historical population
Year	Pop.	±% p.a.
2010	7,946	—
2020	10,599	+2.92%
Note: resident population; Sources:
