= Isfana River =

Isfana River Isfanasay
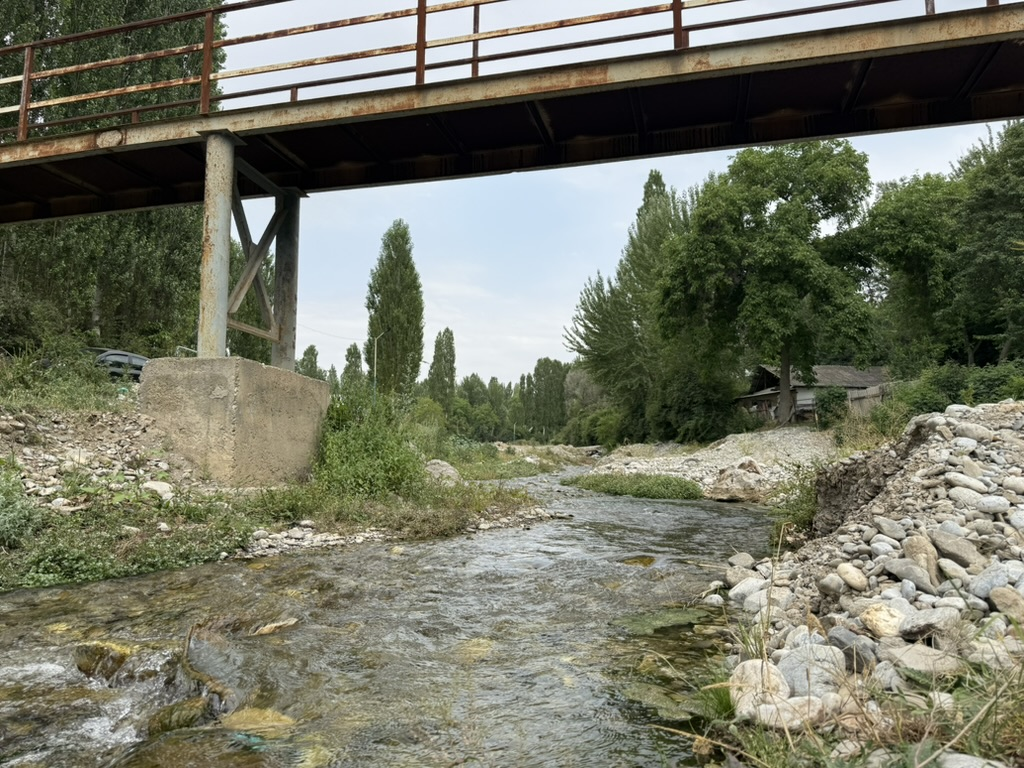
- The Isfana River as seen in central Razzkov

- Location within Kyrgyzstan
- Native name: Исфана суусу (Kyrgyz)

Location
- Country: Kyrgyzstan and Tajikistan
- Districts: Leilek, Kyrgyzstan; Jabbor Rasulov and Spitamen, Tajikistan
- Towns/villages: Razzakov, Chimgen, Samat, Andarsoy, and Ghulakandoz

Physical characteristics
- Source
  - location: Turkestan Range, Leilek District, Kyrgyzstan
  - coordinates: 39°42′36.1″N 69°43′22.2″E
  - elevation: 2,500 m (8,200 ft)
- 2nd source
  - location: Turkestan Range, Leilek District, Kyrgyzstan
  - coordinates: 39°42′13.8″N 69°40′54″E
  - elevation: 2,300 m (7,500 ft)
- 3rd source
  - location: Turkestan Range, Leilek District, Kyrgyzstan
  - coordinates: 39°46′29.8″N 69°34′27.5″E
  - elevation: 1,800 m (5,900 ft)
- Mouth
  - location: Ghulakandoz, Jabbor Rasulov District, Tajikistan
  - coordinates: 40°12′27.2″N 69°24′50.9″E
  - elevation: 0 m (0 ft)
- Length: 35 km (22 mi) – 69 km (43 mi)
- Discharge
  - location: Chimgen, Kyrgyzstan
  - average: 0.6 m^{3}/s (21 cu ft/s)
  - minimum: 0.1 m^{3}/s (3.5 cu ft/s)
  - maximum: 1.41 m^{3}/s (50 cu ft/s)
- Discharge
  - location: Kurgoncha, Tajikistan
  - average: 0.47 m^{3}/s (17 cu ft/s)
  - minimum: 0.1 m^{3}/s (3.5 cu ft/s)
  - maximum: 0.84 m^{3}/s (30 cu ft/s)

Basin features
- Progression: Syr Darya→ North Aral Sea

The Isfana River (Kyrgyz: Исфана суусу; Uzbek: Isfana soyi; Russian: река Исфана), also called Isfanasay is a north-flowing transboundary river in Central Asia. It is approximately 69 kilometres (43 mi) long and flows through Razzakov, which was also called Isfana until 2022. The river's course runs through Kyrgyzstan and Tajikistan, from the Turkestan Range into the Syr Darya. Most of the river's water is diverted for irrigation or seeps into the ground, and as such it rarely reaches the Syr-Darya.

The Isfana is fed by unnamed glaciers on the northern flank of the Turkestan Range as well as groundwater. It has 31 tributaries, most of which meet in and around Razzakov. One of the several transboundary rivers in the Syr-Darya basin, the Isfana River flows parallel to the Khojabakirgan River. International donor organizations have supported the establishment of small basin councils in the Isfana River basin, particularly in Tajikistan.

== Name ==
The word "isfana" is believed to have come from the Sogdian word asbanikat, asbanikent or aspanakent which means "the land of horses". In Kyrgyz, the river is called Isfana suusu (Kyrgyz: Иcфана суусу), and in Uzbek it is called Isfana soyi or Isfanasoy, which means the "Isfana Creek".

== Course ==
The headwaters of the Isfana are several unnamed glaciers at roughly 2,500 metres (8,200 ft) elevation in the northern region of the Turkestan Range called Altynbeshik (Kyrgyz: Алтынбешик; Uzbek: Oltinbeshik). The upper portion of the river flows roughly north and northwest. The Isfana River has supported irrigated agriculture since antiquity. Archaeological investigations conducted during the Soviet period documented the remains of ancient irrigation infrastructure in its basin, including karez systems and canals, with some features dating at least to the medieval period.

As it passes through the Dagana Gorge (Kyrgyz: Дагана; Uzbek: Dahana) into the Toojayloo basin (Kyrgyz: Төөжайлоо; Uzbek: Tuyayaylov), the river disappears underground. The dry riverbed runs through the Isfana-Kara-Bulak basin and reaches eastern Razzakov, where it reemerges and is fed by several artesian wells.

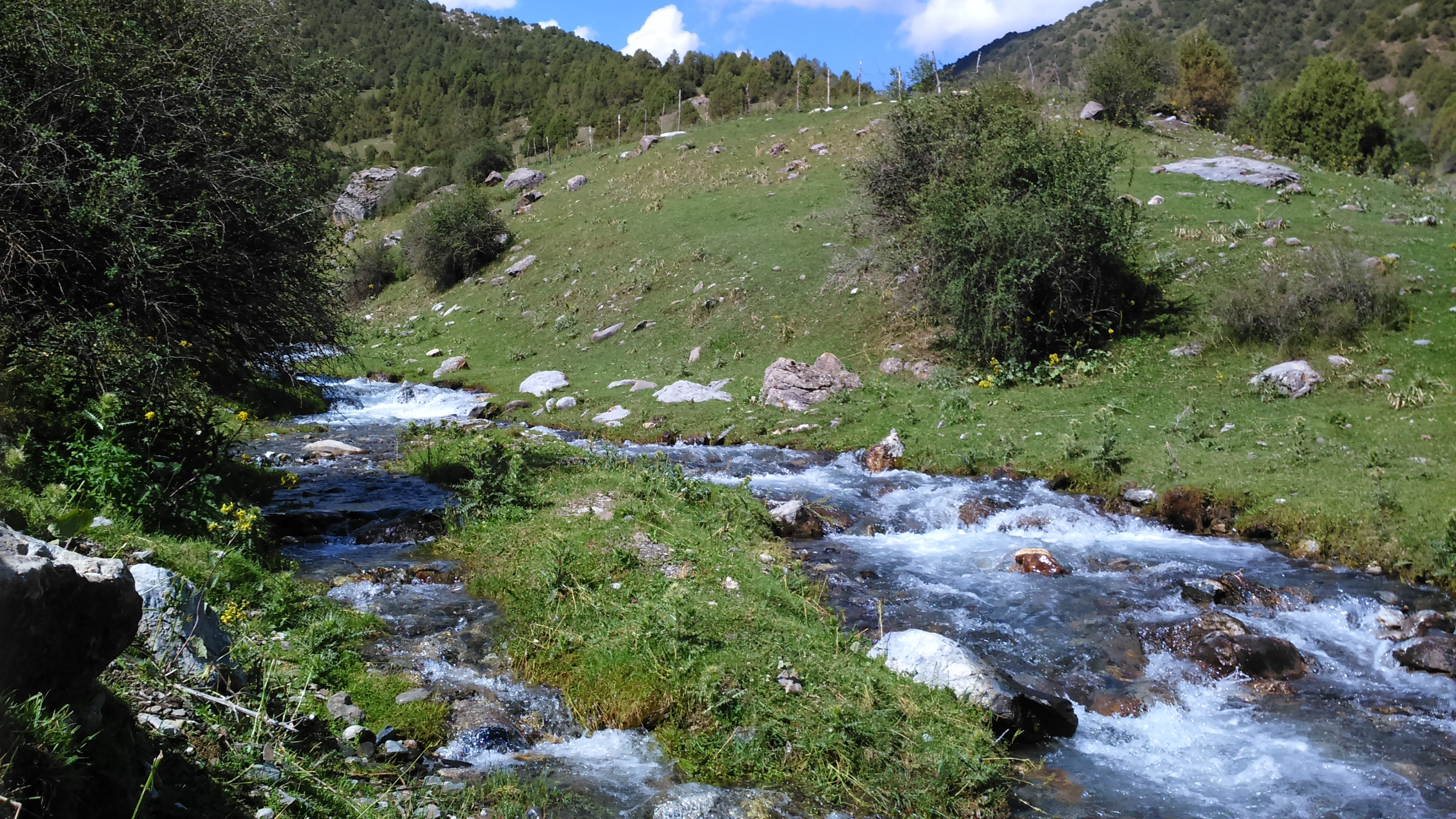
Tegirmenlik Creek, one of the uppermost tributaries of the Isfana River

The Isfana River has 31 tributaries. The portion of the river that runs west from the Dagana Gorge to eastern Razzakov is called Tegirmenlik (variously spelled as Тегирмелик and Тегермалик in Kyrgyz; Uzbek: Tegirmonlik), and the portion that flows through Razzakov is called the Say (Kyrgyz: Сай; Uzbek: Soy), which literally means a "creek". In central Razzakov, the Say receives the Cholgan Creek (Uzbek: Choʻlgan soyi), also fed by an artesian well, from the right.

In the north-west of Razzakov, the Say joins the Taylan Creek, forming the Isfana River proper. The Taylan Creek is also fed by several unnamed glaciers at roughly 1,800 metres (5,900 ft) elevation in Kekche-Tau Mountain (Kyrgyz: Кекче-Тау; Uzbek: Quchchi) in the Turkestan Range. The portion of the Taylan Creek that runs from the eponymous village through Razzakov until it merges with the Say is called the Uzunsay (Kyrgyz: Узунсай; Uzbek: Uzunsoy).

After travelling north from Razzakov for roughly 40 kilometres (25 mi), the Isfana River enters Jabbor Rasulov District of Tajikistan. Near the villages of Andarsoy and Khitoy, the river is diverted into irrigation canals supplying agricultural land. As a result, the natural channel usually runs dry downstream, and the river rarely reaches the Syr Darya except during periods of high discharge such as flash floods.

=== Tributaries ===
Tributaries of the Upper Isfana include:

- Tegirmenlik / Say (which in turn receives Cholgan Creek from the right in central Razzakov)
- Taylan / Uzunsay

== Hydrology ==
Sources differ on the length of the Isfana River, putting it from 35 kilometres (22 mi) to 69 kilometres (43 mi) long. Most of the annual runoff of the river occurs from May to June, with lowest water levels from February to March.

The Isfana River has an average discharge of anywhere between 0.2 m^{3}/s (7.1 cu ft/s)-0.3 m^{3}/s (11 cu ft/s) to 3.1 m^{3}/s (110 cu ft/s). Along with the Ak-Suu and Khojabakirgan river basins, the Isfana river basin sits above the Suluytka–Batken–Nau–Isfara transboundary aquifer in the Syr Darya Basin.

In the spring, the Isfana River often overflows, causing flash floods. Flash floods in the river's basin have become more common since the late 1980s.
