= Muras, Batken =

Muras Kyrgyz: Мурас
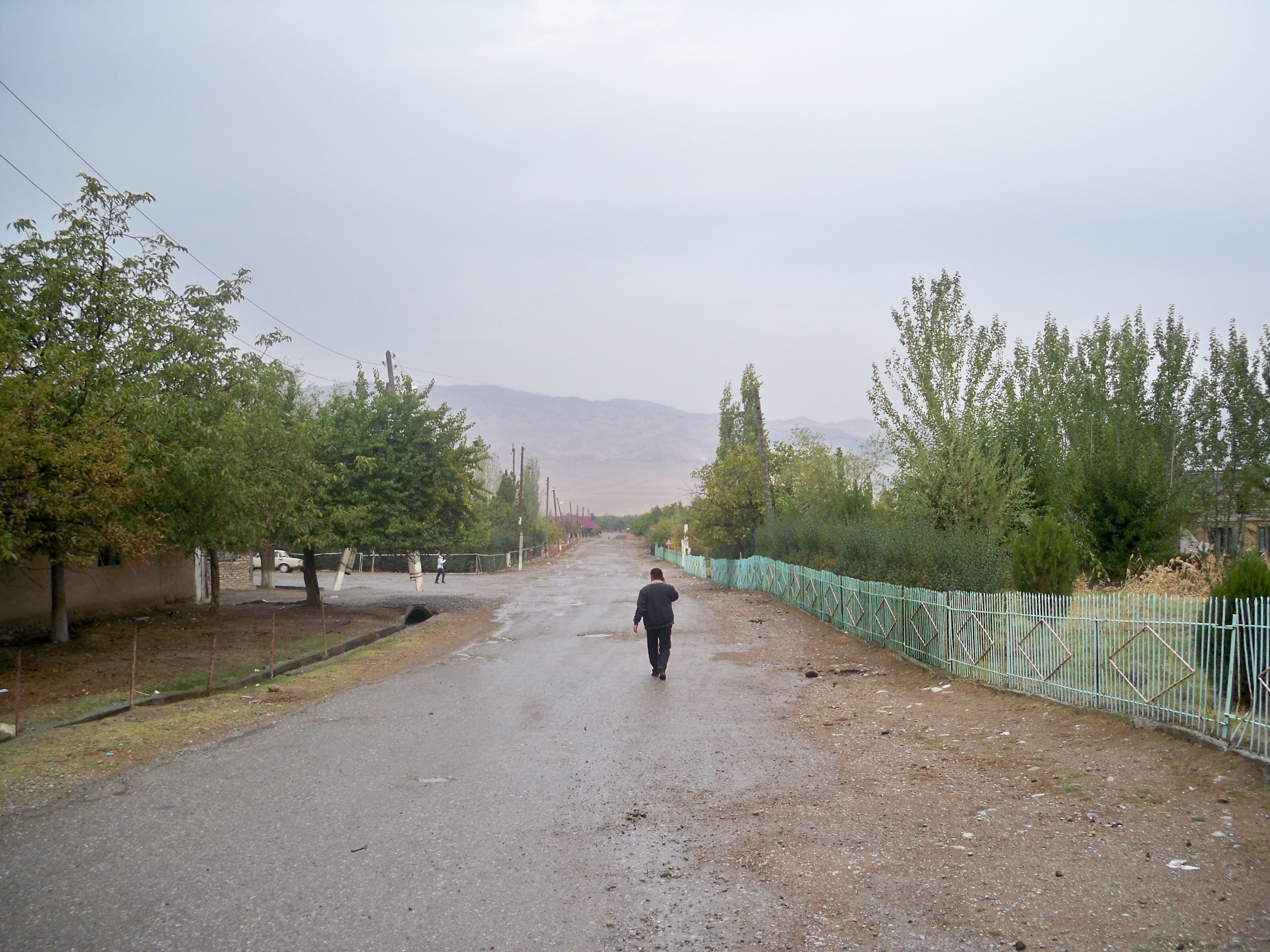

- Location within Kyrgyzstan
- Coordinates: 40°1′38.3″N 69°56′32.9″E
- Country: Kyrgyzstan
- Region: Batken
- District: Leylek
- Elevation: 1,028 m (3,373 ft)

Population (2021)
  - Total: 3,208
- Time zone: UTC+6

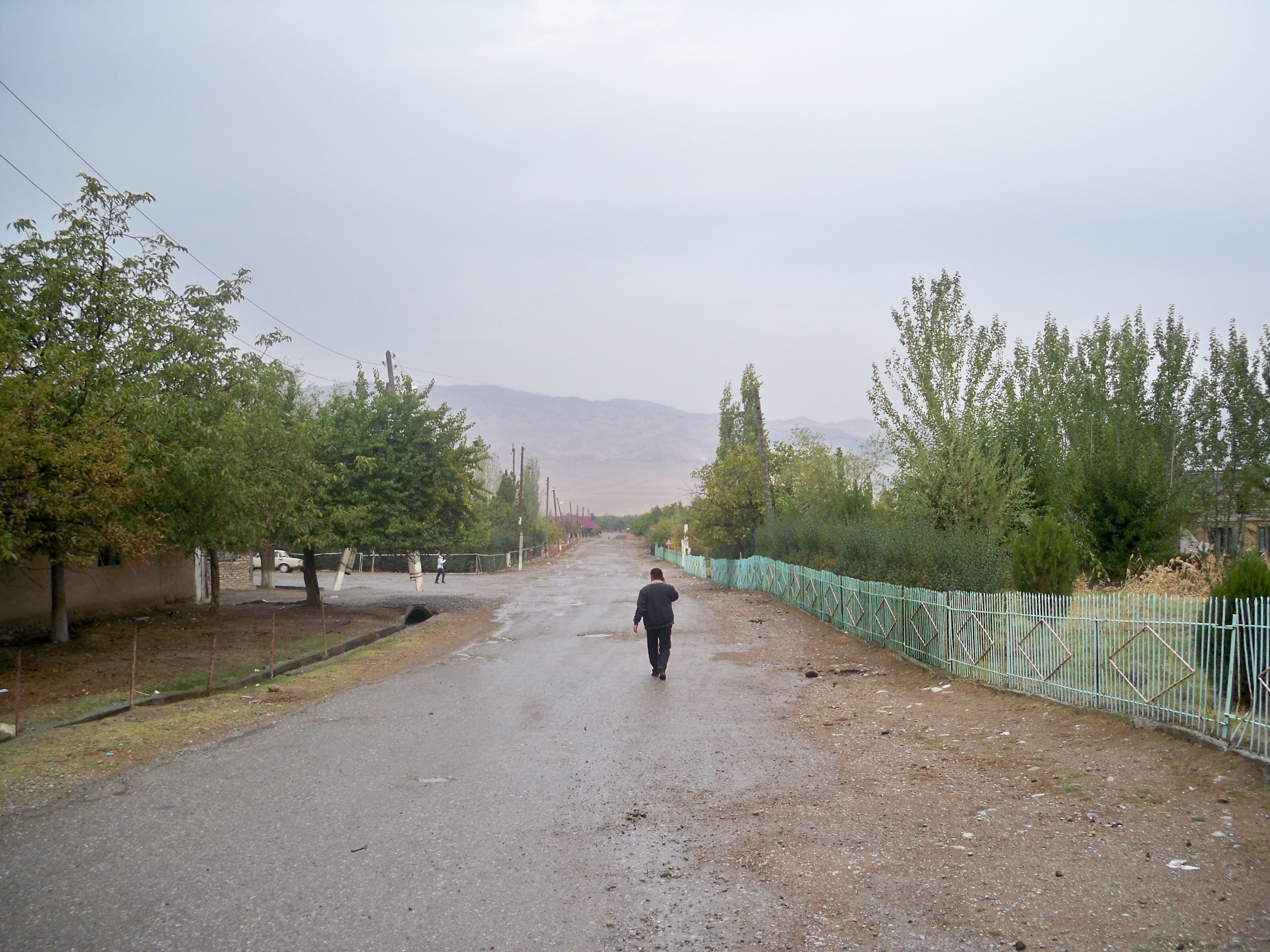

Muras (Kyrgyz: Мурас) previously known as Margun (Kyrgyz: Маргун) is a village in the Batken Region of Kyrgyzstan. It is part of the Leylek District. Its population was 3,208 in 2021. Nearby towns and villages include Uch-Bulak (4 miles) and Katrang (13 miles).
