= Andarsoy =

- Location in Tajikistan
- Coordinates: 40°4′26″N 69°26′36″E
- Country: Tajikistan
- Region: Sughd Region
- District: Spitamen District
- Official languages: Russian (Interethnic); Tajik (State)

Andarsoy (Russian and Tajik: Андарсой) is a village in Sughd Region, northern Tajikistan. It is part of the jamoat Tursun Uljaboev (formerly: Nov) in Spitamen District. The Isfana River, called the Andarsoy River in its lower course, flows through the village of Andarsoy.
