= Kayragach, Batken =

Kayragach Kyrgyz: Кайрагач
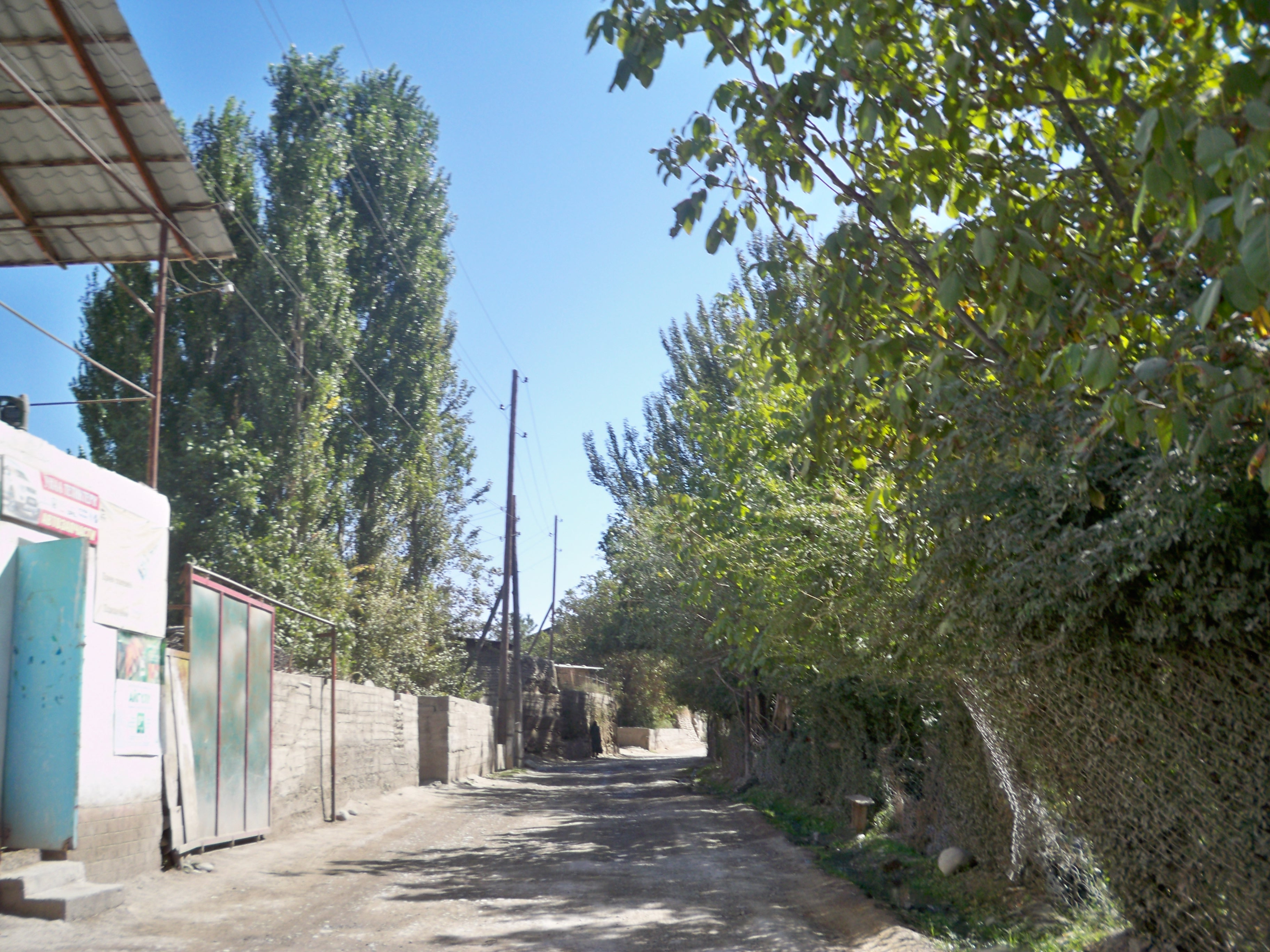

- Location within Kyrgyzstan
- Coordinates: 40°03′03″N 69°44′35″E
- Country: Kyrgyzstan
- Region: Batken
- District: Leylek

Population (2021)
  - Total: 3,006
- Time zone: UTC+6 (KGT)

Kayragach (Kyrgyz: Кайрагач) is a village in Batken Region of Kyrgyzstan. It is part of the Leylek District. Its population was 3,006 in 2021.

Nearby towns and villages include Beshkent (6 km or 4 mi) and Kulundu (10 km or 6 mi).
