= Sarkent Nature Park =

Nature reserve in Kyrgyzstan

Sarkent State Nature Park
- Kyrgyz: Саркент мамлекеттик жаратылыш паркы
- IUCN category II (national park)
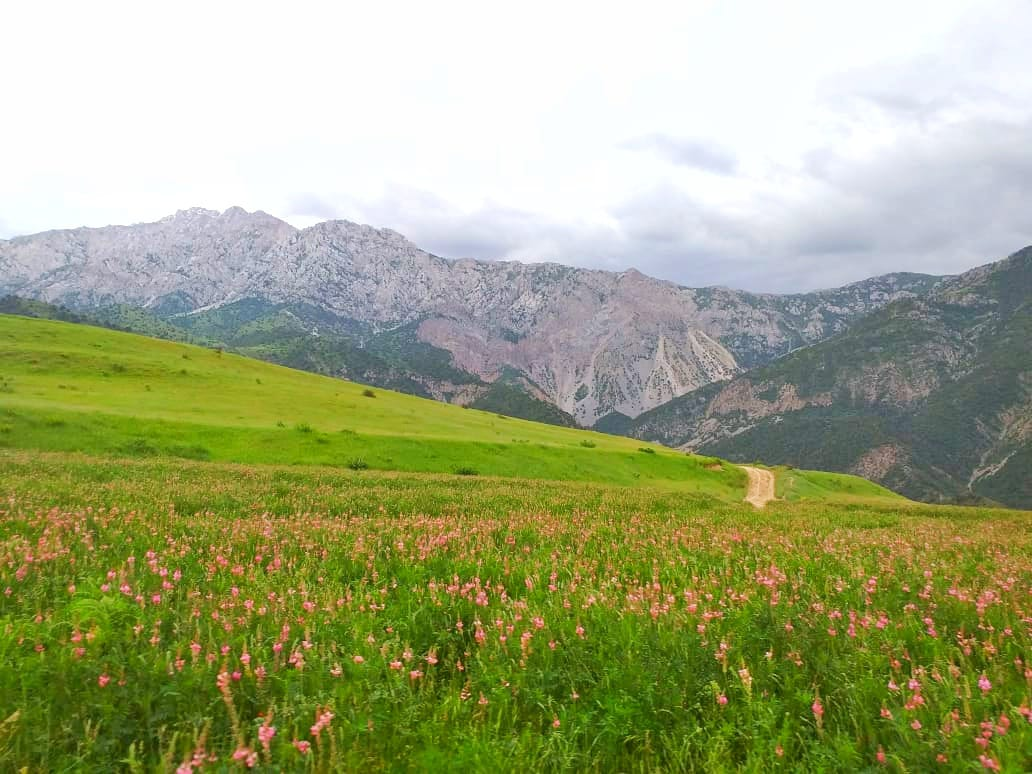

- Location within Kyrgyzstan
- Location: Leylek District, Batken Region, Kyrgyzstan
- Nearest city: Isfana
- Coordinates: 39°40′N 69°36′E
- Area: 39,999 ha (98,840 acres)
- Established: 2009
- Website: Official page

Sarkent State Nature Park (Kyrgyz: Саркент мамлекеттик жаратылыш паркы) is a national park in Leylek District of Batken Region of Kyrgyzstan established in June 2009. The purpose of the park is conservation of the unique natural complexes and biodiversity, protection of rare and endangered flora and fauna, and extension of network of specially protected areas of Kyrgyz Republic. The area of the park is 39,999 hectares. The park is located in the Turkestan Range, 42 km from the district center Isfana and in 177 km from the regional center Batken.

Rare species listed in the Red Book live here, such as the brown bear, the snow leopard, the golden eagle, the lynx, and the saker. The park is located on the very edge of Kyrgyzstan, making visitor levels low. Local authorities are trying to further develop tourism in the area.

== Area ==
Within the territory of the Sarkent State Nature Park, there are four zones:

- Strictly protected zone
- Ecological stabilization zone
- Tourism and recreation zone
- Limited economic activity zone

The total area of the nature park currently amounts to approximately 40,000 hectares including:

№	Name	Area (ha)	% of total area
1	Strictly protected zone	14,266.2	35.7
2	Ecological stabilization zone	2,378.8	5.9
3	Tourism and recreation zone	955.0	2.4
4	Limited economic activity zone	22,400.0	56.0
Total		40,000	100.0

== Hydrology ==
The hydrology of the park area in dominated by Ak-Suu (Syr Darya) river that flows into Syr Darya, and its tributaries. There are five lakes in the nature park including Aykol (located at the altitude of approximately 3,000 meters), Jashylkol, Sutkol, Boyrokkol, and Jashkol.

== Fauna ==
Surveys of the mammals inhabiting the park conducted in 2009-2016 showed occurrence of the following species.

List of mammals established in Sarkent State Nature Park in 2009-2016
English	Latin	Kyrgyz
Insectivorous	Insectiviora Bowdich, 1829	Курт-кумурска жечулор
1. Tien Shan shrew	Sorex asper (Thomas, 2014)	Тяньшань күрөң тиш чукуур
Bats	Chiroptera (Blumenbach, 1779)	Кол канаттар
2. Lesser mouse-eared bat	Myotis blythii (Tomes, 1857)	Тик кулак жарганат
3. Grey long-eared bat	Plecotus austriacus (Fisher, 1829)	Далдаң кулак
4. Common noctule	Nyctalus noctule (Schreber, 1774)	Сары жарганат
Carnivora	Carnivora Bowdich 1821	Жырткычтар
5. Wolf	Canis lupus (Linnaeus, 1758)	Карышкыр
6. Red fox	Vulpes vulpes (Linnaeus, 1758)	Кадимки түлкү
7. Brown bear	Ursus arctos (Linnaeus, 1758)	Күрөң аюу
8. Stoat	Mustela erminea (Linnaeus, 1758)	Арыс кара куйрук
9. Steppe polecat	Mustela eversmanii (Lesson, 1827)	Ач күсөн
10. Beech marten	Martes foina (Erxleben, 1777)	Суусар
11. European badger	Meles meles (Linnaeus, 1758)	Кашкулак
12. Eurasian lynx	Lynx lynx (Linnaeus, 1758)	Сүлөөсүн
13. Snow leopard	Panthera uncia (Schreber, 1775)	Илбирс
Even-toed ungulates	Artiodactyla, Owen, 1848	Ача туяктуулар
14. Wild boar	Sus scrofa (Linnaeus, 1758)	Каман
15. Roe deer	Capreolus capreolus (Linnaeus, 1758)	Элик
16. Siberian ibex	Capra sibirica (Pallas, 1776)	Сибир тоо текеси
17. Argali	Ovis ammon (Linnaeus, 1758)	Архар
Rodent	Rodentia Bowdich 1821	Кемирүүчүлөр
18. Long-tailed marmot	Marmota caudata (Geoffroy, 1844)	Кызыл суур
19. Indian crested porcupine	Hystrix indica (Kerr, 1792)	Чүткөр
Lagomorpha	Lagomorpha Brandt, 1855	Коен сымалдар
20. Tolai hare	Lepus tolai (Pallas, 1778)	Кадимки коен
21. Large-eared pika	Ochotona macrotis (Günther, 1875)	Чоң кулак коен чычкан
22. Turkestan red pika	Ochotona rutile (Severtzov, 1873)	Кызыл коен чычканы
