= Jezken =

Jezken Kyrgyz: Жезкен
- Location within Kyrgyzstan
- Coordinates: 39°51′20″N 69°20′00″E
- Country: Kyrgyzstan
- Region: Batken
- District: Leylek
- Elevation: 1,030 m (3,380 ft)

Population (2021)
  - Total: 268
- Time zone: UTC+6

Jezken (Kyrgyz: Жезкен, also Dazgon) is a village in Leylek District of Batken Region of Kyrgyzstan. It is situated along the river Ak-Suu, near the border with Tajikistan. Its population was 268 in 2021.
