= Kök-Tash, Leylek =

Kök-Tash Kyrgyz: Көк-Таш
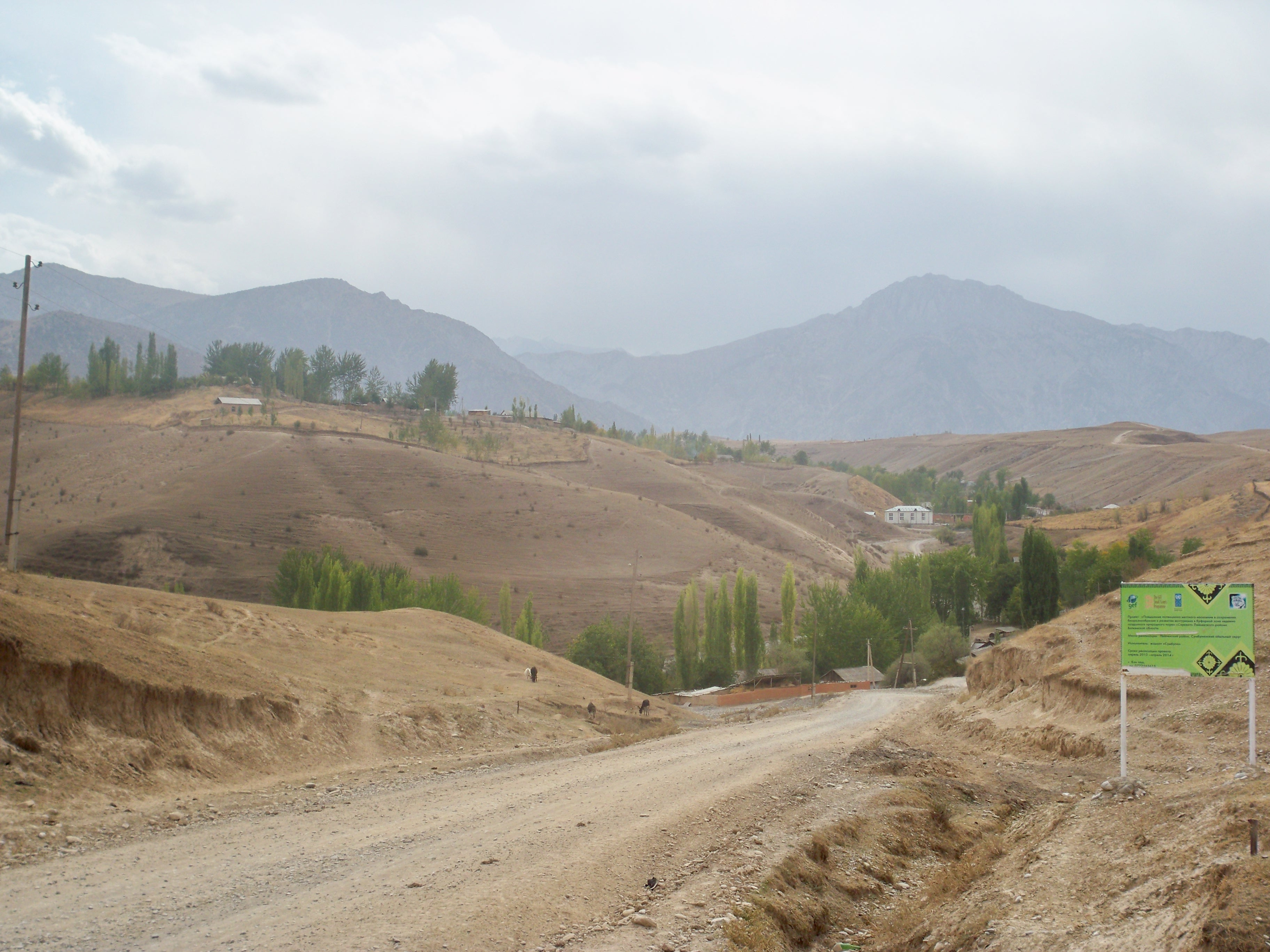

- Location within Kyrgyzstan
- Coordinates: 39°43′30″N 69°23′40″E
- Country: Kyrgyzstan
- Region: Batken
- District: Leylek

Population (2021)
  - Total: 3,957
- Time zone: UTC+6

Kök-Tash (Kyrgyz: Көк-Таш) is a village in the Batken Region of Kyrgyzstan, just east of the border with Tajikistan. It is part of the Leylek District. Its population was 3,957 in 2021.

The town of Andarak is 7 miles (12 km) to the northeast.
