= Toguz-Bulak, Leylek =

Toguz-Bulak Kyrgyz: Тогуз-Булак
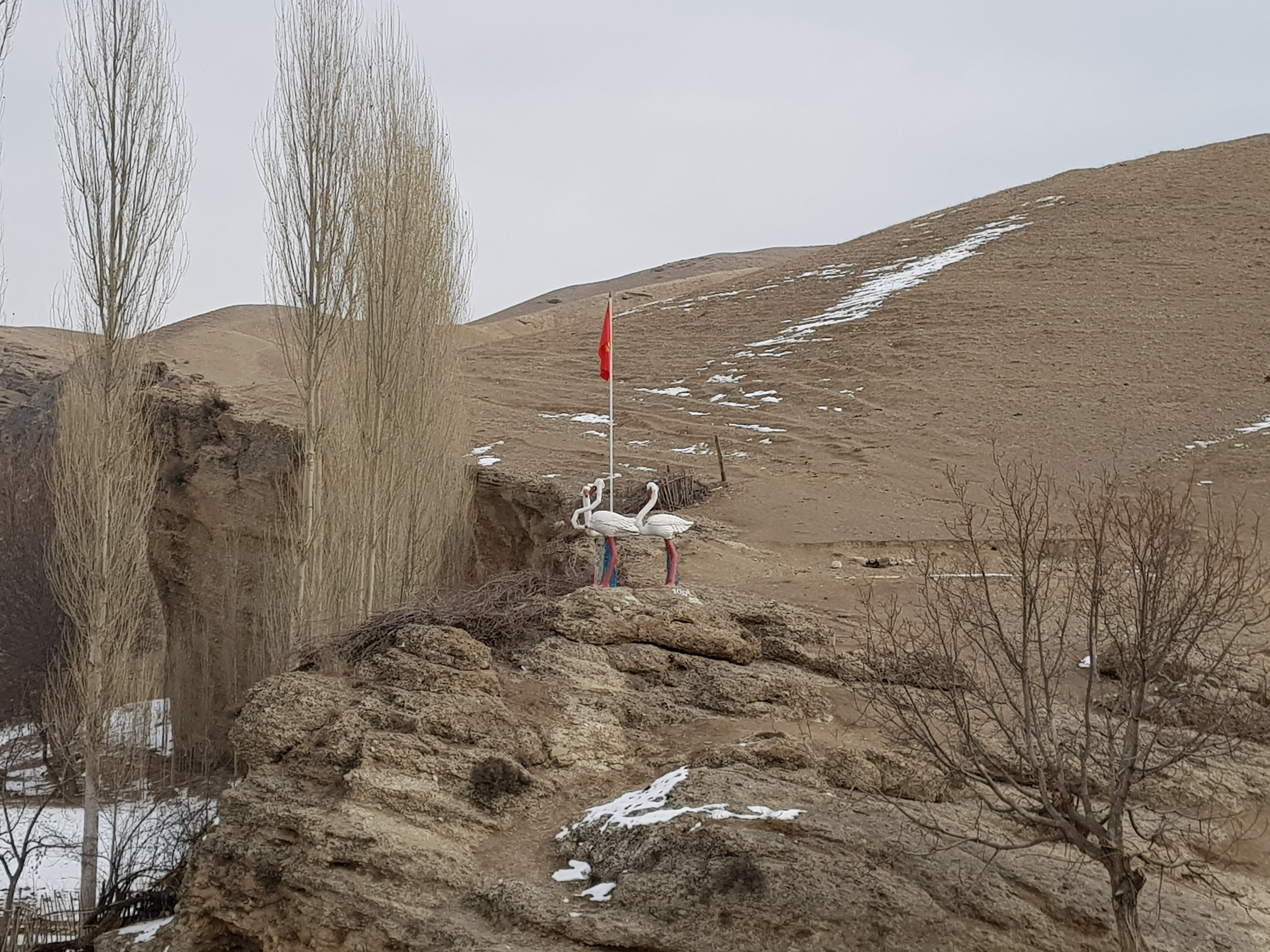

- Location within Kyrgyzstan
- Coordinates: 39°52′N 69°45′E
- Country: Kyrgyzstan
- Region: Batken
- District: Leylek
- Elevation: 1,481 m (4,859 ft)

Population (2021)
  - Total: 1,209
- Time zone: UTC+6

Toguz-Bulak (Kyrgyz: Тогуз-Булак) is a village in Batken Region of Kyrgyzstan. It is part of the Leylek District. Its population was 1,209 in 2021.

Nearby towns and villages include Vostochny (6 miles) and Isfana (12 miles).
