= Korgon =

Korgon Kyrgyz: Коргон
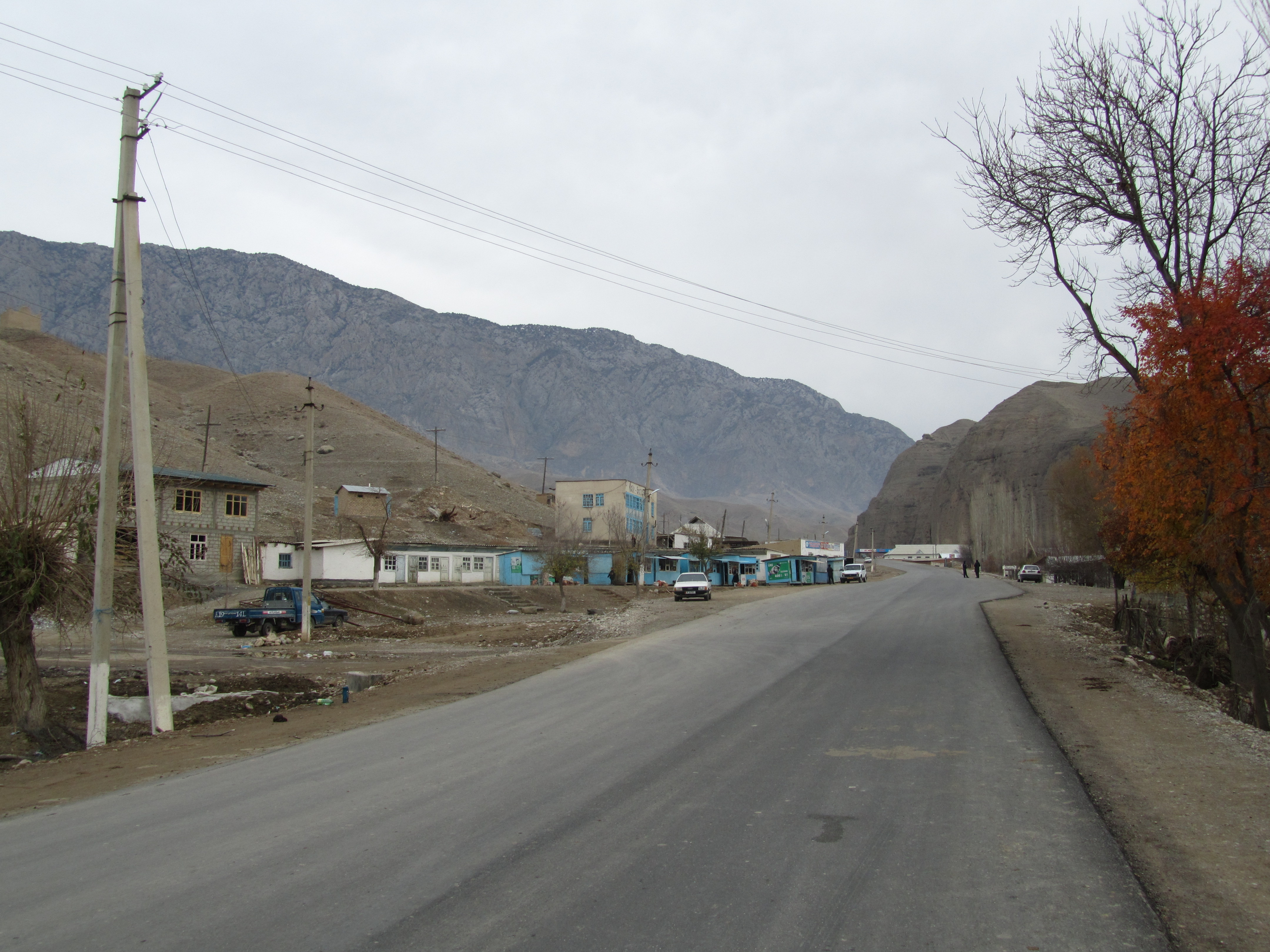

- Location within Kyrgyzstan
- Coordinates: 39°53′20″N 69°56′10″E
- Country: Kyrgyzstan
- Region: Batken
- District: Leylek
- Elevation: 1,100 m (3,600 ft)

Population (2021)
  - Total: 2,204
- Time zone: UTC+6

Korgon (Kyrgyz: Коргон) is a village in Batken Region of Kyrgyzstan. It is part of the Leylek District. Its population was 2,204 in 2021.

Nearby towns and villages include Churbek (10 km) and Katrang (8 km). There is another Korgon in the Toktogul District of Jalal-Abad Region.
