= Ravat =

Ravat Kyrgyz: Рават
- Location within Kyrgyzstan
- Coordinates: 39°52′50″N 70°10′00″E
- Country: Kyrgyzstan
- Region: Batken Region
- District: Batken District
- Elevation: 1,658 m (5,440 ft)

Population (2021)
  - Total: 2,658
- Time zone: UTC+6

Ravat (Kyrgyz: Рават, romanized: Ravat) is a village in Batken Region of Kyrgyzstan. It is part of the Batken District. Its population was 2,658 in 2021.

A nearby village is Katrang (9 miles).
