= Özgörüsh, Batken =

Özgörüsh Kyrgyz: Өзгөрүш
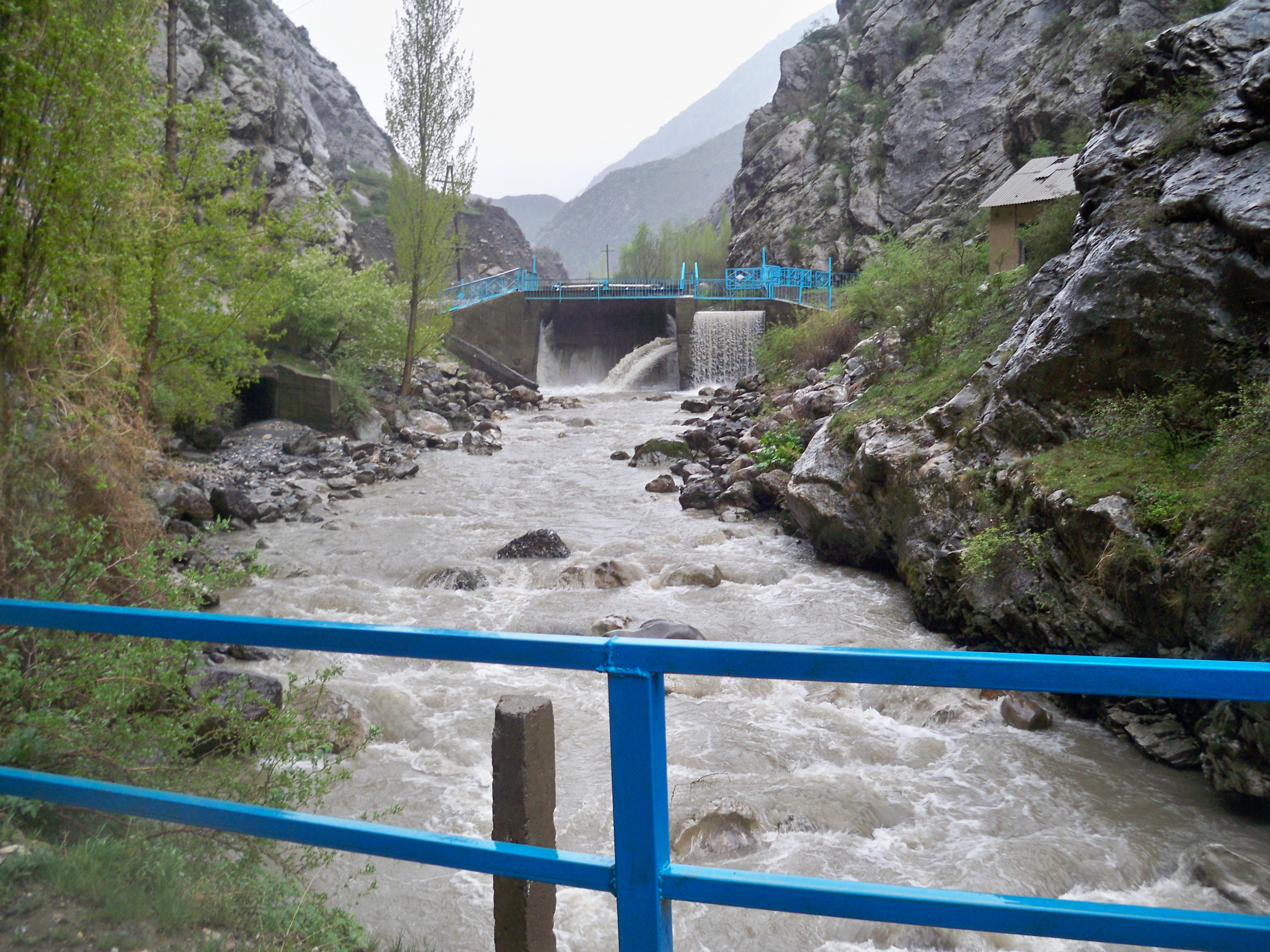

- Location within Kyrgyzstan
- Coordinates: 39°49′3″N 70°2′31″E
- Country: Kyrgyzstan
- Region: Batken
- District: Leylek

Population (2021)
  - Total: 1,209
- Time zone: UTC+6

Özgörüsh (Kyrgyz: Өзгөрүш, romanized: Özgörüsh) is a village in Batken Region of Kyrgyzstan. It is part of the Leylek District. Its population was 1,209 in 2021.
