= Borborduk, Kyrgyzstan =

Borborduk Kyrgyz: Центральное, Борбордук
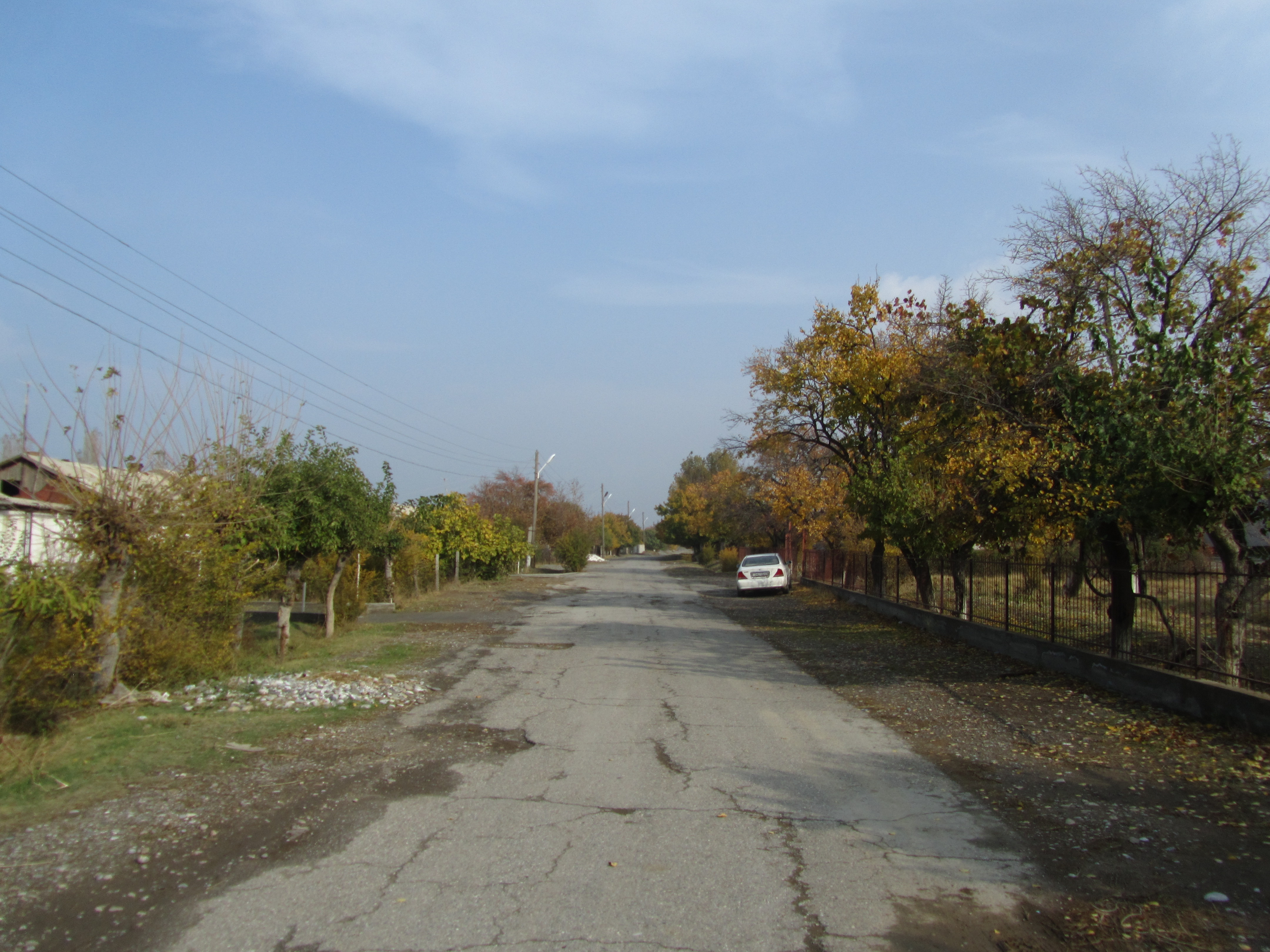

- Location within Kyrgyzstan
- Coordinates: 40°11′16.48″N 69°49′59.74″E
- Country: Kyrgyzstan
- Region: Batken
- District: Leylek
- Elevation: 1,045 m (3,428 ft)

Population (2021)
  - Total: 6,900
- Time zone: UTC+6

Borborduk (Kyrgyz: Борбордук, also known as Tsentralnoe Russian: Центральное) is a village in Batken Region of Kyrgyzstan. It is part of the Leylek District. Its population was 6,900 in 2021.

== Population ==
Historical population
Year	Pop.	±% p.a.
2009	2,506	—
2021	6,900	+8.81%
Note: resident population; Sources:

== 2022 Kyrgyzstan-Tajikistan clashes ==
In 2022 clashes between Kyrgyzstan and Tajikistan caused many casualties in Borborduk. Build-up of tension between border guards happened in the kanibadamskoye shosse highway resulted in clashes between the two forces. In September the fighting ended and has caused up to 250 casualties in the village alone.
