= Taghoyak =

Taghoyak Тагояк Тағояк
- Village and Jamoat
- Location in Tajikistan
- Coordinates: 40°07′N 69°19′E
- Country: Tajikistan
- Region: Sughd Region
- District: Spitamen District

Population (2015)
  - Total: 16,224
- Time zone: UTC+5 (TJT)
- Official languages: Russian (Interethnic); Tajik (State)

Taghoyak (Russian: Тагояк Tajik: Тағояк) is a village and jamoat in north-western Tajikistan. It is located in Spitamen District in Sughd Region. The jamoat has a total population of 16,224 (2015).
