= Bulak-Bashy, Leylek =

Bulak-Bashy Kyrgyz: Булак-Башы
- Location within Kyrgyzstan
- Coordinates: 39°59′55″N 69°34′35″E
- Country: Kyrgyzstan
- Region: Batken
- District: Leylek

Population (2021)
  - Total: 1,791

Bulak-Bashy (Kyrgyz: Булак-Башы) is a village in Batken Region of Kyrgyzstan. It is part of the Leylek District. Its population was 1,791 in 2021.
