= Khurramzamin =

- Village and Jamoat
- Location in Tajikistan
- Coordinates: 40°16′N 69°17′E
- Country: Tajikistan
- Region: Sughd Region
- District: Spitamen District

Population
  - Total: 6,246
- Time zone: UTC+5 (TJT)

Khurramzamin (Tajik: Хуррамзамин, formerly Farmonkurgon) is a village and jamoat in north-western Tajikistan. It is located in Spitamen District in Sughd Region. The jamoat has a total population of 6,246.
