= Sarband, Sughd =

Sarband
- Jamoat
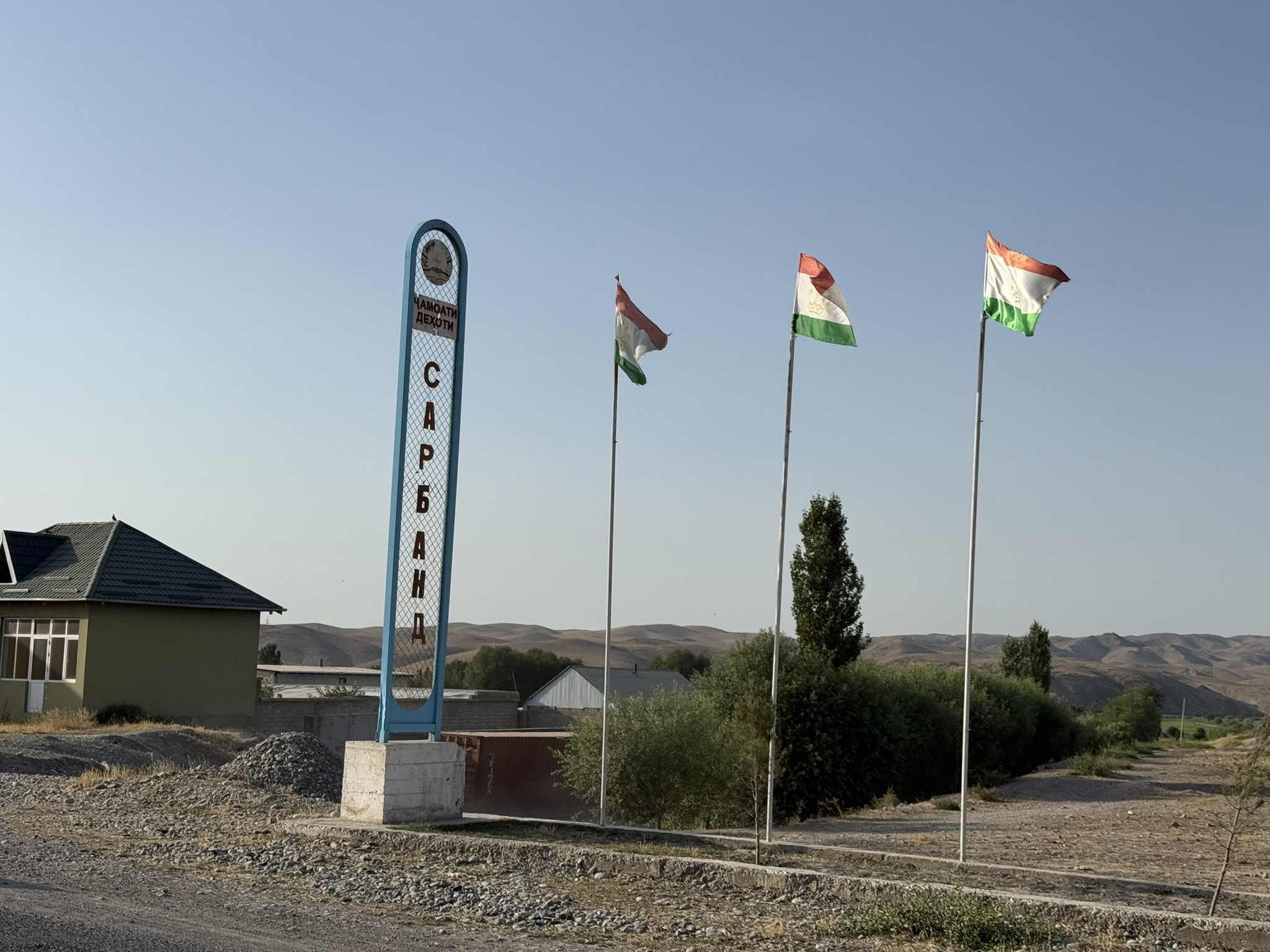
- The Sarband sign located at the eastern end of the village

- Location in Tajikistan
- Coordinates: 40°11′N 69°20′E
- Country: Tajikistan
- Region: Sughd Region
- District: Spitamen District

Population (2015)
  - Total: 8,502
- Time zone: UTC+5 (TJT)
- Official languages: Russian (Interethnic); Tajik (State) (Note: Constitution of Tajikistan)

Sarband (Russian and Tajik: Сарбанд, formerly: Kushtegirmon) is a jamoat in north-western Tajikistan. It is located in Spitamen District in Sughd Region. The jamoat has a total population of 8,502 (2015).
