= Ay-Kul =

- Айкөл (Kyrgyz)
- Location within Kyrgyzstan Location within West and Central Asia
- Coordinates: 39°38′05.3″N 69°38′06.7″E
- Lake type: Barrier lake Mountain lake
- Primary inflows: Glaciers
- Primary outflows: Ay-Kul Creek
- Basin countries: Kyrgyzstan
- Max. length: 2.2–3.5 kilometres (1.4–2.2 mi)
- Max. width: 0.5 kilometres (0.31 mi)
- Surface area: .82–1 square kilometre (0.32–0.39 sq mi)
- Water volume: 0.057 km^{3} (0.014 cu mi)
- Surface elevation: 2,838–2,938 metres (9,311–9,639 ft)

Ay-Kul (Kyrgyz: Айкөл; Uzbek: Oydinkoʻl; Russian: Ай-Кёл), also called Oydinkul, is a small freshwater landslide dam in the Turkestan Range mountains in Kyrgyzstan, near the border with Tajikistan. The lake was formed after a massive landslide blocked the flow of the Ay-Kul Creek.

Ay-Kul is located approximately 20 kilometres (12 miles) km south of Razzakov. It has a surface elevation of 2,838–2,938 m (9,311–9,639 ft) and covers an area of .82–1.5 km^{2} (0.32–0.58 sq mi). There are no paved roads leading to Ay-Kul, and the lake is a popular destination for local hikers.

== Name ==
The Kyrgyz name for the lake is Ayköl (Айкөл), meaning "moon lake". In Uzbek, it is called Oydinkoʻl, meaning "moonlit lake" or "clear lake".

Ay-Kul hosts an array of legends and myths among local Uzbeks. A popular legend holds that a shepherd lost his crook (variously described as having unique carvings or fitted with gold coins) in the lake, but months later found it in a spring in Dehmoy, Tajikistan.

== Hydrography ==
Ay-Kul was formed after several cubic km of rock dislodged from the steeply sloped river valley of Ay-Kul Creek, a tributary of the Ak-Suu River. The lake freezes in late October and thaws in March.

Sources differ on the area of Ay-Kul, putting it from .82 km^{2} (0.32 sq mi) to 1.5 km^{2} (0.58 sq mi). It has a maximum length of 2.8–3.5 km (1.7–2.2 mi) and a maximum breadth of 0.5 km (0.31 mi).
