= Kara-Bulak, Leylek =

Kara-Bulak Kyrgyz: Кара-Булак
- Location within Kyrgyzstan
- Coordinates: 39°50′46″N 69°38′46″E
- Country: Kyrgyzstan
- Region: Batken
- District: Leylek
- Elevation: 1,580 m (5,180 ft)

Population (2021)
  - Total: 2,852
- Time zone: UTC+6

Kara-Bulak (Kyrgyz: Кара-Булак) is a village in Batken Region of Kyrgyzstan. It is part of the Leylek District. Its population was 2,852 in 2021.
