= Ak-Suu, Leylek =

Ak-Suu Kyrgyz: Ак-Суу
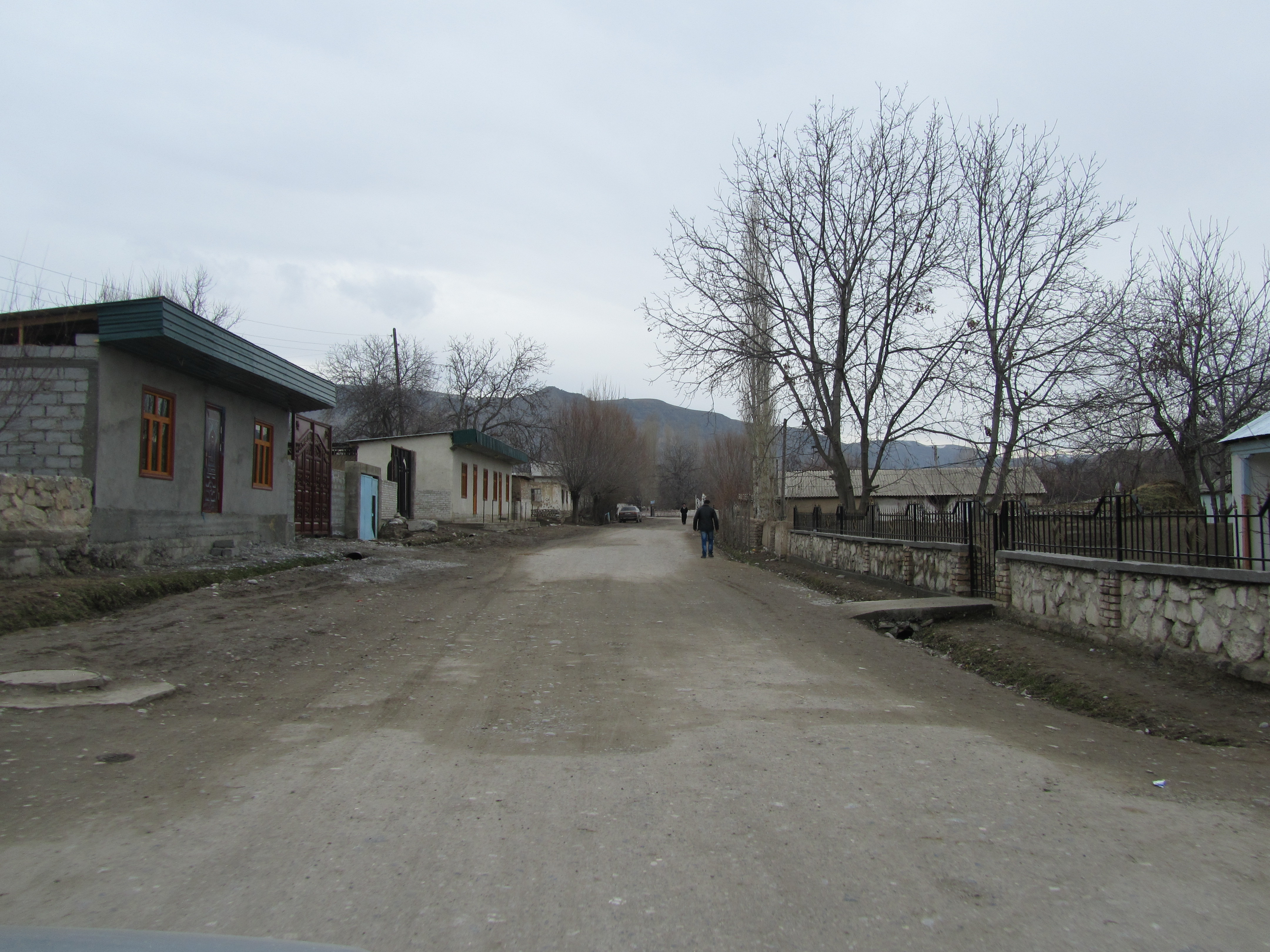

- Location within Kyrgyzstan
- Coordinates: 39°53′45″N 69°22′10″E
- Country: Kyrgyzstan
- Region: Batken
- District: Leylek
- Elevation: 940 m (3,080 ft)

Population (2021)
  - Total: 3,672
- Time zone: UTC+6

Ak-Suu (Kyrgyz: Ак-Суу) is a village in Leylek District of Batken Region of Kyrgyzstan. It is situated along the river Ak-Suu. Its population was 3,672 in 2021.
