= Tursun Uljaboev =

Tursun Uljaboev Russian: Турсун Улябоев Tajik: Турсун Ӯлҷабоев
- Jamoat
- Location in Tajikistan
- Coordinates: 40°07′N 69°24′E
- Country: Tajikistan
- Region: Sughd Region
- District: Spitamen District

Population (2015)
  - Total: 16,874
- Time zone: UTC+5 (TJT)
- Official languages: Russian (Interethnic); Tajik (State)

Tursun Uljaboev (Russian: Турсун Улябоев; Tajik: Турсун Ӯлҷабоев, formerly Nov) is a jamoat in north-western Tajikistan. It is located in Spitamen District in Sughd Region. The jamoat has a total population of 16,874 (2015). It consists of 4 villages, including Andarsoy.
