= Kurush, Tajikistan =

Kurush
- Jamoat
- Location in Tajikistan
- Coordinates: 40°08′N 69°15′E
- Country: Tajikistan
- Region: Sughd Region
- District: Spitamen District

Population (2015)
  - Total: 26,469
- Time zone: UTC+5 (TJT)

Kurush (Tajik: Куруш, formerly: Kurkat) is a jamoat in north-western Tajikistan. It is identified with the ancient town Cyropolis that was founded by the Persian king Cyrus the Great, not least due to the closeness of its former name Kurkat with the Iranian *Kuru(š)-kaθa-, lit. “the (reinforced) settlement of Kuruš/Cyrus”. It is located in Spitamen District in Sughd Region. The jamoat has a total population of 30,469 (2019).
