= Uch-Bulak =

Uch-Bulak Kyrgyz: Үч-Булак
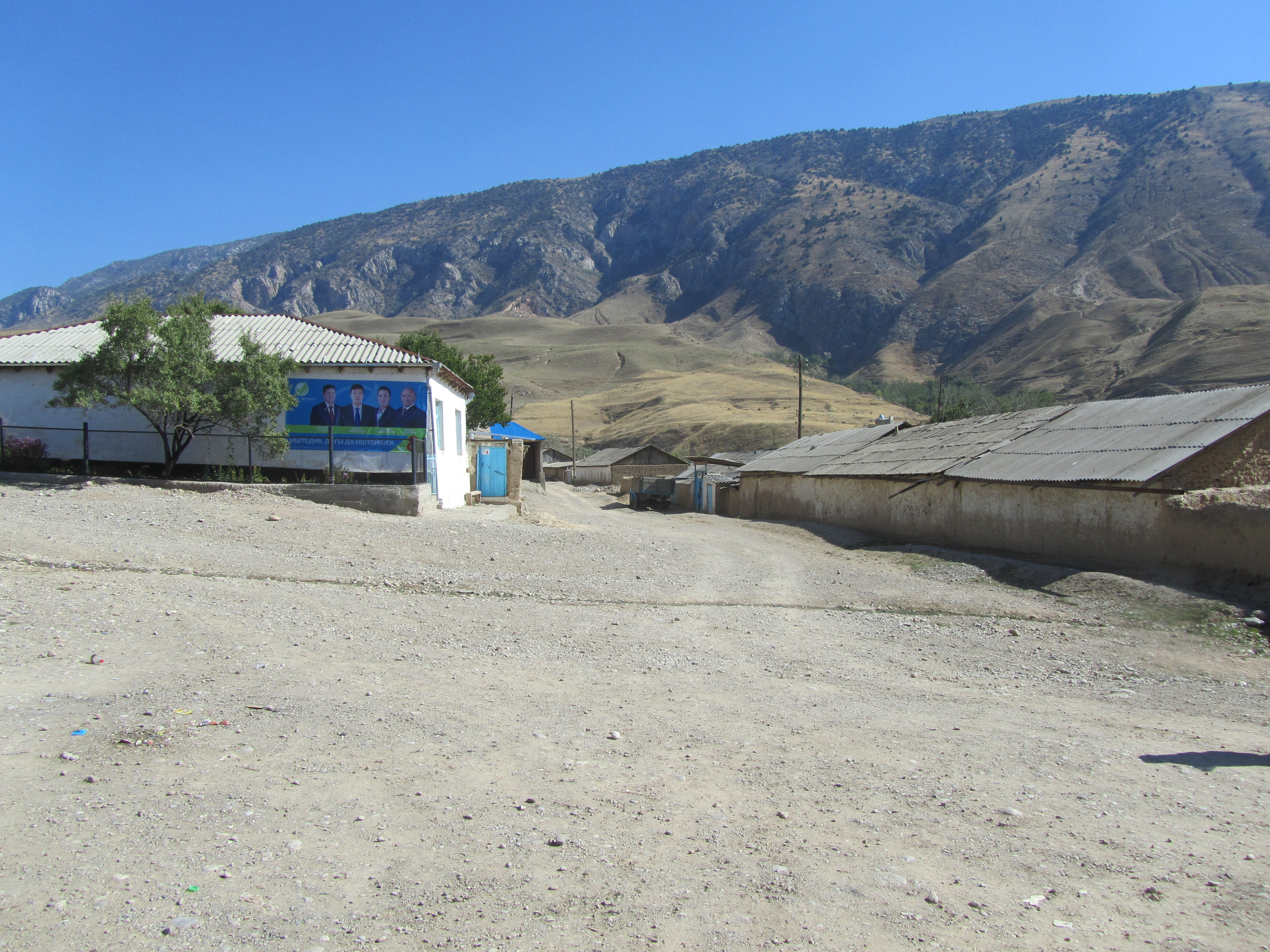

- Location within Kyrgyzstan
- Coordinates: 39°58′48″N 69°54′00″E
- Country: Kyrgyzstan
- Region: Batken
- District: Leylek
- Elevation: 1,215 m (3,986 ft)

Population (2021)
  - Total: 1,085
- Time zone: UTC+6

Uch-Bulak (Kyrgyz: Үч-Булак) previously known as Churbek (Kyrgyz: Чурбек) is a village in the Batken Region of Kyrgyzstan. It is part of the Leylek District. Its population was 1,085 in 2021.

Nearby towns and villages include Katrang (11 miles) and Muras (4 miles).
