= Sülüktü =

Sülüktü Сүлүктү Sulukta
- Town
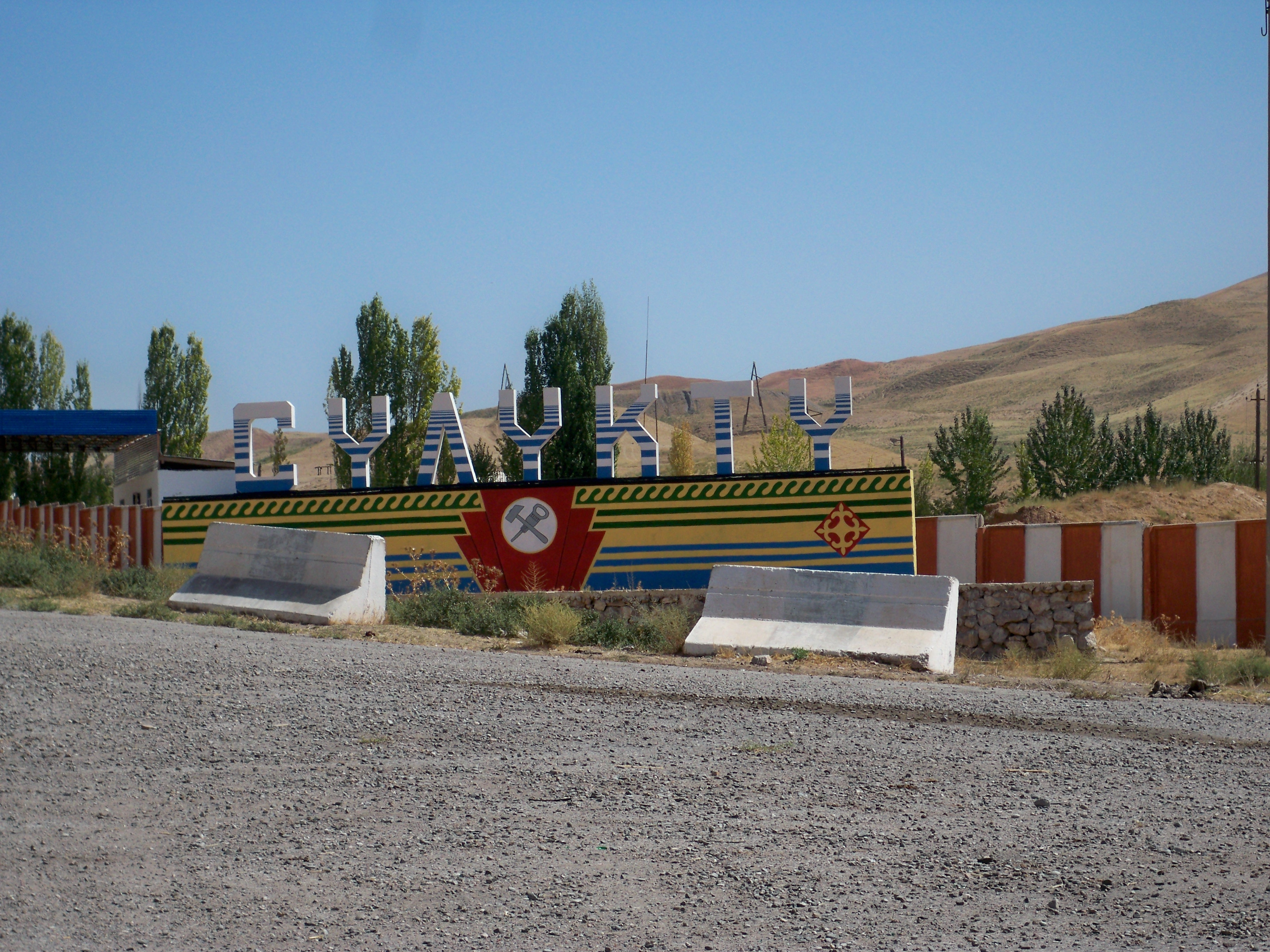
- The sign in the western corner of Sülüktü

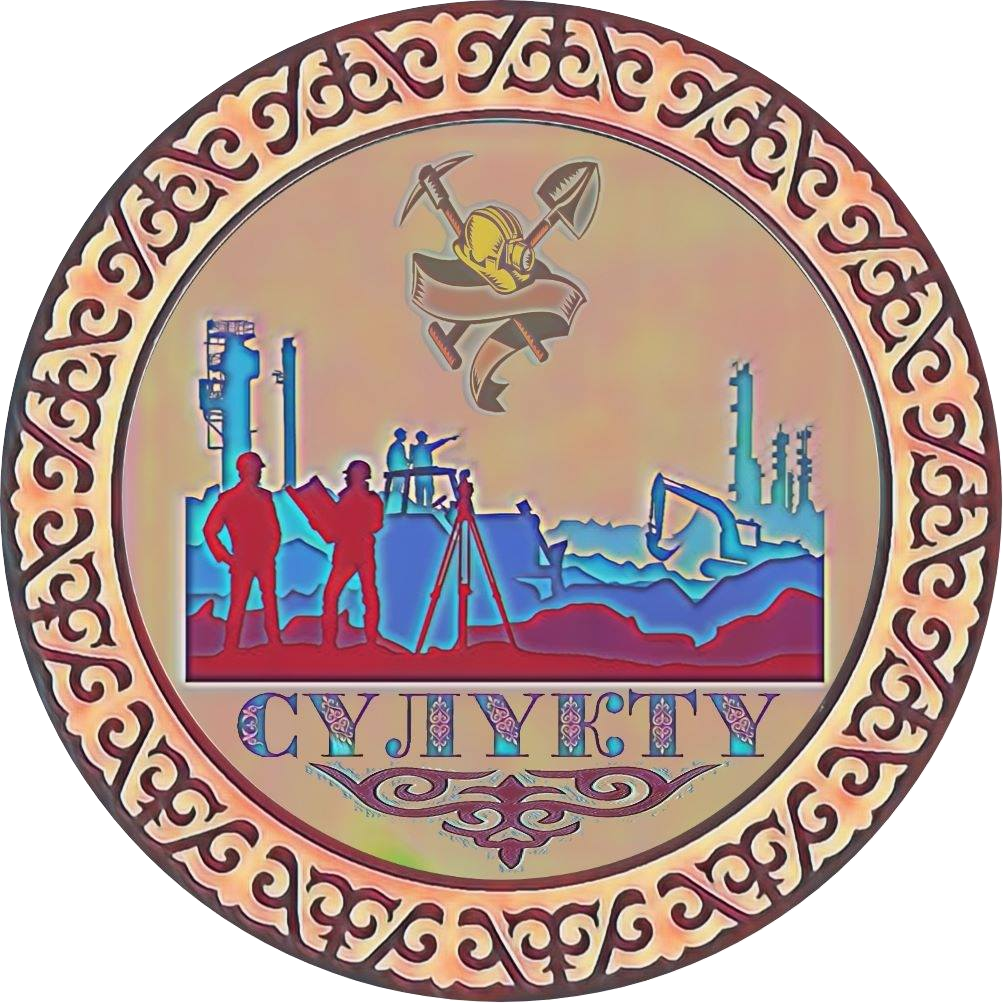
- Seal

- Location in Kyrgyzstan
- Coordinates: 39°56′24″N 69°33′36″E
- Country: Kyrgyzstan
- Region: Batken
- Founded: 1868
- City status: 1940

Government
  - Mayor: Abduzakir Ibragimov

Area
  - Total: 18 km^{2} (6.9 sq mi)
- Elevation: 1,380 m (4,530 ft)

Population (2021)
  - Total: 24,238
  - Density: 1,300/km^{2} (3,500/sq mi)
- Time zone: UTC+6
- Postal code: 720500
- Area code: +996 3653
- Website: www.suluktu.gov.kg

Sülüktü, also spelled Sulukta or Suliukta (Kyrgyz: Сүлүктү; Uzbek: Sulukta / Сулукта; Russian: Сулюкта, romanized: Sulyukta) is a town located at the extreme western end of Batken Region in southern Kyrgyzstan. Sülüktü is situated at the southern fringe of the Fergana Valley in a region surrounded on three sides by Tajikistan.

The word "sülüktü" is believed to have come from the Turkic word "suluk" or "zuluk" which means a "leech". According to this view, the waters of present-day Sülüktü had leeches and therefore people called the place "suluktu" which literally means "containing leeches." Sülüktü is one of Central Asia's oldest coal extraction sites. The first industrial coal mine of Sülüktü was opened in 1868. Sülüktü was made into a town in 1940. Sülüktü is the first town in Kyrgyzstan where Soviet rule was established.

Sülüktü is directly subordinated to Batken Region. In other words, it is not part of any district. The urban-type settlement of Vostochny and the village of Koltso are also governed by the Sülüktü Town Council. In 2021 the population of Sülüktü itself was 14,770 and the combined population of Sülüktü and the subordinated villages was 24,238. Its area is 18 square kilometres (6.9 sq mi).

There were several large coal mines and factories in Sülüktü during Soviet times. Following the collapse of the USSR, the majority of these factories were abandoned. A lack of professionals and machinery, mismanagement, and falling income levels — all contributed to this downfall. While Sülüktü was once an important industrial center, nowadays it gives the impression of an abandoned town.

== History ==
Sülüktü is one of Central Asia's oldest coal extraction sites. The first industrial coal mine of Sülüktü was opened in 1868. Sülüktü was made into a town in 1940. Sülüktü is the first town in Kyrgyzstan where Soviet rule was established.

Sülüktü was an important industrial town in the Soviet Union. The town had several large coal mines. In addition to coal, deposits of gypsum, quartz sand, and limestone were also extracted. Sülüktü was also home to a meat processing and packaging factory, a creamery, a brick factory, and several clothing factories. After the dissolution of the USSR, the majority of ethnic Russians and Tatars living in Sülüktü left the town. There were many experienced workers among those who left. In the 1990s, almost all of the factories in Sülüktü were closed down as a result of a lack professionals, disruption of Soviet trade routes, ageing machinery, and mismanagement.

== Geography ==
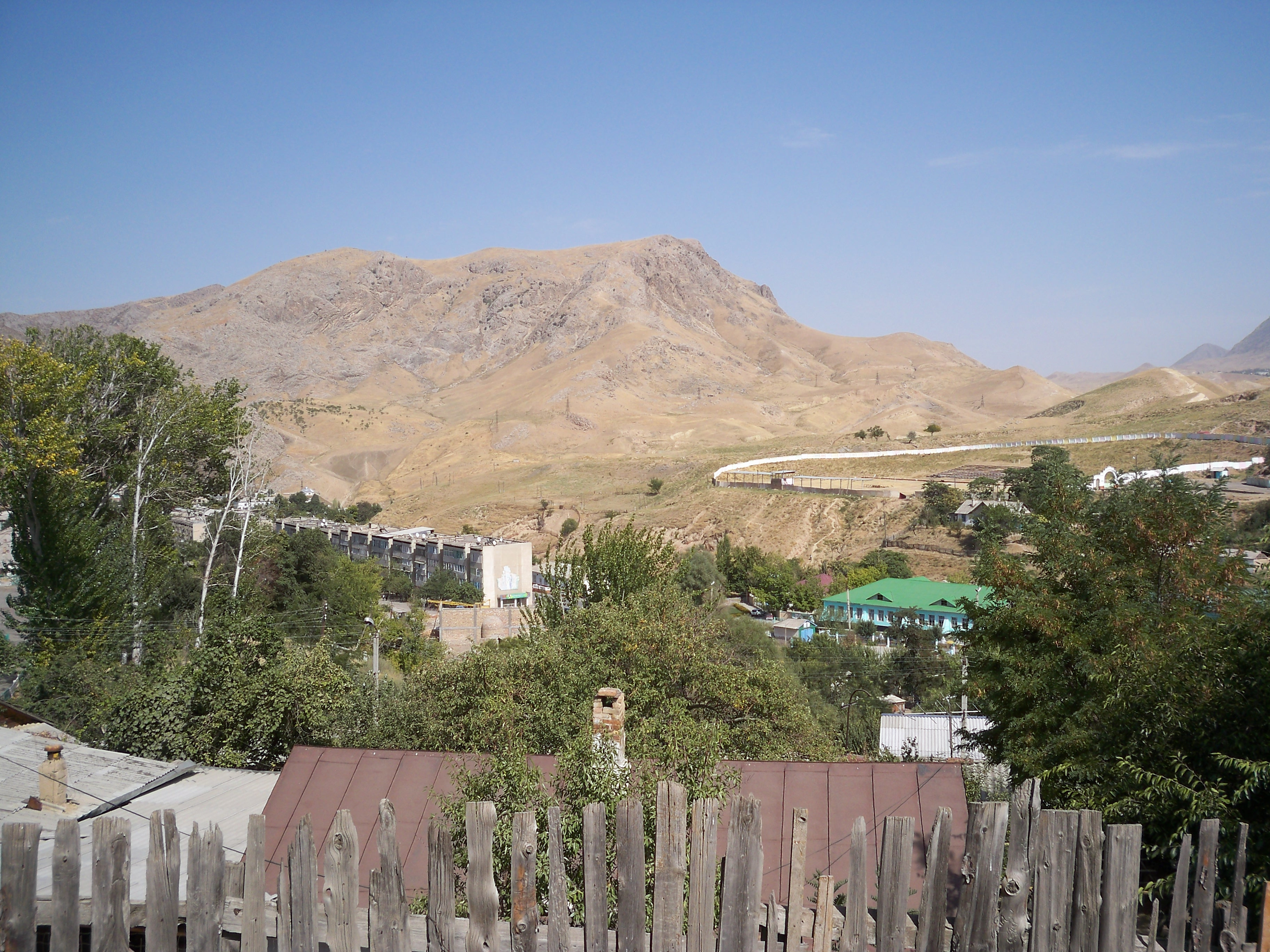
Sülüktü's hills

Sülüktü is located in the western part of Batken Region at an altitude of 1,380 meters above sea level. The town lies to the north of the mountains of the Turkestan Range. The landscape of Sülüktü consists of hills and low mountains.

=== Climate ===
Sülüktü has a cold desert climate (Köppen climate classification BWk) with sharp continental influences. The city has cold winters and hot summers. The winter period is not long. The spring and fall see some rainfall, while the summers are hot and dry. The climate of Sülüktü is similar to the climate of Isfana. However, Sülüktü gets less precipitation than Isfana.

Climate data for Sülüktü
Month	Jan	Feb	Mar	Apr	May	Jun	Jul	Aug	Sep	Oct	Nov	Dec	Year
Mean daily maximum °C (°F)	4 (39)	6 (43)	13 (55)	22 (72)	28 (82)	34 (93)	36 (97)	33 (91)	29 (84)	20 (68)	15 (59)	5 (41)	20 (69)
Mean daily minimum °C (°F)	−2 (28)	−1 (30)	4 (39)	11 (52)	15 (59)	20 (68)	21 (70)	19 (66)	14 (57)	8 (46)	4 (39)	0 (32)	9 (49)
Average precipitation mm (inches)	18 (0.7)	24 (0.9)	24 (0.9)	24 (0.9)	18 (0.7)	9 (0.4)	3 (0.1)	6 (0.2)	3 (0.1)	27 (1.1)	15 (0.6)	30 (1.2)	201 (7.8)

== Demographics ==
=== Population ===
Historical population
Year	Pop.	±% p.a.
1970	18,483	—
1979	19,030	+0.32%
1989	22,159	+1.53%
1999	21,219	−0.43%
2009	20,725	−0.24%
2021	24,238	+1.31%
Note: resident population; Sources:

Representatives of many ethnic groups can be found in the town. According to official data, the Kyrgyz are the largest ethnic group. According to the 2009 Census, the ethnic make-up of Sülüktü and the subordinated villages is as follows: 73.2 percent are Kyrgyz, 19.5 percent are Uzbek, 3.6 percent are Tatar, 2.6 percent are Russian, 0.7 percent are Tajik, and the rest 0.4 percent are representatives of various other ethnic groups.

Sülüktü has traditionally been Muslim. The residents of the town are Sunni Muslims. There are 15 mosques and one Orthodox church in Sülüktü.

As of 2021, the populations of Sülüktü and the subordinated villages are as follows:

Settlement	Population
Sülüktü	14,770
Vostochny	8,611
Koltso	712

== Economy ==
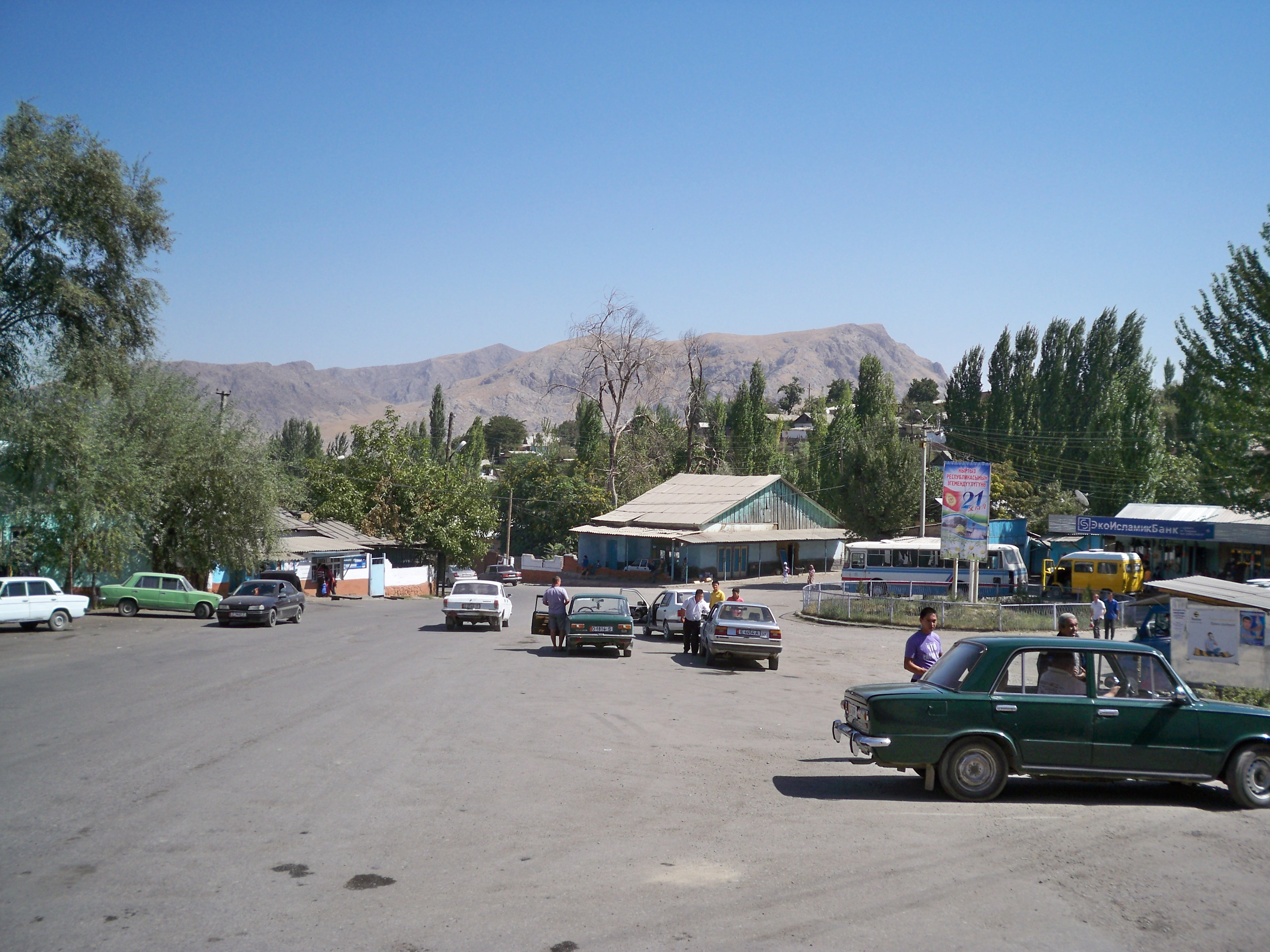
One of the main streets of Sülüktü

A large number of the residents of Sülüktü are migrant workers in Russia. Suluktans also go to the neighboring countries of Kazakhstan and Tajikistan to make a living. There are no reliable data on the number of labor migrants from Sülüktü.

Those who stay in the town engage mostly in trade. Sülüktü does not have a large bazaar. However, there are several small markets. The town's sellers bring their goods from markets in Osh, Kara-Suu, and Khujand.

The economy of Sülüktü, like the economy of many Kyrgyzstani towns, is primarily kiosk in nature. A large amount of local commerce occurs at the bazaars and small kiosks located all over the town. A significant amount of trade is unregulated.

=== Coal mining ===
Sülüktü is one of the oldest centers of coal mining in Central Asia. Coal has been extracted in these areas since the 10th or 11th century. Geological investigations into the coal deposits of Sülüktü were conducted for the first time in 1903. According to Soviet geologists, the deposits of coal in Sülüktü date back to the Paleozoic, Mesozoic, and Cenozoic eras.

The overall thickness of the coal beds in Sülüktü ranges from 35 to 120 meters. In some places, there are coal beds of commercial value 600–750 meters below ground level. The thickness of the main coal seam is 0,1–18 meters and it stretches for about 22 kilometers.

The deposits of coal in Sülüktü mainly consist of lignite or brown coal. From a petrographic point of view, the coal of Sülüktü contains fusain and clarain. Historically, Sülüktü's coal was extracted using both surface and underground mining methods. Currently, it is extracted using only the underground mining method, as there is no longer any surface mining equipment in the town. Private mines have replaced almost all of the large-scale, state-owned mines of the Soviet period.

== Government ==
Sülüktü has a mayor–council form of government. The mayor is elected at large in general elections. The Town Kenesh (Council) has 19 members. The urban-type settlement of Vostochny and the village of Koltso are also governed by the Sülüktü Town Council. The current mayor of Sülüktü is Abduzakir Ibragimov.

Sülüktü is directly subordinated to Batken Region. In other words, it is not part of any district. Like in other Kyrgyzstani settlements where there are large groups of ethnic minorities, virtually all administrative positions in Sülüktü are held by ethnic Kyrgyz. There are very few representatives of other ethnicities among town officials.

== Education ==
=== Schools ===
Sülüktü has many educational institutions. There are nine secondary schools in the town. One of them is a lyceum and another is a gymnasium school. In Sülüktü's schools students are taught in Kyrgyz, Uzbek, and Russian. The students must learn Kyrgyz and Russian, the two official languages of Kyrgyzstan. English is taught as a foreign language at all of the schools in Sülüktü, but the quality of English teaching tends to be poor. Thus, in Sülüktü Uzbek schoolchildren learn four languages and Kyrgyz schoolchildren learn three languages.

=== Colleges and universities ===
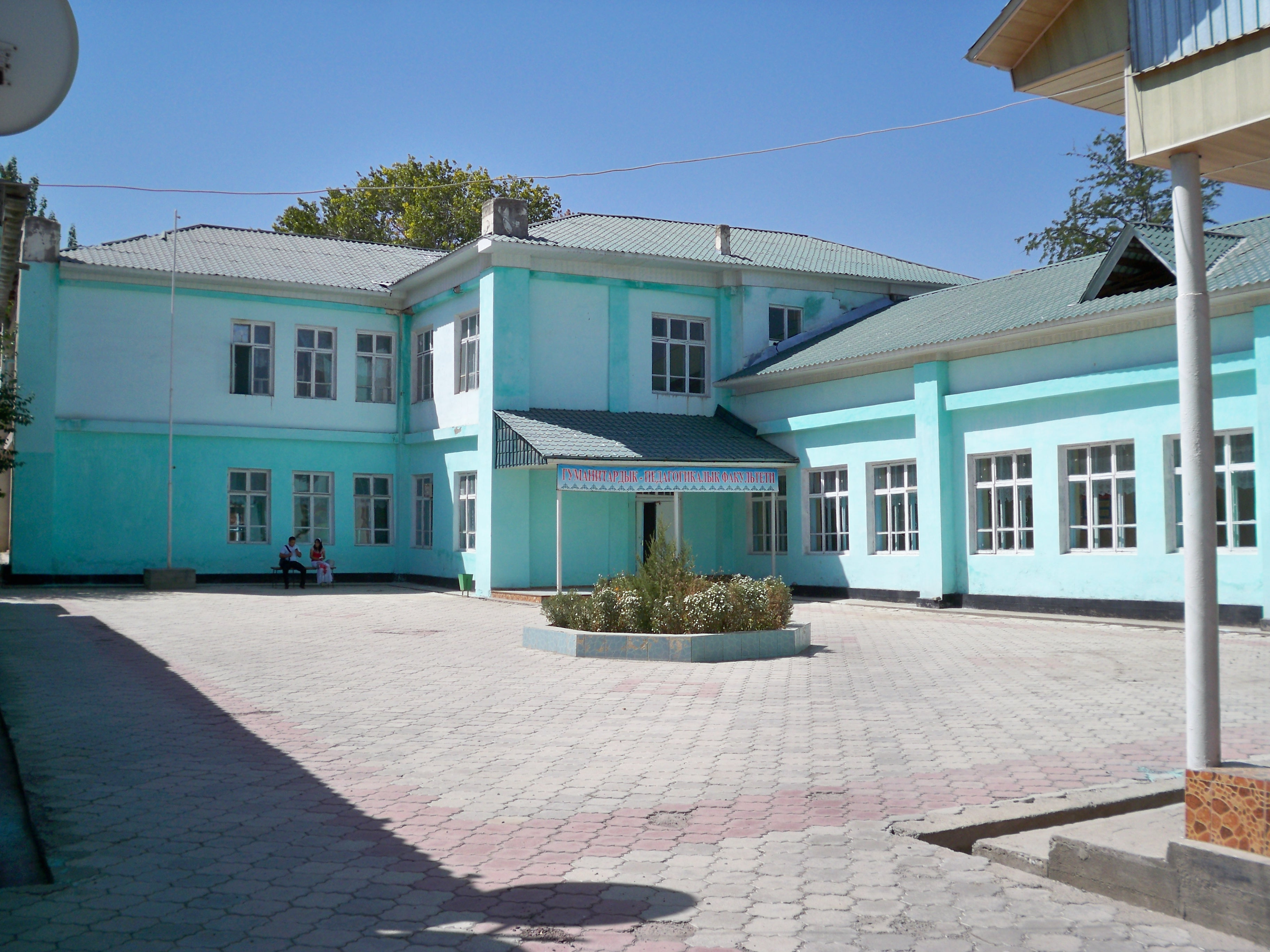
Sülüktü Institute of Humanities and Economics

Sülüktü is home to three institutes of higher education. The largest of these is the Sülüktü Institute of Humanities and Economics, SIHE (Russian: Сулюктинский гуманитарно-экономический институт, СГЭИ). This institute is a branch of the Batken State University, BSU (Russian: Баткенский Государственный Университет, БатГУ). In addition, Sülüktü is home to the Sülüktü Engineering and Economics School (Russian: Сулюктинский инженерно-экономический центр Баткенского Государственного Университета) and Sülüktü Pedagogical College (Russian: Сулюктинское педагогическое училище Баткенского Государственного Университета), both of which are branches of the BSU.

Sülüktü is also home to Vocational School No. 73 which trains seamstresses, carpenters, electricians, and drivers.

== Culture ==
There are two libraries in Sülüktü, a general library and a children's library. Both of these libraries are public libraries. The children's library has two buildings, one in the town itself and another in the urban-type settlement of Vostochny. While the general library has 55,138 items, the children's library has 88,016 items.

The town has a children's music school which was opened in 1936. At the music school, children can learn to sing, dance, and play various musical instruments. There is a branch of the music school in Vostochny.

Sülüktü has only one park. Near the park is a soccer stadium which can hold up to 5,000 people. Sülüktü also has a town recreation center. The current building of the center was built in 1932.

There is a summer camp called "The Mountain Eagle" 35 kilometers from Sülüktü in the gorge of the Beles mountain massif. The camp was opened in 1965. It was rehabilitated in 2004. The camp can serve up to 500 children in one cohort.

== Transportation ==
There was a narrow gauge railway connection between Sülüktü and the Tajikistani city of Khojand (formerly called Leninobod) in Soviet times. After Kyrgyzstan became independent, the line was closed. Sülüktü has no airport. The nearest airport is in the nearby town of Isfana, which is 16 kilometers from Sülüktü. Automobile roads connect Sülüktü with populated places in Leylek District. The distance between Sülüktü and the capital Bishkek is 950 km.
