= Kulundu =

Kulundu Kyrgyz: Кулунду
- Location within Kyrgyzstan
- Coordinates: 40°06′25″N 69°38′35″E
- Country: Kyrgyzstan
- Region: Batken
- District: Leylek
- Elevation: 640 m (2,100 ft)

Population (2021)
  - Total: 10,170
- Time zone: UTC+6

Kulundu (Kyrgyz: Кулунду) is a village in the Batken Region of Kyrgyzstan. It is part of the Leylek District. Its population was 8,250 in 2021.

== Population ==
Historical population
Year	Pop.	±% p.a.
2009	8,250	—
2021	10,170	+1.76%
Note: resident population; Sources:
