= Istiqlol, Spitamen =

Istiqlol
- Village and Jamoat
- Location in Tajikistan
- Coordinates: 40°11′N 69°25′E
- Country: Tajikistan
- Region: Sughd Region
- District: Spitamen District

Population (2015)
  - Total: 18,015
- Time zone: UTC+5 (TJT)

Istiqlol (Tajik: Истиқлол, formerly: Oqteppa) is a village and jamoat in north-western Tajikistan. It is located in Spitamen District in Sughd Region. The jamoat has a total population of 18,015 (2015).
