= Aktyube, Jetisu Region =

Aktyube Ақтөбе
- Village
- Location in Kazakhstan Aktyube (Asia)
- Coordinates: 45°14′0″N 79°40′0″E
- Country: Kazakhstan
- Region: Jetisu Region
- District: Aksu District

Population (2009)
  - Total: 125
- Time zone: UTC+6 (Omsk Time)

Aktyube (Kazakh: Ақтөбе, Aqtöbe) is a village in Jetisu Region of south-eastern Kazakhstan.
