= Vostochny, Kyrgyzstan =

Vostochnyy Восточный
- Location within Kyrgyzstan
- Coordinates: 39°55′20″N 69°39′00″E
- Country: Kyrgyzstan
- Region: Batken Region
- City: Sülüktü
- Elevation: 1,909 m (6,263 ft)

Population (2021)
  - Total: 8,611
- Time zone: UTC+6

Vostochny (Kyrgyz: Восточный) is an urban-type settlement in Batken Region of Kyrgyzstan. The settlement is governed by the town council of Sülüktü. Its population was 8,611 in 2021.

== Population ==
Historical population
Year	Pop.	±% p.a.
1970	1,758	—
1979	3,566	+8.18%
1989	6,592	+6.34%
1999	6,898	+0.45%
2009	6,632	−0.39%
2021	8,611	+2.20%
Note: resident population; Sources:
