= Andarak =

Andarak Kyrgyz: Андарак
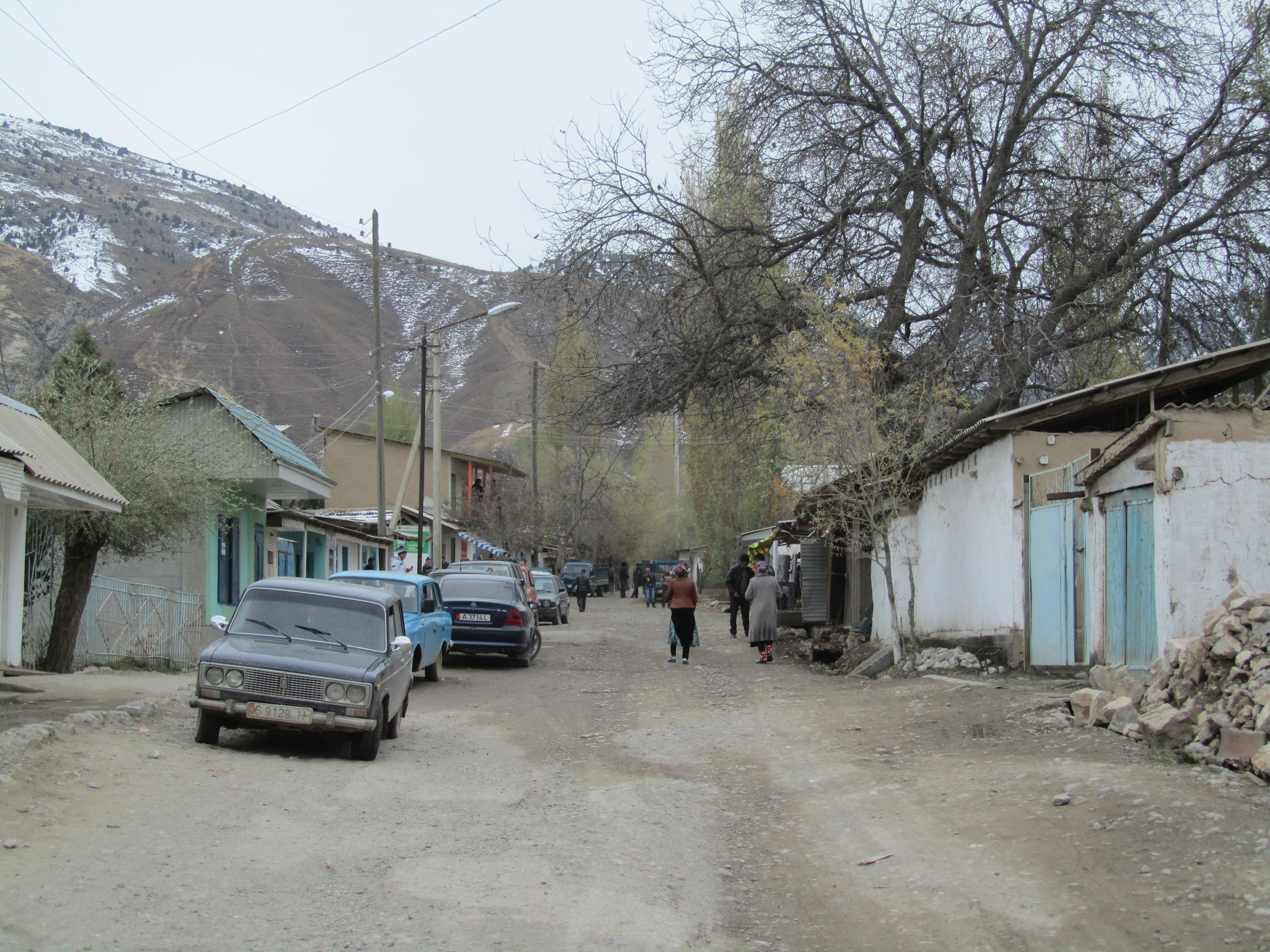

- Location within Kyrgyzstan
- Coordinates: 39°45′0″N 69°27′36″E
- Country: Kyrgyzstan
- Region: Batken
- District: Leylek
- Elevation: 1,799 m (5,902 ft)

Population (2021)
  - Total: 8,001
- Time zone: UTC+6

Andarak (Kyrgyz: Андарак) is a village in Batken Region of Kyrgyzstan. It is part of the Leylek District. The town of Isfana is 9 km to the northeast of Andarak. Its population was 8,001 in 2021.

== Population ==
Historical population
| Year | Pop. | ±% p.a. |
|---|---|---|
| 2009 | 5,997 | — |
| 2021 | 8,001 | +2.43% |
Note: resident population; Sources:
