= Aktyube, Astrakhan Oblast =

Aktyube Актюбе
- Selo
- Location within Astrakhan Oblast Location within Russia
- Coordinates: 46°24′N 48°26′E
- Country: Russia
- Region: Astrakhan Oblast
- District: Volodarsky District
- Time zone: UTC+4:00

Aktyube (Russian: Актюбе) is a rural locality (a selo) in Aktyubinsky Selsoviet of Volodarsky District, Astrakhan Oblast, Russia. The population was 92 as of 2010. There are 7 streets.

== Geography ==
It is located on the Kushumbet River, 9 km (5.6 mi) west of Volodarsky (the district's administrative centre) by road. Kostyube is the nearest rural locality.
