= Beshkent, Kyrgyzstan =

Beshkent Kyrgyz: Бешкент
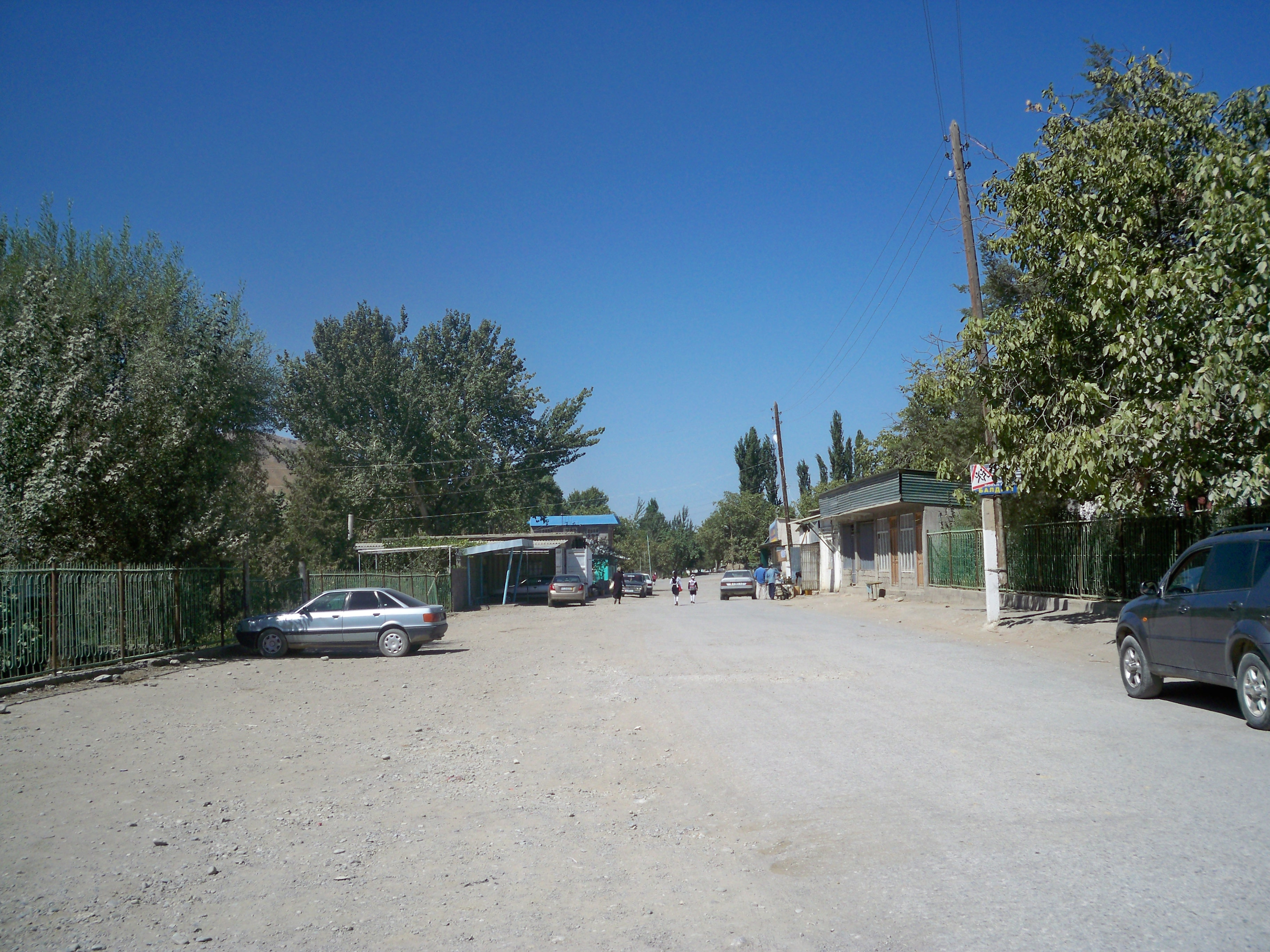

- Location within Kyrgyzstan
- Coordinates: 40°1′49″N 69°49′06″E
- Country: Kyrgyzstan
- Region: Batken
- District: Leylek
- Elevation: 785 m (2,575 ft)

Population (2021)
  - Total: 4,474

Beshkent (Kyrgyz: Бешкент) is a village in the Batken Region of Kyrgyzstan. It is part of the Leylek District. Its population was 4,474 in 2021.
