= Navkat =

Navkat Russian: Нау/Навкат Tajik: Навкат
- Town
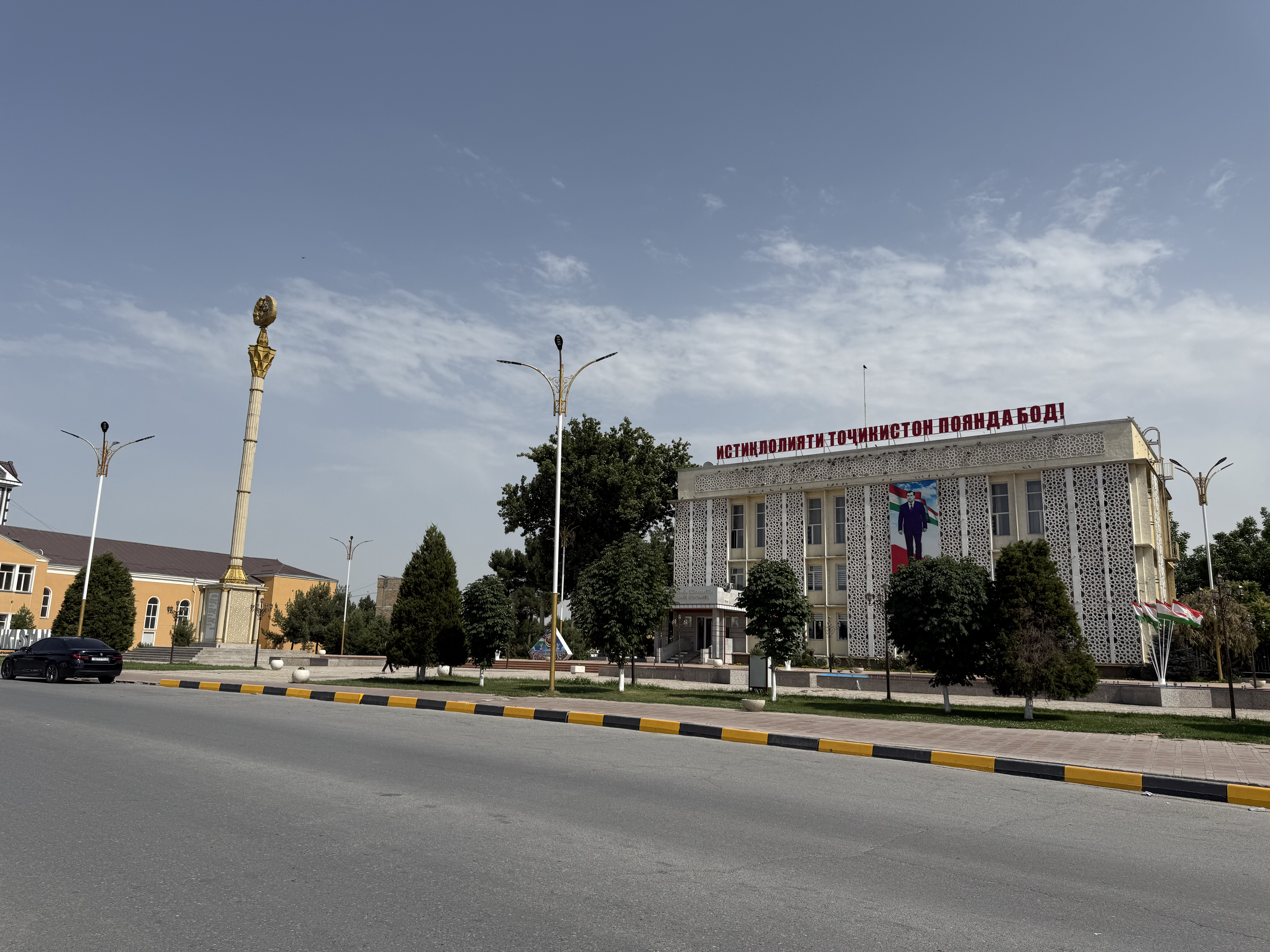
- Lenin Street, one of the main streets in Navkat

- Location in Tajikistan
- Coordinates: 40°08′59″N 69°22′12″E
- Country: Tajikistan
- Region: Sughd Region
- District: Spitamen

Population (1 January 2020)
  - Total: 18,700

Navkat (Russian: Нау/Навкат; Tajik: Навкат, formerly: Nau or Nov) is a town in Tajikistan located in Sughd Region south-west of Khujand. It is the administrative capital of Spitamen District with a population of 18,700 (1 January 2020 est.).
