= Katrang =

Katrang Kyrgyz: Катраң
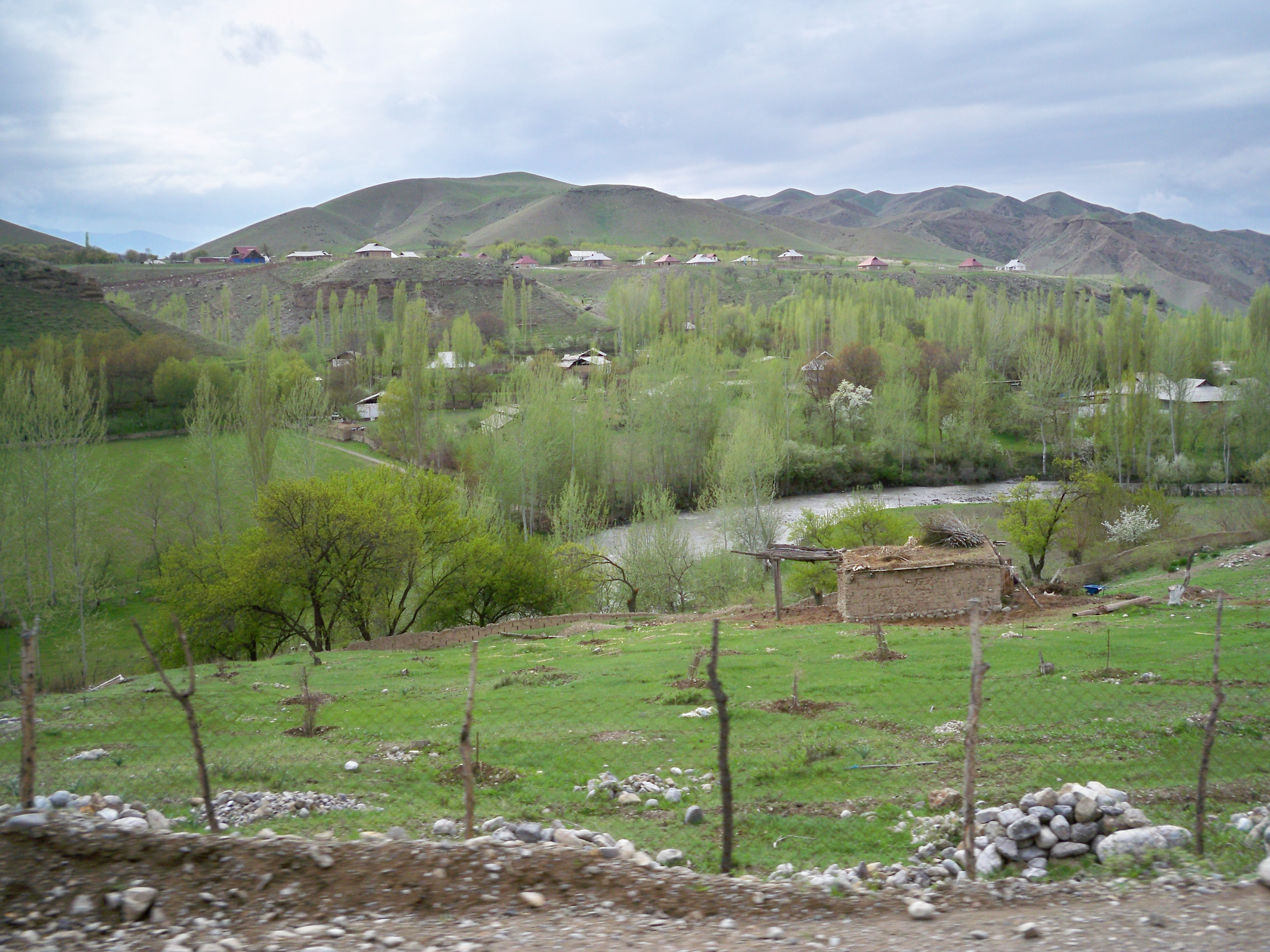

- Location within Kyrgyzstan
- Coordinates: 39°50′33″N 70°00′40″E
- Country: Kyrgyzstan
- Region: Batken
- District: Leylek
- Elevation: 1,225 m (4,019 ft)

Population (2021)
  - Total: 7,149
- Time zone: UTC+6

Katrang (Kyrgyz: Катраң) is a village in Leylek District of Batken Region of Kyrgyzstan. Its population was 7,149 in 2021. A nearby village is Ravat (9 miles).

== Population ==
Historical population
Year	Pop.	±% p.a.
2009	5,095	—
2021	7,149	+2.86%
Note: resident population; Sources:
