= Leylek District =

District in Batken Region, Kyrgyzstan

Coordinates: 39°50′N 69°31′E

Leylek Kyrgyz: Лейлек району
- District
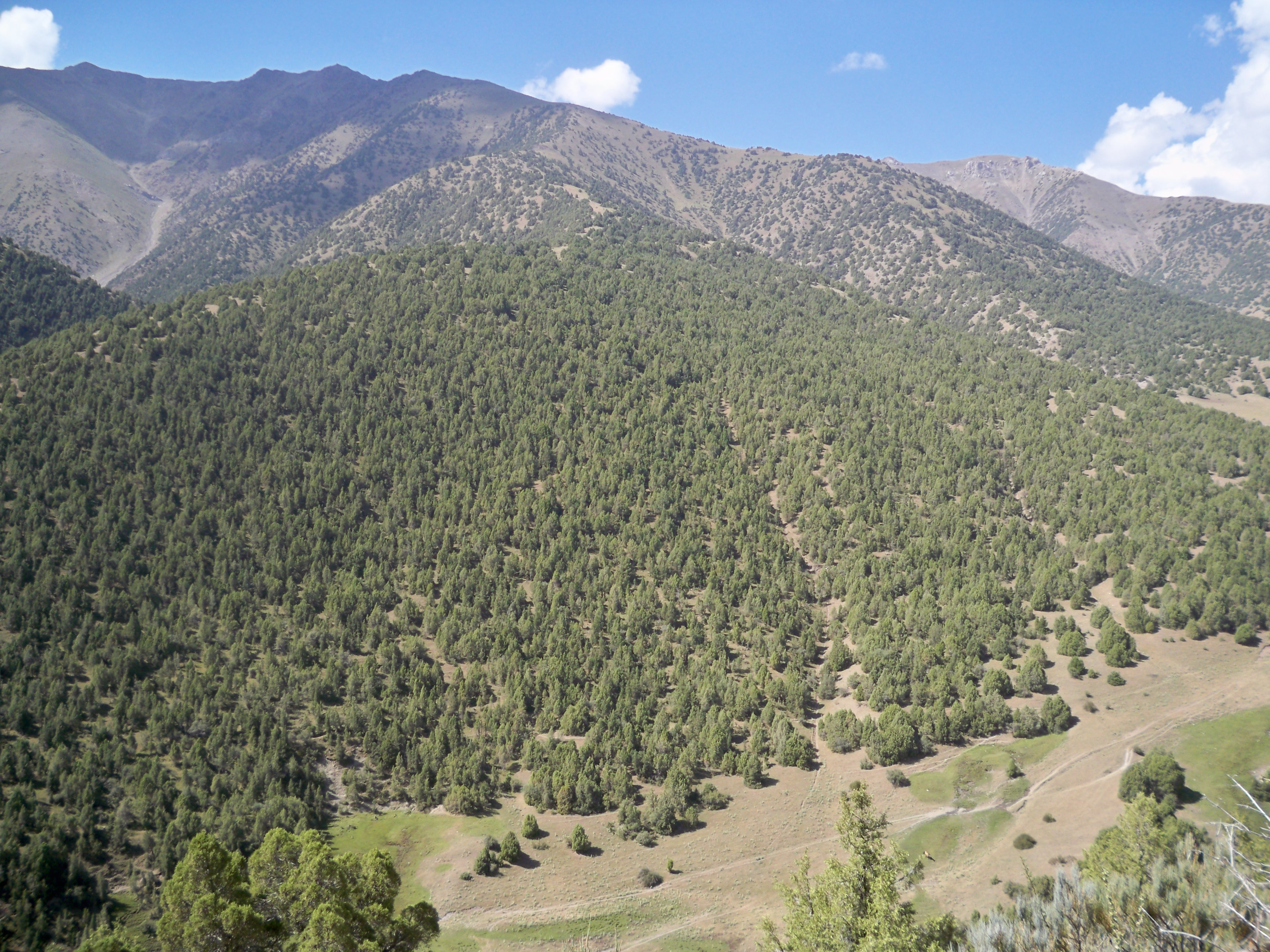
- Mountains south of Razzaqov

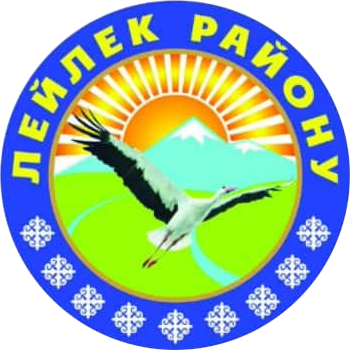
- Coat of arms

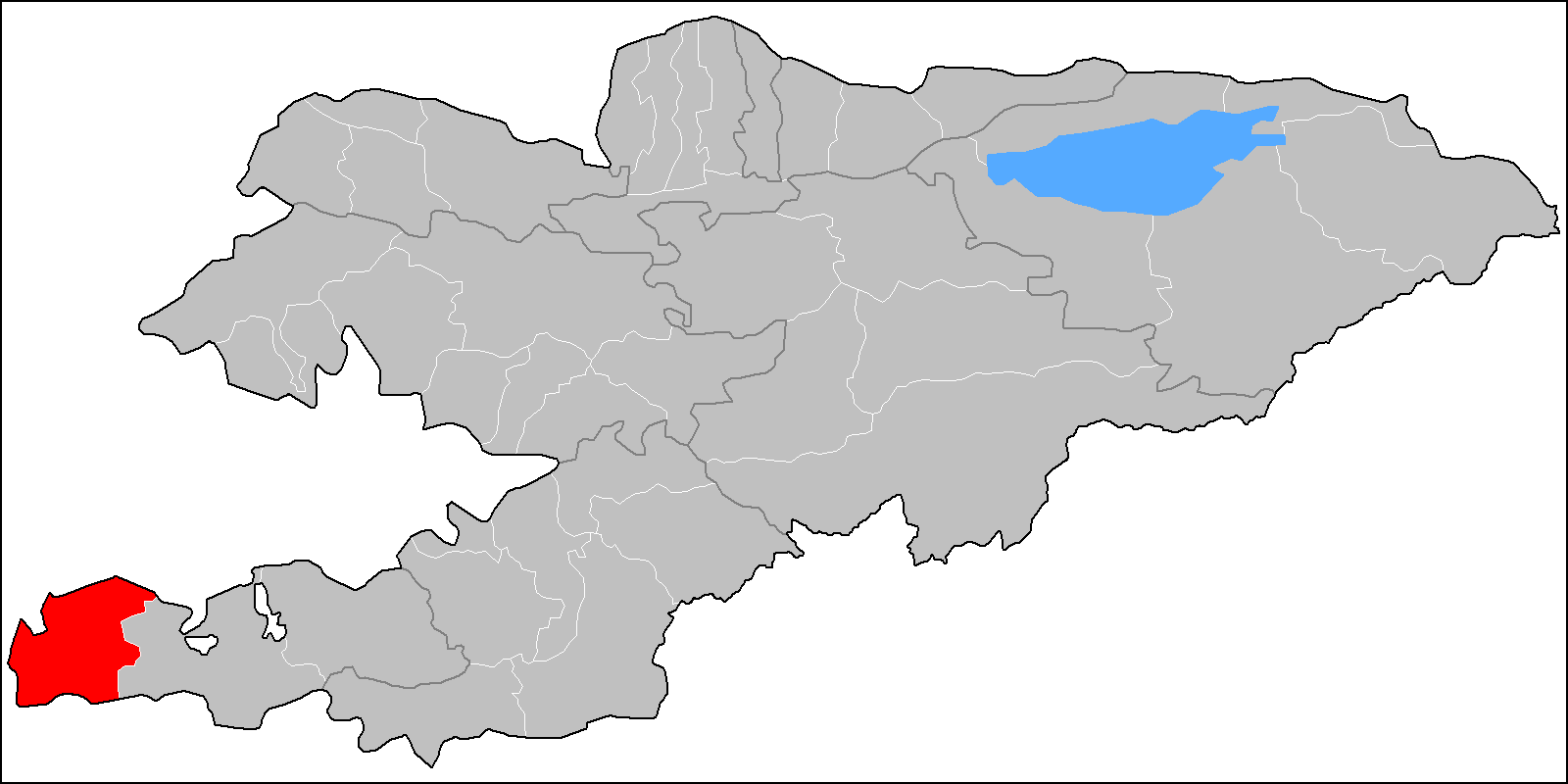
- Location of Leylek District in Kyrgyzstan
- Country: Kyrgyzstan
- Region: Batken Region
- Administrative centre: Razzaqov

Area
  - Total: 4,653 km^{2} (1,797 sq mi)

Population (2022)
  - Total: 149,089
  - Density: 32.04/km^{2} (82.99/sq mi)
- Time zone: UTC+6 (KGT)

Leylek District (Kyrgyz: Лейлек району, romanized: Leylek rayonu) is a district of Batken Region in south-western Kyrgyzstan. It borders Batken District to the east and Tajikistan to the north, west, and south. Its administrative centre is Razzaqov. The district covers 4,653 square kilometres (1,797 sq mi) and had a resident population of 149,089 at the 2022 census.

== Geography ==
Leylek District is located between the northern slopes of the Turkestan Range and the Ferghana Valley. It contains the lowest point of Kyrgyzstan: 401 meters above sea level.

== Population ==
Historical population
| Year | Pop. | ±% p.a. |
|---|---|---|
| 1970 | 40,280 | — |
| 1979 | 51,615 | +2.79% |
| 1989 | 74,531 | +3.74% |
| 1999 | 100,285 | +3.01% |
| 2009 | 116,861 | +1.54% |
| 2021 | 146,020 | +1.87% |
Note: resident population; Sources:

== Towns, rural communities and villages ==
According to the 2025 SOATE classification, Leylek District comprises the town of Razzaqov and 43 villages grouped into seven rural communities (Kyrgyz: айыл аймагы, romanized: ayyl aymagy).

The former villages of Altyn-Beshik, Samat, Chymken, Taylan, Ak-Bosogo, and Ak-Bulak have been incorporated into Razzaqov.

The rural communities and their constituent villages are:

1. Ak-Suu (seat: Ak-Suu; also includes Alga, Jengish, Suu-Bashy, and Jezken).
2. Keng-Talaa (seat: Beshkent; also includes Karl Marks, Kayragach, 50 Years of the USSR, Eski-Oochu, Muras, Uch-Bulak, Jeti-Tash, and Kerege-Tash).
3. Jangy-Jer (seat: Borborдук; also includes Arka, Dostuk, and Jashtyk).
4. Leylek (seat: Katrang; also includes Korgon, Kara-Suu, Leylek, Chuyanchy, Ak-Terek, Jangy-Turmush, and Özgörüsh).
5. Kulundu (seat: Kulundu; also includes Bulak-Bashy, Internatsionalnoye, Kommunizm, Lenin, and Maksat).
6. Sumbula (seat: Andarak; also includes Iskra, Kök-Tash, and Sary-Dobo).
7. Toguz-Bulak (seat: Ming-Jygach; also includes Toguz-Bulak, Ay-Kol, Kara-Bulak, Aybike, Archa-Beshik, and Bozogul).

Sülüktü is a town of regional significance administered separately from Leylek District.
