= Spitamen District =

Spitamen District Russian: Спитаменский район Tajik: Ноҳияи Спитамен
- District
- Location of Spitamen District in Tajikistan
- Coordinates: 40°09′N 69°22′E
- Country: Tajikistan
- Region: Sughd Region
- Capital: Navkat

Area
  - Total: 400 km^{2} (150 sq mi)

Population (2020)
  - Total: 141,600
  - Density: 350/km^{2} (920/sq mi)
- Time zone: UTC+5 (TJT)
- Official languages: Russian (Interethnic); Tajik (State)

Spitamen District (Russian: Спитаменский район; Tajik: Ноҳияи Спитамен) is a district in north-central Sughd, Tajikistan, stretching across the province's narrow part from the border with Uzbekistan to the border with Kyrgyzstan. Population 141,600 (2020 est.). Formerly called Nau District (Russian: Науский район) or Nov District (Tajik: Nohiya-i Nov, Ноҳияи Нов; Persian: ناحیۀ ناو), it was renamed Spitamen district by a resolution of parliament in November 2003. The district capital is Navkat, located south-west of Khujand.

The district is named after Spitamen who led the Sogdians in a revolt against the forces of Alexander the Great in 329-328 BCE.

== Administrative divisions ==
The district has an area of about 400 km^{2} (200 sq mi) and is divided administratively into one town and six jamoats. They are as follows:

Jamoat	Population (Jan. 2015)
Navkat (town)	16,900
Istiqlol	18,015
Khurramzamin	
Kurush	26,469
Sarband	8,502
Tagoyak	16,224
Tursun Uljaboev	16,874
