= Leylek District Library =

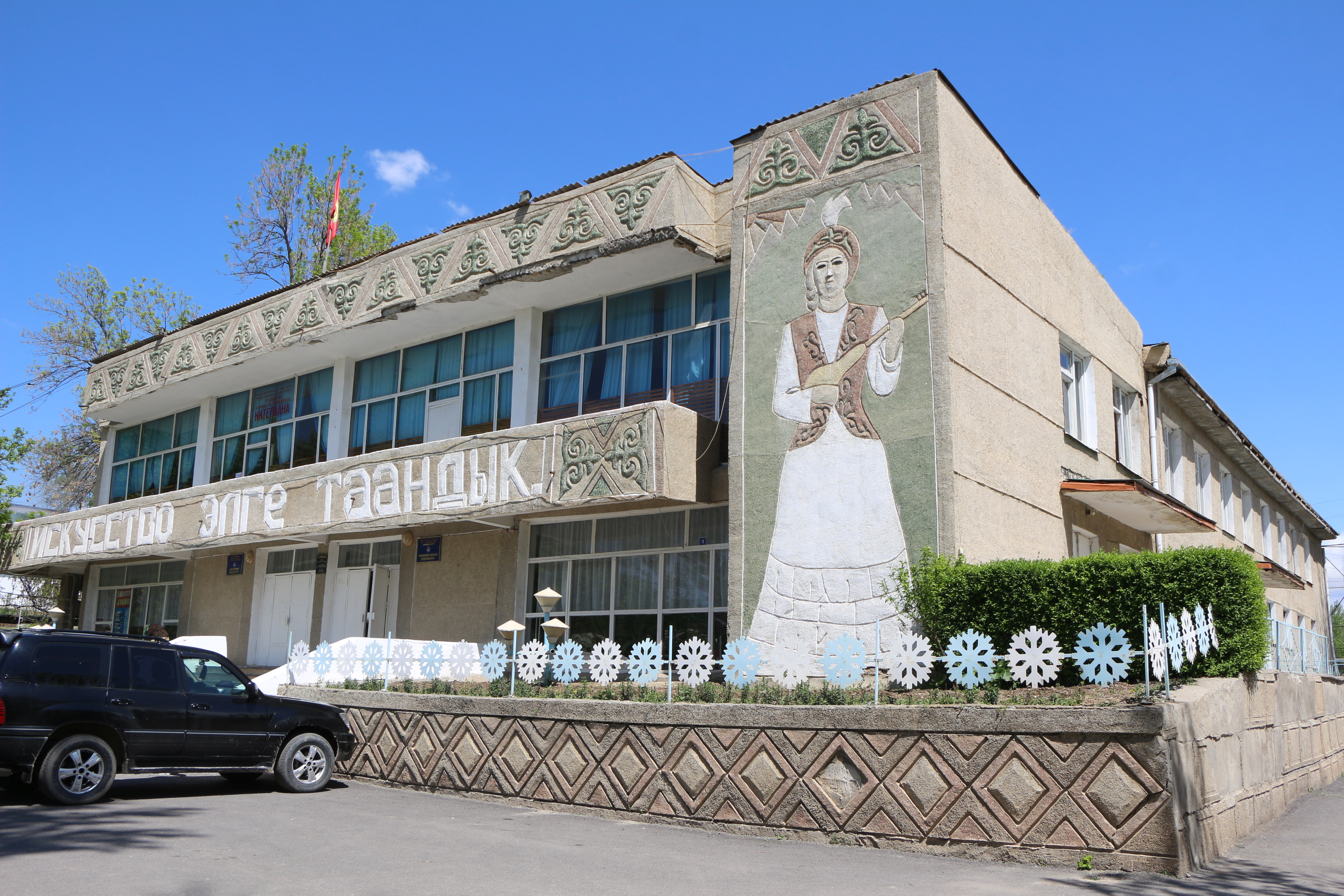
- The Leilek District Library is located on the second floor of the Razzakov House of Culture
- 39°50′13.8″N 69°31′35″E
- Location: Razzakov, Batken Region, Kyrgyzstan
- Established: 1928; 98 years ago
- Branches: 28

Collection
- Size: 219,943 volumes (2023)

Access and use
- Population served: 146,000

The Leylek District Library, also called the Leylek District Central Library (Kyrgyz: Лейлек райондук (борбордук) китепканасы; Russian: Лейлекская (центральная) районная библиотека) is the public library system that serves the city of Razzakov and the wider Leylek District in Kyrgyzstan. With a total of 28 branches across Leylek District, it is the largest public library network in Batken Region.

The library was established in 1928. The central branch along with the Leylek District Children's Library is located in Razzakov. In 1979, the Leylek District Library was designated as the central library in the Leylek District Library Network, which includes a total of 28 libraries. In 1985, the library network held 370,100 volumes and a membership of 28,300 individuals. The total collection of the network decreased to 219,943 volumes by 2023. The materials are primarily in Kyrgyz, Russian, and Uzbek, with additional resources available in foreign languages such as English and German.

The central branch is located on the second floor of the House of Culture in the city of Razzakov. According to 2023 data, the library holds 35,325 volumes. The Leylek District Children's Library (Kyrgyz: Лейлек райондук балдар китепканасы) is located across the street from the House of Culture. The Children's Library had a collection of 36,300 items tailored to young readers in 1985, which decreased to 26,277 by 2023.

== Branches ==
Library	Location	Collection
Leylek District Library	Razzakov	35,325
Leylek District Children's Library	Razzakov	26,277
Samat Village Library	Samat	7,232
Andarak Village Library	Andarak	9,014
Kök-Tash Village Library	Kök-Tash	6,541
Ak-Suu Village Library	Ak-Suu	9,981
Ak-Bulak Village Library	Al-Bulak	6,973
Ak-Aryk Village Library	AK-Aryk	7,817
Kulundu Village Library	Kulundu	6,243
Arka Village Library	Arka	6,410
Dostuk Village Library	Dostuk	6,060
Jashtyk Village Library	Jashtyk	5,461
Beshkent Village Library	Beshkent	8,415
Uch-Bulak (Churbek) Village Library	Uch-Bulak	4,192
Muras (Margun) Village Library	Muras	7,379
Kara-Bulak Village Library	Kara-Bulak	9,197
Ming-Jygach Village Library	Ming-Jygach	7,960
Ay-Köl Village Library	Ay-Köl	7,420
Aybike Village Library	Aybike	5,529
Korgon Village Library	Korgon	5,959
Katrang Village Library	Katrang	5,669
Baul Village Library	Baul	3,112
Özgörüsh Village Library	Özgörüsh	3,286
Golbo Village Library	Golbo	1,836
Chimgen Village Library	Chimgen	3,923
Taylan Village Library	Taylan	2,255
Jeti-Tash (Darkhum) Village Library	Jeti-Tash	5,229
Borborduk Village Library	Borborduk	5,248
Total		219,943
