= Toktogul Secondary School =

Toktogul Secondary School can refer to:

- Toktogul Secondary School (Isfana) - a high school in Isfana
- There are many schools that bear Toktogul's name; please expand the list
