= Ak Chyiyr Children's Education Center =

- Kyrgyz: «Ак-Чыйыр» балдардын билим борбору; Russian: Детский центр образования «Ак-Чыйыр»; Uzbek: „Oq chiyir“ bolalar taʼlim markazi / "Оқ чийир" болалар таълим маркази

Location
- Razzakov; Kyrgyzstan
- Coordinates: 39.84612°N 69.56241°E

Information
- School type: Boarding school
- Established: 2017; 9 years ago
- Grades: 1-9
- Language: Kyrgyz
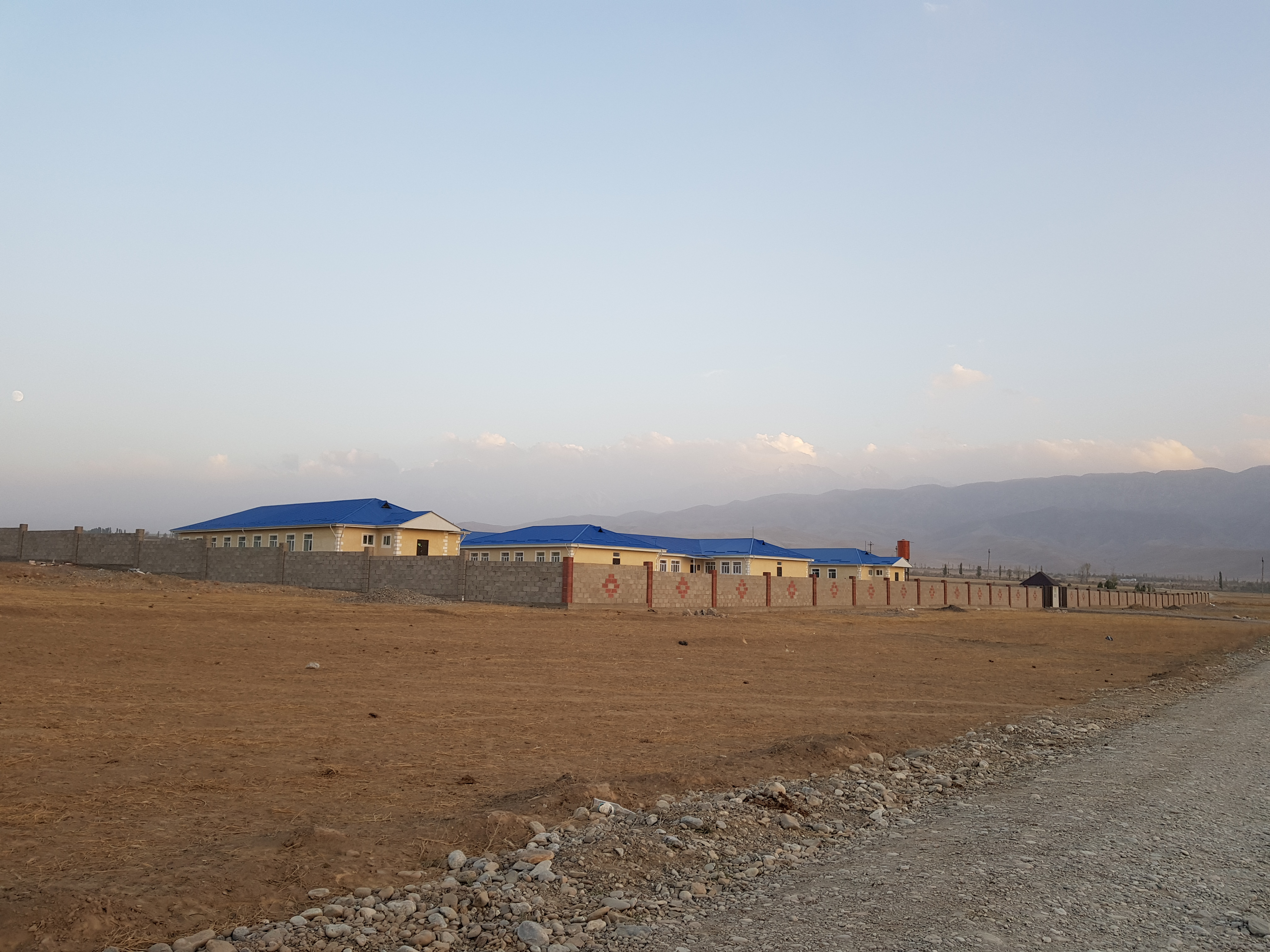
- Ak Chyiyr Children's Education Center

Ak Chyiyr Children's Education Center (Kyrgyz: «Ак-Чыйыр» балдардын билим борбору; Russian: Детский центр образования «Ак-Чыйыр»; Uzbek: „Oq chiyir“ bolalar taʼlim markazi / "Оқ чийир" болалар таълим маркази) is a boarding school for children from disadvantaged families located in Razzakov, Kyrgyzstan. The construction of the boarding school was funded by a Kuwaiti organization. "Ak сhyiyr " means "white path" in Kyrgyz.

Construction of the school started in May 2017 and was completed in September of the same year. Ak Chyiyr Children's Education Center can cater for approximately 315 students. The school is non-profit, co-educational, and non-denominational.

The medium of instruction at Ak Chyiyr Children's Education Center is Kyrgyz. In addition to Kyrgyz, students also study three other languages, namely Arabic, English, and Russian. Classes are offered for grades one through nine.
