= Amir Temur Secondary School (Razzakov) =

- Uzbek: Amir Temur nomli oʻrta maktab / Амир Темур номли ўрта мактаб
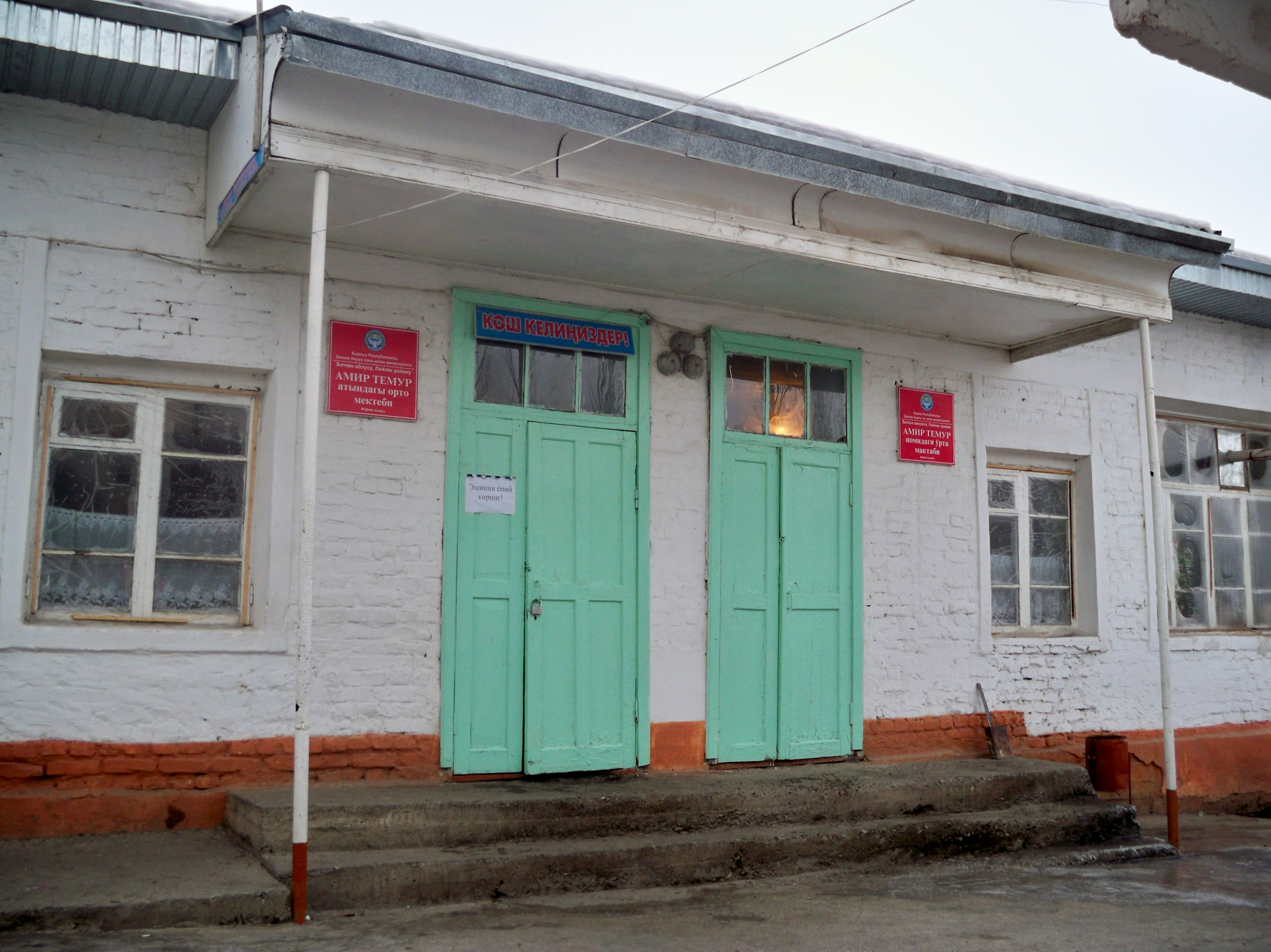

Location
- Razzakov; Kyrgyzstan
- Coordinates: 39.8422°N 69.5188°E

Information
- School type: Elementary, secondary, and high school
- Opened: 26 August 1994; 31 years ago
- Grades: 1-11
- Language: Uzbek

Amir Temur Secondary School (Uzbek: Amir Temur nomli oʻrta maktab / Амир Темур номли ўрта мактаб; Russian: Средняя школа имени Амира Темура; Kyrgyz: Амир Темур атындагы орто мектеби) is a secondary school in Razzakov, Kyrgyzstan. Although the school is called a secondary school, it offers classes for grades one through eleven. The school courses are taught in Uzbek.

The school was established in 1994. The current school building was completed in 1992. Amir Temur Secondary School was formerly called Usmon Matkarimov Secondary School. Following the establishment of Usmon Matkarimov Gymnasium and Boarding School, the name of the school was changed to Amir Temur Secondary School in honor of the Turkic Ruler Timur.

== General framework and curriculum ==
At Amir Temur School, children are accepted to first grade at the age of six or seven, depending on the child's individual development. The eleven-year school term is split into elementary (grades 1-4), middle (grades 5-9) and senior (grades 10-11) classes. Attending a "basic" nine-year (elementary and middle) program is compulsory. Grades 10-11 are optional.

As in many parts of the country, at Amir Temur Secondary School children of elementary classes are normally separated from other classes within their own floor of the school building. They are taught, ideally, by a single teacher through all four elementary grades (except for physical education and foreign languages).

Starting from the fifth grade, each academic subject is taught by a dedicated specialty teacher. The school curriculum for senior students includes subjects like mathematics, informatics, physics, chemistry, geography, biology, arts, music, physical education, history, and astronomy.

Like many other schools in Kyrgyzstan, Amir Temur Secondary School is a double shift school where two streams of students (morning shift and evening shift) share the same facility. The reason for this is that school capacity is insufficient to teach all of the students on a normal, morning-to-afternoon, schedule.

The school year extends from the beginning of September to the end of May and is divided into four terms. The school curriculum at Amir Temur Secondary School is fixed: unlike in some Western countries, schoolchildren cannot choose what subjects to study. Students are graded on a five-step scale, ranging in practice from 2 ("unacceptable") to 5 ("excellent"); 1 is a rarely used sign of extreme failure. Teachers regularly subdivide these grades (i.e. 4+, 5-) in daily use, but term and year results are graded strictly 2, 3, 4, or 5.

== Medium of instruction ==
The medium of instruction at Amir Temur Secondary School is Uzbek. In addition to Uzbek, students also study three other languages, namely English, Kyrgyz, and Russian. Like in many other Uzbek-language schools in Kyrgyzstan, the future of teaching in Uzbek remains uncertain at Amir Temur Secondary School.

Following the 2010 South Kyrgyzstan ethnic clashes, Kyrgyz authorities started to take measures to remove the Uzbek language from public life and to forcibly switch Uzbek schools to Kyrgyz. As part of these efforts, the number of teaching hours allocated to Kyrgyz language and literature lessons at Uzbek schools was significantly increased at the expense of Uzbek language and literature lessons.

Currently there are not enough school textbooks in Uzbek and the Kyrgyz government is unwilling to provide them, claiming that it does not have enough funds. As Kyrgyz officials strongly oppose the use of textbooks printed in Uzbekistan, currently the majority of Uzbek schoolchildren in Kyrgyzstan, including the students of Amir Temur Secondary School study in Uzbek using Kyrgyz textbooks.
