= Toktogul Secondary School (Razzakov) =

- Uzbek: Toʻqtogʻul nomli oʻrta maktab / Тўқтоғул номли ўрта мактаб

Location
- Razzakov; Kyrgyzstan
- Coordinates: 39.8387°N 69.5300°E

Information
- School type: Elementary, secondary, and high school
- Established: 1936; 90 years ago
- Grades: 1-11
- Language: Uzbek
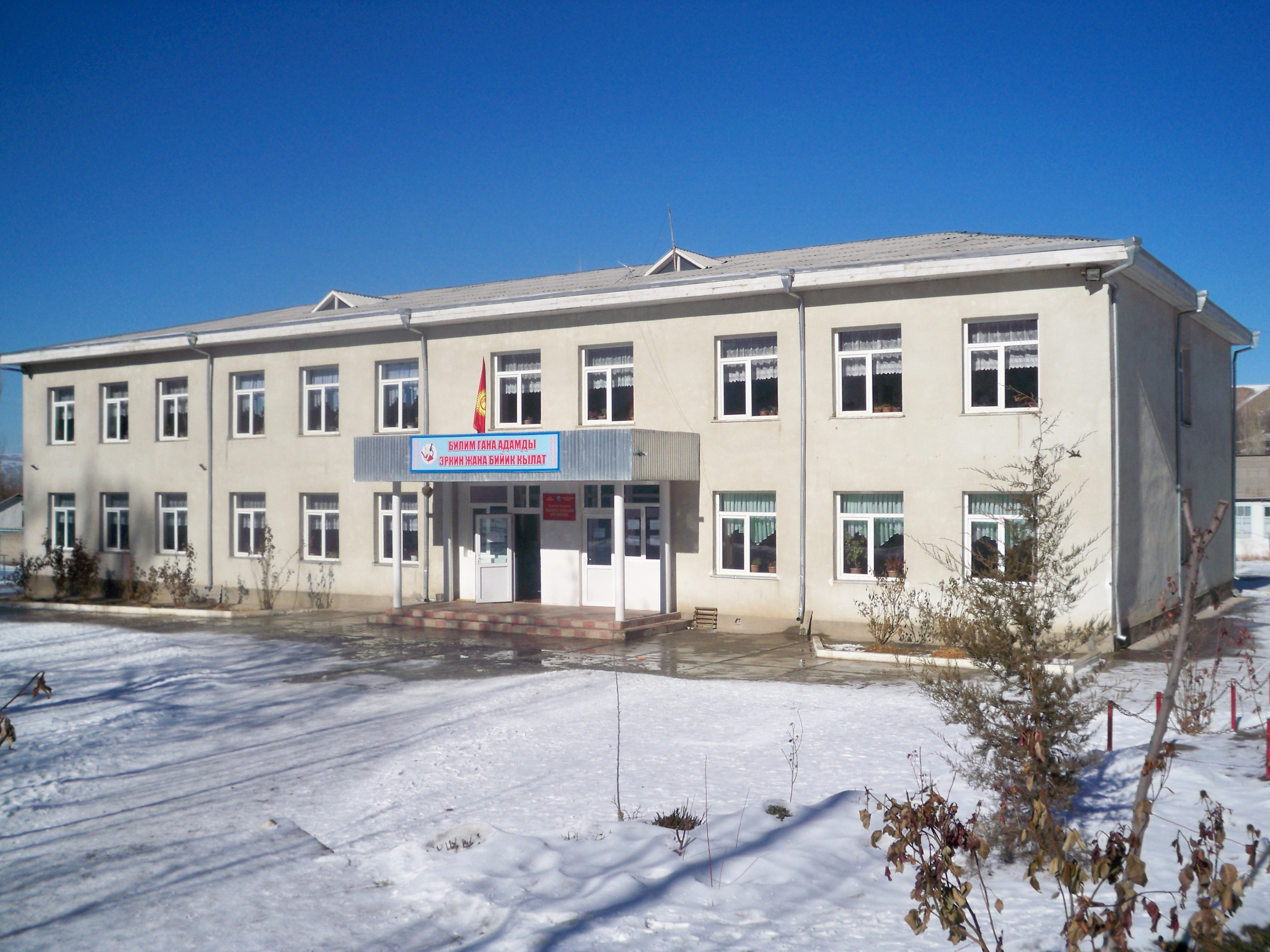
- The new building of Toktogul Secondary School. It was constructed in 2009 after a wing of the old building was damaged by an earthquake.

Toktogul Secondary School (Uzbek: Toʻqtogʻul nomli oʻrta maktab / Тўқтоғул номли ўрта мактаб; Russian: Средняя школа имени Токтогула; Kyrgyz: Токтогул орто мектеби) is a secondary school in Isfana, Kyrgyzstan. Although the school is called a secondary school, it offers classes for grades one through eleven. The school courses are taught in Uzbek.

Toktogul Secondary School was established in 1936. Currently the school has two buildings. The old building was completed in 1947. In 2007, a wing of the old building was seriously damaged by an earthquake. A new two-story building was constructed in 2009.

== General framework and curriculum ==
At Isfana School, children are accepted to first grade at the age of six or seven, depending on the child's individual development. The eleven-year school term is split into elementary (grades 1-4), middle (grades 5-9) and senior (grades 10-11) classes. Attending a "basic" nine-year (elementary and middle) program is compulsory. Grades 10-11 are optional.

As in many parts of the country, at Toktogul Secondary School children of elementary classes are normally separated from other classes within their own floor of the school building. They are taught, ideally, by a single teacher through all four elementary grades (except for physical education and foreign languages).

Starting from the fifth grade, each academic subject is taught by a dedicated specialty teacher. The school curriculum for senior students includes subjects like mathematics, informatics, physics, chemistry, geography, biology, arts, music, physical education, history, and astronomy.

Like many other schools in Kyrgyzstan, Toktogul Secondary School is a double shift school where two streams of students (morning shift and evening shift) share the same facility. The reason for this is that school capacity is insufficient to teach all of the students on a normal, morning-to-afternoon, schedule.

The school year extends from the beginning of September to the end of May and is divided into four terms. The school curriculum at Toktogul Secondary School is fixed: unlike in some Western countries, schoolchildren cannot choose what subjects to study. Students are graded on a five-step scale, ranging in practice from 2 ("unacceptable") to 5 ("excellent"); 1 is a rarely used sign of extreme failure. Teachers regularly subdivide these grades (i.e. 4+, 5-) in daily use, but term and year results are graded strictly 2, 3, 4, or 5.

== Medium of instruction ==
The medium of instruction at Toktogul Secondary School is Uzbek. In addition to Uzbek, students also study three other languages, namely English, Kyrgyz, and Russian. Like in many other Uzbek-language schools in Kyrgyzstan, the future of teaching in Uzbek remains uncertain at Toktogul Secondary School.

Following the 2010 South Kyrgyzstan ethnic clashes, Kyrgyz authorities started to take measures to remove the Uzbek language from public life and to forcibly switch Uzbek schools to Kyrgyz. As part of these efforts, the number of teaching hours allocated to Kyrgyz language and literature lessons at Uzbek schools was significantly increased at the expense of Uzbek language and literature lessons.

Currently there are not enough school textbooks in Uzbek and the Kyrgyz government is unwilling to provide them, claiming that it does not have enough funds. As Kyrgyz officials strongly oppose the use of textbooks printed in Uzbekistan, currently the majority of Uzbek schoolchildren in Kyrgyzstan, including the students of Toktogul Secondary School study in Uzbek using Kyrgyz textbooks.

== Notable alumni ==
- Jaloliddin Sirojiddinov — notable Soviet economist and statistician, professor
- Maʼrifjon Moʻminov — third mayor of Isfana, longtime head of Isfana's main kolkhoz
- Karimoxun Roʻzioxunov — notable engineer, honored agricultural worker of Kyrgyzstan
