= Vocational School No. 48 =

Vocational School No 48
- Kyrgyz: № 48 кесиптик лицейи Russian: Профессиональный лицей № 48
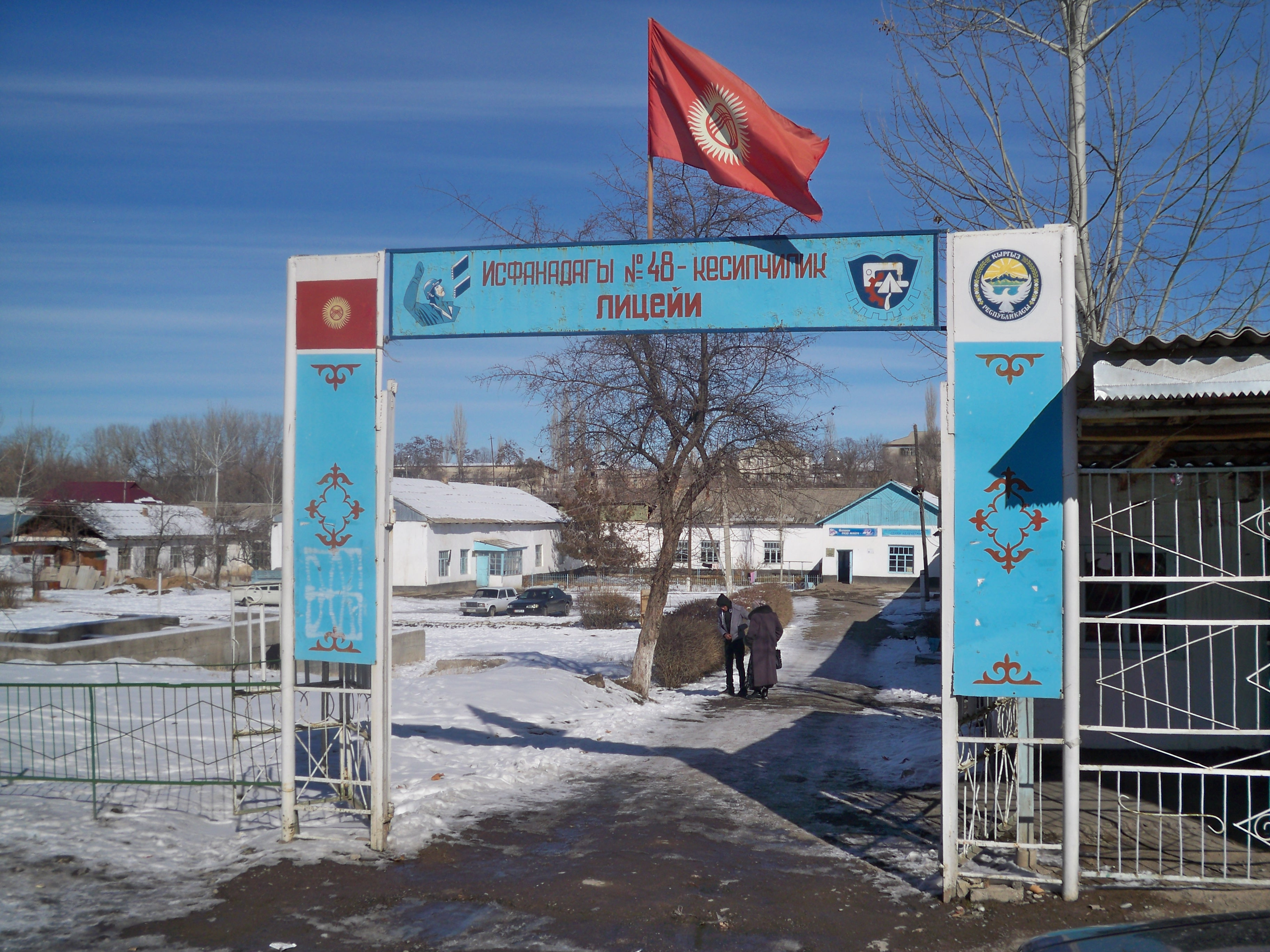
- Vocational School No. 48 in 2014

Location
- 35 Koshmuratov Street; Razzakov, Kyrgyzstan
- Coordinates: 39.836367°N 69.527725°E

Information
- Type: Public vocational school

Vocational School No 48 (Kyrgyz: № 48 кесиптик лицейи; Russian: Профессиональный лицей № 48) is a vocational school in Razzakov, Kyrgyzstan. It was previously known as Professional Technical School No 48. The school is home to a reserve company of Leilek District Administration.

Vocational School No 48 offers a diverse set of vocational classes including sewing, cooking, carpentry, electrician, and driving classes. Construction of a new building of the school commenced in 2008. It is scheduled to be put into operation in 2018.
