= Alisher Navoiy Secondary School (Razzakov) =

- Uzbek: Alisher Navoiy nomli oʻrta maktab / Алишер Навоий номли ўрта мактаб Kyrgyz: Алишер Навои атындаги орто мектеби Russian: Средняя школа имени Алишера Навои

Location
- Razzakov; Kyrgyzstan
- Coordinates: 39.8380°N 69.5459°E

Information
- School type: Elementary, secondary, and high school
- Established: 1977; 49 years ago
- Headmaster: Orozgul Sattarova
- Grades: 1-11
- Enrollment: 1,400
- Language: Uzbek, Kyrgyz, and Russian
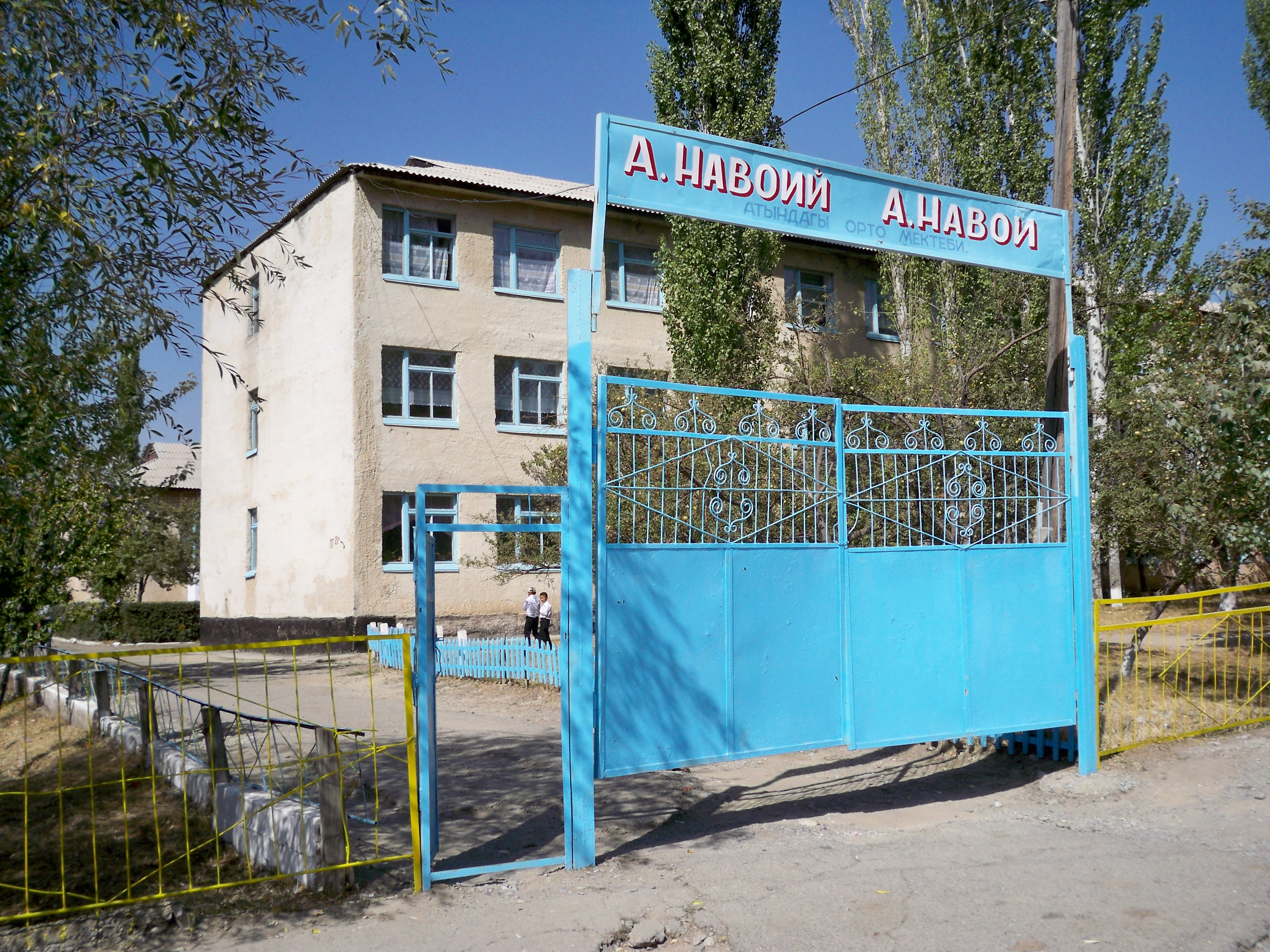
- The main entrance to Alisher Navoiy Secondary School

Alisher Navoiy Secondary School (Uzbek: Alisher Navoiy nomli oʻrta maktab / Алишер Навоий номли ўрта мактаб; Kyrgyz: Алишер Навои атындаги орто мектеби; Russian: Средняя школа имени Алишера Навои) is a secondary school in Razzakov, Kyrgyzstan. Although the school is called a secondary school, it offers classes for grades one through eleven. The school has Uzbek, Kyrgyz, and Russian classes.

The school was established in 1977 on the occasion of the 60th anniversary of the October Revolution and was therefore initially called the 60th Anniversary of the October Revolution (Uzbek: Oktabr 60 yilligi/Октябрь 60 йиллиги; Kyrgyz: Октябрь 60 жылдыгы; Russian: 60 лет Октября). In 1991, the school was renamed Alisher Navoiy Secondary School in honor of the great Turkic poet and statesman Ali-Shir Nava'i. The school has a museum collection containing over 300 artifacts, including a letter by Joseph Stalin addressed to the people of Razzakov.

== History ==
The school was officially opened on December 1, 1977, on the occasion of the 60th anniversary of the October Revolution and was called the 60th Anniversary of the October Revolution. Shamshiddin Qunduzov was appointed as the first principal of the new school. The school initially had only Uzbek classes. In 1991, the first Kyrgyz classed were opened.

In 1980, at the initiative of Nasrullo (Mashrab) Mahmarajabov a memorial obelisk was erected in the school yard to honor those who died fighting against Nazi Germany and its allies during World War II.

From 1987 until 1990, Marziya Sharipova served as principal of the school. In 1990, she was succeeded by Saodat Muhammedjanova. In 1991, on the occasion of the 550th anniversary of the birth of the great Turkic poet and statesman Ali-Shir Nava'i the school was renamed Alisher Navoiy Secondary School.

In 1993, Shokirjon Toʻychiyev was appointed as principal of the school. In the 1990, the school had several branches at Issyk Kul and Nariste kindergartens as well as the local road construction company. In 1999, one of the school branches became a separate institution, namely, Issyk Kul Secondary School.

In 2000, Habibullo Sattorov became school principal. In 2010, Toʻyichev was once again appointed as principal and served until 2013. Since 2013, Orozgul Sattarova has served as school principal.

In the wake of the 2010 South Kyrgyzstan ethnic clashes, local Kyrgyz authorities attempted to rename the school on many occasions, but did not succeed. In 2012, Ali-Shir Nava'i's portrait that used to hang in the school lobby was removed under pressure from local authorities.

Academic year	Number of studetins completing grade 11
1977—1978	132
1978—1979	66
1979—1980	49
1980—1981	74
1981—1982	71
1982—1983	79
1983—1984	68
1984—1985	69
1985—1986	84
1986—1987	61
1987—1988	78
1988—1989	78
1989—1990	79
1990—1991	34
1991—1992	42
1992—1993	36
1993—1994	37
1994—1995	54
1995—1996	43
1996—1997	41
1997—1998	45
1998—1999	82
1999—2000	86
2000—2001	93
2001—2002	80
2002—2003	80
2003—2004	121
2004—2005	82
2005—2006	77
2006—2007	63
2007—2008	78
2008—2009	57
2009—2010	52
2010—2011	39
2011—2012	58
2012—2013	64
2013—2014	44
2014—2015	75
2015—2016	55
2016—2017	56

== General framework and curriculum ==
At Alisher Navoiy Secondary School, children are accepted to first grade at the age of six or seven, depending on the child's individual development. The eleven-year school term is split into elementary (grades 1-4), middle (grades 5-9) and senior (grades 10-11) classes. Attending a "basic" nine-year (elementary and middle) program is compulsory. Grades 10-11 are optional.

As in many parts of the country, at Alisher Navoiy Secondary School children of elementary classes are normally separated from other classes within their own floor of the school building. They are taught, ideally, by a single teacher through all four elementary grades (except for physical education and foreign languages).

Starting from the fifth grade, each academic subject is taught by a dedicated specialty teacher. The school curriculum for senior students includes subjects like mathematics, informatics, physics, chemistry, geography, biology, arts, music, physical education, history, and astronomy.

Like many other schools in Kyrgyzstan, Alisher Navoiy Secondary School is a double shift school where two streams of students (morning shift and evening shift) share the same facility. The reason for this is that school capacity is insufficient to teach all of the students on a normal, morning-to-afternoon, schedule.

The school year extends from the beginning of September to the end of May and is divided into four terms. The school curriculum at Alisher Navoiy Secondary School is fixed: unlike in some Western countries, schoolchildren cannot choose what subjects to study. Students are graded on a five-step scale, ranging in practice from 2 ("unacceptable") to 5 ("excellent"); 1 is a rarely used sign of extreme failure. Teachers regularly subdivide these grades (i.e. 4+, 5-) in daily use, but term and year results are graded strictly 2, 3, 4, or 5.

== Medium of instruction ==
There are Uzbek, Kyrgyz, and Russian classes at the school. Like in many other Uzbek-language schools in Kyrgyzstan, the future of teaching in Uzbek remains uncertain at Alisher Navoiy Secondary School.

Following the 2010 South Kyrgyzstan ethnic clashes, Kyrgyz authorities started to take measures to remove the Uzbek language from public life and to forcibly switch Uzbek schools to Kyrgyz. As part of these efforts, the number of teaching hours allocated to Kyrgyz language and literature lessons at Uzbek schools was significantly increased at the expense of Uzbek language and literature lessons.

Currently there are not enough school textbooks in Uzbek and the Kyrgyz government is unwilling to provide them, claiming that it does not have enough funds. As Kyrgyz officials strongly oppose the use of textbooks printed in Uzbekistan, currently the majority of Uzbek schoolchildren in Kyrgyzstan, including the students of Alisher Navoiy Secondary School study in Uzbek using Kyrgyz textbooks.

== School's performance on the National Scholarship Test ==
Since 2002 graduating students in Kyrgyzstan have been able to take the National Scholarship Test (NST), a standardized test for university admissions. The test is offered for high school graduates to compete for government-funded college scholarships. It is administered by the Centre for Education Assessment and Teaching Methods as well as the Ministry of Education and is funded by the United States Agency for International Development. Taking the test is not compulsory.

The test has two parts: main test and subject tests. Those taking the test must sit the main test. Students take the subject tests based on what programs they would like to apply for.

Graduating students of Alisher Navoiy Secondary School have taken the NST since 2002. Students scoring above a certain benchmark (usually 200) receive a "golden certificate" and have a higher chance of getting a government-funded scholarship. To date no graduate student of Alisher Navoiy Secondary School has scored above 200. The highest NST score in the school's history was attained by Abdusamat kyzy Meerim who received a score of 193 in 2017.

Until 2013, the NST could be taken in Kyrgyz, Russian, and Uzbek. In the wake of the inter-ethnic clashes between the Kyrgyz and Uzbeks in southern Kyrgyzstan, some Kyrgyz politicians started to call for stopping offering the test in Uzbek. The Uzbek test was reported to have been discontinued in 2013. However, later that year this decision was reversed and Uzbek students were able to take the test in their native language.

In 2014, not long before the official start of the test, it was decisively announced that the test would not be offered in Uzbek any longer. However, once the test was over, it was announced that those who had not yet registered could take the test in Uzbek in June. It was announced that students who wished to take the test in Uzbek could register only in Bishkek or Osh. Currently students can take the test only in Russian or Kyrgyz.

== School museum ==
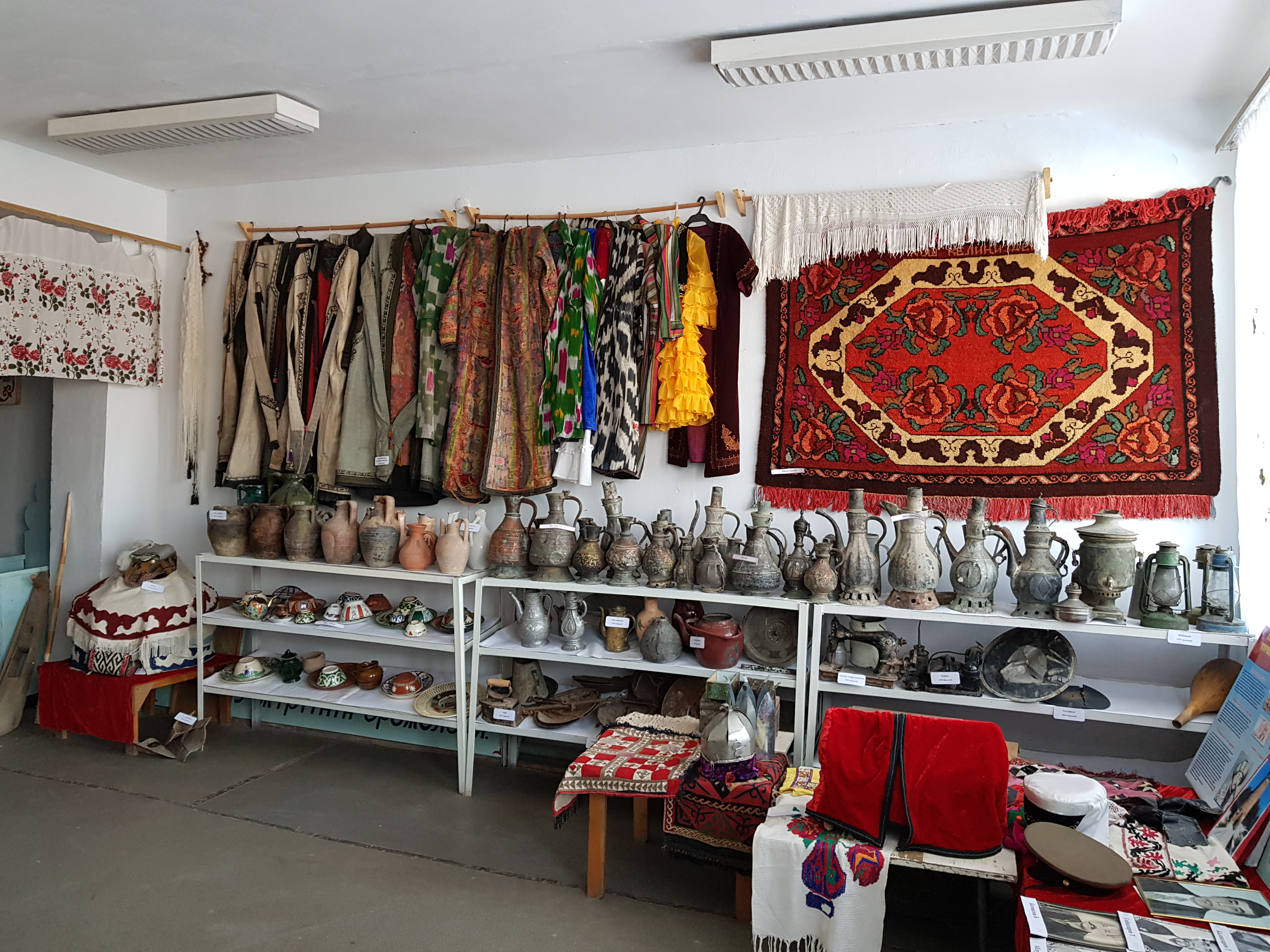
Alisher Navoiy Secondary School museum

Alisher Navoiy Secondary School has a historical museum. It was established on May 28, 1998. The museum collection contains over 300 artifacts.

The museum collection contains items relating to the history and ethnography of Leilek District as well as the history of the school. Among these are clothes worn during the reign of the Khanate of Kokand, historic coins, and a letter by Joseph Stalin addressed to the people of Isfana.
