= Gymnasium No. 1 (Razzakov) =

- Kyrgyz: №1-гимназия

Location
- Razzakov; Kyrgyzstan
- Coordinates: 39.8341°N 69.5214°E

Information
- School type: gymnasium and boarding school
- Grades: 5-11
- Language: Kyrgyz
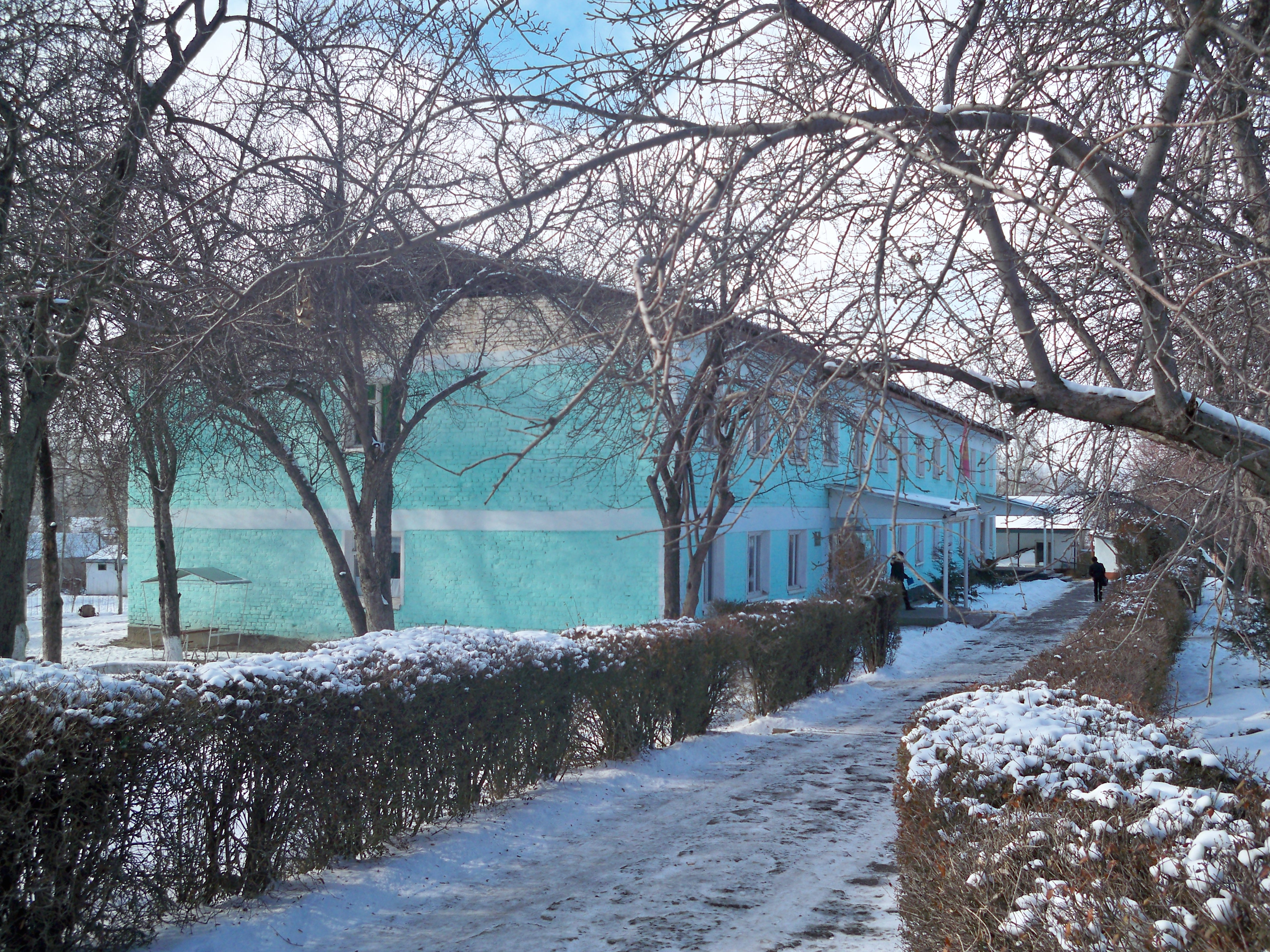
- The main building of Gymnasium No. 1

Gymnasium No. 1 (Kyrgyz: №1-гимназия; Russian: Гимназия №1) is a gymnasium and boarding school located in Razzakov, Kyrgyzstan. The official name of the school is Gymnasium School No. 1 (Kyrgyz: №1-мектеп-гимназия; Russian: Школа-гимназия №1). Since the medium of instruction at Gymnasium No. 1 is Kyrgyz, it is also colloquially called the Kyrgyz Gymnasium.

Education is free at Gymnasium No. 1. Classes are offered for grades five through eleven. The school usually accepts more academically inclined students. Some of the students, who mainly come from villages located in Leilek District, live in the school boarding house during the academic year. The current school building was completed in 1961.

== Curriculum ==
Gymnasium No. 1 accepts more academically inclined students. Students must take entrance exams to enroll. While Gymnasium No. 1 provides general education like other secondary schools in Razzakov, students of the gymnasium take more classes and have to study harder.

The school curriculum includes subjects like mathematics, informatics, physics, chemistry, geography, biology, arts, music, physical education, history, and astronomy. Students also learn Russian and English.

At Gymnasium No. 1, the seven-year school term is split into middle (grades 5–9) and senior (grades 10–11) classes. Upon completing grade nine, students take state exams and get a certificate confirming their completion of the core nine-year program. Grades 10 and 11 are optional. Students take state exams once again when they finish grade eleven.

The school year extends from the beginning of September to the end of May and is divided into four terms. The school curriculum at Gymnasium No. 1 is fixed: unlike in some Western countries, schoolchildren cannot choose what subjects to study. Students are graded on a five-step scale, ranging in practice from 2 ("unacceptable") to 5 ("excellent"); 1 is a rarely used sign of extreme failure. Teachers regularly subdivide these grades (i.e. 4+, 5-) in daily use, but term and year results are graded strictly 2, 3, 4, or 5.

Main classes are taught in the morning. In the afternoon, students must attend additional classes. One, two, or three additional classes are taught in the afternoon, depending on the grade. These classes are compulsory. Each class lasts for 45 minutes.
