= Samat, Kyrgyzstan =

Samat Kyrgyz: Самат
- Village
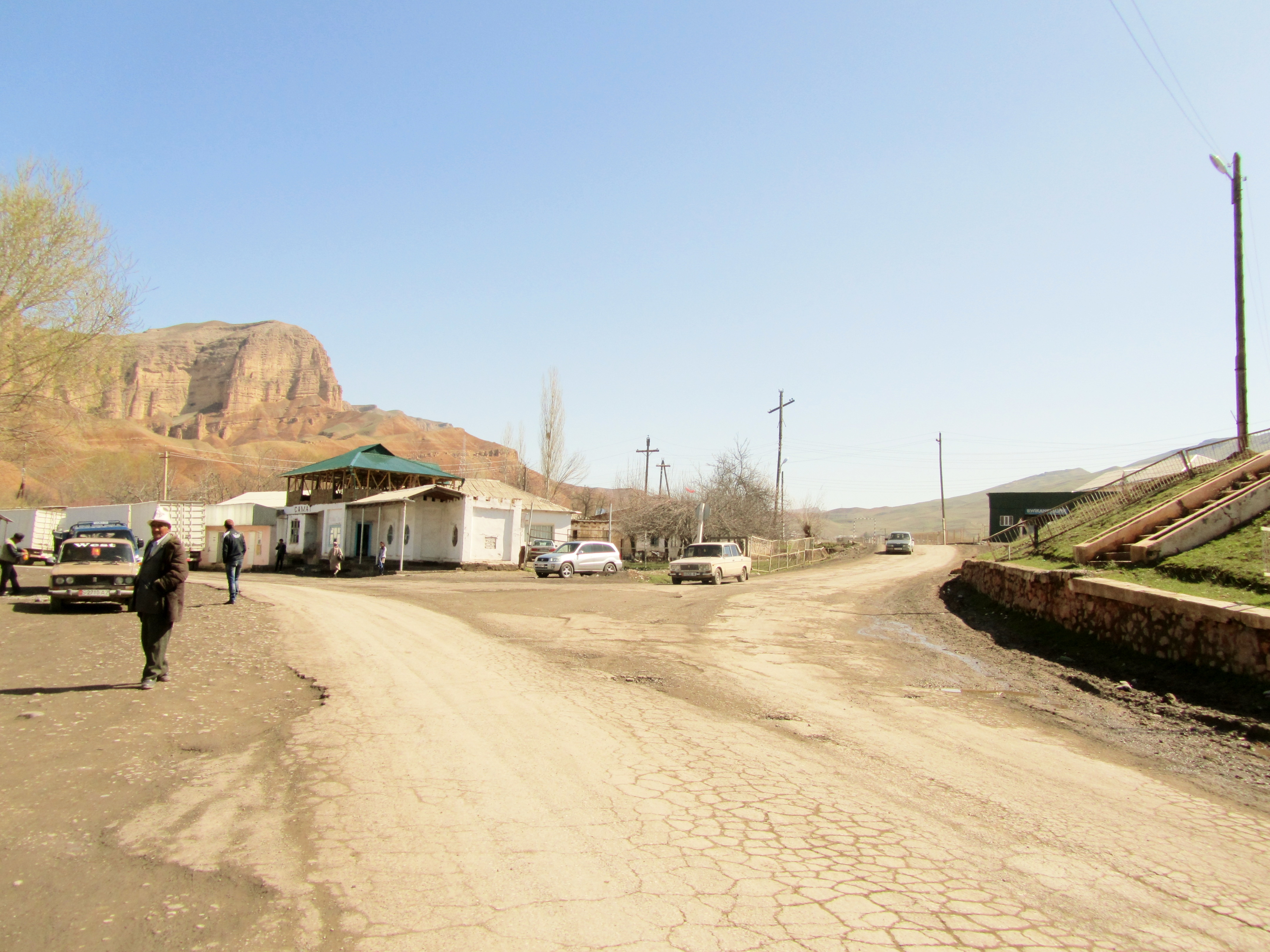
- The main traffic junction in the village of Samat

- Location in Kyrgyzstan
- Coordinates: 39°54′36.6″N 69°30′31.3″E
- Country: Kyrgyzstan
- Region: Batken
- District: Leylek

Area
  - Total: 1.16 km^{2} (0.45 sq mi)

Population (2021)
  - Total: 2,359
  - Density: 2,030/km^{2} (5,270/sq mi)
- Time zone: UTC+6
- Website: http://www.isfana.org/

Samat (Kyrgyz: Самат, romanized: Samat) is a village located in Leylek District of Batken Region, Kyrgyzstan. The village is subordinated to the town of Isfana. Its population was 2,359 in 2021.
