= Ak-Bulak, Leylek =

Ak-Bulak Kyrgyz: Ак-Булак
- Village
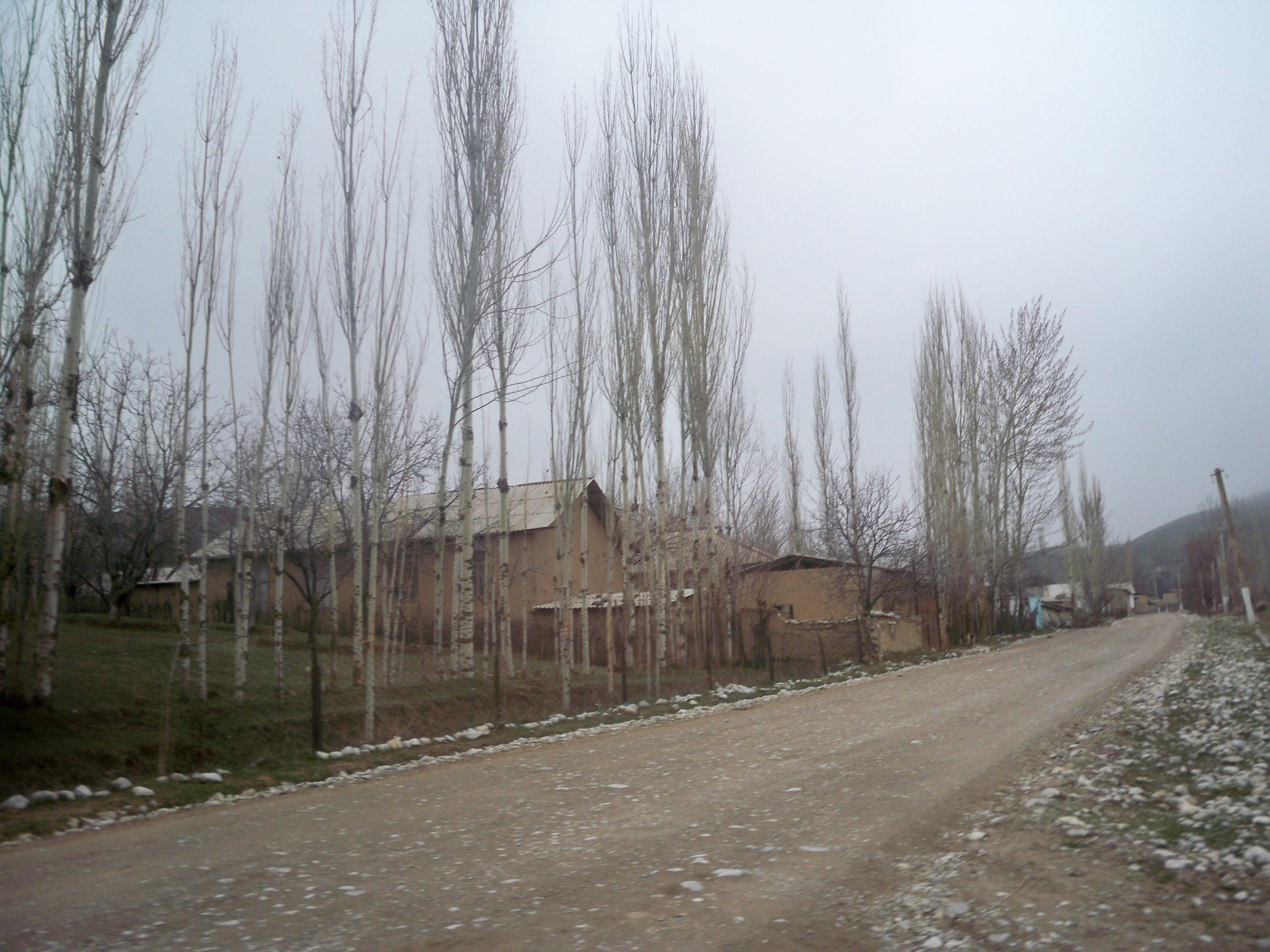
- One of the main roads in Aq-Bulaq

- Location in Kyrgyzstan
- Coordinates: 39°48′05.5″N 69°31′39.9″E
- Country: Kyrgyzstan
- Region: Batken
- District: Leylek

Area
  - Total: 0.3 km^{2} (0.12 sq mi)

Population (2021)
  - Total: 952
  - Density: 3,200/km^{2} (8,200/sq mi)
- Time zone: UTC+6
- Website: http://www.isfana.org/

Ak-Bulak (Kyrgyz: Ак-Булак) is a small village located in Leylek District of Batken Region, Kyrgyzstan. The village is subordinated to the town of Isfana. Its population was 952 in 2021.
