= Samat Sadykov Park =

Public park in Razzakov

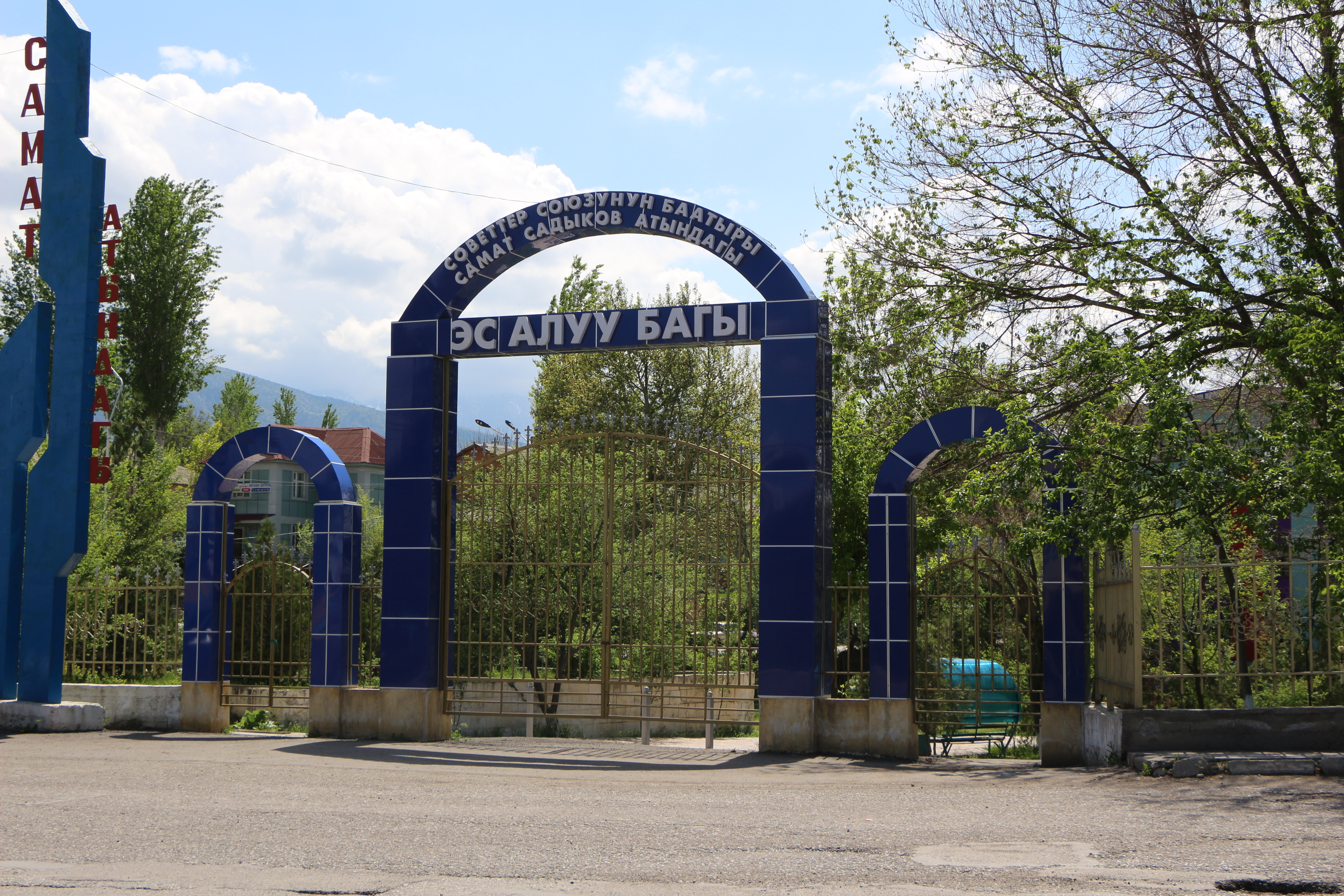
- The park's main entrance, 2022
- Interactive map of Samat Sadykov Park
- Type: Public park
- Location: Razzakov, Kyrgyzstan
- Coordinates: 39°50′14.1″N 69°31′45.7″E
- Area: 2.71 ha (6.7 acres)
- Operator: Razzakov City Administration
- Status: Open year round

Samat Sadykov Park (Kyrgyz: Самат Садыков атындагы эс алуу багы; Russian: Парк имени Самата Садыкова; Uzbek: Samat Sodiqov nomidagi istirohat bogʻi) is a 2.71 ha (6.7 acres) urban park in Razzakov, Kyrgyzstan. It is named after Samat Sadykov, who in 1945 was posthumously awarded the title of Hero of the Soviet Union.

Samat Sadykov Park is the only urban park in Razzakov. It has two primary entrances, the main entrance from the town's main roundabout on Dodosyan Street and a western entrance from Manas Ata Street. The park includes a soccer field, picnic areas, playgrounds, and a small forest.

== History ==
Part of the soccer field in Samat Sadykov Park was built over an ancient cemetery. In 2017, ownership of the park was transferred from the Ministry of Culture, Information and Tourism of the Kyrgyz Republic to the Razzakov (then Isfana) City Administration.

In 2020, the park was renovated with funding from Soros Foundation–Kyrgyzstan, a local branch of Open Society Foundations. In 2024, it was announced that 6 million Kyrgyz soms had been allocated to upgrade the playground in the park.
