= Ak-Bosogo, Batken =

Ak-Bosogo Kyrgyz: Ак-Босого
- Village
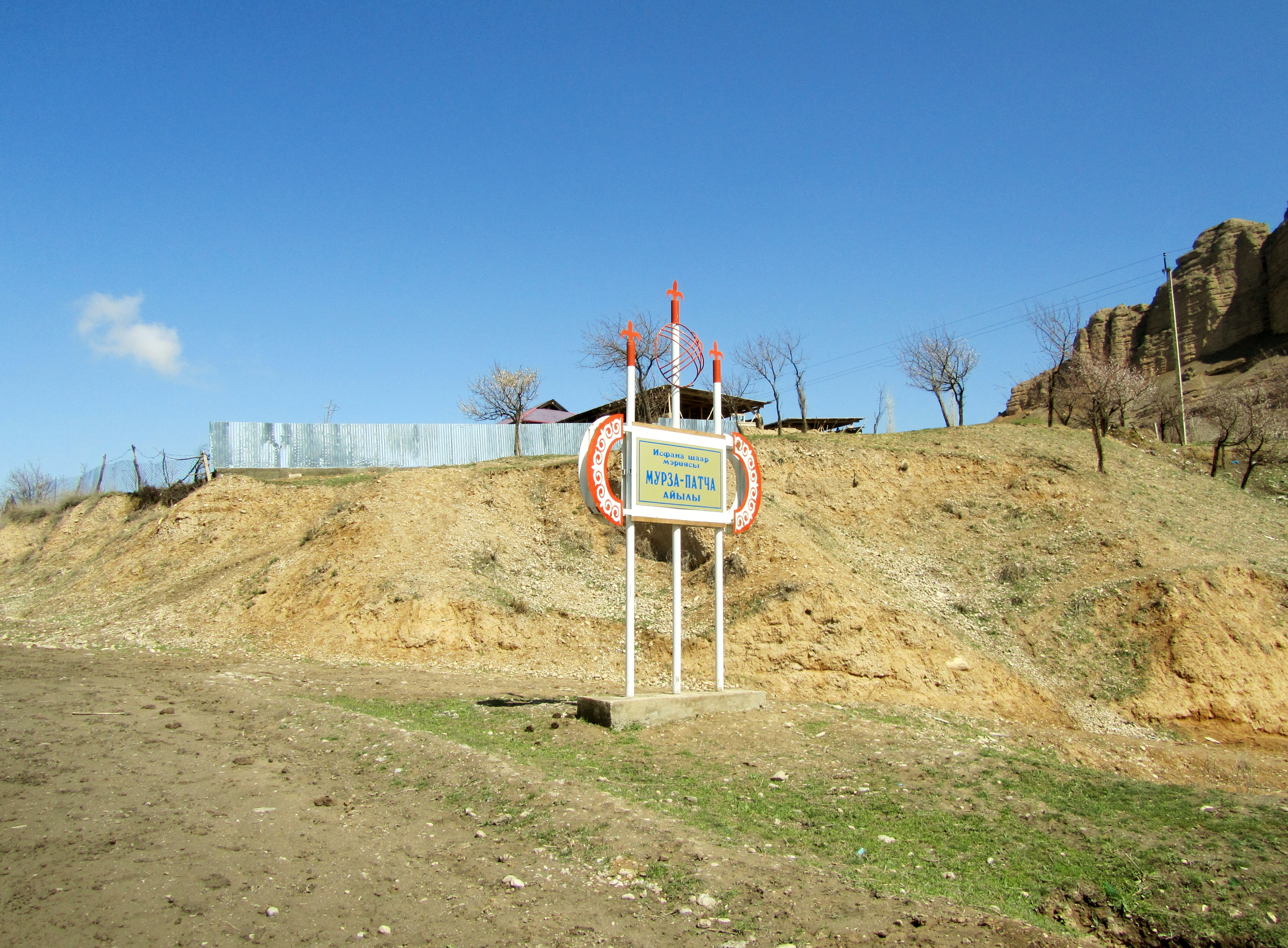
- The sign in the southern corner of Mırza-Patça

- Location in Kyrgyzstan
- Coordinates: 39°55′11.1″N 69°30′04.6″E
- Country: Kyrgyzstan
- Region: Batken
- District: Leylek

Area
  - Total: 0.26 km^{2} (0.10 sq mi)

Population (2021)
  - Total: 901
  - Density: 3,500/km^{2} (9,000/sq mi)
- Time zone: UTC+6
- Website: http://www.isfana.org/

Ak-Bosogo (Kyrgyz: Ак-Босого), previously known as Myrza-Patcha (Kyrgyz: Мырза-Патча), is a small village located in Batken Region, Kyrgyzstan. The village is subordinated to the town of Razzakov within the Leylek District. Its population was 901 in 2021.

== See also ==
- Ak-Bosogo
