= Taylan, Batken =

Taylan Kyrgyz: Тайлан
- Village
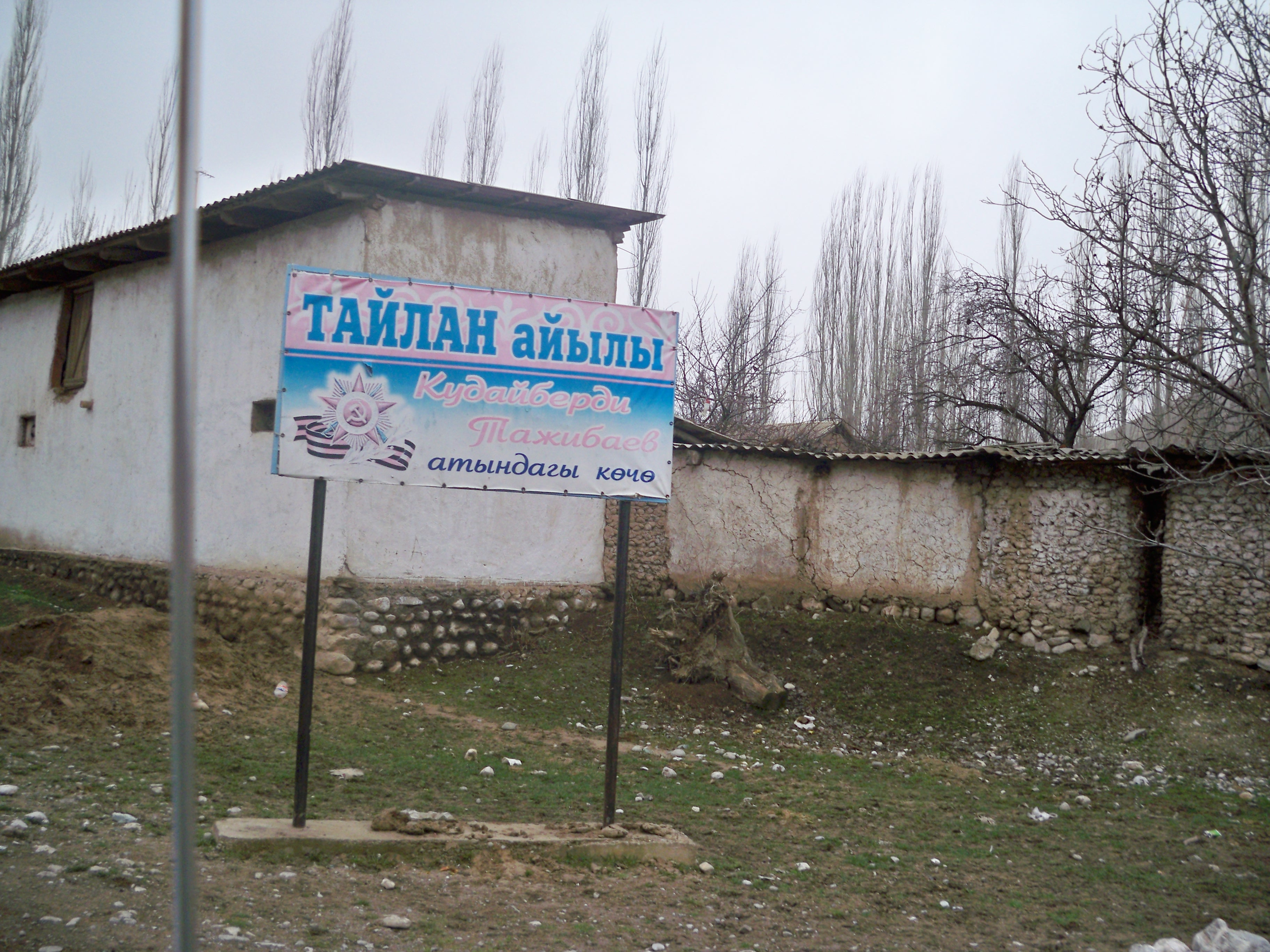
- The sign in the northern corner of Taylan

- Location in Kyrgyzstan
- Coordinates: 39°49′14.7″N 69°31′45.3″E
- Country: Kyrgyzstan
- Region: Batken
- District: Leylek

Area
  - Total: 0.49 km^{2} (0.19 sq mi)

Population (2021)
  - Total: 1,616
  - Density: 3,300/km^{2} (8,500/sq mi)
- Time zone: UTC+6
- Website: http://www.isfana.org/

Taylan (Kyrgyz: Тайлан, romanized: Taylan) is a village located in Batken Region, Kyrgyzstan. The village is subordinated to the town of Isfana within the Leylek District. Its population was 1,616 in 2021.
