= Chymken =

Chymken Kyrgyz: Чымкен
- Village
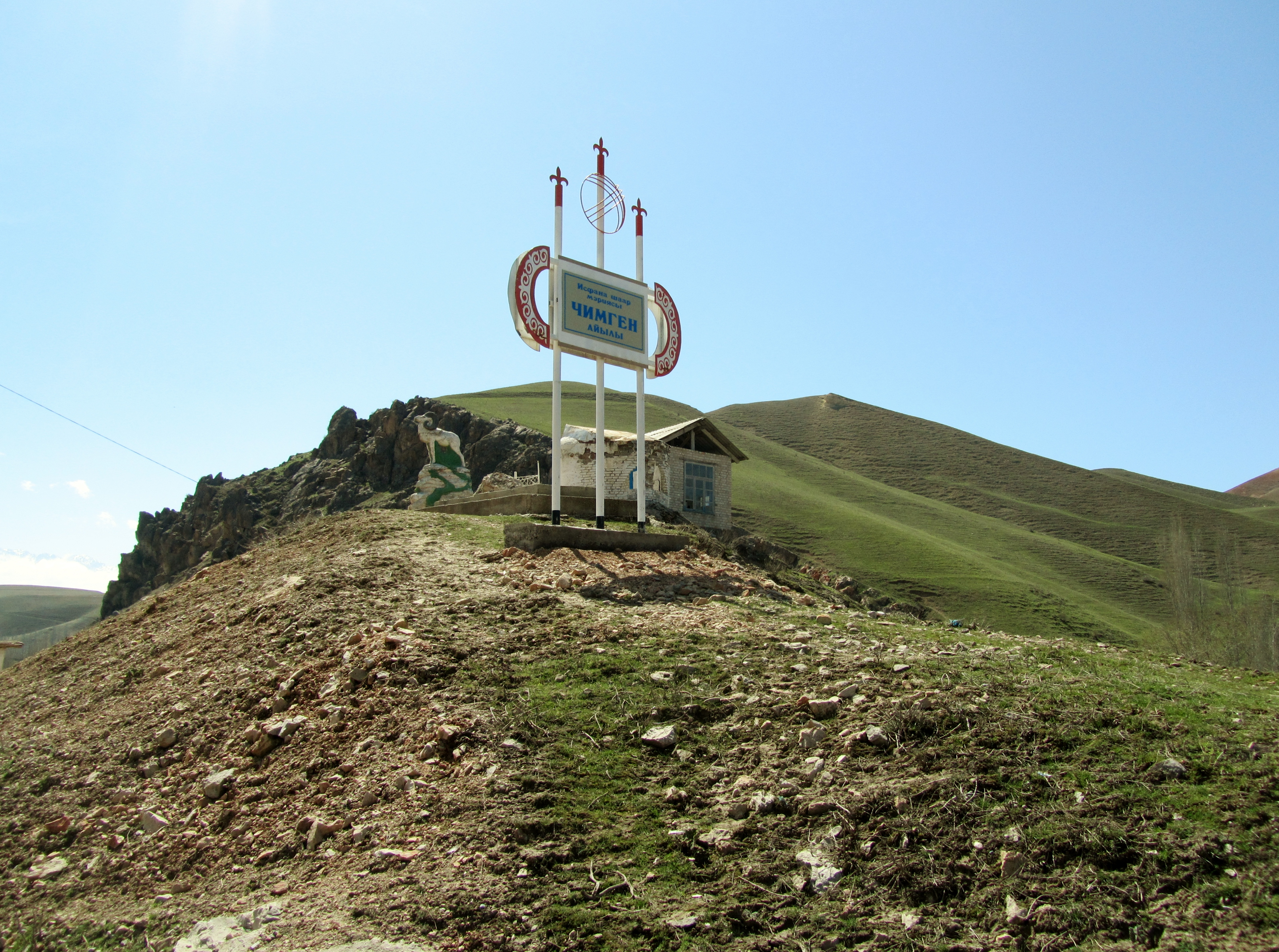
- The sign in the northern corner of Chymken

- Location in Kyrgyzstan
- Coordinates: 39°52′21″N 69°30′20″E
- Country: Kyrgyzstan
- Region: Batken
- District: Leylek

Area
  - Total: 0.87 km^{2} (0.34 sq mi)

Population (2021)
  - Total: 3,490
  - Density: 4,000/km^{2} (10,000/sq mi)
- Time zone: UTC+6 (KGT)
- Website: http://www.isfana.org/

Chymken (Kyrgyz: Чымкен), before 2025 Chimgen (Kyrgyz: Чимген), is a village located in Batken Region, Kyrgyzstan. The village is subordinated to the town of Razzakov (Isfana) within the Leylek District. Its population was 3,490 in 2021.
