= Altyn-Beshik =

Altyn-Beshik Kyrgyz: Алтын-Бешик
- Village
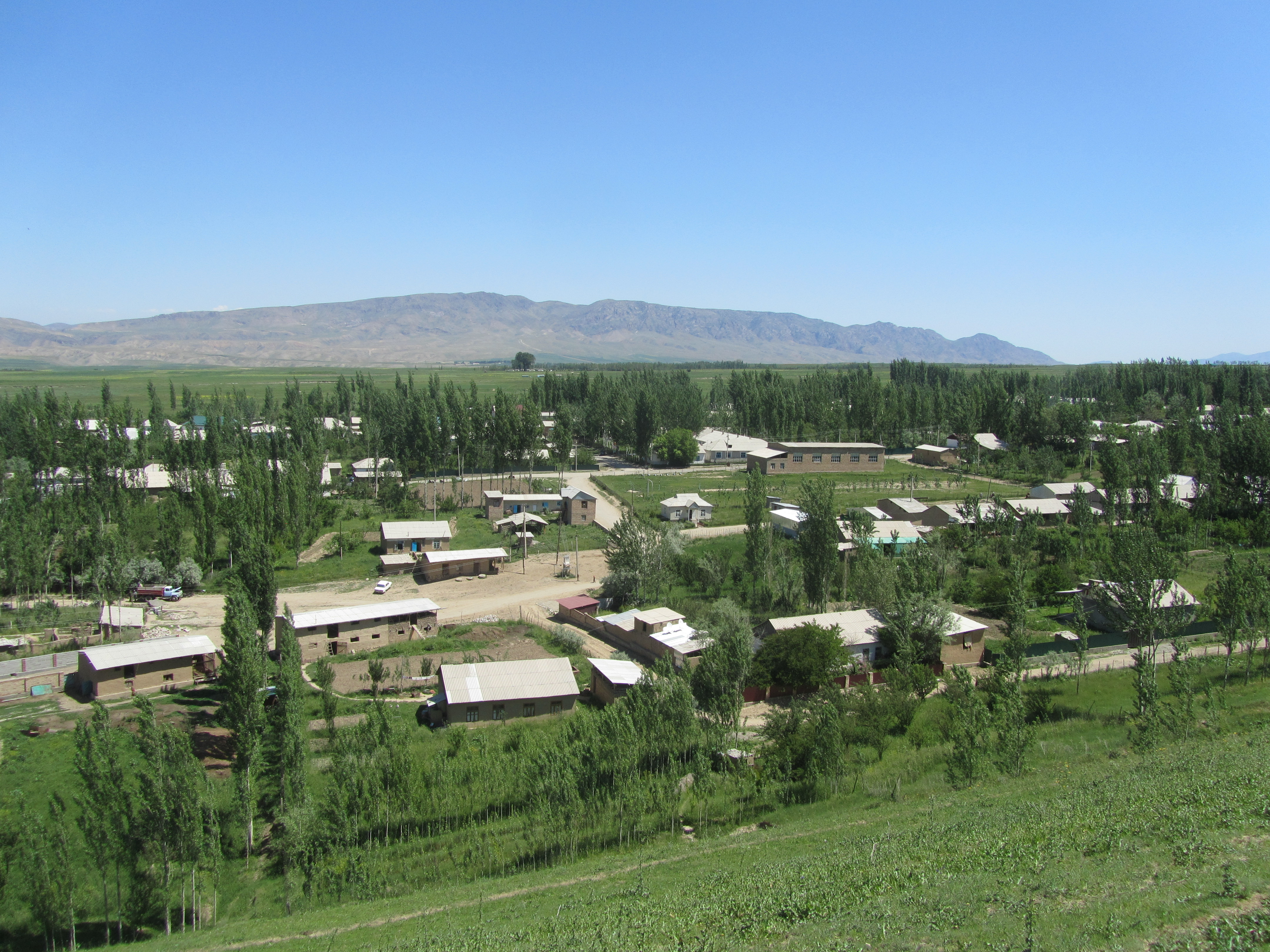

- Location in Kyrgyzstan
- Coordinates: 39°48′42.3″N 69°36′46.5″E
- Country: Kyrgyzstan
- Region: Batken
- District: Leylek

Area
  - Total: 0.28 km^{2} (0.11 sq mi)

Population (2021)
  - Total: 1,810
  - Density: 6,500/km^{2} (17,000/sq mi)
- Time zone: UTC+6 (KGT)

Altyn-Beshik (Kyrgyz: Алтын-Бешик), before 2025 Golbo (Kyrgyz: Голбо), is a village located in Batken Region, Kyrgyzstan. The village is subordinated to the town of Razzakov (Isfana) within the Leylek District. Its population was 1,810 in 2021.
