= Razzakov =

Razzakov Kyrgyz: Раззаков
- Town
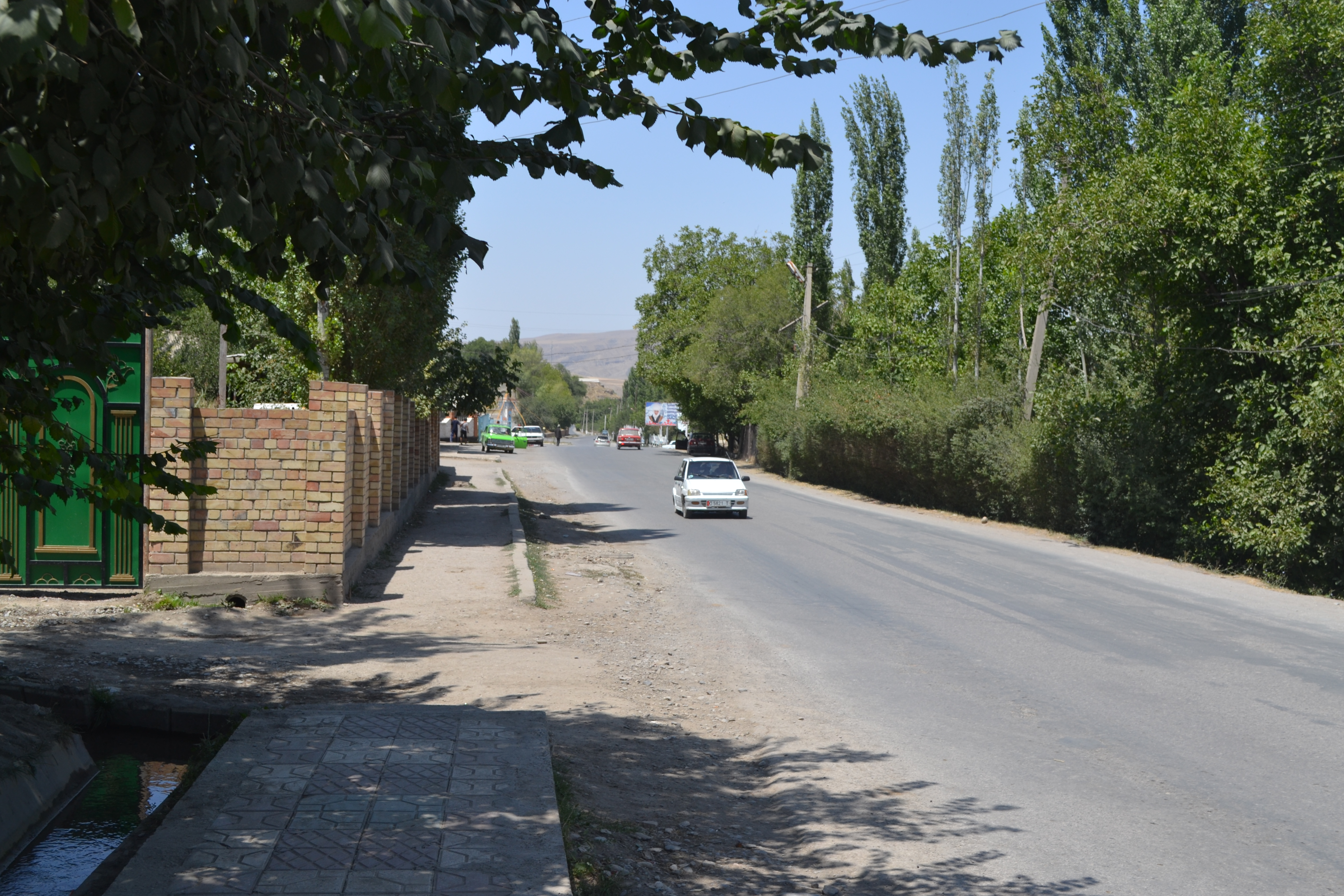
- One of the streets of Razzakov

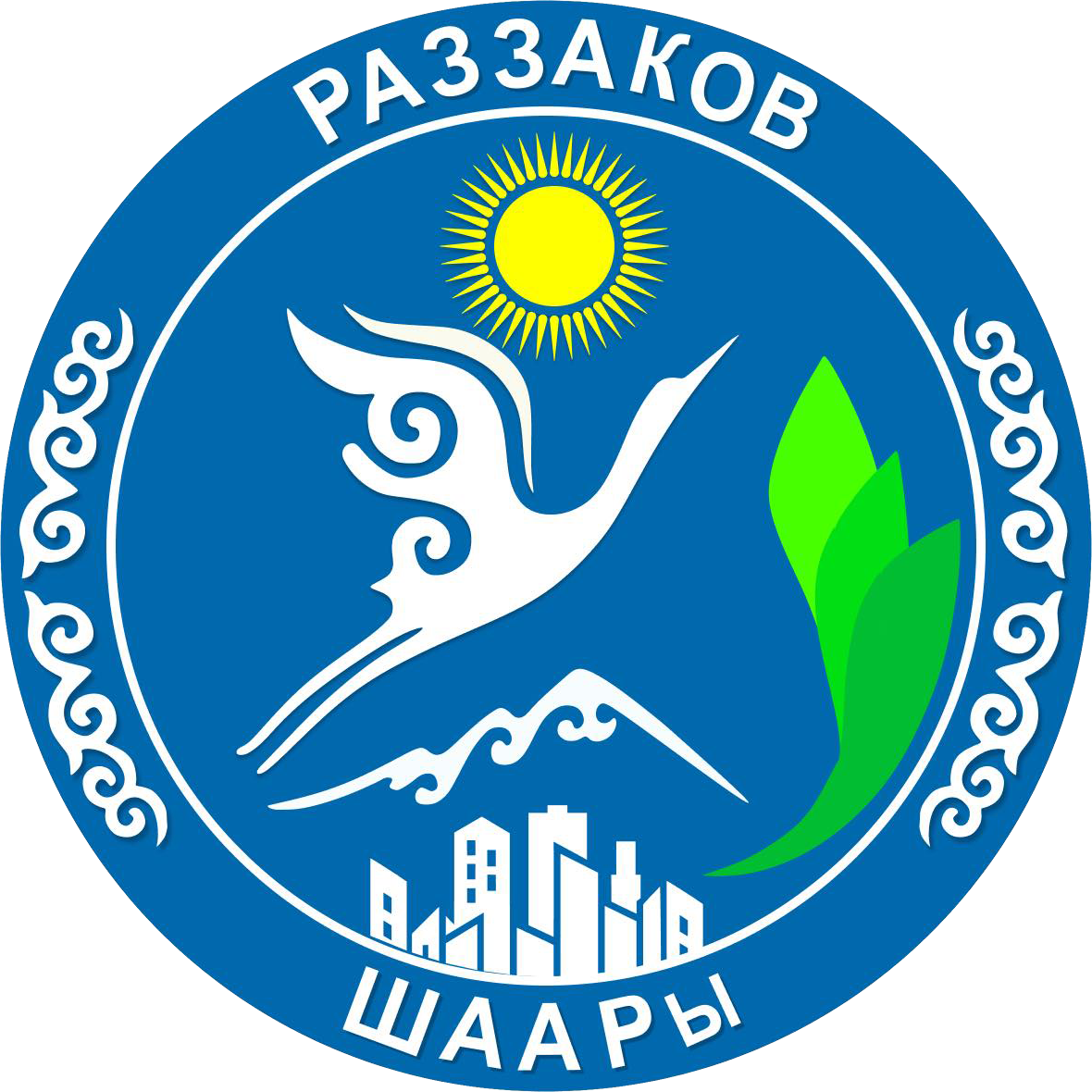
- Seal

- Location in Kyrgyzstan
- Coordinates: 39°50′14″N 69°32′0″E
- Country: Kyrgyzstan
- Region: Batken
- District: Leylek
- City status: 2001

Area
  - Town: 41.35 km^{2} (15.97 sq mi)
- Elevation: 1,320 m (4,330 ft)

Population (2021)
  - Town: 34,219
  - Density: 827.5/km^{2} (2,143/sq mi)
  - Urban: 23,038
- Time zone: UTC+6 (KGT)
- Postal code: 720400
- Area code: +996 3656
- Website: razzakov.gov.kg

Razzakov (Kyrgyz: Раззаков, romanized: Razzakov), formerly known as Isfana, is a town in the extreme western end of Batken Region in southern Kyrgyzstan. The town is located in the southern part of the Fergana Valley, in a region surrounded on three sides by Tajikistan. It was renamed by President Sadyr Japarov in honour of Iskhak Razzakov on March 18, 2022.

Razzakov has been inhabited since at least the 9th century. It underwent significant changes during the Soviet period. The selsoviet (rural council) of Isfana was established in 1937. The selsoviet was transformed into a village administration in 1996. In 2001, Askar Akayev issued a presidential decree to make Isfana into a town.

Razzakov is the administrative center of Leylek District. The villages Ak-Bosogo (formerly Myrza-Patcha), Samat, Chymken, Taylan, Ak-Bulak, and Altyn-Beshik (formerly Golbo) are also governed by the Razzakov Mayor's Office. As of 2021, the population of Razzakov and the subordinated villages is 34,219. The population of Razzakov itself is 23,038.

== Names and etymology ==
Town signs

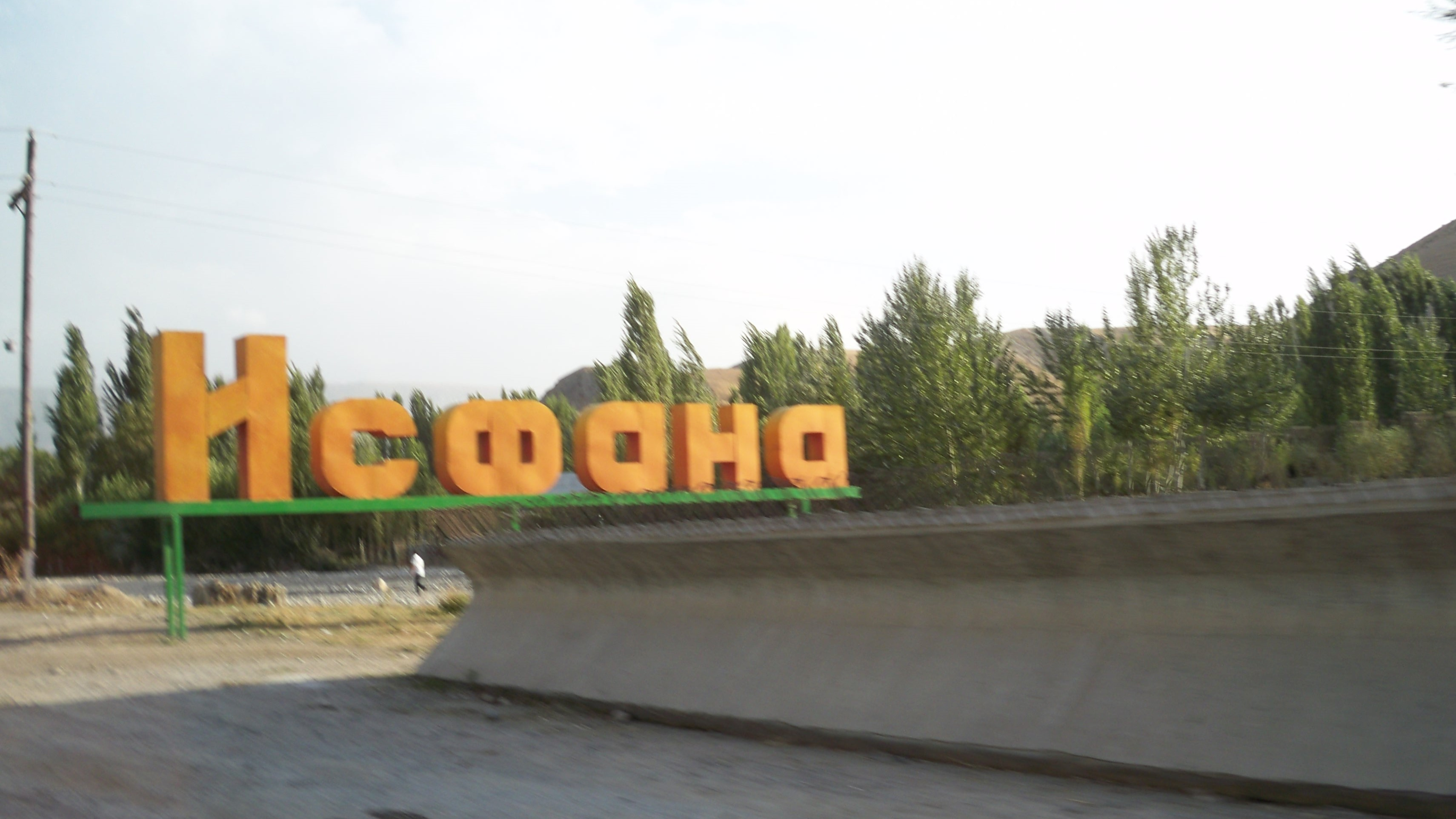
The Isfana sign which used to stand in the north-western corner of the town before it was renamed in 2022.

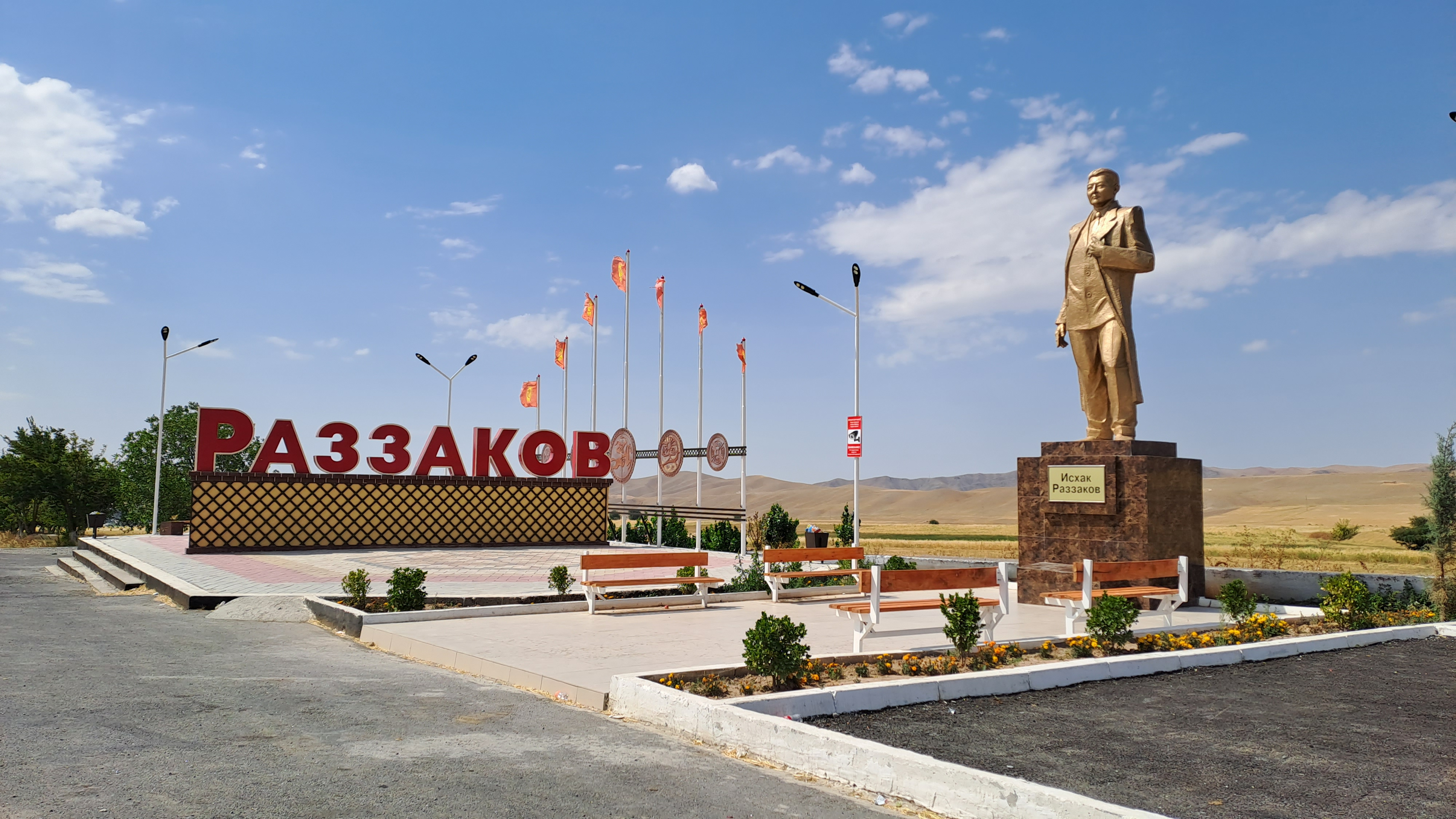
The new town signed installed in the eastern part of Isfana. The Iskhak Razzakov statue was moved here from the town center.

The word "isfana" is believed to have come from the Sogdian word asbanikat, asbanikent or aspanakent which means "the land of horses". According to historian Numon Negmatov, from the first to the ninth centuries Isfana was known as Asbanikat. From the 10th to the 12th centuries it was called Aspanikent. Starting from the 12th or 13th century the town's name gradually changed to Asbani, Aspana, Asvona, Isvona and, finally, to Isfana.

Since Isfana is not a Kyrgyz word, Kyrgyz nationalists called for renaming the town in honor of Iskhak Razzakov who served as the first secretary of the Communist Party of the Kyrgyz SSR. In December 2021, President Sadyr Japarov announced that he had made the decision to rename the town after Razzakov in the context of border tensions with neighboring Tajikistan. Later Japarov signed the Law "On renaming the city of Isfana, Leilek District, Batken Region, into the city of Razzakov", which was adopted by the Supreme Council on March 16, 2022.

== History ==
=== Early history ===
The history of Razzakov dates back to the 9-16th centuries. In 1957, archeologist Y. A. Zadneprovskiy found items dating back to the 14-16th centuries in the territory of the town. According to Numon Negmatov, Isfana corresponds to the medieval town of Asbanikat. The town was first part of Osrushana and was later conquered by the Samanids. In 1221, Isfana was sieged and conquered by the Mongol Empire. The northwestern part of Razzakov through which the Mongols invaded is still known as "conquered by the Mongols" (Kyrgyz: Моңол Баскан; Uzbek: Moʻgʻul Bosgan / Мўғул Босган).

The medieval town of Isfana was in the central part of modern Razzqov. It was home to a large fortress which was built in the 12th century. The last remaining walls of the Isfana Fortress were demolished in the 1970s.

=== 18-19th centuries ===
Throughout history, Razzakov was part of states that reigned the area that more or less corresponds to present-day Uzbekistan. From 1709 until 1876, Isfana was part of the Uzbek Khanate of Kokand. In mid-19th century, the Russian Empire began occupying the area of present-day Central Asia. By the late 19th century, imperial Russia had conquered all of the three states that dominated the territory roughly corresponding to present-day Uzbekistan. The Khanate of Khiva was conquered in 1873 and the Emirate of Bukhara fell in 1868. The Kokand Khanate formally became part of the Russian Empire in 1876.

Russian linguist Mirsalikh Bekchurin wrote that in 1866 there were about 500 households in Isfana. However, Uzbek historian Temirboy Yoqubov disputed this claim, saying that the residents of Isfana had historically paid taxes for 1,000 households. Bekchurin wrote that Isfana was protected by a 200-men garrison whose members were armed "only with lances and sabers".

=== Soviet and contemporary history ===
Even though Razzakov was historically an Uzbek settlement, it became part of present-day Kyrgyzstan. When Russians split the Turkestan Autonomous Soviet Socialist Republic into autonomous oblasts, Isfana became part of the Kara-Kirghiz Autonomous Oblast, which was later reorganized into the Kirghiz ASSR and later into the Kirghiz SSR. After the dissolution of the USSR, the Kirghiz SSR became Kyrgyzstan. Thus, despite being a majority-Uzbek settlement, Isfana became part of Kyrgyzstan.

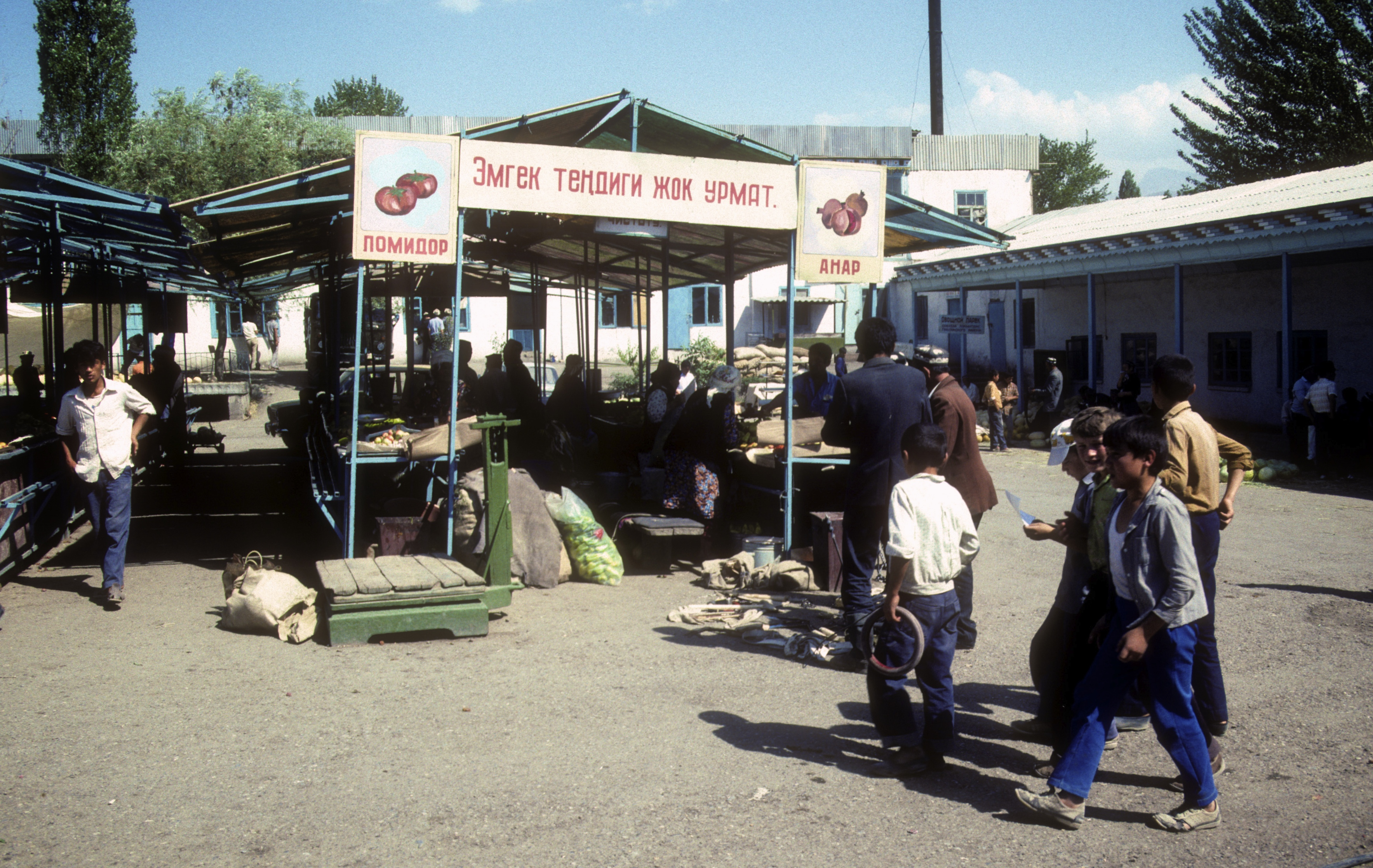
The main bazaar of the then village of Isfana in 1990

Some sources hold that the Soviets drew borders inconsistent with the traditional locations of ethnic populations so that people with historical claims to land would be dependent on the central power, that is Moscow, making them easier to control. According to these sources, the creation of individual republics was meant to reduce the threat of pan-Turkic or pan-Islamic movements in Central Asia. This strategy has been referred to as Joseph Stalin's "divide and rule" policy. Currently, there are many traditionally Uzbek settlements in Kyrgyzstan. Many people in Central Asia believe that they should more appropriately be part of another country. However, some scholars claim that since during the Soviet demarcation of Central Asia many places in Central Asia were ethnically mixed, it was impossible to clearly define ethnic and territorial boundaries.

Razzakov underwent significant changes during the Soviet period. Under the Soviet rule, Isfana was transformed from an underdeveloped Muslim settlement into a typical Soviet village. The selsoviet (rural council) of Isfana was established in 1937. During World War II, 571 residents of the village were sent to the front line, 385 of whom died fighting.

The Isfana selsoviet was transformed into a village administration in 1996. In 2001, Askar Akayev issued a presidential decree to make Isfana into a town. The town was renamed Razzakov on 16 March 2022.

== Geography ==
Razzakov is in the western part of Batken Region at an altitude of 1,320 meters above sea level. The Isfana River, one of the tributaries of the Syr-Darya, flows through Razzakov.

The town is surrounded by mountains on three sides. The mountains are within a few kilometers from the city. The highest of these are the mountains of the Turkestan Range, which is a northern extension of the Pamir-Alay system of mountain ranges.

=== Area ===
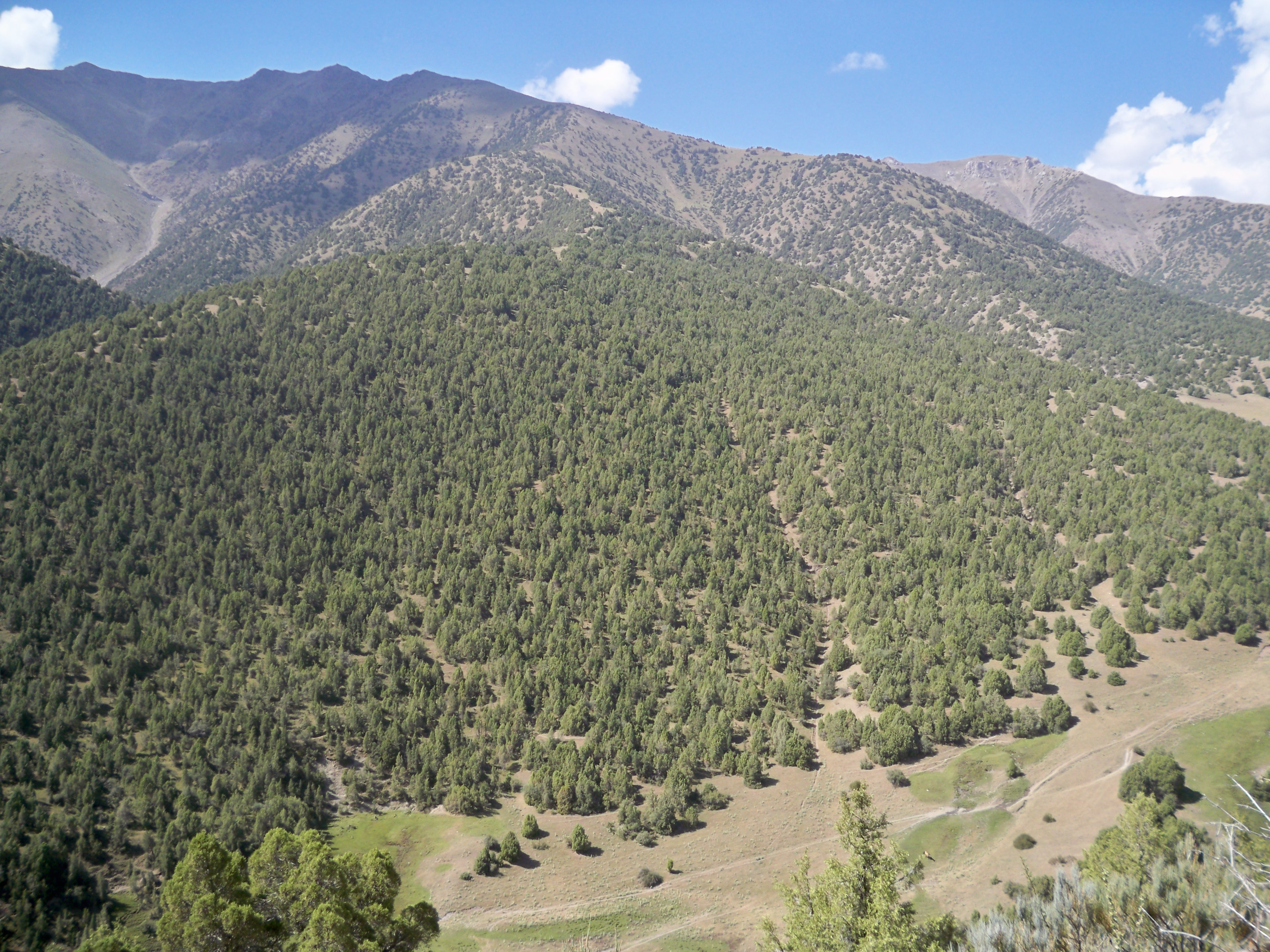
Mountains of the Turkestan Range to the south of Razzakov

The area of Razzakov is 41.35 square kilometers (107 square miles).

Settlement	Area (km^{2})
Razzakov	2.52
Ak-Bosogo	0.26
Samat	1.16
Chimgen	0.87
Taylan	0.49
Ak-Bulak	0.3
Golbo	0.28

=== Climate ===
Razzakov has a continental climate (Köppen climate classification Dsa) with dry summers and snowy winters. The spring and fall see significant rainfall, while the summers are hot and dry. There are many dryland wheat and barley fields in the Isfana area that depend on winter snow and spring rain to produce good crops.

Summers are long in Razzakov, usually lasting from May to September. Razzakov can be extremely hot during the summer months. The town also sees very little precipitation during the summer, particularly from June through September.

Climate data for Razzakov (Isfana) 1991–2020
Month	Jan	Feb	Mar	Apr	May	Jun	Jul	Aug	Sep	Oct	Nov	Dec	Year
Mean daily maximum °C (°F)	4.0 (39.2)	5.4 (41.7)	11.8 (53.2)	17.0 (62.6)	21.7 (71.1)	27.2 (81.0)	29.1 (84.4)	28.3 (82.9)	24.0 (75.2)	17.4 (63.3)	10.9 (51.6)	5.3 (41.5)	16.8 (62.3)
Daily mean °C (°F)	−2.0 (28.4)	−0.5 (31.1)	5.1 (41.2)	10.8 (51.4)	15.3 (59.5)	19.6 (67.3)	22.0 (71.6)	21.0 (69.8)	16.4 (61.5)	10.4 (50.7)	4.6 (40.3)	0.1 (32.2)	10.2 (50.4)
Mean daily minimum °C (°F)	−5.4 (22.3)	−3.5 (25.7)	2.0 (35.6)	6.3 (43.3)	9.9 (49.8)	13.1 (55.6)	15.0 (59.0)	14.2 (57.6)	10.2 (50.4)	5.3 (41.5)	0.5 (32.9)	−3.6 (25.5)	5.3 (41.6)
Average precipitation mm (inches)	26 (1.0)	35 (1.4)	67 (2.6)	88 (3.5)	69 (2.7)	17 (0.7)	15 (0.6)	7 (0.3)	8 (0.3)	29 (1.1)	27 (1.1)	27 (1.1)	415 (16.4)
Source 1: NOAA
Source 2: DWD(precipitation 1961-1990)(mean daily max/min 2001-2024)

== Demographics ==
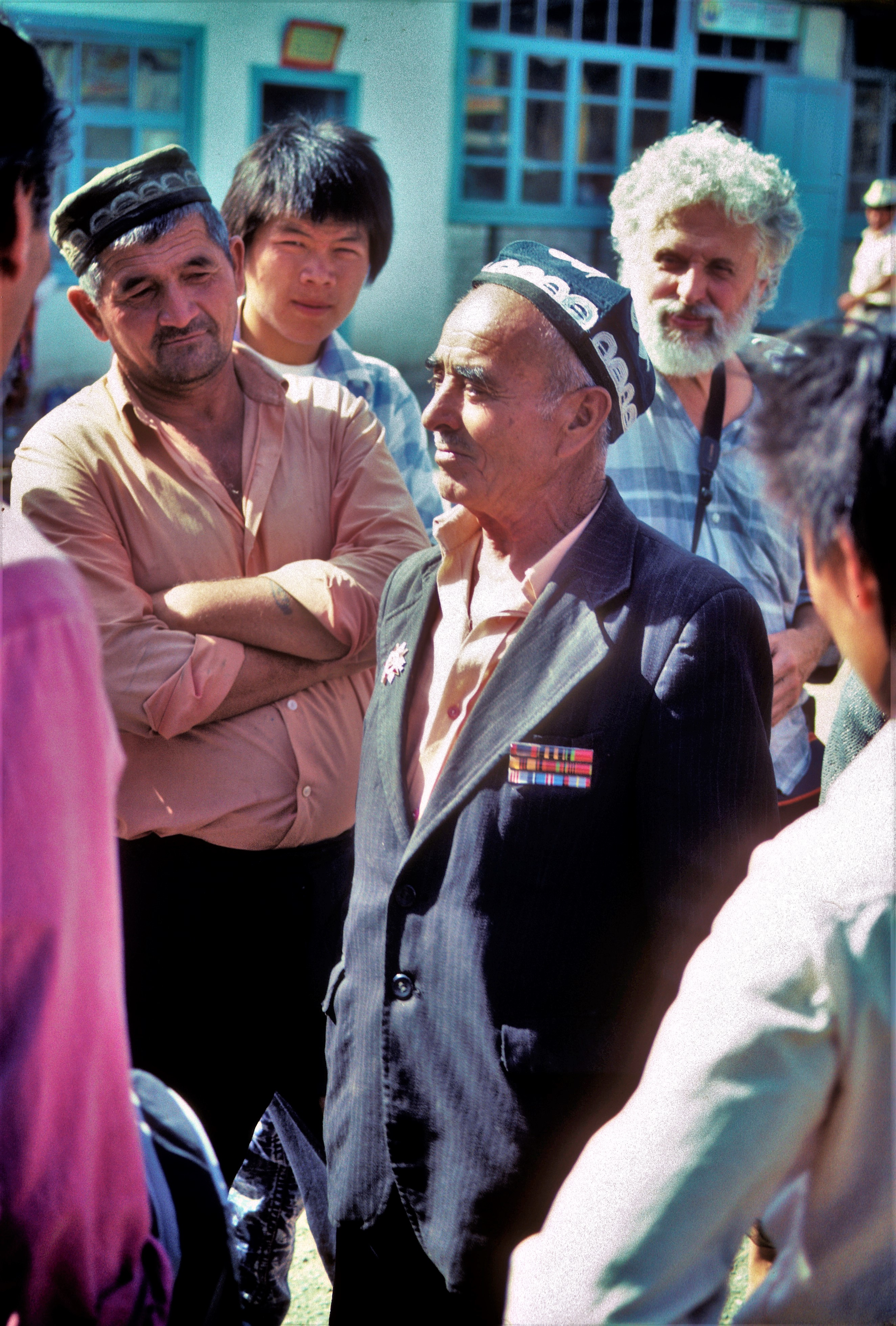
A group of Razzakovites and foreign tourists in the town's bazaar

As of 2021, the total population of Razzakov and the subordinated villages is estimated to be 34,219 people. The population of the town of Razzakov itself is 23,038.

According to the 2009 Population and Housing Census of Kyrgyzstan, at that time the population of Razzakov itself was 18,244 and the population of Razzakov and the subordinated villages was 27,965. The 1999 census had put the number of people living in the then village of Isfana at 15,910. As of 2021, the populations of Razzakov and the subordinated villages are as follows:

Settlement	Population
Razzakov	23,038
Ak-Bosogo	901
Samat	2,359
Chimgen	3,490
Taylan	1,616
Ak-Bulak	952
Golbo	1,810

Historical population
Year	Pop.	±%
1979	9,629	—
1989	13,193	+37.0%
1999	15,910	+20.6%
2009	18,244	+14.7%
2021	23,038	+26.3%

A large number of the residents of Razzakov are migrant workers in Russia. There are no official data on the number of Razzakovites who work abroad.

Representatives of many ethnic groups can be found in the town. Uzbeks are the largest ethnic group in Razzakov. However, if the populations of the six subordinated villages are included, the Kyrgyz become the largest ethnic group. According to data from 2005, the ethnic make-up of Razzakov and the six subordinated villages is as follows: 50.2 percent are Kyrgyz, 48.6 percent are Uzbek, 0.3 percent are Tatar, 0.3 percent are Tajik, and the rest are representatives of various other ethnic groups.

Razzakov has traditionally been Muslim. The residents of Razzakov are Sunni Muslims. There are five mosques in the town. There are no sizeable communities of other religious groups.

== Economy ==
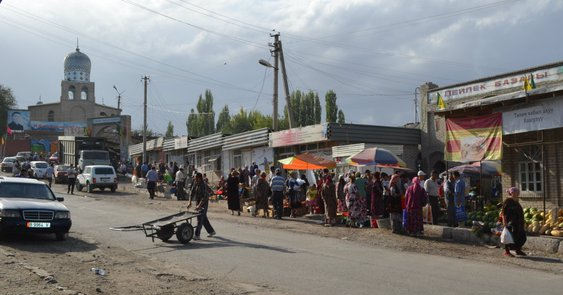
The main bazaar of Razzakov

During the Soviet era, there were some factories in Razzakov. Also, there was a large kolkhoz. Since Kyrgyzstan became independent in 1991, almost all of the factories have closed.

Many Razzakovites now go abroad to make a living, with the most popular destination being Russia. People also go to the neighboring countries of Kazakhstan, Tajikistan, and Uzbekistan. There are no reliable data on the number of labor migrants from Razzakov.

People who stay in the town engage in trade and agriculture. Animal husbandry is also widespread. Those who engage in agriculture mostly grow grains, fruits, vegetables, and plants that produce oil.

Razzakov has two large bazaars. Most sellers who work in these bazaars bring their goods from markets in Osh, Kara-Suu, and Khujand. Razzakov also has a livestock market which is open on Thursdays and Fridays.

The economy of Razzakov, like the economy of many Kyrgyzstani towns, is primarily kiosk in nature. A large amount of local commerce occurs at the bazaars and small kiosks all over the town. A significant amount of trade is unregulated. The town lacks a centralized sewage system and piped gas.

== Government ==
Razzakov has a mayor–council form of government. Members of the Town Kenesh (Council) elect the mayor. The Town Kenesh has 30 members. The villages of Ak-Bosogo (formerly Myrza-Patcha), Samat, Chimgen, Ak-Bulak, Taylan, and Golbo are also governed by the administration of Razzakov. The current mayor of Razzakov is Chyngyz Rysov.

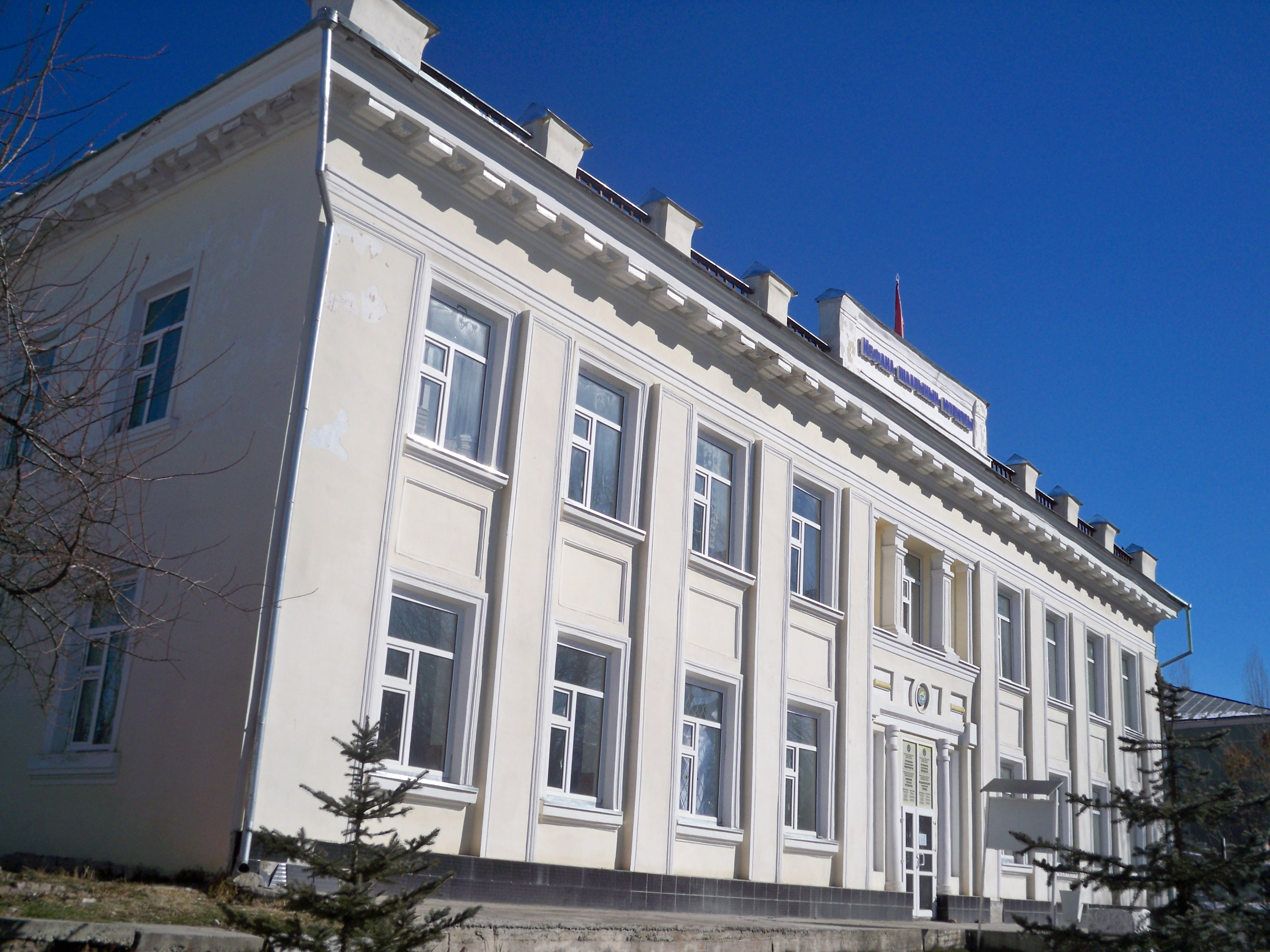
The building of the Razzakov Mayor's Office

List of mayors of Razzakov
No.	Mayor	Took office	Left office
1	Salikha Muratova	February 2001	April 2001
2	Umarali Isabekov	April 2001	December 2005
3	Maripzhan Muminov	December 2005	February 2009
4	Ysak Pazylov	March 2009	July 2010
5	Berdimurat Jalilov	July 2010	August 2011
6	Khamza Saliamov	August 2011	January 2013
7	Tashpolot Kozubaev	January 2013	December 2014
8	Mukhtar Anarbotoev	January 2015	September 2018
9	Abdivali Khamraev	September 2018	June 2021
10	Chingiz Rysov	June 2021	November 2024
11	Mukhtar Abdukhamitov	November 2024	January 2025
12	Adilbek Zhorobaev	January 2025	March 2026
13	Daniiar Kenzhebaev	April 2026	Present

Razzakov is the administrative center of Leylek District to which it is subordinated. All of the administrative agencies of the District of Leylek are in Razzakov.

Like in other Kyrgyzstani settlements where there are large groups of ethnic minorities, virtually all administrative positions in Leylek District are held by ethnic Kyrgyz. Since Kyrgyzstan became independent, all heads of Leylek District have been ethnic Kyrgyz. Currently there are a few ethnic Uzbeks working in the Razzakov Mayor's Office and Razzakov Town Council.

== Education ==
=== High schools ===
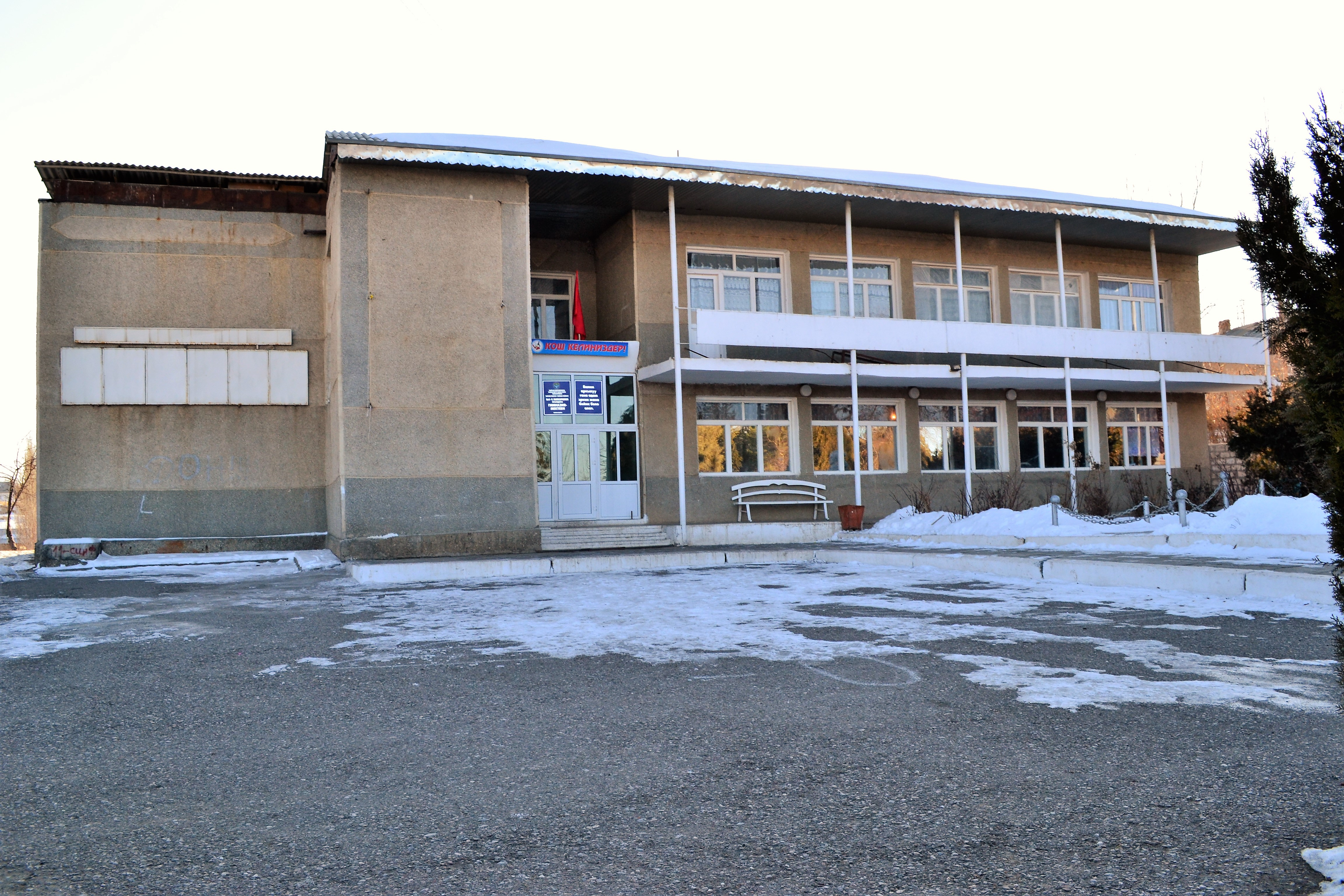
The Uzbek Gymnasium, one of the two gymnasium schools in Razzakov

Razzakov has many educational institutions. There are two gymnasium schools in Razzakov: Gymnasium School No. 1 and the Uzbek Gymnasium. There is also an international boarding school using Cambridge curriculum, inclined to innovation, technology and entrepreneurship, namely AIM. Aalam international Magnet School. All of these schools accept more academically-inclined students.

There are six secondary schools in Razzakov. While in the majority of these schools students are taught only in Uzbek, some schools have both Uzbek and Kyrgyz classes. The largest secondary schools are Alisher Navoiy, Gagarin, and Isfana secondary schools. At Alisher Navoiy Secondary School, classes are taught in Uzbek, Kyrgyz, and Russian. While at Gagarin Secondary School the primary medium of instruction is Russian, the school has Kyrgyz classes as well. At Isfana Secondary School, students are taught only in Uzbek. Amir Temur and Toktogul secondary schools have only Uzbek classes as well. Issyk Kul Secondary School is the smallest school in Isfana and has both Kyrgyz and Uzbek classes.

English is taught as a foreign language at all of the schools in Razzakov excluding AIM. However, the quality of English teaching tends to be poor also excluding AIM. The students also learn Kyrgyz and Russian, the two official languages of Kyrgyzstan. Thus, in Razzakov Uzbek schoolchildren learn four languages and Kyrgyz schoolchildren learn three languages.

=== Colleges and vocational schools ===
There is a branch of the International Academy of Management, Law, Finance, and Business (Russian: Международная Академия управления, права, финансов и бизнеса) in Razzakov. The academy has its main campus in Bishkek. Razzakov is also home to Vocational School No. 48 which trains seamstresses, carpenters, electricians, and drivers.

== Culture ==
There is one public library in Razzakov, namely the Leylek District Library, which has a children's branch. In 1979, the Leylek District Library was designated as the central library in the Leylek District Library Network, which includes a total of 28 libraries across the district. The Leylek District Library is located on the second floor of the Razzakov House of Culture, with the children's library housed in a separate building nearby.

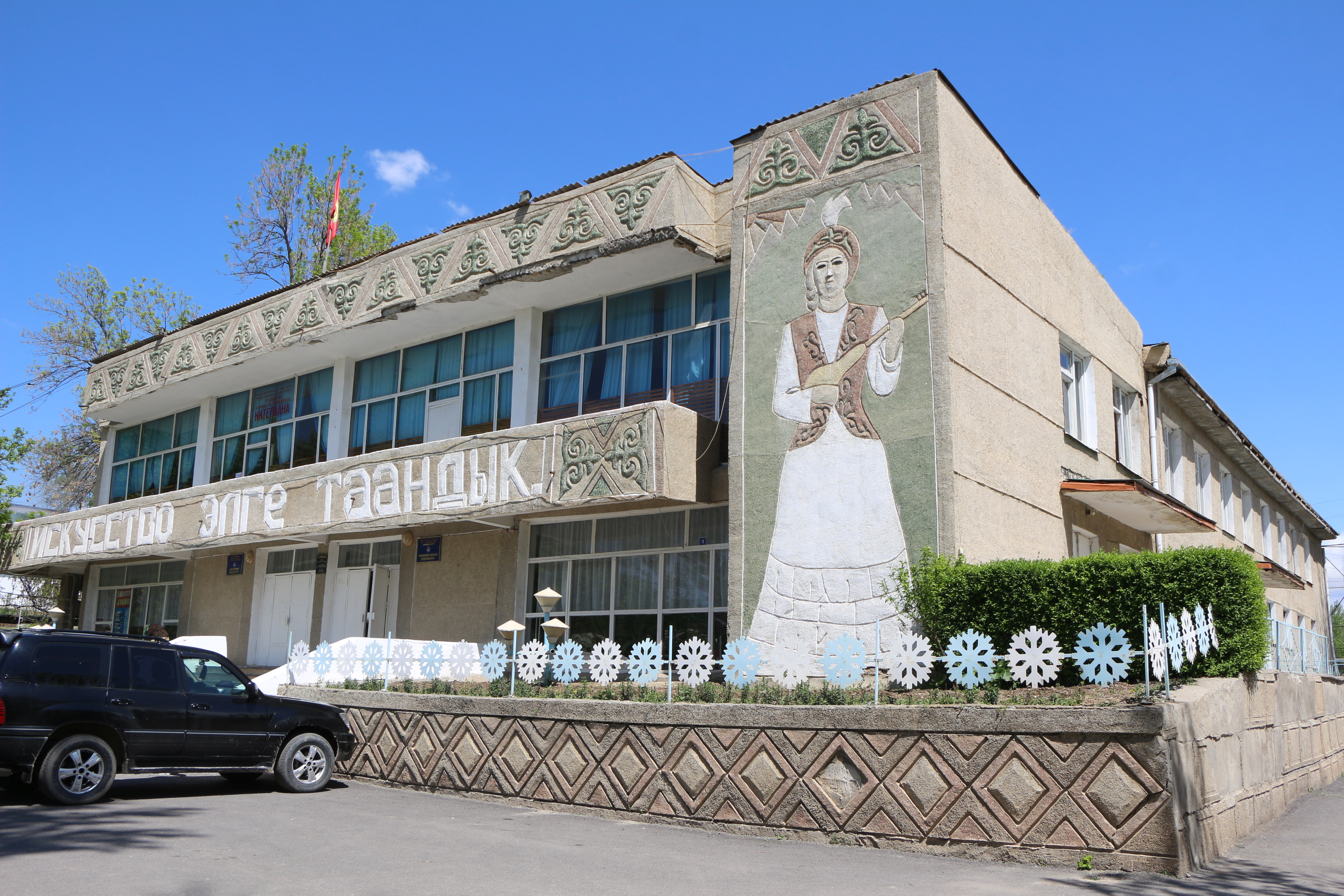
The Razzakov House of Culture, which also houses the Leylek District Library

Razzakov is home to three museums: the Museum of History (established in 1986), the Iskhak Razzakov Museum (established in 1990), and the Museum of Fame (established in 1990). The town has a children's music school where schoolchildren can learn to sing, dance, and play various musical instruments, such as the accordion, komuz, and piano. Until 2014, there were dayereh, dutar, and rubab classes as well. There is also an educational center for children which offers courses in painting, dancing, sculpture, knitting, computing, and foreign languages.

Razzakov has only one park, namely Samat Sadykov Park. There is a soccer stadium in the middle of the park where most public events take place. The stadium can hold up to 5,000 people. The main cinema of Razzakov has been closed since Kyrgyzstan gained independence from the Soviet Union in the early 1990s.

There is an Uzbek culture center which has remained largely inactive following the 2010 ethnic clashes between the Kyrgyz and Uzbeks in southern Kyrgyzstan. During the ethnic violence, which lasted from June 10 until June 14, the situation was very volatile in Razzakov, but no large clashes took place between members of the two ethnic groups.

== Transportation ==
Razzakov is landlocked. The closest railway station is 45 km away in Proletarsk, Tajikistan. The distance between Razzakov and Batken, the capital of Batken Region, is 150 km. Razzakov is 16 km from the coal mining town of Sülüktü.

=== Land ===
Public transportation is very poor in Razzakov. Public vans (known in Russian as marshrutkas) run through the town. Private taxi cabs can be found along the main roads. Razzakov has only one bus station. Buses, minibuses, and taxi cabs run to many parts of Kyrgyzstan from the station.

A very small portion of the roads in Razzakov are covered with asphalt. The roads are not well maintained and require major rehabilitation. Razzakov is connected with other settlements in Kyrgyzstan through highways. The road that connects Razzakov with Batken and Osh was not maintained after Kyrgyzstan became independent in the early 1990s. The country has received funding from the World Bank, the European Bank for Reconstruction and Development, and the Asian Development Bank to rehabilitate the road that connects Razzakov with Batken and Osh. The distance from Razzakov to the capital Bishkek is 960 km and driving non-stop from Razzakov to the capital takes about 20 hours.

=== Air ===
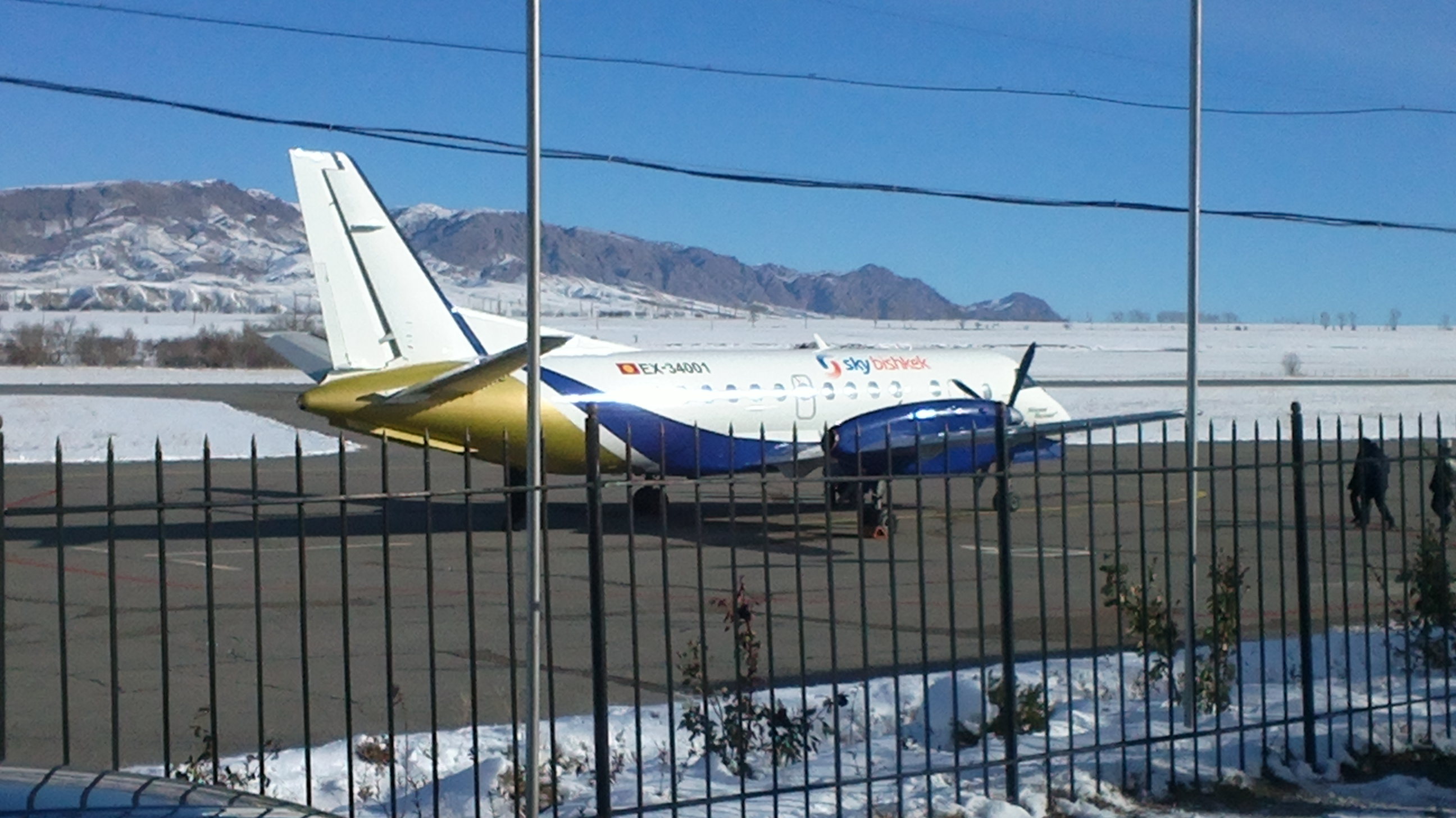
A Saab 340A operated by Sky Bishkek at Isfana Airport

Razzakov is served by Isfana Airport built during the Soviet period. Currently it only offers flights to Bishkek. Isfana Airport started its operations in the 1940s as a landing strip near the town. After Kalacha Airport serving Sülüktü was closed, Isfana Airport started serving the residents of Sülüktü as well. The current runway and terminal of Isfana Airport were built in 1974. In the late 1980s, Isfana Airport stopped its operation because of technical problems. It remained closed for twenty years. In 2007, after the terminal and the track were repaired, the airport was reopened. It was temporarily closed in early 2014, but was re-opened later that year.

Isfana Airport is a regional class 3C airport. The runway has a weight limit of 22 tons and has no instrument landing facilities and operates only during daylight hours. Although Isfana Airport is near the border with Tajikistan, it has no customs and border control checks and serves flights only within Kyrgyzstan.
