= Double shift school =

Type of school

Double shift school is a type of school which operates in two shifts, with one group of students in the building early in the day and a second group of students later in the day. The purpose of a double shift school is to increase the number of students that can be taught without having to build another building. To avoid crowded classrooms, a school may adopt a dual shift system without reducing the student's actual study time.
