= Langar =

Langar may refer to:

== Community eating ==
- Langar (Sikhism)
- Langar (Sufism)

== Places ==
=== Afghanistan ===
- Langar, Badakhshan, Afghanistan
- Langar, Bamyan, Afghanistan
- Langar, Faryab, Afghanistan
- Langar, Herat, Afghanistan
- Langar, Wardak, Afghanistan

=== Iran ===
- Langar, Kerman, Kerman Province
- Langar, Rabor, Kerman Province
- Langar-e Jadid, Khuzestan Province
- Langar-e Qadim, Khuzestan Province
- Langar, Kurdistan, Kurdistan Province
- Langar, Mazandaran, Mazandaran Province
- Langar, Bojnord, North Khorasan Province
- Langar, Maneh and Samalqan, North Khorasan Province
- Langar, Khoshab, Razavi Khorasan Province
- Langar, Torbat-e Jam, Razavi Khorasan Province
- Langar, Torqabeh and Shandiz, Razavi Khorasan Province
- Langar, Sistan and Baluchestan, Sistan and Baluchestan Province

=== Pakistan ===
- Langar, Punjab Pakistan

=== Tajikistan ===
- Langar, Kuhistoni Mastchoh
- Langar, Spitamen

=== United Kingdom ===
- Langar, Nottinghamshire, a village in Nottinghamshire, England

- Langar cum Barnstone, a civil parish in Nottinghamshire
- RAF Langar, a former Royal Air Force base located near the village
- British Parachute Schools, a parachuting drop zone which operates at the former RAF base

=== Uzbekistan ===
- Langar, Fergana Region, a village in Fergana Region
