= Farsiyeh =

Farsiyeh (Persian: فارسيه or فرسيه) may refer to:

- Farsiyeh, Ahvaz, Khuzestan Province
- Farsiyeh, Shushtar, Khuzestan Province
- Farsiyeh 2, Khuzestan Province
- Farsiyeh, Razavi Khorasan
