= Shahrak-e Shahid Beheshti =

Shahrak-e Shahid Beheshti (Persian: شهرك شهيدبهشتي) may refer to:

- Shahrak-e Shahid Beheshti, Fars
- Shahrak-e Shahid Beheshti, Dezful, Khuzestan Province
- Shahrak-e Shahid Beheshti, Shushtar, Khuzestan Province
- Shahrak-e Shahid Beheshti, Razavi Khorasan
- Shahrak-e Shahid Beheshti, Bampur, Sistan and Baluchestan Province
- Shahrak-e Shahid Beheshti, Hirmand, Sistan and Baluchestan Province
