= Hajj Khassaf =

Hajj Khassaf حاج خصاف
- Village
- Location within Iran
- Coordinates: 31°44′37″N 48°57′13″E
- Country: Iran
- Province: Khuzestan
- County: Shushtar
- Bakhsh: Central
- Rural District: Miyan Ab

Population (2006)
  - Total: 87
- Time zone: UTC+3:30 (IRST)
  - Summer (DST): UTC+4:30 (IRDT)

Hajj Khassaf (Persian: حاج خصاف, also Romanized as Ḩājj Khaşşāf) is a village in Miyan Ab Rural District, in the Central District of Shushtar County, Khuzestan Province, Iran. At the 2006 census, its population was 87, in 11 families.
