= Qerqereh-ye Malaki =

Qerqereh-ye Malaki قرقره ملكي
- Village
- Location within Iran
- Coordinates: 32°02′43″N 48°48′55″E
- Country: Iran
- Province: Khuzestan
- County: Shushtar
- Bakhsh: Central
- Rural District: Sardarabad

Population (2006)
  - Total: 1,079
- Time zone: UTC+3:30 (IRST)
  - Summer (DST): UTC+4:30 (IRDT)

Qerqereh-ye Malaki (Persian: قرقره ملكي, also Romanized as Qerqereh-ye Malakī; also known as Bonah-ye Malakī, Qarqareh, Qarqareh-ye Mehdī, and Qorqore) is a village in Sardarabad Rural District, in the Central District of Shushtar County, Khuzestan Province, Iran. At the 2006 census, its population was 1,079, in 169 families.
