= Shahrak-e Shoeyb Nabi =

Shahrak-e Shoeyb Nabi شهرك شعيب نبي
- Village
- Country: Iran
- Province: Khuzestan
- County: Shushtar
- Bakhsh: Shadravan
- Rural District: Shoaybiyeh-ye Gharbi

Population (2006)
  - Total: 499
- Time zone: UTC+3:30 (IRST)
  - Summer (DST): UTC+4:30 (IRDT)

Shahrak-e Shoeyb Nabi (Persian: شهرك شعيب نبي, also Romanized as Shahrak-e Sho‘eyb Nabī) is a village in Shoaybiyeh-ye Gharbi Rural District, Shadravan District, Shushtar County, Khuzestan Province, Iran. At the 2006 census, its population was 499, in 80 families.
