= Sheykh Shams ol Din =

Sheykh Shams ol Din شيخ شمس الدين
- Village
- Location within Iran
- Coordinates: 32°03′38″N 48°52′20″E
- Country: Iran
- Province: Khuzestan
- County: Shushtar
- Bakhsh: Central
- Rural District: Shahid Modarres

Population (2006)
  - Total: 899
- Time zone: UTC+3:30 (IRST)
  - Summer (DST): UTC+4:30 (IRDT)

Sheykh Shams ol Din (Persian: شيخ شمس الدين, also Romanized as Sheykh Shams ol Dīn; also known as Sheykh Shamseddīn) is a village in Shahid Modarres Rural District, in the Central District of Shushtar County, Khuzestan Province, Iran. At the 2006 census, its population was 899, in 169 families.
