= Ney Siah =

Ney Siah ني سياه
- Village
- Location within Iran
- Coordinates: 31°59′12″N 48°44′50″E
- Country: Iran
- Province: Khuzestan
- County: Shushtar
- Bakhsh: Shadravan
- Rural District: Shoaybiyeh-ye Gharbi

Population (2006)
  - Total: 244
- Time zone: UTC+3:30 (IRST)
  - Summer (DST): UTC+4:30 (IRDT)

Ney Siah (Persian: ني سياه, also Romanized as Ney Sīāh, Ney Seyāh, and Ney Siyah) is a village in Shoaybiyeh-ye Gharbi Rural District, Shadravan District, Shushtar County, Khuzestan Province, Iran. At the 2006 census, its population was 244, in 41 families.
