= Korai, Iran =

Korai or Karai (Persian: كرايي), also rendered as Korahi, may refer to:

- Karai, Iran, Fars Province
- Korai, Marvdasht, Fars Province
- Korai-ye Olya, Khuzestan Province
- Korai-ye Sofla, Khuzestan Province
