= Yasarat =

Yasarat يسارات
- Village
- Location within Iran
- Coordinates: 31°58′56″N 48°48′10″E
- Country: Iran
- Province: Khuzestan
- County: Shushtar
- Bakhsh: Central
- Rural District: Miyan Ab-e Shomali

Population (2006)
  - Total: 107
- Time zone: UTC+3:30 (IRST)
  - Summer (DST): UTC+4:30 (IRDT)

Yasarat (Persian: يسارات, also Romanized as Yasārāt; also known as Yassāra) is a village in Miyan Ab-e Shomali Rural District, in the Central District of Shushtar County, Khuzestan Province, Iran. At the 2006 census, its population was 107, in 21 families.
