= Shahrak-e Nur Mohammadi =

Shahrak-e Nur Mohammadi شهرك نورمحمدي
- Village
- Location within Iran
- Coordinates: 32°00′26″N 48°49′53″E
- Country: Iran
- Province: Khuzestan
- County: Shushtar
- Bakhsh: Central
- Rural District: Miyan Ab-e Shomali

Population (2006)
  - Total: 4,256
- Time zone: UTC+3:30 (IRST)
  - Summer (DST): UTC+4:30 (IRDT)

Shahrak-e Nur Mohammadi (Persian: شهرك نورمحمدي, also Romanized as Shahrak-e Nūr Moḩammadī; also known as Shahrak-gelalak) is a village in Miyan Ab-e Shomali Rural District, in the Central District of Shushtar County, Khuzestan Province, Iran. At the 2006 census, its population was 4,256, in 800 families.
