= Mehdiabad, Shushtar =

Village in Khuzestan province, Iran

Mehdiabad Persian: مهدي اباد
- Village
- Location within Iran
- Coordinates: 31°57′30″N 48°51′22″E
- Country: Iran
- Province: Khuzestan
- County: Shushtar
- District: Miyan Ab
- Rural District: Miyan Ab-e Shomali

Population (2016)
  - Total: 1,726
- Time zone: UTC+3:30 (IRST)

Mehdiabad (Persian: مهدي اباد) (Note: Also romanized as Mehdīābād; also known as Mihdiābād) is a village in, and the capital of, Miyan Ab-e Shomali Rural District of Miyan Ab District, Shushtar County, Khuzestan province, Iran.

== Demographics ==
=== Population ===
At the time of the 2006 National Census, the village's population was 1,736 in 378 households, when it was in the Central District. The following census in 2011 counted 1,734 people in 445 households. The 2016 census measured the population of the village as 1,726 people in 488 households, by which time the rural district had been separated from the district in the formation of Miyan Ab District.
