= Dolfiyeh =

Dolfiyeh دلفيه
- Village
- Location within Iran
- Coordinates: 31°47′11″N 48°53′19″E
- Country: Iran
- Province: Khuzestan
- County: Shushtar
- Bakhsh: Central
- Rural District: Miyan Ab

Population (2006)
  - Total: 164
- Time zone: UTC+3:30 (IRST)
  - Summer (DST): UTC+4:30 (IRDT)

Dolfiyeh (Persian: دلفيه, also Romanized as Dolfīyeh and Delfīyeh) is a village in Miyan Ab Rural District, in the Central District of Shushtar County, Khuzestan Province, Iran. At the 2006 census, its population was 164, in 33 families.
