= Neshar-ye Do =

Neshar-ye Do نشاردو
- Village
- Location within Iran
- Coordinates: 31°41′29″N 48°49′21″E
- Country: Iran
- Province: Khuzestan
- County: Shushtar
- Bakhsh: Shadravan
- Rural District: Shoaybiyeh-ye Sharqi

Population (2006)
  - Total: 101
- Time zone: UTC+3:30 (IRST)
  - Summer (DST): UTC+4:30 (IRDT)

Neshar-ye Do (Persian: نشاردو, also Romanized as Neshār-ye Do; also known as Neshāreh and Neshāreh-ye Do) is a village in Shoaybiyeh-ye Sharqi Rural District, Shadravan District, Shushtar County, Khuzestan Province, Iran. At the 2006 census, its population was 101, in 15 families.
