= Zoviyeh =

Zoviyeh or Zoveyeh (Persian: زويه) may refer to:

- Zoviyeh-ye Yek-e Olya
- Zoviyeh-ye Yek-e Sofla
- Zoviyeh-ye Do
