= Qol Rumzi =

Qol Rumzi قل رومزي
- Village
- Location within Iran
- Coordinates: 31°57′09″N 48°54′21″E
- Country: Iran
- Province: Khuzestan
- County: Shushtar
- Bakhsh: Central
- Rural District: Miyan Ab-e Shomali

Population (2006)
  - Total: 528
- Time zone: UTC+3:30 (IRST)
  - Summer (DST): UTC+4:30 (IRDT)

Qol Rumzi (Persian: قل رومزي, also Romanized as Qol Rūmzī; also known as Ghol Roomazi, Qalromezī, Qol Ramzī, Qolrowmezī, Qol Rūmz, and Qurūmizi) is a village in Miyan Ab-e Shomali Rural District, in the Central District of Shushtar County, Khuzestan Province, Iran. At the 2006 census, its population was 528, in 100 families.
