= Jijil =

Jijil جيجيل
- Village
- Location within Iran
- Coordinates: 32°01′10″N 48°55′40″E
- Country: Iran
- Province: Khuzestan
- County: Shushtar
- Bakhsh: Central
- Rural District: Shahid Modarres

Population (2006)
  - Total: 19
- Time zone: UTC+3:30 (IRST)
  - Summer (DST): UTC+4:30 (IRDT)

Jijil (Persian: جيجيل, also Romanized as Jījīl; also known as Jījel) is a village in Shahid Modarres Rural District, in the Central District of Shushtar County, Khuzestan Province, Iran. At the 2006 census, its population was 19, in 5 families.
