= Chamm ol Hamid =

Chamm ol Hamid چم الحميد
- Village
- Location within Iran
- Coordinates: 31°41′04″N 48°51′15″E
- Country: Iran
- Province: Khuzestan
- County: Shushtar
- Bakhsh: Shadravan
- Rural District: Shoaybiyeh-ye Sharqi

Population (2006)
  - Total: 666
- Time zone: UTC+3:30 (IRST)
  - Summer (DST): UTC+4:30 (IRDT)

Chamm ol Hamid (Persian: چم الحميد, also Romanized as Chamm ol Ḩamīd and Cham ol Ḩamīd) is a village in Shoaybiyeh-ye Sharqi Rural District, Shadravan District, Shushtar County, Khuzestan Province, Iran. At the 2006 census, its population was 666, in 91 families.
