= Yahmureh =

Yahmureh or Yohmureh (Persian: يحموره) may refer to:

- Yahmureh 1
- Yahmureh 2
- Yahmureh 3
