= Kuleh Jaz =

Kuleh Jaz كوله جاز
- Village
- Location within Iran
- Coordinates: 32°07′00″N 48°45′39″E
- Country: Iran
- Province: Khuzestan
- County: Shushtar
- Bakhsh: Central
- Rural District: Sardarabad

Population (2006)
  - Total: 1,121
- Time zone: UTC+3:30 (IRST)
  - Summer (DST): UTC+4:30 (IRDT)

Kuleh Jaz (Persian: كوله جاز, also Romanized as Kūleh Jāz; also known as Kooljaz, Kūleh Jār, and Kūlī Jāz) is a village in Sardarabad Rural District, in the Central District of Shushtar County, Khuzestan Province, Iran. At the 2006 census, its population was 1,121, in 200 families.
