= Abgah, Khuzestan =

Abgah ابگاه
- Village
- Location within Iran
- Coordinates: 31°58′33″N 49°04′39″E
- Country: Iran
- Province: Khuzestan
- County: Shushtar
- Bakhsh: Central
- Rural District: Shahid Modarres

Population (2006)
  - Total: 41
- Time zone: UTC+3:30 (IRST)
  - Summer (DST): UTC+4:30 (IRDT)

Abgah (Persian: ابگاه, also Romanized as Ābgāh) is a village in Shahid Modarres Rural District, in the Central District of Shushtar County, Khuzestan Province, Iran. At the 2006 census, its population was 41, in 8 families.
