= Seh Boneh-ye Olya =

Seh Boneh-ye Olya سه بنه عليا
- Village
- Location within Iran
- Coordinates: 31°55′54″N 48°53′33″E
- Country: Iran
- Province: Khuzestan
- County: Shushtar
- Bakhsh: Central
- Rural District: Miyan Ab-e Shomali

Population (2006)
  - Total: 49
- Time zone: UTC+3:30 (IRST)
  - Summer (DST): UTC+4:30 (IRDT)

Seh Boneh-ye Olya (Persian: سه بنه عليا, also Romanized as Seh Boneh-ye ‘Olyā; also known as Seh Boneh and Seh Boneh-ye Bālā) is a village in Miyan Ab-e Shomali Rural District, in the Central District of Shushtar County, Khuzestan Province, Iran. At the 2006 census, its population was 49, in 8 families.
