= Seh Boneh =

Seh Boneh سه بنه
- Village
- Location within Iran
- Coordinates: 31°55′37″N 48°53′12″E
- Country: Iran
- Province: Khuzestan
- County: Shushtar
- Bakhsh: Central
- Rural District: Miyan Ab-e Shomali

Population (2006)
  - Total: 392
- Time zone: UTC+3:30 (IRST)
  - Summer (DST): UTC+4:30 (IRDT)

Seh Boneh (Persian: سه بنه; also known as Seh Boneh-ye Pā’īn and Seh Boneh-ye Soflá) is a village in Miyan Ab-e Shomali Rural District, in the Central District of Shushtar County, Khuzestan Province, Iran. At the 2006 census, its population was 392, in 77 families.
