= Gavmishabad-e Sheykh Hosun =

Gavmishabad-e Sheykh Hosun گاوميش ابادشيخ حسون
- Village
- Country: Iran
- Province: Khuzestan
- County: Shushtar
- Bakhsh: Central
- Rural District: Miyan Ab-e Shomali

Population (2006)
  - Total: 68
- Time zone: UTC+3:30 (IRST)
  - Summer (DST): UTC+4:30 (IRDT)

Gavmishabad-e Sheykh Hosun (Persian: گاوميش ابادشيخ حسون, also Romanized as Gāvmīshābād-e Sheykh Ḩosūn) is a village in Miyan Ab-e Shomali Rural District, in the Central District of Shushtar County, Khuzestan Province, Iran. At the 2006 census, its population was 68, in 15 families.
