= Qaleh-ye Gareh =

Qaleh-ye Gareh قلعه گره
- Village
- Location within Iran
- Coordinates: 31°45′32″N 49°13′29″E
- Country: Iran
- Province: Khuzestan
- County: Shushtar
- Bakhsh: Central
- Rural District: Shahid Modarres

Population (2006)
  - Total: 30
- Time zone: UTC+3:30 (IRST)
  - Summer (DST): UTC+4:30 (IRDT)

Qaleh-ye Gareh (Persian: قلعه گره, also Romanized as Qal‘eh-ye Gareh and Qal‘eh Garreh) is a village in Shahid Modarres Rural District, in the Central District of Shushtar County, Khuzestan Province, Iran. At the 2006 census, its population was 30, in 6 families.
