= Ghafel =

Ghafel غافل
- Village
- Location within Iran
- Coordinates: 31°43′06″N 49°01′34″E
- Country: Iran
- Province: Khuzestan
- County: Shushtar
- Bakhsh: Central
- Rural District: Shahid Modarres

Population (2006)
  - Total: 148
- Time zone: UTC+3:30 (IRST)
  - Summer (DST): UTC+4:30 (IRDT)

Ghafel (Persian: غافل, also Romanized as Ghāfel) is a village in Shahid Modarres Rural District, in the Central District of Shushtar County, Khuzestan Province, Iran. At the 2006 census, its population was 148, in 22 families.
