= Deylam (disambiguation) =

Deylam is a city in Bushehr Province, Iran.

Deylam (Persian: ديلم) may also refer to:

- Deylam, Khuzestan
- Deylam, former name of Gilan Province
- Deylam-e Jadid, Khuzestan Province
- Deylam-e Olya, Khuzestan Province
- Deylam-e Sofla, Khuzestan Province
