= Gavmishabad, Shushtar =

Village in Khuzestan province, Iran

Gavmishabad Persian: گاوميش اباد
- Village
- Location within Iran
- Coordinates: 32°00′51″N 48°50′46″E
- Country: Iran
- Province: Khuzestan
- County: Shushtar
- District: Miyan Ab
- Rural District: Miyan Ab-e Shomali

Population (2016)
  - Total: 5,722
- Time zone: UTC+3:30 (IRST)

Gavmishabad (Persian: گاوميش اباد) (Note: Also romanized as Gāvmīshābād) is a village in Miyan Ab-e Shomali Rural District of Miyan Ab District, Shushtar County, Khuzestan province, Iran.

== Demographics ==
=== Population ===
At the time of the 2006 National Census, the village's population was 5,688 in 1,063 households, when it was in the Central District. The village did not appear in the census of 2011. The 2016 census measured the population of the village as 5,722 people in 1,470 households, by which time the rural district had been separated from the district in the establishment of Miyan Ab District. It was the most populous village in its rural district.
