= Tak Taku =

Tak Taku تكتكو
- Village
- Location within Iran
- Coordinates: 32°02′00″N 48°54′00″E
- Country: Iran
- Province: Khuzestan
- County: Shushtar
- Bakhsh: Central
- Rural District: Shahid Modarres

Population (2006)
  - Total: 677
- Time zone: UTC+3:30 (IRST)
  - Summer (DST): UTC+4:30 (IRDT)

Tak Taku (Persian: تكتكو, also Romanized as Tak Takū) is a village in Shahid Modarres Rural District, in the Central District of Shushtar County, Khuzestan Province, Iran. At the 2006 census, its population was 677, in 123 families.
