= Zohuabad =

Zohuabad زهواباد
- Village
- Location within Iran
- Coordinates: 31°47′42″N 48°54′35″E
- Country: Iran
- Province: Khuzestan
- County: Shushtar
- Bakhsh: Central
- Rural District: Miyan Ab

Population (2006)
  - Total: 228
- Time zone: UTC+3:30 (IRST)
  - Summer (DST): UTC+4:30 (IRDT)

Zohuabad (Persian: زهواباد, also Romanized as Zohūābād) is a village in Miyan Ab Rural District, in the Central District of Shushtar County, Khuzestan Province, Iran. At the 2006 census, its population was 228, in 41 families.
