= Shebat-e Tuleh =

Shebat-e Tuleh شعبت طوله
- Village
- Location within Iran
- Coordinates: 31°41′09″N 49°08′42″E
- Country: Iran
- Province: Khuzestan
- County: Shushtar
- Bakhsh: Central
- Rural District: Shahid Modarres

Population (2006)
  - Total: 83
- Time zone: UTC+3:30 (IRST)
  - Summer (DST): UTC+4:30 (IRDT)

Shebat-e Tuleh (Persian: شعبت طوله, also romanized as She‘bat-e Ţūleh, She‘bat-e Tūleh, and Shabet Tūleh) is a village in Shahid Modarres Rural District, in the Central District of Shushtar County, Khuzestan Province, Iran. At the 2006 census, its population was 83, in 14 families.
