= Qaleh-ye Hajj Mohammad Hoseyn =

Qaleh-ye Hajj Mohammad Hoseyn قلعه حاج محمد حسين
- Village
- Country: Iran
- Province: Khuzestan
- County: Shushtar
- Bakhsh: Central
- Rural District: Miyan Ab-e Shomali

Population (2006)
  - Total: 24
- Time zone: UTC+3:30 (IRST)
  - Summer (DST): UTC+4:30 (IRDT)

Qaleh-ye Hajj Mohammad Hoseyn (Persian: قلعه حاج محمد حسين, also Romanized as Qal‘eh-ye Ḩājj Moḩammad Ḩoseyn) is a village in Miyan Ab-e Shomali Rural District, in the Central District of Shushtar County, Khuzestan Province, Iran. At the 2006 census, its population was 24, in 5 families.
