= Shahrak-e Shahid Falahi =

Shahrak-e Shahid Falahi شهرك شهيدفلاحي
- Village
- Country: Iran
- Province: Khuzestan
- County: Shushtar
- Bakhsh: Central
- Rural District: Sardarabad

Population (2006)
  - Total: 594
- Time zone: UTC+3:30 (IRST)
  - Summer (DST): UTC+4:30 (IRDT)

Shahrak-e Shahid Falahi (Persian: شهرك شهيدفلاحي, also Romanized as Shahrak-e Shahīd Falāḥī) is a village in Sardarabad Rural District, in the Central District of Shushtar County, Khuzestan Province, Iran. At the 2006 census, its population was 594, in 90 families.
