= Choveys =

Choveys (Persian: چويس), also rendered as Joveyz, Joveys, and Joveyzeh, may refer to:

- Choveys 1
- Choveys 2
- Choveys 3
