= Beh Bid =

Beh Bid به بيد
- Village
- Location within Iran
- Coordinates: 31°55′03″N 48°58′05″E
- Country: Iran
- Province: Khuzestan
- County: Shushtar
- Bakhsh: Central
- Rural District: Shahid Modarres

Population (2006)
  - Total: 453
- Time zone: UTC+3:30 (IRST)
  - Summer (DST): UTC+4:30 (IRDT)

Beh Bid (Persian: به بيد, also Romanized as Beh Bīd) is a village in Shahid Modarres Rural District, in the Central District of Shushtar County, Khuzestan Province, Iran. At the 2006 census, its population was 453, in 86 families.
