= Abu Tayur =

Abu Tayur or Abu Teyur (Persian: ابوطيور) may refer to:

- Abu Tayur 1
- Abu Tayur 2
- Abu Tayur 3
