= Qaleh-ye Abd ol Hoseyn =

Qaleh-ye Abd ol Hoseyn قلعه عبدالحسين
- Village
- Location within Iran
- Coordinates: 31°58′50″N 48°51′36″E
- Country: Iran
- Province: Khuzestan
- County: Shushtar
- Bakhsh: Central
- Rural District: Miyan Ab-e Shomali

Population (2006)
  - Total: 731
- Time zone: UTC+3:30 (IRST)
  - Summer (DST): UTC+4:30 (IRDT)

Qaleh-ye Abd ol Hoseyn (Persian: قلعه عبدالحسين, also Romanized as Qal‘eh-ye ‘Abd ol Ḩoseyn; also known as Ḩājj Mon‘em and Qal‘eh-e Ḩājj ‘Abd ol Ḩoseyn) is a village in Miyan Ab-e Shomali Rural District, in the Central District of Shushtar County, Khuzestan Province, Iran. At the 2006 census, its population was 731, in 137 families.
