= Abdoli =

Abdoli عبدلي
- Village
- Location within Iran
- Coordinates: 31°46′45″N 48°49′20″E
- Country: Iran
- Province: Khuzestan
- County: Shushtar
- Bakhsh: Shadravan
- Rural District: Shoaybiyeh-ye Sharqi

Population (2006)
  - Total: 410
- Time zone: UTC+3:30 (IRST)
  - Summer (DST): UTC+4:30 (IRDT)

Abdoli (Persian: عبدلي, also Romanized as ‘Abdolī and ‘Abdelī) is a village in Shoaybiyeh-ye Sharqi Rural District, Shadravan District, Shushtar County, Khuzestan Province, Iran. At the 2006 census, its population was 410, in 69 families.
