= Seyyed Dakhil =

Seyyed Dakhil سيددخيل
- Village
- Location within Iran
- Coordinates: 31°46′39″N 49°01′06″E
- Country: Iran
- Province: Khuzestan
- County: Shushtar
- Bakhsh: Central
- Rural District: Shahid Modarres

Population (2006)
  - Total: 17
- Time zone: UTC+3:30 (IRST)
  - Summer (DST): UTC+4:30 (IRDT)

Seyyed Dakhil (Persian: سيددخيل, also Romanized as Seyyed Dakhīl; also known as Saiyid Dukhil and Seyyed Dakhīl-e Yek) is a village in Shahid Modarres Rural District, in the Central District of Shushtar County, Khuzestan Province, Iran. At the 2006 census, its population was 17, in 4 families.
