= Shajarat =

Shajarat شجرات
- Village
- Location within Iran
- Coordinates: 31°34′27″N 49°10′25″E
- Country: Iran
- Province: Khuzestan
- County: Shushtar
- Bakhsh: Central
- Rural District: Shahid Modarres

Population (2006)
  - Total: 48
- Time zone: UTC+3:30 (IRST)
  - Summer (DST): UTC+4:30 (IRDT)

Shajarat (Persian: شجرات, also Romanized as Shajarāt; also known as Shajīrāt) is a village in Shahid Modarres Rural District, in the Central District of Shushtar County, Khuzestan Province, Iran. At the 2006 census, its population was 48, in 10 families.
