= Mahamid, Iran =

Mahamid محاميد
- Village
- Location within Iran
- Coordinates: 31°49′26″N 49°01′01″E
- Country: Iran
- Province: Khuzestan
- County: Shushtar
- Bakhsh: Central
- Rural District: Shahid Modarres

Population (2006)
  - Total: 214
- Time zone: UTC+3:30 (IRST)
  - Summer (DST): UTC+4:30 (IRDT)

Mahamid (Persian: محاميد, also Romanized as Maḩāmīd; also known as Maḩāmed) is a village in Shahid Modarres Rural District, in the Central District of Shushtar County, Khuzestan Province, Iran. At the 1950 census, its population was 214, in 45 families.
