= Qaleh-ye Sheykh Jasem =

Qaleh-ye Sheykh Jasem قلعه شيخ جاسم
- Village
- Location within Iran
- Coordinates: 31°44′21″N 48°41′32″E
- Country: Iran
- Province: Khuzestan
- County: Shushtar
- Bakhsh: Shadravan
- Rural District: Shoaybiyeh-ye Gharbi

Population (2006)
  - Total: 428
- Time zone: UTC+3:30 (IRST)
  - Summer (DST): UTC+4:30 (IRDT)

Qaleh-ye Sheykh Jasem (Persian: قلعه شيخ جاسم, also Romanized as Qal‘eh-ye Sheykh Jāsem) is a village in Shoaybiyeh-ye Gharbi Rural District, Shadravan District, Shushtar County, Khuzestan Province, Iran. At the 2006 census, its population was 428, in 75 families.
