= Sheykh Rahman =

Sheykh Rahman شيخ رحمان
- Village
- Location within Iran
- Coordinates: 31°47′15″N 48°39′00″E
- Country: Iran
- Province: Khuzestan
- County: Shushtar
- Bakhsh: Shadravan
- Rural District: Shoaybiyeh-ye Gharbi

Population (2006)
  - Total: 100
- Time zone: UTC+3:30 (IRST)
  - Summer (DST): UTC+4:30 (IRDT)

Sheykh Rahman (Persian: شيخ رحمان, also Romanized as Sheykh Raḩmān; also known as Sheykh Raḩmānī) is a village in Shoaybiyeh-ye Gharbi Rural District, Shadravan District, Shushtar County, Khuzestan Province, Iran. At the 2006 census, its population was 100, in 14 families.
