= Shoaybiyeh =

Shoaybiyeh or Shoeybiyeh (Persian: شعيبيه) may refer to:

- Shoaybiyeh District, an administrative division of Shushtar County, Khuzestan province, Iran
- Shoaybiyeh-ye Gharbi Rural District, an administrative division of Shushtar County, Khuzestan province, Iran
- Shoaybiyeh-ye Sharqi Rural District, an administrative division of Shushtar County, Khuzestan province, Iran
