= Pir Gari =

Pir Gari پيرگاري
- Village
- Location within Iran
- Coordinates: 31°59′48″N 48°57′29″E
- Country: Iran
- Province: Khuzestan
- County: Shushtar
- Bakhsh: Central
- Rural District: Shahid Modarres

Population (2006)
  - Total: 359
- Time zone: UTC+3:30 (IRST)
  - Summer (DST): UTC+4:30 (IRDT)

Pir Gari (Persian: پيرگاري, also Romanized as Pīr Gārī; also known as Pīr Goori and Pīr Gūrī) is a village in Shahid Modarres Rural District, in the Central District of Shushtar County, Khuzestan Province, Iran. At the 2006 census, its population was 359, in 79 families.
