= Panj Mil =

Panj Mil پنج ميل
- Village
- Location within Iran
- Coordinates: 31°58′39″N 49°00′07″E
- Country: Iran
- Province: Khuzestan
- County: Shushtar
- Bakhsh: Central
- Rural District: Shahid Modarres

Population (2006)
  - Total: 45
- Time zone: UTC+3:30 (IRST)
  - Summer (DST): UTC+4:30 (IRDT)

Panj Mil (Persian: پنج ميل, also Romanized as Panj Mīl; also known as Panj Mīlī) is a village in Shahid Modarres Rural District, in the Central District of Shushtar County, Khuzestan Province, Iran. At the 2006 census, its population was 45, in 8 families.
