= Mashhadi, Khuzestan =

Mashhadi مشهدي
- Village
- Location within Iran
- Coordinates: 31°46′37″N 48°59′51″E
- Country: Iran
- Province: Khuzestan
- County: Shushtar
- Bakhsh: Central
- Rural District: Shahid Modarres

Population (2006)
  - Total: 61
- Time zone: UTC+3:30 (IRST)
  - Summer (DST): UTC+4:30 (IRDT)

Mashhadi (Persian: مشهدي, also Romanized as Mashhadī; also known as Boneh-ye Khanjar, Khanjar, and Masḩadī) is a village in Shahid Modarres Rural District, in the Central District of Shushtar County, Khuzestan Province, Iran. At the 2006 census, its population was 61, in 13 families.
