= Konar Pir =

Konar Pir كنارپير
- Village
- Location within Iran
- Coordinates: 31°59′18″N 48°50′02″E
- Country: Iran
- Province: Khuzestan
- County: Shushtar
- Bakhsh: Central
- Rural District: Miyan Ab-e Shomali

Population (2006)
  - Total: 1,096
- Time zone: UTC+3:30 (IRST)
  - Summer (DST): UTC+4:30 (IRDT)

Konar Pir (Persian: كنارپير, also Romanized as Konār Pīr, Kenar Pir, and Kunār Pīr) is a village in Miyan Ab-e Shomali Rural District, in the Central District of Shushtar County, Khuzestan Province, Iran. At the 2006 census, its population was 1,096, in 239 families.
