= Abdol Amir =

Abdol Amir عبدالامير
- Village
- Country: Iran
- Province: Khuzestan
- County: Shushtar
- Bakhsh: Shadravan
- Rural District: Shoaybiyeh-ye Sharqi

Population (2006)
  - Total: 165
- Time zone: UTC+3:30 (IRST)
  - Summer (DST): UTC+4:30 (IRDT)

Abdol Amir (Persian: عبدالامير, also Romanized as ʿAbdol Āmīr) is a village in Shoaybiyeh-ye Sharqi Rural District, Shadravan District, Shushtar County, Khuzestan Province, Iran. At the 2006 census, its population was 165, in 32 families.
