= Sufan-e Olya =

Sufan-e Olya سوفان عليا
- Village
- Location within Iran
- Coordinates: 31°52′20″N 48°59′37″E
- Country: Iran
- Province: Khuzestan
- County: Shushtar
- Bakhsh: Central
- Rural District: Miyan Ab-e Shomali

Population (2006)
  - Total: 138
- Time zone: UTC+3:30 (IRST)
  - Summer (DST): UTC+4:30 (IRDT)

Sufan-e Olya (Persian: سوفان عليا, also Romanized as Sūfān-e ‘Olyā, Sofān-e ‘Olyā, and Soofan ‘Olya; also known as Soffān-e Bālā and Şūfān-e Bālā) is a village in Miyan Ab-e Shomali Rural District, in the Central District of Shushtar County, Khuzestan Province, Iran. At the 2006 census, its population was 138, in 27 families.
