= Bokeysheh =

Bokeysheh بكيشه
- Village
- Location within Iran
- Coordinates: 31°47′32″N 48°52′55″E
- Country: Iran
- Province: Khuzestan
- County: Shushtar
- Bakhsh: Central
- Rural District: Miyan Ab

Population (2006)
  - Total: 371
- Time zone: UTC+3:30 (IRST)
  - Summer (DST): UTC+4:30 (IRDT)

Bokeysheh (Persian: بكيشه, also Romanized as Bokeysheh; also known as Bakisheh) is a village in Miyan Ab Rural District, in the Central District of Shushtar County, Khuzestan Province, Iran. At the 2006 census, its population was 371, in 58 families.
