= Darkhazineh =

Village in Khuzestan province, Iran

Darkhazineh Persian: درخزينه
- Village
- Location within Iran
- Coordinates: 31°54′06″N 48°58′50″E
- Country: Iran
- Province: Khuzestan
- County: Shushtar
- District: Central
- Rural District: Shahid Modarres

Population (2016)
  - Total: 291
- Time zone: UTC+3:30 (IRST)

Darkhazineh (Persian: درخزينه) (Note: Also romanized as Dar-i-Khazineh and Darkhazīneh) is a village in, and the capital of, Shahid Modarres Rural District of the Central District of Shushtar County, Khuzestan province, Iran.

== Demographics ==
=== Population ===
At the time of the 2006 National Census, the village's population was 459 in 96 households. The following census in 2011 counted 237 people in 65 households. The 2016 census measured the population of the village as 291 people in 80 households.
