= Chanibeh =

Chanibeh (Persian: چنيبه) may refer to:

- Chanibeh 1
- Chanibeh 2
