= Bardemil, Shushtar =

Bardemil بردميل
- Village
- Location within Iran
- Coordinates: 31°58′22″N 49°03′46″E
- Country: Iran
- Province: Khuzestan
- County: Shushtar
- Bakhsh: Central
- Rural District: Shahid Modarres

Population (2006)
  - Total: 19
- Time zone: UTC+3:30 (IRST)
  - Summer (DST): UTC+4:30 (IRDT)

Bardemil (Persian: بردميل, also Romanized as Bardemīl; also known as Bardeh Mīl) is a village in Shahid Modarres Rural District, in the Central District of Shushtar County, Khuzestan Province, Iran. At the 2006 census, its population was 19, in 4 families.
