= Shahrak-e Askan Ashayir =

Shahrak-e Askan Ashayir or Shahrak-e Askan Ashayr (Persian: شهرك اسكان عشاير) may refer to:

- Shahrak-e Askan Ashayir, Behbahan
- Shahrak-e Askan Ashayr, Shushtar
