= Abu Garva =

Abu Garva or Abu Gerva or Abu Gorva (Persian: ابوگروا), also rendered as Abu Gorveh, may refer to:

- Abu Garva 1
- Abu Garva 2
