= Magarnat-e Yek =

Magarnat-e Yek مگرنات يك
- Village
- Location within Iran
- Coordinates: 31°47′20″N 48°51′46″E
- Country: Iran
- Province: Khuzestan
- County: Shushtar
- Bakhsh: Shadravan
- Rural District: Shoaybiyeh-ye Sharqi

Population (2006)
  - Total: 547
- Time zone: UTC+3:30 (IRST)
  - Summer (DST): UTC+4:30 (IRDT)

Magarnat-e Yek (Persian: مگرنات يك, also Romanized as Magarnāt-e Yek; also known as Magarnād-e Yek, Magarnāt, and Mogernād) is a village in Shoaybiyeh-ye Sharqi Rural District, Shadravan District, Shushtar County, Khuzestan Province, Iran. At the 2006 census, its population was 547, in 101 families.
