= Chanibeh-ye Yek =

Chanibeh-ye Yek بند قیر
- Village
- Location within Iran
- Coordinates: 31°39′41″N 48°49′56″E
- Country: Iran
- Province: Khuzestan
- County: Shushtar
- Bakhsh: Shadravan
- Rural District: Shoaybiyeh-ye Sharqi

Population (2006)
  - Total: 242
- Time zone: UTC+3:30 (IRST)
  - Summer (DST): UTC+4:30 (IRDT)

Chanibeh-ye Yek (Persian: چنيبه يك, also Romanized as Chanībeh-ye Yek) is a village in Shoaybiyeh-ye Sharqi Rural District, Shadravan District, Shushtar County, Khuzestan Province, Iran. At the 2006 census, its population was 242, in 34 families.
