= Abd-ol Seyyed =

Abd-ol Seyyed or Abd ol Seyyed or Abdol Seyyed (Persian: عبدالسيد) may refer to:

- Abd-ol Seyyed, Ahvaz
- Abd-ol Seyyed, Shushtar
