= Haddam-e Yek =

Haddam-e Yek هدام يك
- Village
- Location within Iran
- Coordinates: 31°42′21″N 49°00′36″E
- Country: Iran
- Province: Khuzestan
- County: Shushtar
- Bakhsh: Central
- Rural District: Shahid Modarres

Population (2006)
  - Total: 65
- Time zone: UTC+3:30 (IRST)
  - Summer (DST): UTC+4:30 (IRDT)

Haddam-e Yek (Persian: هدام يك, also Romanized as Ḩaddām-e Yek) is a village in Shahid Modarres Rural District, in the Central District of Shushtar County, Khuzestan Province, Iran. At the 2006 census, its population was 65, in 12 families.
