= Choveys-e Seh =

Choveys-e Seh چويس سه
- Village
- Location within Iran
- Coordinates: 31°39′18″N 48°44′20″E
- Country: Iran
- Province: Khuzestan
- County: Shushtar
- Bakhsh: Shadravan
- Rural District: Shoaybiyeh-ye Gharbi

Population (2006)
  - Total: 107
- Time zone: UTC+3:30 (IRST)
  - Summer (DST): UTC+4:30 (IRDT)

Choveys-e Seh (Persian: چويس سه) is a village in Shoaybiyeh-ye Gharbi Rural District, Shadravan District, Shushtar County, Khuzestan Province, Iran. At the 2006 census, its population was 107, in 19 families.
