= Choveys-e Do =

Choveys-e Do چويس دو
- Village
- Location within Iran
- Coordinates: 31°39′23″N 48°43′42″E
- Country: Iran
- Province: Khuzestan
- County: Shushtar
- Bakhsh: Shadravan
- Rural District: Shoaybiyeh-ye Gharbi

Population (2006)
  - Total: 394
- Time zone: UTC+3:30 (IRST)
  - Summer (DST): UTC+4:30 (IRDT)

Choveys-e Do (Persian: چويس دو; also known as Joveyz-e Do and Joveyzeh Do) is a village in Shoaybiyeh-ye Gharbi Rural District, Shadravan District, Shushtar County, Khuzestan Province, Iran. At the 2006 census, its population was 394, in 67 families.
