= Arab Hasan =

Village in Khuzestan province, Iran

Arab Hasan Persian: عرب حسن
- Village
- Location within Iran
- Coordinates: 31°49′59″N 48°53′47″E
- Country: Iran
- Province: Khuzestan
- County: Shushtar
- District: Miyan Ab
- Rural District: Miyan Ab-e Jonubi

Population (2016)
  - Total: 2,268
- Time zone: UTC+3:30 (IRST)

Arab Hasan (Persian: عرب حسن) (Note: Also romanized as ‘Arab Ḩasan) is a village in Miyan Ab-e Jonubi Rural District (Note: Formerly Miyan Ab Rural District) of Miyan Ab District, Shushtar County, Khuzestan province, Iran, serving as capital of both the district and the rural district.

== Demographics ==
=== Population ===
At the time of the 2006 National Census, the village's population was 2,107 in 356 households, when it was in Miyan Ab Rural District (Note: Renamed Miyan Ab-e Jonubi Rural District) of the Central District. The following census in 2011 counted 2,147 people in 468 households. The 2016 census measured the population of the village as 2,268 people in 601 households, by which time the rural district had been separated from the district in the formation of Miyan Ab District and renamed Miyan Ab-e Jonubi Rural District. It was the most populous village in its rural district.
