= Alleh-ye Band-e Qir =

Alleh-ye Band-e Qir عله بندقير
- Village
- Country: Iran
- Province: Khuzestan
- County: Shushtar
- Bakhsh: Central
- Rural District: Miyan Ab

Population (2006)
  - Total: 148
- Time zone: UTC+3:30 (IRST)
  - Summer (DST): UTC+4:30 (IRDT)

Alleh-ye Band-e Qir (Persian: عله بندقير, also Romanized as ʿAlleh-ye Band-e Qīr) is a village in Miyan Ab Rural District, in the Central District of Shushtar County, Khuzestan Province, Iran. At the 2006 census, its population was 148, in 23 families.
