= Abu Geraniyeh =

Abu Geraniyeh (Persian: ابوگرينيه), also rendered as Abu Gereyneh and Abu Gereyniyeh, may refer to:

- Abu Geraniyeh 1
- Abu Geraniyeh 2
