= Yabareh, Shoushtar =

Yabareh يباره
- Village
- Location within Iran
- Coordinates: 31°53′58″N 48°58′37″E
- Country: Iran
- Province: Khuzestan
- County: Shoushtar
- Bakhsh: Central
- Rural District: Miyan Ab-e Shomali

Population (2006)
  - Total: 288
- Time zone: UTC+3:30 (IRST)
  - Summer (DST): UTC+4:30 (IRDT)

Yabareh (Persian: يباره, also Romanized as Yabāreh, Yebareh, and Yobāreh; also known as Boneh-ye Yabāreh and Boneh-ye Yūbārā) is a village in Miyan Ab-e Shomali Rural District, in the Central District of Shoushtar County, Khuzestan Province, Iran. At the 2006 census, its population was 288, in 43 families.
