= Shoqarij-e Sofla =

Shoqarij-e Sofla شقاريج سفلي
- Village
- Location within Iran
- Coordinates: 31°46′04″N 48°59′35″E
- Country: Iran
- Province: Khuzestan
- County: Shushtar
- Bakhsh: Central
- Rural District: Miyan Ab

Population (2006)
  - Total: 169
- Time zone: UTC+3:30 (IRST)
  - Summer (DST): UTC+4:30 (IRDT)

Shoqarij-e Sofla (Persian: شقاريج سفلي, also Romanized as Shoqārīj-e Soflá; also known as Marzūk, Shagharich Sofla, Shaghārīj-e Pā’īn, Shoghārīj-e Pā’īn, Shoghārīj-e Soflā, and Shoghārīj-e Soflá) is a village in Miyan Ab Rural District in the Central District of Shushtar County, Khuzestan Province, Iran. At the 2006 census, its population was 169, in 28 families.
