= Zoviyeh-ye Yek =

Zoviyeh-ye Yek (Persian: زويه يك) may refer to:

- Zoviyeh-ye Yek-e Olya
- Zoviyeh-ye Yek-e Sofla
