= Nur Ali, Iran =

Nur Ali نورعلي
- Village
- Location within Iran
- Coordinates: 31°57′17″N 48°55′42″E
- Country: Iran
- Province: Khuzestan
- County: Shushtar
- Bakhsh: Central
- Rural District: Shahid Modarres

Population (2006)
  - Total: 95
- Time zone: UTC+3:30 (IRST)
  - Summer (DST): UTC+4:30 (IRDT)

Nur Ali (Persian: نورعلي, also Romanized as Nūr ‘Alī and Noor Ali) is a village in Shahid Modarres Rural District, in the Central District of Shushtar County, Khuzestan Province, Iran. At the 2006 census, its population was 95, in 21 families.
