= Shoqarij-e Olya =

Shoqarij-e Olya شقاريج عليا
- Village
- Location within Iran
- Coordinates: 31°47′00″N 49°00′09″E
- Country: Iran
- Province: Khuzestan
- County: Shushtar
- Bakhsh: Central
- Rural District: Miyan Ab

Population (2006)
  - Total: 84
- Time zone: UTC+3:30 (IRST)
  - Summer (DST): UTC+4:30 (IRDT)

Shoqarij-e Olya (Persian: شقاريج عليا, also Romanized as Shoqārīj-e ‘Olyā; also known as Shoghārīj-e ‘Olyā, Sheghārīj-e ‘Olyā, Saghārīj-e Bālā, Shagharich ‘Olya, Shaghārīj-e Bālā, and Shoghārīj-e Bālā) is a village in Miyan Ab Rural District, in the Central District of Shushtar County, Khuzestan Province, Iran. At the 2006 census, its population was 84, in 16 families.
