= Farsiyeh, Shushtar =

Farsiyeh فارسيه
- Village
- Location within Iran
- Coordinates: 31°45′42″N 48°41′41″E
- Country: Iran
- Province: Khuzestan
- County: Shushtar
- Bakhsh: Shadravan
- Rural District: Shoaybiyeh-ye Gharbi

Population (2006)
  - Total: 416
- Time zone: UTC+3:30 (IRST)
  - Summer (DST): UTC+4:30 (IRDT)

Farsiyeh (Persian: فارسيه, also Romanized as Fārsīyeh; also known as Fārsīyeh-ye Yek) is a village in Shoaybiyeh-ye Gharbi Rural District, Shadravan District, Shushtar County, Khuzestan Province, Iran. At the 2006 census, its population was 416, in 64 families.
