= Magarnat =

Magarnat (Persian: مگرنات), also rendered as Magarnad and Mogernad, may refer to:

- Magarnat 1
- Magarnat 2
- Magarnat 3
