= Chahar Gaveh =

Chahar Gaveh چهارگاوه
- Village
- Location within Iran
- Coordinates: 31°55′43″N 48°57′25″E
- Country: Iran
- Province: Khuzestan
- County: Shushtar
- Bakhsh: Central
- Rural District: Miyan Ab-e Shomali

Population (2006)
  - Total: 310
- Time zone: UTC+3:30 (IRST)
  - Summer (DST): UTC+4:30 (IRDT)

Chahar Gaveh (Persian: چهارگاوه, also Romanized as Chahār Gāveh; also known as Chahār Gāv and Chahār Kāveh) is a village in Miyan Ab-e Shomali Rural District, in the Central District of Shushtar County, Khuzestan Province, Iran. At the 2006 census, its population was 310, in 61 families.
