= Shalili =

Shalili (Persian: شليلي), also rendered as Shahaili, may refer to:

- Shalili-ye Bozorg
- Shalili-ye Kuchek
