= Pirdalu =

Village in Khuzestan province, Iran

Pirdalu Persian: پيردالو
- Village
- Location within Iran
- Coordinates: 32°03′24″N 48°52′31″E
- Country: Iran
- Province: Khuzestan
- County: Shushtar
- District: Central
- Rural District: Shahid Modarres

Population (2016)
  - Total: 2,300
- Time zone: UTC+3:30 (IRST)

Pirdalu (Persian: پيردالو) (Note: Also romanized as Pīrdālū) is a village in Shahid Modarres Rural District of the Central District of Shushtar County, Khuzestan province, Iran.

== Demographics ==
=== Population ===
At the time of the 2006 National Census, the village's population was 1,915 in 338 households. The following census in 2011 counted 1,873 people in 438 households. The 2016 census measured the population of the village as 2,300 people in 593 households. It was the most populous village in its rural district.
