= Shahrak-e Shahid Beheshti, Shoushtar =

Shahrak-e Shahid Beheshti شهرك شهيدبهشتي
- Village
- Country: Iran
- Province: Khuzestan
- County: Shushtar
- Bakhsh: Central
- Rural District: Sardarabad

Population (2006)
  - Total: 1,809
- Time zone: UTC+3:30 (IRST)
  - Summer (DST): UTC+4:30 (IRDT)

Shahrak-e Shahid Beheshti (Persian: شهرك شهيدبهشتي, also Romanized as Shahrak-e Shahīd Beheshtī) is a village in Sardarabad Rural District, in the Central District of Shushtar County, Khuzestan Province, Iran. At the 2006 census, its population was 1,809, in 399 families.
