= Zoviyeh-ye Pain =

Zoviyeh-ye Pain (Persian: زويه پايين) may refer to:

- Zoviyeh-ye Do
- Zoviyeh-ye Yek-e Sofla
