= Helaleh =

Helaleh or Halaleh (Persian: هلاله) may refer to:

- Halaleh-ye Manzel
- Konar Helaleh
