= Alleh-ye Hajj Abdol Ali =

Alleh-ye Hajj Abdol Ali عله حاج عبدالعلي
- Village
- Country: Iran
- Province: Khuzestan
- County: Shushtar
- Bakhsh: Central
- Rural District: Miyan Ab

Population (2006)
  - Total: 320
- Time zone: UTC+3:30 (IRST)
  - Summer (DST): UTC+4:30 (IRDT)

Alleh-ye Hajj Abdol Ali (Persian: عله حاج عبدالعلي, also Romanized as ʿAlleh-ye Ḩājj ʿAbdol ʿAlī) is a village in Miyan Ab Rural District, in the Central District of Shushtar County, Khuzestan Province, Iran. At the 2006 census, its population was 320, in 53 families.
