= Abd-ol Seyyed, Shushtar =

Abd-ol Seyyed عبدالسيد
- Village
- Location within Iran
- Coordinates: 31°40′57″N 48°42′36″E
- Country: Iran
- Province: Khuzestan
- County: Shushtar
- Bakhsh: Shadravan
- Rural District: Shoaybiyeh-ye Gharbi

Population (2006)
  - Total: 643
- Time zone: UTC+3:30 (IRST)
  - Summer (DST): UTC+4:30 (IRDT)

Abd-ol Seyyed (Persian: عبدالسيد, also Romanized as ‘Abd-ol Seyyed; also known as ‘Abd-e Sa‘īd, ‘Abd ol Sa‘īd-e Marīvash) is a village in Shoaybiyeh-ye Gharbi Rural District, Shadravan District, Shushtar County, Khuzestan Province, Iran. At the 2006 census, its population was 643, with 107 families.
