= Magarnat-e Seh =

Magarnat-e Seh مگرنات سه
- Village
- Location within Iran
- Coordinates: 31°48′08″N 48°51′35″E
- Country: Iran
- Province: Khuzestan
- County: Shushtar
- Bakhsh: Shadravan
- Rural District: Shoaybiyeh-ye Sharqi

Population (2006)
  - Total: 160
- Time zone: UTC+3:30 (IRST)
  - Summer (DST): UTC+4:30 (IRDT)

Magarnat-e Seh (Persian: مگرنات سه, also Romanized as Magarnāt-e Seh) is a village in Shoaybiyeh-ye Sharqi Rural District, Shadravan District, Shushtar County, Khuzestan Province, Iran. At the 2006 census, its population was 160, in 22 families.
