= Abu Tayur-e Do =

Abu Tayur-e Do ابوطيوردو
- Village
- Location within Iran
- Coordinates: 31°37′43″N 48°47′39″E
- Country: Iran
- Province: Khuzestan
- County: Shushtar
- Bakhsh: Shadravan
- Rural District: Shoaybiyeh-ye Sharqi

Population (2006)
  - Total: 147
- Time zone: UTC+3:30 (IRST)
  - Summer (DST): UTC+4:30 (IRDT)

Abu Tayur-e Do (Persian: ابوطيوردو, also Romanized as Abū Ţayūr-e Do and Abū Ţeyūr-e Do) is a village in Shoaybiyeh-ye Sharqi Rural District, Shadravan District, Shushtar County, Khuzestan Province, Iran. At the 2006 census, its population was 147, in 24 families.
