= Zabari-ye Yek =

Zabari-ye Yek زباري يك
- Village
- Location within Iran
- Coordinates: 31°43′58″N 48°50′45″E
- Country: Iran
- Province: Khuzestan
- County: Shushtar
- Bakhsh: Central
- Rural District: Miyan Ab

Population (2006)
  - Total: 174
- Time zone: UTC+3:30 (IRST)
  - Summer (DST): UTC+4:30 (IRDT)

Zabari-ye Yek (Persian: زباري يك, also Romanized as Zabārī-ye Yek; also known as Shaikh Zibāri, Sheykh Zabārī, Sheykh Zebārī, Sheykh Zīārī, Zabārī, and Zobārī) is a village in Miyan Ab Rural District, in the Central District of Shushtar County, Khuzestan Province, Iran. At the 2006 census, its population was 174, in 30 families.
