= Shoqarij =

Shoqarij (Persian: شقاريج), also rendered as Shagharich, Shagharij, Shegharij, Shogharij, and Sagharij, may refer to:

- Shoqarij-e Olya
- Shoqarij-e Sofla
