= Abu Tayur-e Seh =

Abu Tayur-e Seh ابوطيورسه
- Village
- Location within Iran
- Coordinates: 31°38′07″N 48°48′49″E
- Country: Iran
- Province: Khuzestan
- County: Shushtar
- Bakhsh: Shadravan
- Rural District: Shoaybiyeh-ye Sharqi

Population (2006)
  - Total: 215
- Time zone: UTC+3:30 (IRST)
  - Summer (DST): UTC+4:30 (IRDT)

Abu Tayur-e Seh (Persian: ابوطيورسه, also Romanized as Abū Ţayūr-e Seh) is a village in Shoaybiyeh-ye Sharqi Rural District, Shadravan District, Shushtar County, Khuzestan Province, Iran. At the 2006 census, its population was 215, in 40 families.
