= Alleh =

Alleh (Persian: عله) may refer to:

- Alleh-ye Band-e Qir
- Alleh-ye Hajj Abdol Ali

Musical Artist

- Alleh (Venezuelan musician)
