= Naqishiat =

Naqishiat (Persian: نقيشيات), also rendered as Naghishiat and Nagh-i-Shiyat, may refer to:

- Naqishiat 1
- Naqishiat 2
