= Deylam, Khuzestan =

Deylam ديلم
- Village
- Location within Iran
- Coordinates: 31°46′37″N 48°52′01″E
- Country: Iran
- Province: Khuzestan
- County: Shushtar
- Bakhsh: Central
- Rural District: Miyan Ab

Population (2006)
  - Total: 1,058
- Time zone: UTC+3:30 (IRST)
  - Summer (DST): UTC+4:30 (IRDT)

Deylam (Persian: ديلم; also known as Deylam-e Qadīm) is a village in Miyan Ab Rural District, in the Central District of Shushtar County, Khuzestan Province, Iran. At the 2006 census, its population was 1,058, in 189 families.
