= Farsiyeh-ye Do =

Farsiyeh-ye Do فارسيه دو
- Village
- Location within Iran
- Coordinates: 31°45′01″N 48°41′44″E
- Country: Iran
- Province: Khuzestan
- County: Shushtar
- Bakhsh: Shadravan
- Rural District: Shoaybiyeh-ye Gharbi

Population (2006)
  - Total: 159
- Time zone: UTC+3:30 (IRST)
  - Summer (DST): UTC+4:30 (IRDT)

Farsiyeh-ye Do (Persian: فارسيه دو, also Romanized as Fārsīyeh-ye Do) is a village in Shoaybiyeh-ye Gharbi Rural District, Shadravan District, Shushtar County, Khuzestan Province, Iran. At the 2006 census, its population was 159, in 25 families.
