= Habibabad, Shushtar =

Habibabad حبيب اباد
- Village
- Location within Iran
- Coordinates: 31°46′05″N 49°04′08″E
- Country: Iran
- Province: Khuzestan
- County: Shushtar
- Bakhsh: Central
- Rural District: Shahid Modarres

Population (2006)
  - Total: 64
- Time zone: UTC+3:30 (IRST)
  - Summer (DST): UTC+4:30 (IRDT)

Habibabad (Persian: حبيب اباد, also Romanized as Ḩabībābād; also known as Dasīm and Desīm) is a village in Shahid Modarres Rural District, in the Central District of Shushtar County, Khuzestan Province, Iran. At the 2006 census, its population was 64, in 8 families.
