= Abu Geraniyeh-ye Yek =

Abu Geraniyeh-ye Yek ابوگرينيه يك
- Village
- Location within Iran
- Coordinates: 31°43′23″N 48°49′27″E
- Country: Iran
- Province: Khuzestan
- County: Shushtar
- Bakhsh: Shadravan
- Rural District: Shoaybiyeh-ye Sharqi

Population (2006)
  - Total: 135
- Time zone: UTC+3:30 (IRST)
  - Summer (DST): UTC+4:30 (IRDT)

Abu Geraniyeh-ye Yek (Persian: ابوگرينيه يك, also Romanized as Abū Gerānīyeh-ye Yek; also known as Abū Gereyneh-ye Yek) is a village in Shoaybiyeh-ye Sharqi Rural District, Shadravan District, Shushtar County, Khuzestan Province, Iran. At the 2006 census, its population was 135, in 16 families.
