= Choveys-e Yek =

Choveys-e Yek چويس يك
- Village
- Location within Iran
- Coordinates: 31°38′51″N 48°44′49″E
- Country: Iran
- Province: Khuzestan
- County: Shushtar
- Bakhsh: Shadravan
- Rural District: Shoaybiyeh-ye Gharbi

Population (2006)
  - Total: 257
- Time zone: UTC+3:30 (IRST)
  - Summer (DST): UTC+4:30 (IRDT)

Choveys-e Yek (Persian: چويس يك, also Romanized as Joveys-e Yek and Joveyzeh Yek) is a village in Shoaybiyeh-ye Gharbi Rural District, Shadravan District, Shushtar County, Khuzestan Province, Iran. At the 2006 census, its population was 257, in 41 families.
