= Shalili-ye Kuchek =

Shalili-ye Kuchek شليلي كوچك
- Village
- Location within Iran
- Coordinates: 31°57′46″N 48°53′40″E
- Country: Iran
- Province: Khuzestan
- County: Shushtar
- Bakhsh: Central
- Rural District: Miyan Ab-e Shomali

Population (2006)
  - Total: 175
- Time zone: UTC+3:30 (IRST)
  - Summer (DST): UTC+4:30 (IRDT)

Shalili-ye Kuchek (Persian: شليلي كوچك, also Romanized as Shalīlī-ye Kūchek and Shalīlī-ye Kūchak; also known as Shalīlī-ye Pā’īn) is a village in Miyan Ab-e Shomali Rural District, in the Central District of Shushtar County, Khuzestan Province, Iran. At the 2006 census, its population was 175, in 35 families.
