= Korai-ye Olya =

Korai-ye Olya كرايي عليا
- Village
- Location within Iran
- Coordinates: 31°48′18″N 49°11′55″E
- Country: Iran
- Province: Khuzestan
- County: Shushtar
- Bakhsh: Central
- Rural District: Shahid Modarres

Population (2006)
  - Total: 67
- Time zone: UTC+3:30 (IRST)
  - Summer (DST): UTC+4:30 (IRDT)

Korai-ye Olya (Persian: كرايي عليا, also Romanized as Korā’ī-ye ‘Olyā and Kara’i Olya; also known as Korāhī ‘Olyā, Korāhī-ye ‘Olyā, and Korā’ī-ye Bālā) is a village in Shahid Modarres Rural District, in the Central District of Shushtar County, Khuzestan Province, Iran. At the 2006 census, its population was 67, in 18 families.
