= Korai-ye Sofla =

Korai-ye Sofla كرايي سفلي
- Village
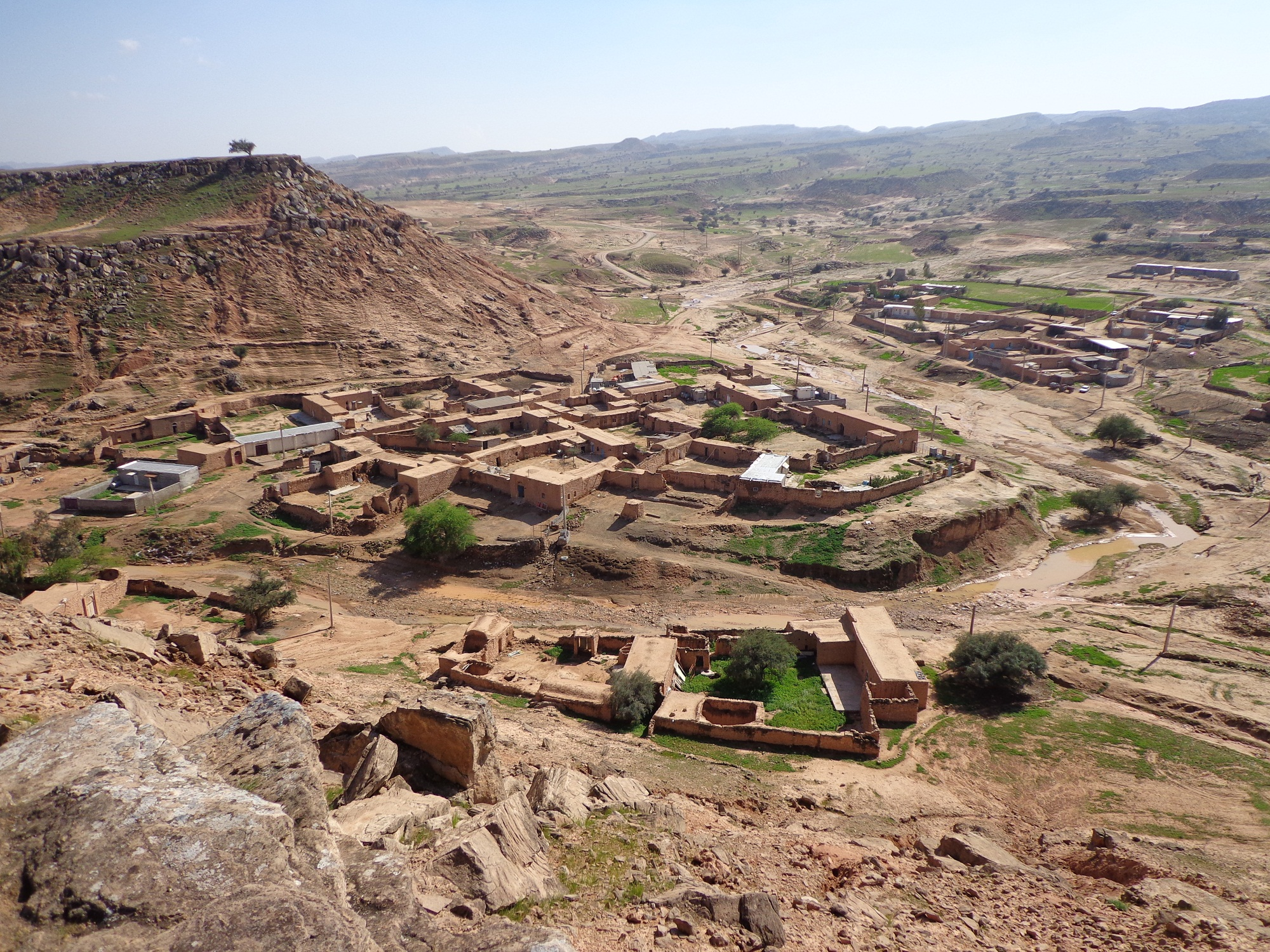
- Korai-ye Sofla

- Location within Iran
- Coordinates: 31°50′50″N 49°10′24″E
- Country: Iran
- Province: Khuzestan
- County: Shushtar
- Bakhsh: Central
- Rural District: Shahid Modarres

Population (2006)
  - Total: 36
- Time zone: UTC+3:30 (IRST)
  - Summer (DST): UTC+4:30 (IRDT)

Korai-ye Sofla (Persian: كرايي سفلي, also Romanized as Korā’ī-ye Soflā and Kara’i Sofla; also known as Korāhi Soflā, Korāhī-ye Soflā, and Korā’ī-ye Pā’īn) is a village in Shahid Modarres Rural District, in the Central District of Shushtar County, Khuzestan Province, Iran. At the 2006 census, its population was 36, in 10 families.
