= Deylam-e Jadid =

Deylam-e Jadid ديلم جديد
- Village
- Location within Iran
- Coordinates: 31°46′47″N 48°53′15″E
- Country: Iran
- Province: Khuzestan
- County: Shushtar
- Bakhsh: Central
- Rural District: Miyan Ab

Population (2006)
  - Total: 578
- Time zone: UTC+3:30 (IRST)
  - Summer (DST): UTC+4:30 (IRDT)

Deylam-e Jadid (Persian: ديلم جديد, also Romanized as Deylam-e Jadīd) is a village in Miyan Ab Rural District, in the Central District of Shushtar County, Khuzestan Province, Iran. At the 2006 census, its population was 578, in 81 families.
