= Halaleh-ye Manzel =

Halaleh-ye Manzel هلاله منزل
- Village
- Location within Iran
- Coordinates: 31°50′16″N 49°00′00″E
- Country: Iran
- Province: Khuzestan
- County: Shushtar
- Bakhsh: Central
- Rural District: Shahid Modarres

Population (2006)
  - Total: 86
- Time zone: UTC+3:30 (IRST)
  - Summer (DST): UTC+4:30 (IRDT)

Halaleh-ye Manzel (Persian: هلاله منزل, also Romanized as Halāleh-ye Manzel and Helāleh-ye Manzel) is a village in Shahid Modarres Rural District, in the Central District of Shushtar County, Khuzestan Province, Iran. At the 2006 census, its population was 86, in 11 families.
