= Yahmureh-ye Yek =

Yahmureh-ye Yek يحموره يك
- Village
- Location within Iran
- Coordinates: 31°40′05″N 48°42′18″E
- Country: Iran
- Province: Khuzestan
- County: Shushtar
- Bakhsh: Shadravan
- Rural District: Shoaybiyeh-ye Gharbi

Population (2006)
  - Total: 369
- Time zone: UTC+3:30 (IRST)
  - Summer (DST): UTC+4:30 (IRDT)

Yahmureh-ye Yek (Persian: يحموره يك, also Romanized as Yaḩmūreh-ye Yek; also known as Yaḩmūreh and Yoḩmūreh) is a village in Shoaybiyeh-ye Gharbi Rural District, Shadravan District, Shushtar County, Khuzestan Province, Iran. At the 2006 census, its population was 369, in 67 families.
