= Abu Garva-e Yek =

Abu Garva-e Yek ابوگروايك
- Village
- Location within Iran
- Coordinates: 31°38′03″N 48°45′33″E
- Country: Iran
- Province: Khuzestan
- County: Shushtar
- Bakhsh: Shadravan
- Rural District: Shoaybiyeh-ye Sharqi

Population (2006)
  - Total: 530
- Time zone: UTC+3:30 (IRST)
  - Summer (DST): UTC+4:30 (IRDT)

Abu Garva-e Yek (Persian: ابوگروايك, also Romanized as Abū Garvā-e Yek; also known as Abū Garvā, Abū Gervā, Abū Gorvā, and Abū Gorveh) is a village in Shoaybiyeh-ye Sharqi Rural District, Shadravan District, Shushtar County, Khuzestan Province, Iran. At the 2006 census, its population was 530, in 96 families.
