= Abu Geraniyeh-ye Do =

Abu Geraniyeh-ye Do ابوگرينيه دو
- Village
- Location within Iran
- Coordinates: 31°42′50″N 48°49′54″E
- Country: Iran
- Province: Khuzestan
- County: Shushtar
- Bakhsh: Shadravan
- Rural District: Shoaybiyeh-ye Sharqi

Population (2006)
  - Total: 76
- Time zone: UTC+3:30 (IRST)
  - Summer (DST): UTC+4:30 (IRDT)

Abu Geraniyeh-ye Do (Persian: ابوگرينيه دو, also Romanized as Abū Gerānīyeh-ye Do; also known as Abū Gereyneh, Abū Gereyneh-ye Do, and Abū Gereynīyeh-ye Do) is a village in Shoaybiyeh-ye Sharqi Rural District, Shadravan District, Shushtar County, Khuzestan Province, Iran. At the 2006 census, its population was 76, in 13 families.
