= Langar-e Jadid =

Langar-e Jadid لنگرجديد
- Village
- Location within Iran
- Coordinates: 31°56′18″N 48°51′34″E
- Country: Iran
- Province: Khuzestan
- County: Shushtar
- Bakhsh: Central
- Rural District: Miyan Ab-e Shomali

Population (2006)
  - Total: 818
- Time zone: UTC+3:30 (IRST)
  - Summer (DST): UTC+4:30 (IRDT)

Langar-e Jadid (Persian: لنگرجديد, also Romanized as Langar-e Jadīd; also known as Langar and Longor) is a village in Miyan Ab-e Shomali Rural District, in the Central District of Shushtar County, Khuzestan Province, Iran. At the 2006 census, its population was 818, in 177 families.
