= Yobareh =

Yobareh or Yabareh or Yebareh (Persian: يباره) may refer to:

- Yobareh, Ahvaz
- Yabareh, Shushtar
