= Haddam-e Do =

Haddam-e Do هدام دو
- Village
- Location within Iran
- Coordinates: 31°41′35″N 49°02′42″E
- Country: Iran
- Province: Khuzestan
- County: Shushtar
- Bakhsh: Central
- Rural District: Shahid Modarres

Population (2006)
  - Total: 319
- Time zone: UTC+3:30 (IRST)
  - Summer (DST): UTC+4:30 (IRDT)

Haddam-e Do (Persian: هدام دو, also Romanized as Ḩaddām-e Do) is a village in Shahid Modarres Rural District, in the Central District of Shushtar County, Khuzestan Province, Iran. At the 2006 census, its population was 319, in 39 families.
