= Konar Helaleh =

Konar Helaleh كنارهلاله
- Village
- Location within Iran
- Coordinates: 31°50′38″N 49°00′01″E
- Country: Iran
- Province: Khuzestan
- County: Shushtar
- Bakhsh: Central
- Rural District: Shahid Modarres

Population (2006)
  - Total: 119
- Time zone: UTC+3:30 (IRST)
  - Summer (DST): UTC+4:30 (IRDT)

Konar Helaleh (Persian: كنارهلاله, also Romanized as Konār Helāleh; also known as Halāleh and Helāleh) is a village in Shahid Modarres Rural District, in the Central District of Shushtar County, Khuzestan Province, Iran. At the 2006 census, its population was 119, in 23 families.
