= Naqishiat-e Do =

Naqishiat-e Do نقيشيات دو
- Village
- Location within Iran
- Coordinates: 31°43′24″N 48°56′08″E
- Country: Iran
- Province: Khuzestan
- County: Shushtar
- Bakhsh: Central
- Rural District: Miyan Ab

Population (2006)
  - Total: 76
- Time zone: UTC+3:30 (IRST)
  - Summer (DST): UTC+4:30 (IRDT)

Naqishiat-e Do (Persian: نقيشيات دو, also Romanized as Naqīshīāt-e Do) is a village in Miyan Ab Rural District, in the Central District of Shushtar County, Khuzestan Province, Iran. At the 2006 census, its population was 76, in 11 families.
