= Abu Garva-e Do =

Abu Garva-e Do ابوگروادو
- Village
- Location within Iran
- Coordinates: 31°37′48″N 48°46′13″E
- Country: Iran
- Province: Khuzestan
- County: Shushtar
- Bakhsh: Shadravan
- Rural District: Shoaybiyeh-ye Sharqi

Population (2006)
  - Total: 120
- Time zone: UTC+3:30 (IRST)
  - Summer (DST): UTC+4:30 (IRDT)

Abu Garva-e Do (Persian: ابوگروادو, also Romanized as Abū Garvā-e Do) is a village in Shoaybiyeh-ye Sharqi Rural District, Shadravan District, Shushtar County, Khuzestan Province, Iran. At the 2006 census, its population was 120, in 22 families.
