= Shalili-ye Bozorg =

Shalili-ye Bozorg شليلي بزرگ
- Village
- Location within Iran
- Coordinates: 31°58′08″N 48°52′03″E
- Country: Iran
- Province: Khuzestan
- County: Shushtar
- Bakhsh: Central
- Rural District: Miyan Ab-e Shomali

Population (2006)
  - Total: 882
- Time zone: UTC+3:30 (IRST)
  - Summer (DST): UTC+4:30 (IRDT)

Shalili-ye Bozorg (Persian: شليلي بزرگ, also Romanized as Shalīlī-ye Bozorg; also known as Shahaili, Shalīli, and Shalīlī-ye Bālā) is a village in Miyan Ab-e Shomali Rural District, in the Central District of Shushtar County, Khuzestan Province, Iran. At the 2006 census, its population was 882, in 167 families.
