= Bardamil =

Bardamil or Bardmil or Bardemil (Persian: بردميل) may refer to:

- Bardmil, Izeh, Khuzestan Province
- Bardemil, Shushtar, Khuzestan Province
