= Naqishiat-e Yek =

Naqishiat-e Yek نقيشيات يك
- Village
- Location within Iran
- Coordinates: 31°44′02″N 48°56′48″E
- Country: Iran
- Province: Khuzestan
- County: Shushtar
- Bakhsh: Central
- Rural District: Miyan Ab

Population (2006)
  - Total: 228
- Time zone: UTC+3:30 (IRST)
  - Summer (DST): UTC+4:30 (IRDT)

Naqishiat-e Yek (Persian: نقيشيات يك, also Romanized as Naqīshīāt-e Yek; also known as Naghīshīāt, Nagh-i-Shiyāt, and Naqshīāt) is a village in Miyan Ab Rural District, in the Central District of Shushtar County, Khuzestan Province, Iran. At the 2006 census, its population was 228, in 43 families.
