= Tabati =

Tabati تبتي
- Village
- Location within Iran
- Coordinates: 31°57′16″N 48°52′27″E
- Country: Iran
- Province: Khuzestan
- County: Shushtar
- Bakhsh: Central
- Rural District: Miyan Ab-e Shomali

Population (2006)
  - Total: 250
- Time zone: UTC+3:30 (IRST)
  - Summer (DST): UTC+4:30 (IRDT)

Tabati (Persian: تبتي, also Romanized as Tabatī and Tabbatī; also known as Tabalsi) is a village in Miyan Ab-e Shomali Rural District, in the Central District of Shushtar County, Khuzestan Province, Iran. At the 2006 census, its population was 250, in 53 families.
