= Chahar Gav =

Chahar Gav (Persian: چهارگاو) may refer to:

- Chahar Gav Bandi, Kerman Province
- Chahar Gav, Khuzestan
- Chahar Gav, Kurdistan
