= Zabari =

Zabari may refer to:

- Žabari, Serbia
- Zabari, Iran (disambiguation)
- Yossi Zabari
- Moshe Zabari
