= Desim =

Desim may refer to:

- Habibabad, Shushtar, a village in Iran in Shahid Modarres Rural District, in the Central District
- Tunceli, a city in Turkey, it is the capital of Tunceli Province
- Misspelling of Deism
