= Zoviyeh-ye Yek-e Olya =

Village in Khuzestan, Iran

Zoviyeh-ye Yek-e Olya زويه يك عليا
- Village
- Location within Iran
- Coordinates: 31°45′09″N 48°49′11″E
- Country: Iran
- Province: Khuzestan
- County: Shushtar
- Bakhsh: Shadravan
- Rural District: Shoaybiyeh-ye Sharqi

Population (2006)
  - Total: 465
- Time zone: UTC+3:30 (IRST)
  - Summer (DST): UTC+4:30 (IRDT)

Zoviyeh-ye Yek-e Olya (Persian: زويه يك عليا, also Romanized as Zovīyeh-ye Yek-e ‘Olyā; also known as Zoveyeh Yek, Zovīyeh-ye Bālā, Zovīyeh Yek, Zovīyeh-ye ‘Olyā, Zovīyeh-ye Yek, and Zovīyek Yek) is a village in Shoaybiyeh-ye Sharqi Rural District, Shadravan District, Shushtar County, Khuzestan Province, Iran. At the 2006 census, its population was 465, in 89 families.
