= Sharafat, Iran =

City in Khuzestan province, Iran

Sharafat Persian: شرافت
- City
- Location within Iran
- Coordinates: 32°05′21″N 48°46′02″E
- Country: Iran
- Province: Khuzestan
- County: Shushtar
- District: Central

Population (2016)
  - Total: 11,757
- Time zone: UTC+3:30 (IRST)

Sharafat (Persian: شرافت) (Note: Formerly the village of Shahrak-e Shahid Sharafat (شهرك شهيد شرافت), also romanized as Shahrak-e Shahīd Sharāfat) is a city in the Central District of Shushtar County, Khuzestan province, Iran.

== Demographics ==
=== Population ===
At the time of the 2006 National Census, the population was 9,185 in 1,687 households, when it was the village of Shahrak-e Shahid Sharafat in Sardarabad Rural District. The following census in 2011 counted 10,881 people in 2,300 households, by which time the village had been elevated to city status as Sharafat. The 2016 census measured the population of the city as 11,757 people in 2,684 households.
