= Langgar =

Langgar may refer to:

== Places ==
=== Settlements ===
- Langgar, Kedah, Malaysia
- Langgar, Kota Bharu, Kelantan; the location of the Kelantan Royal Mausoleum
- Langgar, Tibet, a village in the Tibet Autonomous Region, China

=== Roads ===
- Pahang State Route C103 (Langgar Road), Pahang, Malaysia
- Jalan Langgar (Kedah), Malaysia

== Other ==
- Langgar (film), a 2013 Malaysian film
- "Langgar", a 2020 song by Insomniacks
- Langgar, a Javanese term for Islamic prayer space equivalent to Surau, adopted by the Wali Songo from the indigenous Javanese monotheistic religion Kapitayan.

== See also ==
- Langar (disambiguation)
