= Shahrak-e Askan Ashayr, Shushtar =

Village in Khuzestan province, Iran

Shahrak-e Askan Ashayr Persian: شهرك اسكان عشاير
- Village
- Country: Iran
- Province: Khuzestan
- County: Shushtar
- District: Central
- Rural District: Sardarabad

Population (2016)
  - Total: 1,776
- Time zone: UTC+3:30 (IRST)

Shahrak-e Askan Ashayr (Persian: شهرك اسكان عشاير) (Note: Also romanized as Shahrak-e Āsḵān ʿAshāyr) is a village in Sardarabad Rural District of the Central District of Shushtar County, Khuzestan province, Iran.

== Demographics ==
=== Population ===
At the time of the 2006 National Census, the village's population was 1,881 in 324 households. The following census in 2011 counted 2,125 people in 434 households. The 2016 census measured the population of the village as 1,776 people in 411 households. It was the most populous village in its rural district.
