= Zebari =

Zebari may refer to:

- Hoshyar Zebari (born 1953), Iraqi politician
- Babaker Zebari, Kurdish politician and general
- Zabari, Iran (disambiguation)
