= Haddam =

Haddam can refer to:

People

- Abdul Halim Khaddam, former foreign minister, vice president and for a few days interim president of Syria

Places

- Haddam, Iran (disambiguation)
- Haddam, Connecticut, United States
- Haddam, Kansas, United States

== See also ==
- Little Hadham, Hertfordshire, England
- Much Hadham, Hertfordshire, England
