= Haddam, Iran =

Haddam (Persian: هدام), in Iran, may refer to:

- Haddam-e Yek
- Haddam-e Do
