= Mehtar, Tajikistan =

Mehtar Меҳтар
- Village
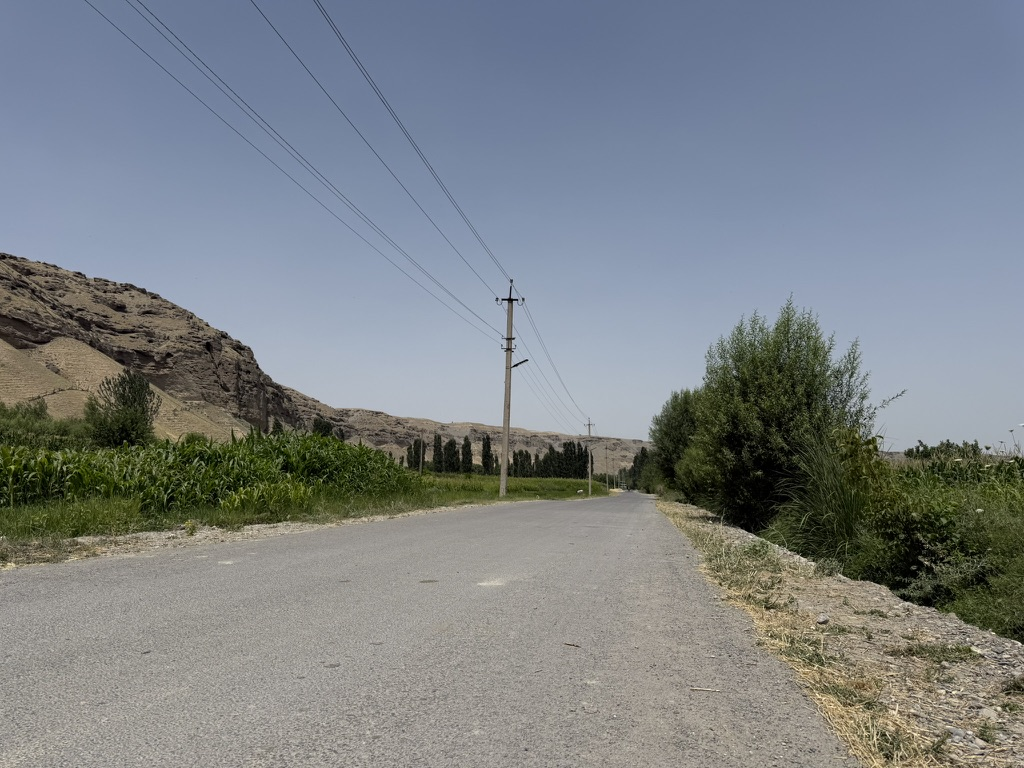
- A central street in Mehtar

- Location in Tajikistan
- Coordinates: 40°03′30.15″N 69°18′22.67″E
- Country: Tajikistan
- Region: Sughd Region
- District: Spitamen District

Population (2017)
  - Total: 2,505
- Time zone: UTC+5 (TJT)
- Postal code: 735811

Mehtar (Tajik: Меҳтар), also spelled Mitar (Tajik: Митар), is a village in north-western Tajikistan. It is located in Spitamen District of Sughd Region, on the left bank of the Ak-Suu River, opposite the village of Langar on the right bank. The village lies a few kilometers downstream from Alga, a village in neighboring Kyrgyzstan. As of 2017, Mehtar had a population of 2,505.
