= Nur-Ali =

Nur-Ali may refer to:

- Nur-Ali (name)
- Nur Ali, Iran
