= Tabbat =

Tabbat or Tabat (Persian: تبت) may refer to:

- Tabbat, Bukan, a village in Behi-e Feyzolah Beygi Rural District, in the Central District of Bukan County, West Azerbaijan Province, Iran
- Tabbat, Urmia, a village in Torkaman Rural District, in the Central District of Urmia County, West Azerbaijan Province, Iran

== See also ==
- Tabati (also Romanized as Tabatī and Tabbatī; also known as Tabalsi), a village in Miyan Ab-e Shomali Rural District, in the Central District of Shushtar County, Khuzestan Province, Iran
