= Zoviyeh-ye Do =

Village in Khuzestan province, Iran

Zoviyeh-ye Do Persian: زويه دو
- Village
- Location within Iran
- Coordinates: 31°44′39″N 48°49′06″E
- Country: Iran
- Province: Khuzestan
- County: Shushtar
- District: Shoaybiyeh
- Rural District: Shoaybiyeh-ye Sharqi

Population (2016)
  - Total: 1,180
- Time zone: UTC+3:30 (IRST)

Zoviyeh-ye Do (Persian: زويه دو) (Note: Also romanized as Zoveyeh Do, Zovīyeh Do, and Zovīyeh-ye Do; also known as Zovīyeh-ye Pā’īn) is a village in, and the capital of, Shoaybiyeh-ye Sharqi Rural District of Shoaybiyeh District, (Note: Formerly Shadravan District) Shushtar County, Khuzestan province, Iran.

== Demographics ==
=== Population ===
At the time of the 2006 national census, the village's population was 998 in 160 households. The following census in 2011 counted 1,206 people in 237 households. The 2016 census measured the population of the village as 1,180 people in 293 households. It was the most populous village in its rural district.
