= Zoviyeh-ye Yek-e Sofla =

Village in Khuzestan, Iran

Zoviyeh-ye Yek-e Sofla زويه يك سفلي
- Village
- Location within Iran
- Coordinates: 31°45′03″N 48°49′16″E
- Country: Iran
- Province: Khuzestan
- County: Shushtar
- Bakhsh: Shadravan
- Rural District: Shoaybiyeh-ye Sharqi

Population (2006)
  - Total: 546
- Time zone: UTC+3:30 (IRST)
  - Summer (DST): UTC+4:30 (IRDT)

Zoviyeh-ye Yek-e Sofla (Persian: زويه يك سفلي, also Romanized as Zovīyeh-ye Yek-e Soflá; also known as Zovīyeh-ye Pā’īn) is a village in Shoaybiyeh-ye Sharqi Rural District, Shadravan District, Shushtar County, Khuzestan Province, Iran. At the 2006 census, its population was 546, in 96 families.
