= Jenish, Leylek =

Jenish Kyrgyz: Жеңиш
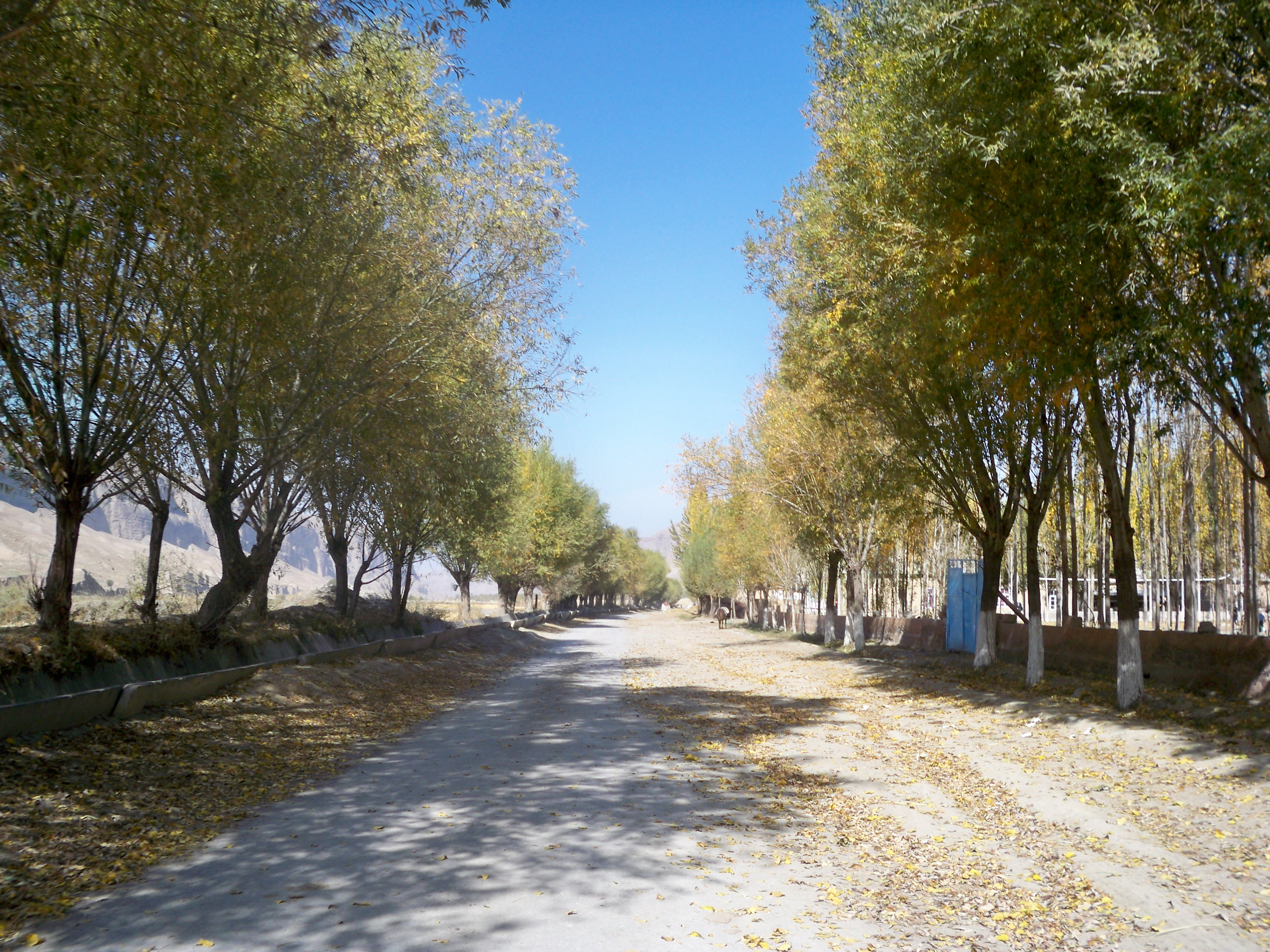

- Location within Kyrgyzstan
- Coordinates: 39°56′39″N 69°22′37″E
- Country: Kyrgyzstan
- Region: Batken
- District: Leylek
- Elevation: 841 m (2,759 ft)

Population (2022)
  - Total: 1,655
- Time zone: UTC+6

Jenish (Kyrgyz: Жеңиш), also called Choyunchu (Kyrgyz: Чоюнчу), is a village in Batken Region of Kyrgyzstan. It is part of the Ak-Suu Rural Administration in Leylek District. Its population was 1,655 in 2022, up from 1,241 in 2009.

Jenish adjoins the village of Alga and lies along the Ak-Suu River. It is located 16 km (10 mi) northwest of the district capital, Razzakov.

== Population ==
Historical population
Year	Pop.	±% p.a.
2009	1,241	—
2022	1,655	+2.24%
Note: resident population; Sources:
