= Zabari, Iran =

Zabari or Zebari or Zobari (Persian: زباري) may refer to:

- Zabari 1, Khuzestan Province
- Zabari 2, Khuzestan Province
- Zabari, Razavi Khorasan
