= Langar, Spitamen =

Langar Лангар
- Village
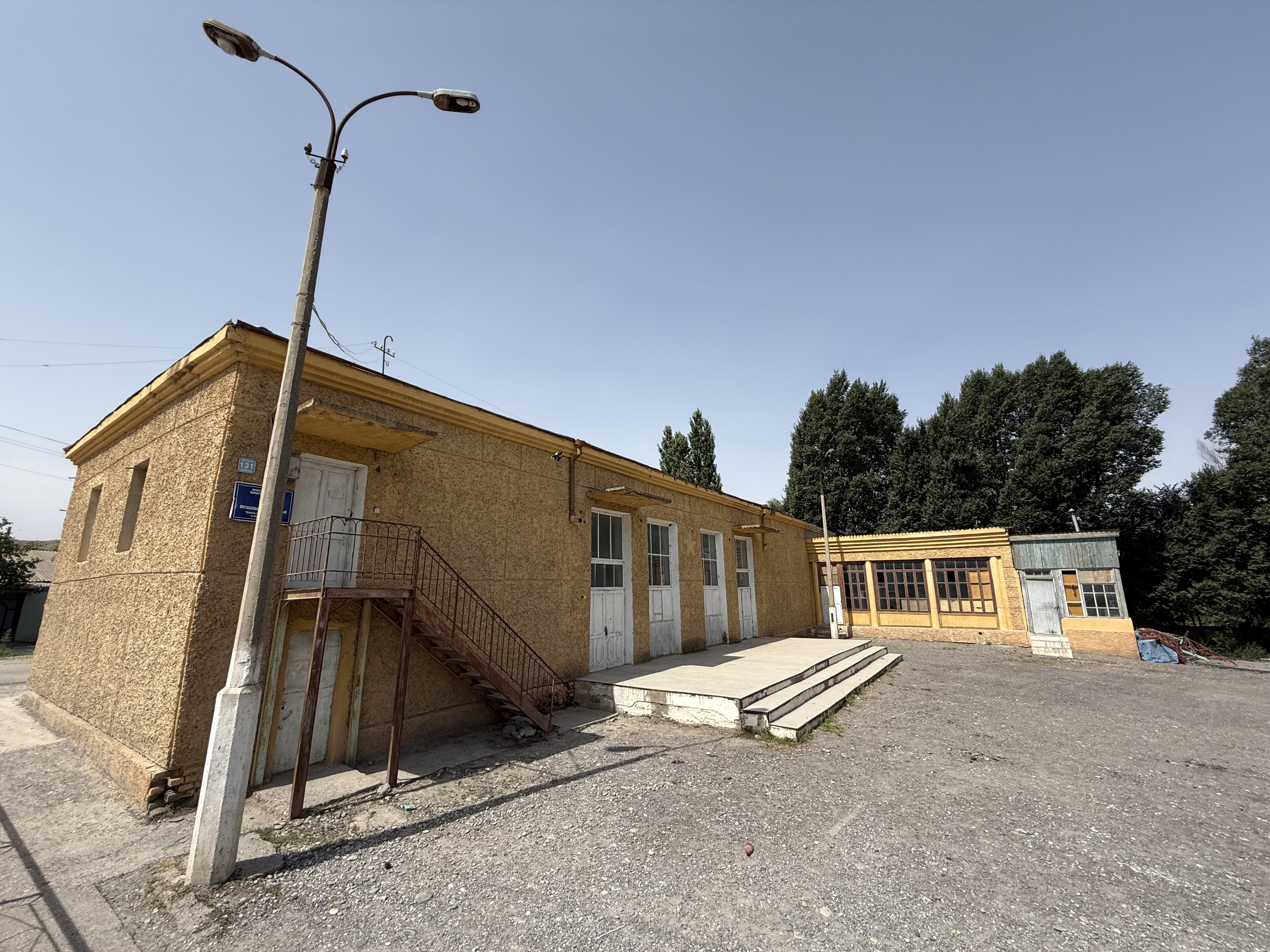
- Langar Library in 2025

- Location in Tajikistan
- Coordinates: 40°03′32.24″N 69°19′12.22″E
- Country: Tajikistan
- Region: Sughd Region
- District: Spitamen District

Population (2017)
  - Total: 3,542
- Time zone: UTC+5 (TJT)

Langar (Tajik: Лангар) is a village in north-western Tajikistan. It is located in Spitamen District of Sughd Region, on the right bank of the Ak-Suu River, opposite the village of Mehtar on the left bank. The village lies a few kilometers downstream from Alga, a village in neighboring Kyrgyzstan. As of 2017, Langar had a population of 3,542.

Langar is notable for the Langar Ota religious shrine, which is believed to date to the 14th century.
