= Guriyeh =

City in Khuzestan province, Iran

Guriyeh Persian: گوريه
- City
- Location within Iran
- Coordinates: 31°51′26″N 48°45′22″E
- Country: Iran
- Province: Khuzestan
- County: Shushtar
- District: Shoaybiyeh

Population (2016)
  - Total: 2,890
- Time zone: UTC+3:30 (IRST)

Guriyeh (Persian: گوريه) (Note: Also Romanized as Gūrīyeh and Gūreyeh) is a city in, and the capital of, Shoaybiyeh District (Note: Formerly Shadravan District) of Shushtar County, Khuzestan province, Iran. It also serves as the administrative center for Shoaybiyeh-ye Gharbi Rural District. (Note: Formerly Shoaybiyeh Rural District)

== Demographics ==
=== Population ===
At the time of the 2006 National Census, Guriyeh's population was 2,366 in 471 households, when it was a village in Shoaybiyeh-ye Gharbi Rural District. The following census in 2011 counted 2,991 people in 579 households, by which time the village had been elevated to the status of a city. The 2016 census measured the population of the city as 2,890 people in 697 households.
