= Chahar Gav Bandi =

Chahar Gav Bandi چهارگاوبندي
- Village
- Location within Iran
- Coordinates: 28°32′24″N 57°47′34″E
- Country: Iran
- Province: Kerman
- County: Jiroft
- Bakhsh: Central
- Rural District: Eslamabad

Population (2006)
  - Total: 208
- Time zone: UTC+3:30 (IRST)
  - Summer (DST): UTC+4:30 (IRDT)

Chahar Gav Bandi (Persian: چهارگاوبندي, also Romanized as Chahār Gāv Bandī) is a village in Eslamabad Rural District, in the Central District of Jiroft County, Kerman Province, Iran. At the 2006 census, its population was 208, in 40 families.
