= Langar, Rabor =

Langar لنگر
- Village
- Location within Iran
- Coordinates: 29°14′13″N 56°54′53″E
- Country: Iran
- Province: Kerman
- County: Rabor
- Bakhsh: Central
- Rural District: Rabor

Population (2006)
  - Total: 54
- Time zone: UTC+3:30 (IRST)
  - Summer (DST): UTC+4:30 (IRDT)

Langar (Persian: لنگر) is a village in Rabor Rural District, in the Central District of Rabor County, Kerman Province, Iran. At the 2006 census, its population was 54, in 12 families.
