= Bardmil, Izeh =

Bardmil بردميل
- Village
- Location within Iran
- Coordinates: 32°01′11″N 49°54′40″E
- Country: Iran
- Province: Khuzestan
- County: Izeh
- Bakhsh: Susan
- Rural District: Susan-e Gharbi

Population (2006)
  - Total: 493
- Time zone: UTC+3:30 (IRST)
  - Summer (DST): UTC+4:30 (IRDT)

Bardmil (Persian: بردميل, also Romanized as Bardmīl; also known as Bardmīl-e Yek) is a village in Susan-e Gharbi Rural District, Susan District, Izeh County, Khuzestan Province, Iran. At the 2006 census, its population was 493, in 71 families.
