= Shahrak-e Shahid Beheshti, Fars =

Shahrak-e Shahid Beheshti شهرك شهيدبهشتي
- Village
- Location within Iran
- Coordinates: 29°43′19″N 52°26′26″E
- Country: Iran
- Province: Fars
- County: Shiraz
- Bakhsh: Central
- Rural District: Derak

Population (2006)
  - Total: 6,428
- Time zone: UTC+3:30 (IRST)
  - Summer (DST): UTC+4:30 (IRDT)

Shahrak-e Shahid Beheshti (Persian: شهرك شهيدبهشتي, also Romanized as Shahrak-e Shahīd Beheshtī) is a village in Derak Rural District, in the Central District of Shiraz County, Fars province, Iran. At the 2006 census, its population was 6,428, in 1,737 families.
