= Yossi Zabari =

Israeli stage actor, stand-up comedian, spoken word artist and dancer

- יוסי צברי
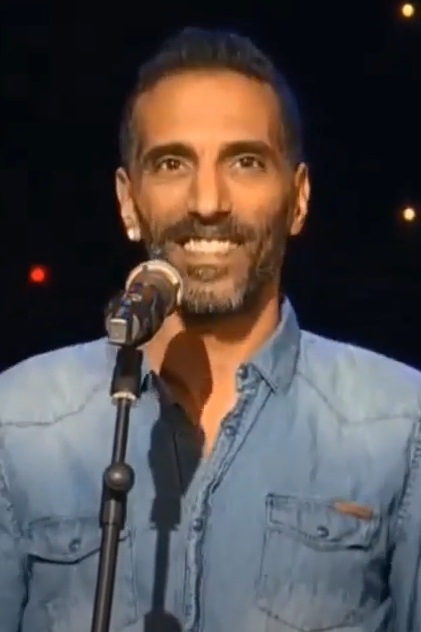
- Yossi Zabari, 2016
- Born: 1972 (age 53–54); Petah Tikva, Israel
- Occupations: actor; comedian; spoken word artist; dancer
- Years active: 1996–present
- Website: zabari.co.il

Joseph (Yossi) Zabari (Hebrew: יוסי צברי; born: 1972) is an Israeli actor, comedian, poet, spoken-word artist and dancer. Zabari is also a regular speaker at pro-democracy rallies held across Israel after coming to prominence through the various spoken word videos he posted online in which he articulates rhymes about political and social issues.

== Biography ==
=== Early years ===
Yossi Zabari was born in Petah Tikva, the youngest son of Shula and David Zabari who immigrated from Yemen when they were ten years-old. Between 1996 and 1998 Zabari attended the Beit Zvi School of Performing Arts. During his studies Zabari took part, among others, in the plays "The Caucasian Chalk Circle" by Bertolt Brecht and Anton Chekhov's "The Wood Demon" and received numerous scholarships from the Sharet Fund, Sano, and scholarships from Beit Zvi named after Moshe Zairi, Shmuel Segal, Giora Godik and more. In 1996 Zabari took part in the kids album "Zohar's Dimples" (גומות החן של זהר). In 1998, he took part in the Akko Festival with a one-man performance he produced entitled "Happy Birthday" (יום הולדת שמח). Later on he participated in a number of children's plays in the private sector.

=== Career ===
He began his career path doing Repertory theatre at the Cameri Theatre in Tel-Aviv while participating in the productions "Murder" (רצח) by Hanoch Levin and "Herod" (הורדוס) by Edna Mazia.

In 2000, he participated in the children's tape "Uncle Pompa" (דוד פומפה) where he dubbed the character of Rachamim.

Between 2001 and 2003 Zabari attended the Broadway School of Dance in New York City. Upon his return to Israel, he appeared mainly in commercial productions, dance productions and fringe theatre. Later, he took on the role of Pharaoh in a theatre production of "Moses" by Dudu Topaz which was directed by Moshe Kaptan (who later went on to become the artistic director at Habima Theatre). Zabari also took part in a theatre production of "Pinocchio" based on the book by Carlo Collodi at the Meditec Theatre in Holon. In addition, Zabari took on the lead in the dance production "Dream At the Tip of the Fingers" (חלום בקצה האצבעות – based on the film "Billy Elliot"), "The Wedding" (החתונה) and other productions. He later went on to take part in a satirical cabaret directed by Dalit Milstein.

In 2009, Zabari started performing at the Beer Sheva Theatre, in "The Count of Monte Cristo" a rendition by Ido Riklin based upon the book by Alexandre Dumas, Molier's "Le Malade Imaginaire", Shakspear's "Much Ado About Nothing", Henrik Ibsen's "Traitor", and "Life of Galileo" by Bertolt Brecht. At a Short Theatre Festival at Tzavta Theatre in Tel-Aviv, Zabari took part in the opereta "The Jiljul" by Yoni Lahav directed by Tal Brener. He also played the executioner in the opereta "Mikado" by Gilbert and Sullivan and later on played the part of Winston in the play "The Island" by Ethol Fogard directed by Itay Tiran.

In 2013, Zabari returned as casting director for the Cameri Theatre. Participated in the play "Little Man, What Now?" (איש קטן, מה עכשיו) a play by Hans Fallada directed by Itay Tiran. Cyrano de Bergerac by Edmond Rostand directed by Gilad Kimchi, "Ivanov" by Anton Chekhov directed by Arthur Kugen. "Love Sick in Neighborhood C" (חולה אהבה בשיכון ג') by Savi Gabizon directed by Edna Mazia. Participated in the international project "Move, You're Blocking the Sun" (זוז אתה מסתיר לי את השמש) directed by Efrat Henig, which consisted of an Israeli and Arab ensemble and was staged in Israel, Germany, Switzerland, Liechtenstein and more.

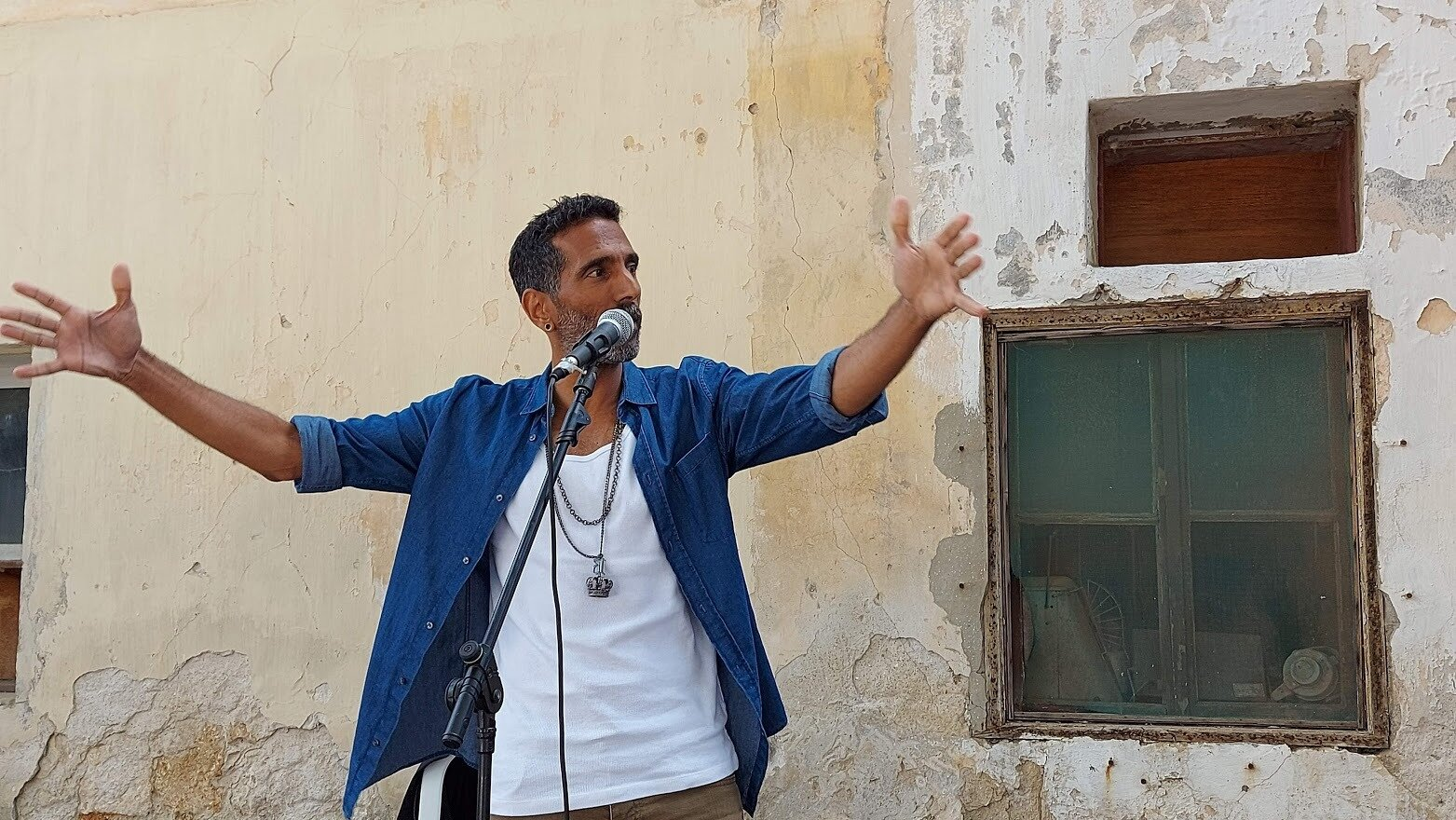
Yossi Zabari, 2021

In 2016 Zabari began acting at Beit Lessin in a play entitled "His Name is King" (קוראים לו מלך) by Savion Librecht directed by Alon Ofir. He also took part ina fringe theatre play "The Recuperation Home of Time" (בית ההבראה של הזמן) based on short stories by Bruno Schultz directed by Yafim Kutcher.

Over time, Zabari produced a number of one-man shows, among which are "Yossi Zabari: Simple" (יוסי צברי. פשוט) (2004–2005), "Poetry Slam", and "Queer and Sensual Standup" (2015–2016). These shows incorporated short monologues, dance and rhyming poetry and touched on personal experiences of Zabari throughout his life.

On television, Zabari starred in the Israeli sitcom "The Azani Family" (משפחת עזאני) on Channel 2, hosted a music program on YES and guest starred on various programs on the Israeli Children's Network as well as various other television shows.

Since 2018, Zabari stars on the internet show "Burned" (שרופים) on the Teddy Channel.

In 2019 he appeared in the comedy film "Bezmek". That same year he went on to win 1st place at the annual Israel "Poetry Slam Contest" and went on to represent Israel in Paris.

In addition to his work as an actor, Zabari is also a teacher at Beit Zvi as well as director of plays. Zabari also lectures to Israeli students as well as students throughout the world about Israeli culture.

== Personal life ==
Zabari is an openly gay man, married to Nir Yanai, a graphic artist, and lives in Tel-Aviv. The two are parents to a son who was born in 2020.
