= Langariz =

Langariz لنگريز
- Village
- Location within Iran
- Coordinates: 35°14′54″N 46°30′58″E
- Country: Iran
- Province: Kurdistan
- County: Sanandaj
- Bakhsh: Kalatrazan
- Rural District: Negel

Population (2006)
  - Total: 243
- Time zone: UTC+3:30 (IRST)
  - Summer (DST): UTC+4:30 (IRDT)

Langariz (Persian: لنگريز, also Romanized as Langarīz and Langrīz; also known as Langār, Langares, Langarīs, Langar Riz) is a village in Negel Rural District, Kalatrazan District, Sanandaj County, Kurdistan Province, Iran. At the 2006 census, its population was 243, in 71 families. The village is populated by Kurds.
