= Shahrak-e Askan Ashayir, Behbahan =

Shahrak-e Askan Ashayir شهرك اسكان عشاير
- Village
- Country: Iran
- Province: Khuzestan
- County: Behbahan
- Bakhsh: Central
- Rural District: Howmeh

Population (2006)
  - Total: 116
- Time zone: UTC+3:30 (IRST)
  - Summer (DST): UTC+4:30 (IRDT)

Shahrak-e Askan Ashayir (Persian: شهرك اسكان عشاير, also Romanized as Shahrak-e Āskān ʿAshāyīr) is a village in Howmeh Rural District, in the Central District of Behbahan County, Khuzestan Province, Iran. At the 2006 census, its population was 116, in 24 families.
