= Farsiyeh, Razavi Khorasan =

Farsiyeh فارسيه
- Village
- Location within Iran
- Coordinates: 36°31′17″N 58°32′03″E
- Country: Iran
- Province: Razavi Khorasan
- County: Nishapur
- Bakhsh: Central
- Rural District: Binalud

Population (2006)
  - Total: 33
- Time zone: UTC+3:30 (IRST)
  - Summer (DST): UTC+4:30 (IRDT)

Farsiyeh (Persian: فارسيه, also Romanized as Fārsīyeh and Farsīyeh; also known as Dāf) is a village in Binalud Rural District, in the Central District of Nishapur County, Razavi Khorasan Province, Iran. At the 2006 census, its population was 33, in 10 families.
