= Miyan Ab District =

District in Khuzestan province, Iran

Miyan Ab District Persian: بخش میان‌آب
- District
- Location within Iran
- Coordinates: 31°50′43″N 48°53′16″E
- Country: Iran
- Province: Khuzestan
- County: Shushtar
- Capital: Arab Hasan

Population (2016)
  - Total: 32,177
- Time zone: UTC+3:30 (IRST)

Miyan Ab District (Persian: بخش میان‌آب) is in Shushtar County, Khuzestan province, Iran. Its capital is the village of Arab Hasan.

== History ==
After the 2011 census, Miyan Ab (Note: Renamed Miyan Ab-e Jonubi Rural District) and Miyan Ab-e Shomali Rural Districts were separated from the Central District in the formation of Miyan Ab District, and the village of Sardarabad was elevated to city status as Sardaran.

== Demographics ==
=== Population ===
At the time of the 2016 census, the district's population was 32,177 inhabitants in 8,395 households.

=== Administrative divisions ===
Miyan Ab District Population
| Administrative Divisions | 2016 |
|---|---|
| Miyan Ab-e Jonubi RD (Note: Formerly Miyan Ab Rural District) | 10,517 |
| Miyan Ab-e Shomali RD | 21,660 |
| Total | 32,177 |
RD = Rural District
