= Langar Barani =

Langar Barani لنگر باراني
- Village
- Location within Iran
- Coordinates: 31°13′04″N 61°38′37″E
- Country: Iran
- Province: Sistan and Baluchestan
- County: Hirmand
- Bakhsh: Qorqori
- Rural District: Qorqori

Population (2006)
  - Total: 388
- Time zone: UTC+3:30 (IRST)
  - Summer (DST): UTC+4:30 (IRDT)

Langar Barani (Persian: لنگر باراني, also romanized as Langar Bārānī; also known as Bārānī and Langar) is a village in Qorqori Rural District, Qorqori District, Hirmand County, Sistan and Baluchestan Province, Iran. At the 2006 census, its population was 388, in 75 families.
