= Abd-ol Seyyed, Ahvaz =

Abd-ol Seyyed عبدالسيد
- Village
- Country: Iran
- Province: Khuzestan
- County: Ahvaz
- Bakhsh: Central
- Rural District: Gheyzaniyeh

Population (2006)
  - Total: 75
- Time zone: UTC+3:30 (IRST)
  - Summer (DST): UTC+4:30 (IRDT)

Abd-ol Seyyed (Persian: عبدالسيد, also Romanized as ʿAbd-ol Seyyed) is a village in Gheyzaniyeh Rural District, in the Central District of Ahvaz County, Khuzestan Province, Iran. At the 2006 census, its population was 75, in 13 families.
