= Shahrak-e Shahid Beheshti, Bampur =

Shahrak-e Shahid Beheshti شهرك شهيدبهشتي
- Village
- Location within Iran
- Coordinates: 27°10′46″N 60°33′25″E
- Country: Iran
- Province: Sistan and Baluchestan
- County: Bampur
- Bakhsh: Central
- Rural District: Bampur-e Sharqi

Population (2006)
  - Total: 1,136
- Time zone: UTC+3:30 (IRST)
  - Summer (DST): UTC+4:30 (IRDT)

Shahrak-e Shahid Beheshti (Persian: شهرك شهيدبهشتي, also Romanized as Shahrak-e Shahīd Beheshtī; also known as Shahrak-e Shahīd Beheshtī-ye Khowrāb) is a village in Bampur-e Sharqi Rural District, in the Central District of Bampur County, Sistan and Baluchestan Province, Iran. At the 2006 census, its population was 1,136, in 223 families.
