= Gharib-e Deylam-e Sofla =

Gharib-e Deylam-e Sofla غريب ديلم سفلي
- Village
- Location within Iran
- Coordinates: 32°08′10″N 48°26′15″E
- Country: Iran
- Province: Khuzestan
- County: Dezful
- Bakhsh: Central
- Rural District: Shamsabad

Population (2006)
  - Total: 100
- Time zone: UTC+3:30 (IRST)
  - Summer (DST): UTC+4:30 (IRDT)

Gharib-e Deylam-e Sofla (Persian: غريب ديلم سفلي, also Romanized as Gharīb-e Deylam-e Soflá; also known as Deylam-e ‘Oqāb, Deylam-e Pā’īn, Deylam Oqāb, and ‘Oz̄ayyeb) is a village in Shamsabad Rural District, in the Central District of Dezful County, Khuzestan Province, Iran. At the 2006 census, its population was 100, in 21 families.
