= Sardaran, Iran =

City in Khuzestan province, Iran

Sardaran Persian: سرداران
- City
- Location within Iran
- Coordinates: 32°01′14″N 48°47′21″E
- Country: Iran
- Province: Khuzestan
- County: Shushtar
- District: Central

Population (2016)
  - Total: 5,240
- Time zone: UTC+3:30 (IRST)

Sardaran (Persian: سرداران) (Note: Formerly the village of Sardarabad (سرداراباد), also romanized as Sardārābād) is a city in the Central District of Shushtar County, Khuzestan province, Iran, serving as the administrative center for Sardarabad Rural District.

== Demographics ==
=== Population ===
At the time of the 2006 National Census, the population was 4,834 in 953 households, when it was the village of Sardarabad in Sardarabad Rural District. The following census in 2011 counted 5,134 people in 1,177 households. The 2016 census measured the population as 5,240 people in 1,328 households, by which time the village had been elevated to the status of a city and its name changed to Sardaran.
