= Shahrak-e Shahid Beheshti, Hirmand =

Shahrak-e Shahid Beheshti شهرك شهيدبهشتي
- Village
- Location within Iran
- Coordinates: 30°53′43″N 61°33′59″E
- Country: Iran
- Province: Sistan and Baluchestan
- County: Hirmand
- Bakhsh: Central
- Rural District: Dust Mohammad

Population (2006)
  - Total: 785
- Time zone: UTC+3:30 (IRST)
  - Summer (DST): UTC+4:30 (IRDT)

Shahrak-e Shahid Beheshti (Persian: شهرك شهيدبهشتي, also Romanized as Shahrak-e Shahīd Beheshtī) is a village in Dust Mohammad Rural District, in the Central District of Hirmand County, Sistan and Baluchestan Province, Iran. At the 2006 census, its population was 785, in 154 families.
