= Korrehi, Marvdasht =

Korrehi كره اي
- Village
- Location within Iran
- Coordinates: 29°50′54″N 53°05′57″E
- Country: Iran
- Province: Fars
- County: Marvdasht
- Bakhsh: Seyyedan
- Rural District: Rahmat

Population (2006)
  - Total: 1,170
- Time zone: UTC+3:30 (IRST)
  - Summer (DST): UTC+4:30 (IRDT)

Korrehi (Persian: كره اي, also Romanized as Korreh’ī; also known as Korā’ī, Korranī, and Korūnī) is a village in Rahmat Rural District, Seyyedan District, Marvdasht County, Fars province, Iran. At the 2006 census, its population was 1,170, in 291 families.
