= Alga, Leylek =

Alga Kyrgyz: Алга
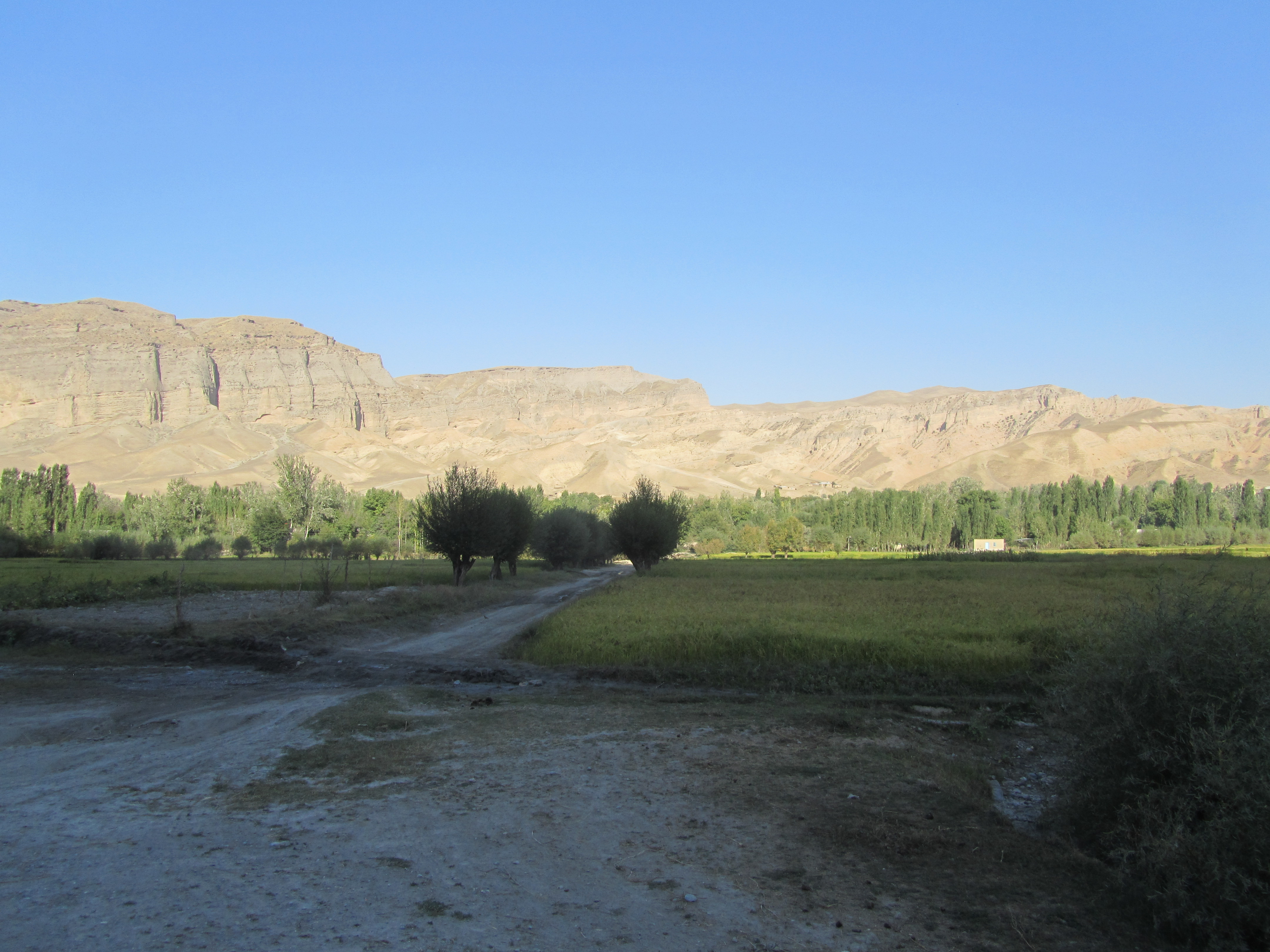

- Location within Kyrgyzstan
- Coordinates: 39°58′0.52″N 69°22′18.48″E
- Country: Kyrgyzstan
- Region: Batken
- District: Leylek
- Elevation: 841 m (2,759 ft)

Population (2022)
  - Total: 1,607
- Time zone: UTC+6

Alga (Kyrgyz: Алга), also called Jar-Kyshtak (Kyrgyz: Жар-Кыштак), is a village in Batken Region of Kyrgyzstan. It is part of the Ak-Suu Rural Administration in Leylek District. Its population was 1,607 in 2022, up from 1,022 in 2009.

Alga adjoins the village of Jenish and lies along the Ak-Suu River. It is located 19 km (12 mi) northwest of the district capital, Razzakov.

== Population ==
Historical population
Year	Pop.	±% p.a.
2009	1,022	—
2021	1,439	+2.89%
2022	1,607	+11.67%
Note: resident population; Sources:
