= Sardarabad Rural District =

Rural district in Khuzestan province, Iran

Sardarabad Rural District Persian: دهستان سردارآباد
- Rural District
- Location within Iran
- Coordinates: 32°01′47″N 48°43′15″E
- Country: Iran
- Province: Khuzestan
- County: Shushtar
- District: Central
- Capital: Sardaran

Population (2016)
  - Total: 9,026
- Time zone: UTC+3:30 (IRST)

Sardarabad Rural District (Persian: دهستان سردارآباد) is in the Central District of Shushtar County, Khuzestan province, Iran. It is administered from the city of Sardaran. (Note: Formerly the village of Sardarabad)

== Demographics ==
=== Population ===
At the time of the 2006 National Census, the rural district's population was 23,930 in 4,464 households. There were 17,105 inhabitants in 3,393 households at the following census of 2011. The 2016 census measured the population of the rural district as 9,026 in 1,969 households. The most populous of its 28 villages was Shahrak-e Askan Ashayr, with 1,776 people.
