= Shoaybiyeh-ye Gharbi Rural District =

Rural district in Khuzestan province, Iran

Shoaybiyeh-ye Gharbi Rural District Persian: دهستان شعیبیه غربی
- Rural District
- Location within Iran
- Coordinates: 31°48′49″N 48°42′48″E
- Country: Iran
- Province: Khuzestan
- County: Shushtar
- District: Shoaybiyeh
- Capital: Guriyeh

Population (2016)
  - Total: 10,658
- Time zone: UTC+3:30 (IRST)

Shoaybiyeh-ye Gharbi Rural District (Persian: دهستان شعیبیه غربی) (Note: Formerly Shoaybiyeh Rural District (دهستان شعیبیه)) is in Shoaybiyeh District (Note: Formerly Shadravan District) of Shushtar County, Khuzestan province, Iran. It is administered from the city of Guriyeh.

== Demographics ==
=== Population ===
At the time of the 2006 National Census, the rural district's population was 13,254 in 2,454 households. There were 11,253 inhabitants in 2,578 households at the following census of 2011. The 2016 census measured the population of the rural district as 10,658 in 2,665 households. The most populous of its 37 villages was Emam Khomeyni Cultivation and Industry, with 1,137 people.
