= Miyan Ab-e Jonubi Rural District =

Rural district in Khuzestan province, Iran

Miyan Ab-e Jonubi Rural District Persian: دهستان میان‌آب جنوبی
- Rural District
- Location within Iran
- Coordinates: 31°47′01″N 48°55′27″E
- Country: Iran
- Province: Khuzestan
- County: Shushtar
- District: Miyan Ab
- Capital: Arab Hasan

Population (2016)
  - Total: 10,517
- Time zone: UTC+3:30 (IRST)

Miyan Ab-e Jonubi Rural District (Persian: دهستان میان‌آب جنوبی) (Note: Formerly Miyan Ab Rural District (دهستان میان‌آب)) is in Miyan Ab District of Shushtar County, Khuzestan province, Iran. Its capital is the village of Arab Hasan.

== Demographics ==
=== Population ===
At the time of the 2006 National Census, the rural district's population (as Miyan Ab Rural District (Note: Renamed Miyan Ab-e Jonubi Rural District) of the Central District) was 10,518 in 1,717 households. There were 10,352 inhabitants in 2,381 households at the following census of 2011. The 2016 census measured the population of the rural district as 10,517 in 2,772 households, by which time it had been separated from the district in the establishment of Miyan Ab District and its name changed to Miyan Ab-e Jonubi Rural District. The most populous of its 36 villages was Arab Hasan, with 2,268 people.
