= Miyan Ab-e Shomali Rural District =

Rural district in Khuzestan province, Iran

Miyan Ab-e Shomali Rural District Persian: دهستان ميان آب شمالي
- Rural District
- Location within Iran
- Coordinates: 31°56′44″N 48°52′45″E
- Country: Iran
- Province: Khuzestan
- County: Shushtar
- District: Miyan Ab
- Established: 1990
- Capital: Mehdiabad

Population (2016)
  - Total: 21,660
- Time zone: UTC+3:30 (IRST)

Miyan Ab-e Shomali Rural District (Persian: دهستان ميان آب شمالي) is in Miyan Ab District of Shushtar County, Khuzestan province, Iran. Its capital is the village of Mehdiabad.

== Demographics ==
=== Population ===
At the time of the 2006 National Census, the rural district's population (as a part of the Central District) was 22,341 in 4,285 households. There were 13,475 inhabitants in 3,378 households at the following census of 2011. The 2016 census measured the population of the rural district as 21,660 in 5,623 households, by which time the rural district had been separated from the district in the formation of Miyan Ab District. The most populous of its 53 villages was Gavmishabad, with 5,722 people.
