= Shoaybiyeh-ye Sharqi Rural District =

Rural district in Khuzestan province, Iran

Shoaybiyeh-ye Sharqi Rural District Persian: دهستان شعیبیه شرقی
- Rural District
- Location within Iran
- Coordinates: 31°44′55″N 48°48′55″E
- Country: Iran
- Province: Khuzestan
- County: Shushtar
- District: Shoaybiyeh
- Established: 2005
- Capital: Zoviyeh-ye Do

Population (2016)
  - Total: 7,112
- Time zone: UTC+3:30 (IRST)

Shoaybiyeh-ye Sharqi Rural District (Persian: دهستان شعیبیه شرقی) is in Shoaybiyeh District (Note: Formerly Shadravan District) of Shushtar County, Khuzestan province, Iran. Its capital is the village of Zoviyeh-ye Do.

== Demographics ==
=== Population ===
At the time of the 2006 National Census, the rural district's population was 7,314 in 1,203 households. There were 7,536 inhabitants in 1,589 households at the following census of 2011. The 2016 census measured the population of the rural district as 7,112 in 1,846 households. The most populous of its 23 villages was Zoviyeh-ye Do, with 1,180 people.
