= Shahid Modarres Rural District =

Rural district in Khuzestan province, Iran

Shahid Modarres Rural District Persian: دهستان شهيد مدرس
- Rural District
- Location within Iran
- Coordinates: 31°53′40″N 49°03′33″E
- Country: Iran
- Province: Khuzestan
- County: Shushtar
- District: Central
- Capital: Darkhazineh

Population (2016)
  - Total: 11,139
- Time zone: UTC+3:30 (IRST)

Shahid Modarres Rural District (Persian: دهستان شهيد مدرس) is in the Central District of Shushtar County, Khuzestan province, Iran. Its capital is the village of Darkhazineh.

== Demographics ==
=== Population ===
At the time of the 2006 National Census, the rural district's population was 10,801 in 2,022 households. There were 10,596 inhabitants in 2,475 households at the following census of 2011. The 2016 census measured the population of the rural district as 11,139 in 2,889 households. The most populous of its 76 villages was Pirdalu, with 2,300 people.
