= Shoaybiyeh District =

District in Khuzestan province, Iran

Shoaybiyeh District Persian: بخش شعیبیه
- District
- Location within Iran
- Coordinates: 31°47′51″N 48°43′16″E
- Country: Iran
- Province: Khuzestan
- County: Shushtar
- Capital: Guriyeh

Population (2016)
  - Total: 20,660
- Time zone: UTC+3:30 (IRST)

Shoaybiyeh District (Persian: بخش شعیبیه) (Note: Formerly Shadravan District (بخش شادروان)) is in Shushtar County, Khuzestan province, Iran. Its capital is the city of Guriyeh.

== History ==
After the 2006 National Census, the village of Guriyeh was elevated to the status of a city.

== Demographics ==
=== Population ===
At the time of the 2006 census, the district's population (as Shadravan District) was 20,568 in 3,657 households. The following census in 2011 counted 21,780 people in 4,746 households. The 2016 census measured the population of the district as 20,660 inhabitants in 5,208 households.

=== Administrative divisions ===
Shoaybiyeh District Population
Administrative Divisions	2006	2011	2016
Shoaybiyeh-ye Gharbi RD (Note: Formerly Shoaybiyeh Rural District)	13,254	11,253	10,658
Shoaybiyeh-ye Sharqi RD	7,314	7,536	7,112
Guriyeh (city)		2,991	2,890
Total	20,568	21,780	20,660
RD = Rural District
