= Central District (Shushtar County) =

District in Khuzestan province, Iran

Central District (Shushtar County) Persian: بخش مرکزی شهرستان شوشتر
- District
- Location within Iran
- Coordinates: 31°53′40″N 49°00′36″E
- Country: Iran
- Province: Khuzestan
- County: Shushtar
- Capital: Shushtar

Population (2016)
  - Total: 139,040
- Time zone: UTC+3:30 (IRST)

The Central District of Shushtar County (Persian: بخش مرکزی شهرستان شوشتر) is in Khuzestan province, Iran. Its capital is the city of Shushtar.

== History ==
After the 2006 National Census, the village of Shahrak-e Shahid Sharafat rose to city status as Sharafat. After the 2011 census, Miyan Ab (Note: Renamed Miyan Ab-e Jonubi Rural District) and Miyan Ab-e Shomali Rural Districts were separated from the district in the formation of Miyan Ab District, and the village of Sardarabad was elevated to city status as Sardaran.

== Demographics ==
=== Population ===
At the time of the 2006 census, the Central District's population was 161,714 in 33,999 households. The following census in 2011 counted 169,224 people in 40,566 households. The 2016 census measured the population of the district as 139,040 inhabitants in 37,243 households.

=== Administrative divisions ===
Central District (Shushtar County) Population
Administrative Divisions	2006	2011	2016
Miyan Ab RD (Note: Transferred to Miyan Ab District and renamed Miyan Ab-e Jonubi Rural District)	10,518	10,352	
Miyan Ab-e Shomali RD (Note: Transferred to Miyan Ab District)	22,341	13,475	
Sardarabad RD	23,930	17,105	9,026
Shahid Modarres RD	10,801	10,596	11,139
Sardaran (city) (Note: Formerly the village of Sardarabad)			5,240
Sharafat (city) (Note: Formerly the village of Shahrak-e Shahid Sharafat)		10,881	11,757
Shushtar (city)	94,124	106,815	101,878
Total	161,714	169,224	139,040
RD = Rural District
