= Shoushtar County =

County in Khuzestan province, Iran

Shushtar County Persian: شهرستان شوشتر
- County
- Location of Shushtar County in Khuzestan province (center, yellow)

- Location of Khuzestan province in Iran
- Coordinates: 31°53′N 48°54′E
- Country: Iran
- Province: Khuzestan
- Capital: Shushtar
- Districts: Central, Miyan Ab, Shoaybiyeh

Population (2016)
  - Total: 192,028
- Time zone: UTC+3:30 (IRST)

Shoushtar County (Persian: شهرستان شوشتر) is in Khuzestan province, Iran. Its capital is the city of Shoushtar.

== History ==
After the 2006 National Census, the village of Guriyeh was elevated to the status of a city. In addition, the village of Shahrak-e Shahid Sharafat rose to city status as Sharafat.

After the 2011 census, Miyan Ab (Note: Renamed Miyan Ab-e Jonubi Rural District) and Miyan Ab-e Shomali Rural Districts were separated from the Central District in the formation of Miyan Ab District, and the village of Sardarabad was elevated to city status as Sardaran.

== Demographics ==
=== Population ===
At the time of the 2006 census, the county's population was 182,282 in 37,656 households. The following census in 2011 counted 191,444 people in 45,360 households. The 2016 census measured the population of the county as 192,028 in 50,878 households.

=== Administrative divisions ===
Shoushtar County's population history and administrative structure over three consecutive censuses are shown in the following table.

Shoushtar County Population
Administrative Divisions	2006	2011	2016
Central District	161,714	169,224	139,040
Miyan Ab RD	10,518	10,352	
Miyan Ab-e Shomali RD	22,341	13,475	
Sardarabad RD	23,930	17,105	9,026
Shahid Modarres RD	10,801	10,596	11,139
Sardaran (city) (Note: Formerly the village of Sardarabad)			5,240
Sharafat (city) (Note: Formerly the village of Shahrak-e Shahid Sharafat)		10,881	11,757
Shoushtar (city)	94,124	106,815	101,878
Miyan Ab District			32,177
Miyan Ab-e Jonubi RD (Note: Formerly Miyan Ab Rural District)			10,517
Miyan Ab-e Shomali RD			21,660
Shoaybiyeh District (Note: Formerly Shadravan District)	20,568	21,780	20,660
Shoaybiyeh-ye Gharbi RD (Note: Formerly Shoaybiyeh Rural District)	13,254	11,253	10,658
Shoaybiyeh-ye Sharqi RD	7,314	7,536	7,112
Guriyeh (city)		2,991	2,890
Total	182,282	191,444	192,028
RD = Rural District

== See also ==
Media related to Shoushtar County at Wikimedia Commons
