= Kalgah =

Kalgah (Persian: كلگه) may refer to various places in Iran:

- Kalgah, Fars, Fars Province
- Kalgah-e Gorosneh, Fars Province
- Kalgah-e Olya, Fars Province
- Kalgah-e Sofla, Fars Province
- Kalgah Shiraz, Fars Province
- Kalgah, Kermanshah
- Kalgah, Khuzestan
- Kalgah, Kohgiluyeh and Boyer-Ahmad
- Kalgah-e Pahn, Kohgiluyeh and Boyer-Ahmad Province

== See also ==
- Kalegah (disambiguation)
- Kalgeh, a village in Rud Zard Rural District, in the Central District of Bagh-e Malek County, Khuzestan Province, Iran
