= Meydavud =

Meydavud or Meidavood or Mey Davuud or Meydavod or Mai Daud (Persian: میداود) may refer to:

- Meydavud District, a district Khuzestan Province, Iran
  - Meydavud Rural District, a sub-district of Meydavud District
    - Meydavud-e Olya, a village in Meydavud Rural District, Iran
    - Meydavud-e Sofla, a village in Meydavud Rural District, Iran
    - Meydavud-e Vosta, a village in Meydavud Rural District, Iran
