= Banar-e Vajel =

Village in Khuzestan province, Iran

Banar-e Vajel Persian: بنارواجل
- Village
- Location within Iran
- Coordinates: 31°25′12″N 50°04′14″E
- Country: Iran
- Province: Khuzestan
- County: Seydun
- District: Central
- Rural District: Vajel

Population (2016)
  - Total: 809
- Time zone: UTC+3:30 (IRST)

Banar-e Vajel (Persian: بنارواجل) (Note: Also romanized as Banār-e Vājel; also known as Vājel) is a village in, and the capital of Vajel Rural District of the Central District (Note: Formerly Seydun District of Bagh-e Malek County) of Seydun County, Khuzestan province, Iran.

== Demographics ==
=== Population ===
At the time of the 2006 National Census, the village's population was 815 in 156 households, when it was in Seydun-e Shomali Rural District (Note: Formerly Seydun Rural District) of Seydun District (Note: Renamed the Central District of Seydun County) in Bagh-e Malek County. The following census in 2011 counted 863 people in 191 households. The 2016 census measured the population of the village as 809 people in 203 households.

In 2022, the district was separated from the county in the establishment of Seydun County and renamed the Central District. Banar-e Vajel was transferred to Vajel Rural District created in the new district.
