= Rudzir =

Village in Khuzestan province, Iran

Rudzir Persian: رودزير
- Village
- Location within Iran
- Coordinates: 31°20′29″N 50°06′25″E
- Country: Iran
- Province: Khuzestan
- County: Seydun
- District: Ala
- Rural District: Rudzir

Population (2016)
  - Total: 890
- Time zone: UTC+3:30 (IRST)

Rudzir (Persian: رودزير) (Note: Also romanized as Rūdzīr) is a village in, and the capital of, Rudzir Rural District of Ala District, Seydun County, Khuzestan province, Iran. It was the capital of Seydun-e Jonubi Rural District until its capital was transferred to the village of Alad.

== Demographics ==
=== Population ===
At the time of the 2006 National Census, the village's population was 1,126 in 210 households, when it was in Seydun-e Jonubi Rural District of Seydun District (Note: Renamed the Central District of Seydun County) in Bagh-e Malek County. The following census in 2011 counted 1,185 people in 221 households. The 2016 census measured the population of the village as 890 people in 205 households.

In 2022, the district was separated from the county in the establishment of Seydun County and renamed the Central District. The rural district was transferred to the new Ala District, and Rudzir was transferred to Rudzir Rural District created in the district.
