= Boneh Lam =

Village in Khuzestan province, Iran

Boneh Lam Persian: بنه لم
- Village
- Location within Iran
- Coordinates: 31°21′16″N 50°06′02″E
- Country: Iran
- Province: Khuzestan
- County: Seydun
- District: Ala
- Rural District: Seydun-e Jonubi

Population (2016)
  - Total: 1,539
- Time zone: UTC+3:30 (IRST)

Boneh Lam (Persian: بنه لم) is a village in Rudzir Rural District of Ala District, Seydun County, Khuzestan province, Iran, serving as capital of the district.

== Demographics ==
=== Population ===
At the time of the 2006 National Census, the village's population was 1,014 in 170 households, when it was in Seydun-e Jonubi Rural District of Seydun District (Note: Renamed the Central District of Seydun County) in Bagh-e Malek County. The following census in 2011 counted 1,530 people in 281 households. The 2016 census measured the population of the village as 1,539 people in 316 households. It was the most populous village in its rural district.

In 2022, the district was separated from the county in the establishment of Seydun County and renamed the Central District. The rural district was transferred to the new Ala District, and Boneh Lam was transferred to Rudzir Rural District created in the district.
