= Mavi =

Mavi may refer to:

== People ==
- Mavi (rapper) (Omavi Minder, born 1999), an American rapper
- Shivam Mavi (born 1998), an Indian cricketer

== Places ==
- Mavi, East Azerbaijan, a village in East Azerbaijan Province, Iran
- Mavi, Razavi Khorasan, a village in Razavi Khorasan Province, Iran
- Mavi, Hamadan, a village in Hamadan Province, Iran
- Mavi-ye Olya, a village in Khuzestan Province, Iran
- Mavi-ye Sofla, a village in Khuzestan Province, Iran
- Shahrak-e Mavi, a village in Khuzestan Province, Iran

== Other uses ==
- Maví or Maybe, a tree bark-based beverage
- Mavi (jeans), a Turkish clothing company ("Mavi" meaning "blue" in Turkish)
- A Jatt clan in the Punjab region of India and Pakistan; see Nayagaon, Punjab
