= Kalleh Gah =

Kalleh Gah or Kallehgah or Kaleh Gah (Persian: كله گه) may refer to:

- Kalleh Gah, East Azerbaijan
- Kalleh Gah, Fars
- Kalleh Gah, Ilam
- Kalleh Gah, Kohgiluyeh and Boyer-Ahmad
