= Kalegah =

Kalegah or Kalegeh (Persian: كالگه) may refer to:

- Kalegah, Ilam
- Kalegah, Kermanshah
- Kalegah-e Zaman, Kermanshah Province

== See also ==
- Kalgah (disambiguation)
- Kalgeh
