= Cheshmeh Gorgi =

Cheshmeh Gorgi چشمه گرگي
- Village
- Location within Iran
- Coordinates: 31°40′55″N 49°49′12″E
- Country: Iran
- Province: Khuzestan
- County: Bagh-e Malek
- Bakhsh: Central
- Rural District: Qaleh Tall

Population (2006)
  - Total: 79
- Time zone: UTC+3:30 (IRST)
  - Summer (DST): UTC+4:30 (IRDT)

Cheshmeh Gorgi (Persian: چشمه گرگي, also Romanized as Cheshmeh Gorgī and Chashmeh Gorgi; also known as Chashmeh Gogird, Chashmeh Gorgīr, and Cheshmeh Gorgīr) is a village in Qaleh Tall Rural District, in the Central District of Bagh-e Malek County, Khuzestan Province, Iran. At the 2006 census, its population was 79, in 14 families.
