= Cham Dalan =

Cham Dalan چم دالان
- Village
- Location within Iran
- Coordinates: 31°19′05″N 49°52′33″E
- Country: Iran
- Province: Khuzestan
- County: Bagh-e Malek
- Bakhsh: Meydavud
- Rural District: Saroleh

Population (2006)
  - Total: 286
- Time zone: UTC+3:30 (IRST)
  - Summer (DST): UTC+4:30 (IRDT)

Cham Dalan (Persian: چم دالان, also Romanized as Cham Dālān; also known as Cham Dālūn) is a village in Saroleh Rural District, Meydavud District, Bagh-e Malek County, Khuzestan Province, Iran. At the 2006 census, its population was 286, in 51 families.
