= Mohammad Kazemi (village) =

Mohammad Kazemi محمدكاظمي
- Village
- Location within Iran
- Coordinates: 31°23′24″N 49°50′16″E
- Country: Iran
- Province: Khuzestan
- County: Bagh-e Malek
- Bakhsh: Meydavud
- Rural District: Meydavud

Population (2006)
  - Total: 381
- Time zone: UTC+3:30 (IRST)
  - Summer (DST): UTC+4:30 (IRDT)

Mohammad Kazemi (Persian: محمدكاظمي, also Romanized as Moḩammad Kāz̧emī; also known as Qaryeh-e Moḩammad Kāz̧emī) is a village in Meydavud Rural District, Meydavud District, Bagh-e Malek County, Khuzestan Province, Iran. At the 2006 census, its population was 381, in 72 families.
