= Keyup =

Keyup كيوپ
- Village
- Location within Iran
- Coordinates: 31°33′43″N 50°01′08″E
- Country: Iran
- Province: Khuzestan
- County: Bagh-e Malek
- Bakhsh: Central
- Rural District: Mongasht

Population (2006)
  - Total: 458
- Time zone: UTC+3:30 (IRST)
  - Summer (DST): UTC+4:30 (IRDT)

Keyup (Persian: كيوپ, also Romanized as Keyūp and Kayūp; also known as Kayūb) is a village in Mongasht Rural District, in the Central District of Bagh-e Malek County, Khuzestan Province, Iran. At the 2006 census, its population was 458, in 82 families.
