= Dimgeh-ye Tang Chavil =

Dimgeh-ye Tang Chavil ديمگه تنگ چويل
- Village
- Country: Iran
- Province: Khuzestan
- County: Bagh-e Malek
- Bakhsh: Seydun
- Rural District: Seydun-e Jonubi

Population (2006)
  - Total: 82
- Time zone: UTC+3:30 (IRST)
  - Summer (DST): UTC+4:30 (IRDT)

Dimgeh-ye Tang Chavil (Persian: ديمگه تنگ چويل, also Romanized as Dīmgeh-ye Tang Chavīl) is a village in Seydun-e Jonubi Rural District, Seydun District, Bagh-e Malek County, Khuzestan Province, Iran. At the 2006 census, its population was 82, in 16 families.
