= Balaghab =

Balaghab بلغاب
- Village
- Location within Iran
- Coordinates: 31°39′03″N 49°57′18″E
- Country: Iran
- Province: Khuzestan
- County: Bagh-e Malek
- Bakhsh: Central
- Rural District: Qaleh Tall

Population (2006)
  - Total: 79
- Time zone: UTC+3:30 (IRST)
  - Summer (DST): UTC+4:30 (IRDT)

Balaghab (Persian: بلغاب, also Romanized as Balaghāb; also known as Balaqāb, Balghab, and Bolaq Āb) is a village in Qaleh Tall Rural District, in the Central District of Bagh-e Malek County, Khuzestan Province, Iran. At the 2006 census, its population was 79, in 22 families.
