= Chel Rubah =

Chel Rubah چل روباه
- Village
- Location within Iran
- Coordinates: 31°16′35″N 49°55′27″E
- Country: Iran
- Province: Khuzestan
- County: Bagh-e Malek
- Bakhsh: Meydavud
- Rural District: Saroleh

Population (2006)
  - Total: 51
- Time zone: UTC+3:30 (IRST)
  - Summer (DST): UTC+4:30 (IRDT)

Chel Rubah (Persian: چل روباه, also Romanized as Chel Rūbāh; also known as Chehelrūbāh) is a village in Saroleh Rural District, Meydavud District, Bagh-e Malek County, Khuzestan Province, Iran. At the 2006 census, its population was 51, in 10 families.
