= Bondurab =

Bondurab بن دوراب
- Village
- Location within Iran
- Coordinates: 31°18′28″N 50°12′55″E
- Country: Iran
- Province: Khuzestan
- County: Bagh-e Malek
- Bakhsh: Seydun
- Rural District: Seydun-e Jonubi

Population (2006)
  - Total: 214
- Time zone: UTC+3:30 (IRST)
  - Summer (DST): UTC+4:30 (IRDT)

Bondurab (Persian: بن دوراب, also Romanized as Bondūrāb) is a village in Seydun-e Jonubi Rural District, Seydun District, Bagh-e Malek County, Khuzestan Province, Iran. At the 2006 census, its population was 214, in 35 families.
