= Godarpahan =

Godarpahan and Godar Pahn (Persian: گدارپهن) may refer to:

- Godar Pahn, Bagh-e Malek
- Godar Pahn, Hamadan
- Godar Pahn, Ramhormoz
- Godarpahan, Lorestan
