= Alad, Seydun =

Village in Khuzestan province, Iran

Alad Persian: اعلاڈ
- Village
- Location within Iran
- Coordinates: 31°19′47″N 50°06′14″E
- Country: Iran
- Province: Khuzestan
- County: Seydun
- District: Ala
- Rural District: Seydun-e Jonubi

Population (2016)
  - Total: 631
- Time zone: UTC+3:30 (IRST)

Alad (Persian: اعلاڈ) (Note: Also romanized as Āʿlāɖ; also known as A‘lā) is a village in, and the capital of, Seydun-e Jonubi Rural District of Ala District, Seydun County, Khuzestan province, Iran. The previous capital of the rural district was the village of Rudzir.

== Demographics ==
=== Population ===
At the time of the 2006 National Census, the village's population was 735 in 143 households, when it was in Seydun District (Note: Renamed the Central District of Seydun County) of Bagh-e Malek County. The following census in 2011 counted 764 people in 160 households. The 2016 census measured the population of the village as 631 people in 150 households.

In 2022, the district was separated from the county in the establishment of Seydun County and renamed the Central District. The rural district was transferred to the new Ala District.
