= Bali Khalk =

Bali Khalk Persian: بلي خلك
- Village
- Interactive map of Bali Khalk
- Coordinates: 31.3226°N 50.1410°E
- Country: Iran
- Province: Khuzestan
- County: Bagh-e Malek
- Bakhsh: Seydun
- Rural District: Seydun-e Jonubi

Population (2006)
  - Total: 47
- Time zone: UTC+3:30 (IRST)
  - Summer (DST): UTC+4:30 (IRDT)

Bali Khalk (Persian: بلي خلك, also romanize as Balī Khalḵ) is a village in Seydun-e Jonubi Rural District, Seydun District, Bagh-e Malek County, Khuzestan Province, Iran. At the 2006 census, its population was 47, in 8 families.
