= Kadim, Iran =

Kadim كديم
- Village
- Location within Iran
- Coordinates: 31°22′18″N 50°06′15″E
- Country: Iran
- Province: Khuzestan
- County: Bagh-e Malek
- Bakhsh: Seydun
- Rural District: Seydun-e Shomali

Population (2006)
  - Total: 32
- Time zone: UTC+3:30 (IRST)
  - Summer (DST): UTC+4:30 (IRDT)

Kadim (Persian: كديم, also Romanized as Kadīm) is a village in Seydun-e Shomali Rural District, Seydun District, Bagh-e Malek County, Khuzestan Province, Iran. At the 2006 census, its population was 32, in 6 families.
