= Galleh Vari =

Galleh Vari گله واري
- Village
- Location within Iran
- Coordinates: 31°38′59″N 49°48′32″E
- Country: Iran
- Province: Khuzestan
- County: Bagh-e Malek
- Bakhsh: Central
- Rural District: Qaleh Tall

Population (2006)
  - Total: 127
- Time zone: UTC+3:30 (IRST)
  - Summer (DST): UTC+4:30 (IRDT)

Galleh Vari (Persian: گله واري, also Romanized as Galleh Vārī; also known as Qal‘eh Vārī and Qalleh Vārī) is a village in Qaleh Tall Rural District, in the Central District of Bagh-e Malek County, Khuzestan Province, Iran. At the 2006 census, its population was 127, in 29 families.
