= Darreh Tu-ye Olya =

Darreh Tu-ye Olya دره توعليا
- Village
- Location within Iran
- Coordinates: 31°10′00″N 49°55′46″E
- Country: Iran
- Province: Khuzestan
- County: Bagh-e Malek
- Bakhsh: Seydun
- Rural District: Seydun-e Shomali

Population (2006)
  - Total: 235
- Time zone: UTC+3:30 (IRST)
  - Summer (DST): UTC+4:30 (IRDT)

Darreh Tu-ye Olya (Persian: دره توعليا, also Romanized as Darreh Tū-ye 'Olyā; also known as Darreh Tū) is a village in Seydun-e Shomali Rural District, Seydun District, Bagh-e Malek County, Khuzestan province, Iran. At the 2006 census, its population was 235, in 46 families.
