= Kalleh Pir =

Kalleh Pir كله پير
- Village
- Location within Iran
- Coordinates: 31°25′25″N 50°00′03″E
- Country: Iran
- Province: Khuzestan
- County: Bagh-e Malek
- Bakhsh: Central
- Rural District: Haparu

Population (2006)
  - Total: 88
- Time zone: UTC+3:30 (IRST)
  - Summer (DST): UTC+4:30 (IRDT)

Kalleh Pir (Persian: كله پير, also Romanized as Kalleh Pīr and Kaleh-ye Pīr; also known as Gal-e Pīr and Qal‘eh Pir) is a village in Haparu Rural District, in the Central District of Bagh-e Malek County, Khuzestan Province, Iran. The country's 2006 census reported a population of 88 people.
