= Duparun =

Duparun دوپرون
- Village
- Location within Iran
- Coordinates: 31°22′23″N 50°03′05″E
- Country: Iran
- Province: Khuzestan
- County: Bagh-e Malek
- Bakhsh: Seydun
- Rural District: Seydun-e Shomali

Population (2006)
  - Total: 188
- Time zone: UTC+3:30 (IRST)
  - Summer (DST): UTC+4:30 (IRDT)

Duparun (Persian: دوپرون, also Romanized as Dūparūn; also known as Dowparan) is a village in Seydun-e Shomali Rural District, Seydun District, Bagh-e Malek County, Khuzestan Province, Iran. At the 2006 census, its population was 188, in 31 families.
