= Darreh-ye Rizi =

Darreh-ye Rizi دره ريزي
- Village
- Interactive map of Darreh-ye Rizi
- Country: Iran
- Province: Khuzestan
- County: Bagh-e Malek
- Bakhsh: Seydun
- Rural District: Seydun-e Shomali

Population (2006)
  - Total: 160
- Time zone: UTC+3:30 (IRST)
  - Summer (DST): UTC+4:30 (IRDT)

Darreh-ye Rizi (Persian: دره ريزي, also Romanized as Darreh-ye Rīzī) is a village in Seydun-e Shomali Rural District, Seydun District, Bagh-e Malek County, Khuzestan Province, Iran. At the 2006 census, its population was 160, in 32 families.
