= Barangerd =

Village in Khuzestan province, Iran

Barangerd Persian: بارانگرد
- Village
- Location within Iran
- Coordinates: 31°42′39″N 49°49′58″E
- Country: Iran
- Province: Khuzestan
- County: Bagh-e Malek
- District: Qaleh Tall
- Rural District: Barangerd

Population (2016)
  - Total: 1,349
- Time zone: UTC+3:30 (IRST)

Barangerd (Persian: بارانگرد) (Note: Also romanized as Bārāngerd) is a village in, and the capital of, Barangerd Rural District of Qaleh Tall District, Bagh-e Malek County, Khuzestan province, Iran.

== Demographics ==
=== Population ===
At the time of the 2006 National Census, the village's population was 1,474 in 316 households, when it was in Qaleh Tall Rural District of the Central District. The following census in 2011 counted 1,521 people in 338 households. The 2016 census measured the population of the village as 1,349 people in 365 households. It was the most populous village in its rural district.

In 2023, the rural district was separated from the district in the formation of Qaleh Tall District, and Barangerd was transferred to Barangerd Rural District created in the new district.
