= Banar Kabutaran =

Banar Kabutaran بناركبوتران
- Village
- Location within Iran
- Coordinates: 31°21′04″N 50°00′56″E
- Country: Iran
- Province: Khuzestan
- County: Bagh-e Malek
- Bakhsh: Seydun
- Rural District: Seydun-e Shomali

Population (2006)
  - Total: 36
- Time zone: UTC+3:30 (IRST)
  - Summer (DST): UTC+4:30 (IRDT)

Banar Kabutaran (Persian: بناركبوتران, also Romanized as Banār Kabūtarān; also known as Banār Kamūtarān) is a village in Seydun-e Shomali Rural District, Seydun District, Bagh-e Malek County, Khuzestan Province, Iran. At the 2006 census, its population was 36, in 5 families.
