= Estil =

Estil اسطل
- Village
- Location within Iran
- Coordinates: 31°37′09″N 49°49′25″E
- Country: Iran
- Province: Khuzestan
- County: Bagh-e Malek
- Bakhsh: Central
- Rural District: Qaleh Tall

Population (2006)
  - Total: 120
- Time zone: UTC+3:30 (IRST)
  - Summer (DST): UTC+4:30 (IRDT)

Estil (Persian: اسطل, also Romanized as Estīl; also known as Darreh Estīl and Darreh-ye Estīl) is a village in Qaleh Tall Rural District, in the Central District of Bagh-e Malek County, Khuzestan Province, Iran. At the 2006 census, its population was 120, in 23 families.
