= Pas Kul =

Pas Kul پسكول
- Village
- Location within Iran
- Coordinates: 31°17′32″N 50°05′26″E
- Country: Iran
- Province: Khuzestan
- County: Bagh-e Malek
- Bakhsh: Seydun
- Rural District: Seydun-e Jonubi

Population (2006)
  - Total: 28
- Time zone: UTC+3:30 (IRST)
  - Summer (DST): UTC+4:30 (IRDT)

Pas Kul (Persian: پسكول, also Romanized as Pas Kūl) is a village in Seydun-e Jonubi Rural District, Seydun District, Bagh-e Malek County, Khuzestan Province, Iran. At the 2006 census, its population was 28, in 4 families.
