= Sar Durab =

Sar Durab سردوراب
- Village
- Location within Iran
- Coordinates: 31°19′47″N 50°13′16″E
- Country: Iran
- Province: Khuzestan
- County: Bagh-e Malek
- Bakhsh: Seydun
- Rural District: Seydun-e Jonubi

Population (2006)
  - Total: 359
- Time zone: UTC+3:30 (IRST)
  - Summer (DST): UTC+4:30 (IRDT)

Sar Durab (Persian: سردوراب, also Romanized as Sar Dūrāb) is a village in Seydun-e Jonubi Rural District, Seydun District, Bagh-e Malek County, Khuzestan Province, Iran. At the 2006 census, its population was 359, in 68 families.
