= Cholchelak =

Cholchelak چلچلك
- Village
- Location within Iran
- Coordinates: 31°33′00″N 49°54′00″E
- Country: Iran
- Province: Khuzestan
- County: Bagh-e Malek
- Bakhsh: Central
- Rural District: Mongasht

Population (2006)
  - Total: 1,451
- Time zone: UTC+3:30 (IRST)
  - Summer (DST): UTC+4:30 (IRDT)

Cholchelak (Persian: چلچلك) is a village in Mongasht Rural District, in the Central District of Bagh-e Malek County, Khuzestan Province, Iran. At the 2006 census, its population was 1,451, in 278 families.
