= Darreh Dazi =

Darreh Dazi دره دزي
- Village
- Location within Iran
- Coordinates: 31°28′31″N 49°59′23″E
- Country: Iran
- Province: Khuzestan
- County: Bagh-e Malek
- Bakhsh: Central
- Rural District: Haparu

Population (2006)
  - Total: 22
- Time zone: UTC+3:30 (IRST)
  - Summer (DST): UTC+4:30 (IRDT)

Darreh Dazi (Persian: دره دزي, also Romanized as Darreh Dazī; also known as Darrehdowzu) is a village in Haparu Rural District, in the Central District of Bagh-e Malek County, Khuzestan Province, Iran. At the 2006 census, its population was 22, in 4 families.
