= Barm Shahzadeh Abdollah =

Barm Shahzadeh Abdollah برم شاهزاده عبداله
- Village
- Location within Iran
- Coordinates: 31°24′07″N 50°09′24″E
- Country: Iran
- Province: Khuzestan
- County: Bagh-e Malek
- Bakhsh: Seydun
- Rural District: Seydun-e Shomali

Population (2006)
  - Total: 169
- Time zone: UTC+3:30 (IRST)
  - Summer (DST): UTC+4:30 (IRDT)

Barm Shahzadeh Abdollah (Persian: برم شاهزاده عبداله, also Romanized as Barm Shāhzādeh ‘Abdollāh) is a village in Seydun-e Shomali Rural District, Seydun District, Bagh-e Malek County, Khuzestan Province, Iran. At the 2006 census, its population was 169, in 29 families.
