= Pas Kareh =

Pas Kareh پسكره
- Village
- Location within Iran
- Coordinates: 31°24′58″N 49°59′27″E
- Country: Iran
- Province: Khuzestan
- County: Bagh-e Malek
- Bakhsh: Central
- Rural District: Haparu

Population (2006)
  - Total: 701
- Time zone: UTC+3:30 (IRST)
  - Summer (DST): UTC+4:30 (IRDT)

Pas Kareh (Persian: پسكره) is a village in Haparu Rural District, in the Central District of Bagh-e Malek County, Khuzestan Province, Iran. At the 2006 census, its population was 701, in 140 families.
