= Darreh-ye Talkh =

Darreh-ye Talkh دره تلخ
- Village
- Location within Iran
- Coordinates: 31°26′03″N 50°04′36″E
- Country: Iran
- Province: Khuzestan
- County: Bagh-e Malek
- Bakhsh: Seydun
- Rural District: Seydun-e Shomali

Population (2006)
  - Total: 196
- Time zone: UTC+3:30 (IRST)
  - Summer (DST): UTC+4:30 (IRDT)

Darreh-ye Talkh (Persian: دره تلخ) is a village in Seydun-e Shomali Rural District, Seydun District, Bagh-e Malek County, Khuzestan Province, Iran. As of the 2006 census, its population was 196 with there being 38 families.
