= Chahar Darreh =

Chahar Darreh چهاردره
- Village
- Location within Iran
- Coordinates: 31°18′41″N 49°54′43″E
- Country: Iran
- Province: Khuzestan
- County: Bagh-e Malek
- Bakhsh: Meydavud
- Rural District: Saroleh

Population (2006)
  - Total: 114
- Time zone: UTC+3:30 (IRST)
  - Summer (DST): UTC+4:30 (IRDT)

Chahar Darreh (Persian: چهاردره, also Romanized as Chahār Darreh; also known as Chahār Darreh-ye Bālā) is a village in Saroleh Rural District, Meydavud District, Bagh-e Malek County, Khuzestan Province, Iran. At the 2006 census, its population was 114, in 22 families.
