= Loran, Iran =

Village in Khuzestan province, Iran

Loran Persian: لران
- Village
- Location within Iran
- Coordinates: 31°34′23″N 49°51′53″E
- Country: Iran
- Province: Khuzestan
- County: Bagh-e Malek
- District: Qaleh Tall
- Rural District: Qaleh Tall

Population (2016)
  - Total: 507
- Time zone: UTC+3:30 (IRST)

Loran (Persian: لران) (Note: Also romanized as Lorān) is a village in, and the capital of, Qaleh Tall Rural District of Qaleh Tall District, Bagh-e Malek County, Khuzestan province, Iran. The rural district was previously administered from the city of Qaleh Tall.

== Demographics ==
=== Population ===
At the time of the 2006 National Census, the village's population was 601 in 114 households, when it was in the Central District. The following census in 2011 counted 531 people in 131 households. The 2016 census measured the population of the village as 507 people in 124 households.

In 2023, the rural district was separated from the district in the formation of Qaleh Tall District.
