= Chit Anbeh =

Chit Anbeh چي تمبه
- Village
- Location within Iran
- Coordinates: 31°22′07″N 49°48′30″E
- Country: Iran
- Province: Khuzestan
- County: Bagh-e Malek
- Bakhsh: Meydavud
- Rural District: Meydavud

Population (2006)
  - Total: 1,189
- Time zone: UTC+3:30 (IRST)
  - Summer (DST): UTC+4:30 (IRDT)

Chit Anbeh (Persian: چي تمبه, also Romanized as Chīt Anbeh; also known as Chitamba, Chītambū, Chīt Anbūh, and Chīt Boneh) is a village in Meydavud Rural District, Meydavud District, Bagh-e Malek County, Khuzestan Province, Iran. At the 2006 census, its population was 1,189, in 253 families.

Chitanbeh is famous for its rice, known as champa. The main families in this riverside village are Kolahkaj, Davoodi, Asghari, Abdali, Choromi, and Mosavi, along with some new families who arrived in 2009.
