= Talavar =

Talavar (Persian: طلاور) may refer to:

- Talavar 1
- Talavar 2
- Talavar 3
