= Shahzadeh Abdollah =

Shahzadeh Abdollah شاهزاده عبداله
- Village
- Location within Iran
- Coordinates: 31°24′07″N 50°09′40″E
- Country: Iran
- Province: Khuzestan
- County: Bagh-e Malek
- Bakhsh: Seydun
- Rural District: Seydun-e Shomali

Population (2006)
  - Total: 48
- Time zone: UTC+3:30 (IRST)
  - Summer (DST): UTC+4:30 (IRDT)

Shahzadeh Abdollah (Persian: شاهزاده عبداله, also Romanized as Shāhzādeh ‘Abdollāh) is a village in Seydun-e Shomali Rural District, Seydun District, Bagh-e Malek County, Khuzestan Province, Iran. At the 2006 census, its population was 48, in 9 families.
