= Bugari =

Bugari بوگري
- Village
- Location within Iran
- Coordinates: 31°37′19″N 49°53′44″E
- Country: Iran
- Province: Khuzestan
- County: Bagh-e Malek
- Bakhsh: Central
- Rural District: Qaleh Tall

Population (2006)
  - Total: 375
- Time zone: UTC+3:30 (IRST)
  - Summer (DST): UTC+4:30 (IRDT)

Bugari (Persian: بوگري, also Romanized as Būgarī) is a village in Qaleh Tall Rural District, in the Central District of Bagh-e Malek County, Khuzestan Province, Iran. At the 2006 census, its population was 375, in 63 families.
