= Pa Derazan =

Pa Derazan پادرازان
- Village
- Location within Iran
- Coordinates: 31°34′22″N 49°51′27″E
- Country: Iran
- Province: Khuzestan
- County: Bagh-e Malek
- Bakhsh: Central
- Rural District: Qaleh Tall

Population (2006)
  - Total: 55
- Time zone: UTC+3:30 (IRST)
  - Summer (DST): UTC+4:30 (IRDT)

Pa Derazan (Persian: پادرازان, also Romanized as Pā Derāzān) is a village in Qaleh Tall Rural District, in the Central District of Bagh-e Malek County, Khuzestan Province, Iran. At the 2006 census, its population was 55, in 12 families.
