= Sarhani =

Sarhani سرحاني
- Village
- Location within Iran
- Coordinates: 31°22′29″N 49°58′37″E
- Country: Iran
- Province: Khuzestan
- County: Bagh-e Malek
- Bakhsh: Meydavud
- Rural District: Meydavud

Population (2006)
  - Total: 1,134
- Time zone: UTC+3:30 (IRST)
  - Summer (DST): UTC+4:30 (IRDT)

Sarhani (Persian: سرحاني, also Romanized as Sarḩānī; also known as Sarjānī and Sarkhānī) is a village in Meydavud Rural District, Meydavud District, Bagh-e Malek County, Khuzestan Province, Iran. At the 2006 census, its population was 1,134, in 234 families.
