= Darreh Zard, Khuzestan =

Darreh Zard دره زرد
- Village
- Location within Iran
- Coordinates: 31°19′16″N 50°06′29″E
- Country: Iran
- Province: Khuzestan
- County: Bagh-e Malek
- Bakhsh: Seydun
- Rural District: Seydun-e Jonubi

Population (2006)
  - Total: 401
- Time zone: UTC+3:30 (IRST)
  - Summer (DST): UTC+4:30 (IRDT)

Darreh Zard (Persian: دره زرد) is a village in Seydun-e Jonubi Rural District, Seydun District, Bagh-e Malek County, Khuzestan Province, Iran. At the 2006 census, its population was 401, in 66 families.
