= Darreh Bonyab =

Darreh Bonyab دره بنياب
- Village
- Location within Iran
- Coordinates: 31°19′48″N 50°05′01″E
- Country: Iran
- Province: Khuzestan
- County: Bagh-e Malek
- Bakhsh: Seydun
- Rural District: Seydun-e Jonubi

Population (2006)
  - Total: 1,075
- Time zone: UTC+3:30 (IRST)
  - Summer (DST): UTC+4:30 (IRDT)

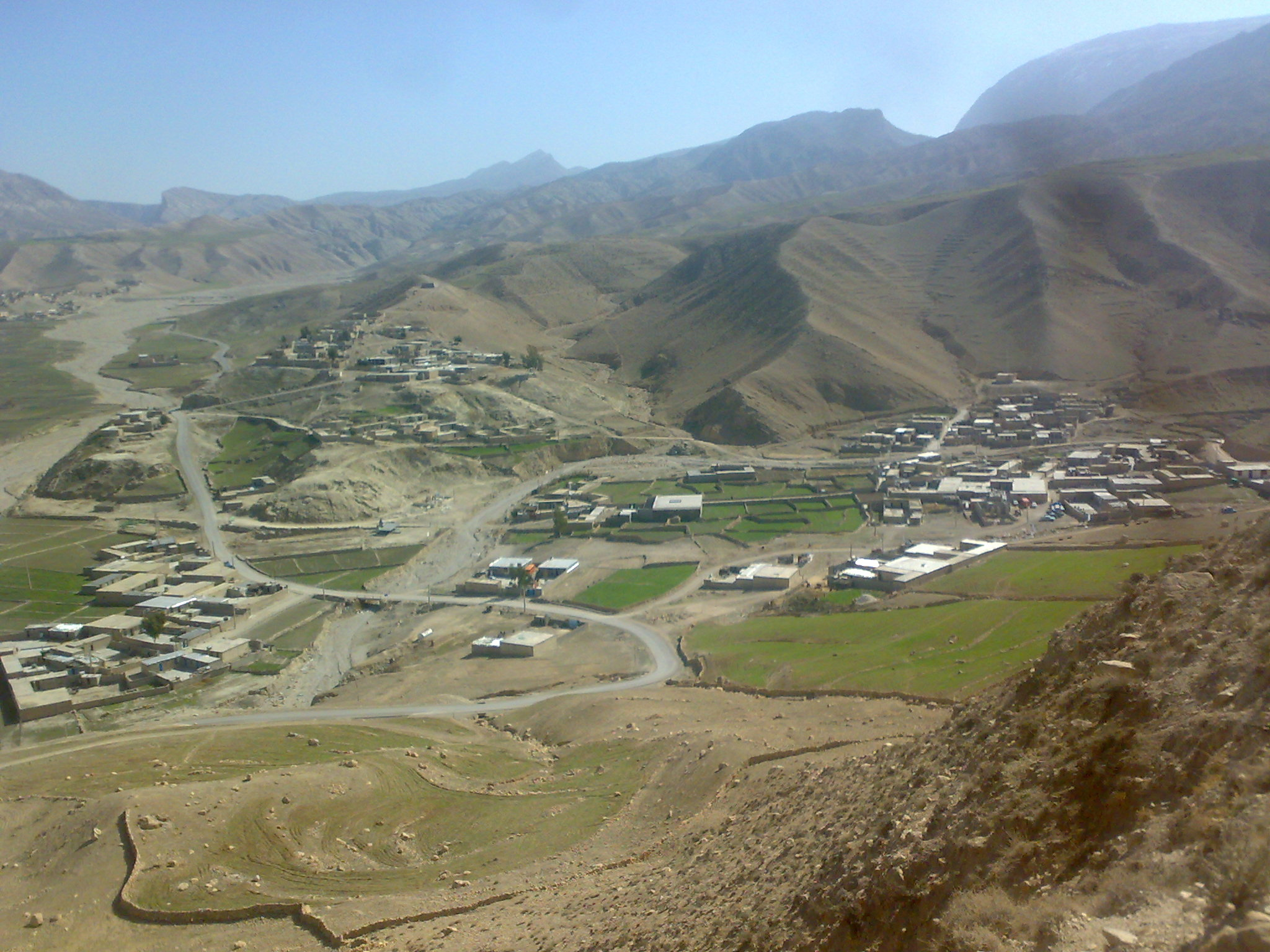
Darreh Bonyab

Darreh Bonyab (Persian: دره بنياب, also Romanized as Darreh Bonyāb and Darreh Bonīāb; also known as Darreh-ye Banī) is a village in Seydun-e Jonubi Rural District, Seydun District, Bagh-e Malek County, Khuzestan Province, Iran. At the 2006 census, its population was 1,075, in 199 families.
