= Darreh-ye Na =

Darreh-ye Na دره نا
- Village
- Location within Iran
- Coordinates: 31°09′43″N 49°58′44″E
- Country: Iran
- Province: Khuzestan
- County: Bagh-e Malek
- Bakhsh: Meydavud
- Rural District: Saroleh

Population (2006)
  - Total: ~40
- Time zone: UTC+3:30 (IRST)
  - Summer (DST): UTC+4:30 (IRDT)

Darreh-ye Na (Persian: دره نا, also Romanized as Darreh-ye Nā; also known as Darehnā) is a village in Saroleh Rural District, Meydavud District, Bagh-e Malek County, Khuzestan Province, Iran. At the 2006 census, its population was 38, in 11 families.
