= Sar Darreh, Khuzestan =

Village in Khuzestan province, Iran

Sar Darreh Persian: سردره
- Village
- Location within Iran
- Coordinates: 31°24′14″N 50°04′23″E
- Country: Iran
- Province: Khuzestan
- County: Seydun
- District: Central
- Rural District: Seydun-e Shomali

Population (2016)
  - Total: 868
- Time zone: UTC+3:30 (IRST)

Sar Darreh (Persian: سردره) (Note: Also known as Sar Dar) is a village in Seydun-e Shomali Rural District (Note: Formerly Seydun Rural District) of the Central District (Note: Formerly Seydun District of Bagh-e Malek County) of Seydun County, Khuzestan province, Iran.

== Demographics ==
=== Population ===
At the time of the 2006 National Census, the village's population was 962 in 181 households, when it was in Seydun District (Note: Renamed the Central District of Seydun County) of Bagh-e Malek County. The following census in 2011 counted 957 people in 199 households. The 2016 census measured the population of the village as 868 people in 201 households. It was the most populous village in its rural district.

In 2022, the district was separated from the county in the establishment of Seydun County and renamed the Central District.
