= Mil Pay Mil =

Mil Pay Mil ميل پاي ميل
- Village
- Location within Iran
- Coordinates: 31°20′11″N 50°14′21″E
- Country: Iran
- Province: Khuzestan
- County: Bagh-e Malek
- Bakhsh: Seydun
- Rural District: Seydun-e Jonubi

Population (2006)
  - Total: 142
- Time zone: UTC+3:30 (IRST)
  - Summer (DST): UTC+4:30 (IRDT)

Mil Pay Mil (Persian: ميل پاي ميل, also Romanized as Mīl Pāy Mīl; also known as Pā-ye Mīl) is a village in Seydun-e Jonubi Rural District, Seydun District, Bagh-e Malek County, Khuzestan Province, Iran. At the 2006 census, its population was 142, in 25 families.
