= Patuf =

Patuf پاطوف
- Village
- Location within Iran
- Coordinates: 31°18′40″N 50°07′44″E
- Country: Iran
- Province: Khuzestan
- County: Bagh-e Malek
- Bakhsh: Seydun
- Rural District: Seydun-e Jonubi

Population (2006)
  - Total: 216
- Time zone: UTC+3:30 (IRST)
  - Summer (DST): UTC+4:30 (IRDT)

Patuf (Persian: پاطوف, also Romanized as Pāţūf) is a village in Seydun-e Jonubi Rural District, Seydun District, Bagh-e Malek County, Khuzestan Province, Iran. At the 2006 census, its population was 216, in 38 families.
