= Chamban =

Chamban چم بن
- Village
- Location within Iran
- Coordinates: 31°18′10″N 49°55′10″E
- Country: Iran
- Province: Khuzestan
- County: Bagh-e Malek
- Bakhsh: Meydavud
- Rural District: Saroleh

Population (2006)
  - Total: 89
- Time zone: UTC+3:30 (IRST)
  - Summer (DST): UTC+4:30 (IRDT)

Chamban (Persian: چم بن, also Romanized as Chambān and Cham Bon) is a village in Saroleh Rural District, Meydavud District, Bagh-e Malek County, Khuzestan Province, Iran. At the 2006 census, its population was 89, in 17 families.
