= Melleh-ye Gurab =

Melleh-ye Gurab مله گوراب
- Village
- Location within Iran
- Coordinates: 31°30′18″N 49°59′23″E
- Country: Iran
- Province: Khuzestan
- County: Bagh-e Malek
- Bakhsh: Central
- Rural District: Mongasht

Population (2006)
  - Total: 63
- Time zone: UTC+3:30 (IRST)
  - Summer (DST): UTC+4:30 (IRDT)

Melleh-ye Gurab (Persian: مله گوراب, also Romanized as Melleh-ye Gūrāb and Meleh-ye Gūrāb) is a village in Mongasht Rural District, in the Central District of Bagh-e Malek County, Khuzestan Province, Iran. At the 2006 census, its population was 63, in 11 families.
