= Cham Seyyed Mohammad =

Cham Seyyed Mohammad چم سيدمحمد
- Village
- Location within Iran
- Coordinates: 31°18′42″N 49°50′48″E
- Country: Iran
- Province: Khuzestan
- County: Bagh-e Malek
- Bakhsh: Meydavud
- Rural District: Saroleh

Population (2006)
  - Total: 269
- Time zone: UTC+3:30 (IRST)
  - Summer (DST): UTC+4:30 (IRDT)

Cham Seyyed Mohammad (Persian: چم سيدمحمد, also Romanized as Cham Seyyed Moḩammad, Chame-e Seyyed Moḩammad, and Cham-e Seyyed Moḩammad) is a village in Saroleh Rural District, Meydavud District, Bagh-e Malek County, Khuzestan Province, Iran. At the 2006 census, its population was 269, in 54 families.
