= Chagha Sorkhak =

Chagha Sorkhak چغاسرخك
- Village
- Location within Iran
- Coordinates: 31°27′11″N 50°00′11″E
- Country: Iran
- Province: Khuzestan
- County: Bagh-e Malek
- Bakhsh: Central
- Rural District: Haparu

Population (2006)
  - Total: 419
- Time zone: UTC+3:30 (IRST)
  - Summer (DST): UTC+4:30 (IRDT)

Chagha Sorkhak (Persian: چغاسرخك, also Romanized as Chaghā Sorkhak; also known as Chaghā Sorkheh) is a village in Haparu Rural District, in the Central District of Bagh-e Malek County, Khuzestan Province, Iran. At the 2006 census, its population was 419, in 67 families.
