= Bahreh =

Bahreh (Persian: بهره or بحره) may refer to:

- Bahreh, Bagh-e Malek, Khuzestan Province (بهره)
- Bahreh-ye Ruzeh, Khuzestan Province
- Bahreh, Razavi Khorasan (بهره)
