= Dam Aftab =

Dam Aftab دم افتاب
- Village
- Location within Iran
- Coordinates: 31°28′20″N 49°56′26″E
- Country: Iran
- Province: Khuzestan
- County: Bagh-e Malek
- Bakhsh: Central
- Rural District: Haparu

Population (2006)
  - Total: 238
- Time zone: UTC+3:30 (IRST)
  - Summer (DST): UTC+4:30 (IRDT)

Dam Aftab (Persian: دم افتاب, also Romanized as Dam Āftāb; also known as Dam Āftāb-e Manganān) is a village in Haparu Rural District, in the Central District of Bagh-e Malek County, Khuzestan Province, Iran. At the 2006 census, its population was 238, in 41 families.
