= Kulor =

Kulor كولر
- Village
- Location within Iran
- Coordinates: 31°26′05″N 50°01′09″E
- Country: Iran
- Province: Khuzestan
- County: Bagh-e Malek
- Bakhsh: Central
- Rural District: Haparu

Population (2006)
  - Total: 201
- Time zone: UTC+3:30 (IRST)
  - Summer (DST): UTC+4:30 (IRDT)

Kulor (Persian: كولر, also Romanized as Kūlor) is a village in Haparu Rural District, in the Central District of Bagh-e Malek County, Khuzestan Province, Iran. At the 2006 census, its population was 201, in 37 families.
