= Kalleh Sir =

Kalleh Sir كله سير
- Village
- Country: Iran
- Province: Khuzestan
- County: Bagh-e Malek
- Bakhsh: Meydavud
- Rural District: Saroleh

Population (2006)
  - Total: 257
- Time zone: UTC+3:30 (IRST)
  - Summer (DST): UTC+4:30 (IRDT)

Kalleh Sir (Persian: كله سير, also Romanized as Kalleh Sīr) is a village in Saroleh Rural District, Meydavud District, Bagh-e Malek County, Khuzestan Province, Iran. At the 2006 census, its population was 257, in 48 families.
