= Menareh Barangerd =

Menareh Barangerd مناره بارانگرد
- Village
- Location within Iran
- Coordinates: 31°42′55″N 49°50′56″E
- Country: Iran
- Province: Khuzestan
- County: Bagh-e Malek
- Bakhsh: Central
- Rural District: Qaleh Tall

Population (2006)
  - Total: 173
- Time zone: UTC+3:30 (IRST)
  - Summer (DST): UTC+4:30 (IRDT)

Menareh Barangerd (Persian: مناره بارانگرد, also Romanized as Menāreh Bārāngerd; also known as Menāreh) is a village in Qaleh Tall Rural District, in the Central District of Bagh-e Malek County, Khuzestan Province, Iran. At the 2006 census, its population was 173, in 33 families.
