= Tall Shur =

Tall Shur تل شور
- Village
- Location within Iran
- Coordinates: 31°21′42″N 49°50′40″E
- Country: Iran
- Province: Khuzestan
- County: Bagh-e Malek
- Bakhsh: Meydavud
- Rural District: Saroleh

Population (2006)
  - Total: 1,229
- Time zone: UTC+3:30 (IRST)
  - Summer (DST): UTC+4:30 (IRDT)

Tall Shur (Persian: تل شور, also Romanized as Tall Shūr; also known as Tall Sūreh) is a village in Saroleh Rural District, Meydavud District, Bagh-e Malek County, Khuzestan Province, Iran. At the 2006 census, its population was 1,229, in 250 families.
