= Savali, Iran =

Savali سوالي
- Village
- Location within Iran
- Coordinates: 31°21′57″N 50°00′35″E
- Country: Iran
- Province: Khuzestan
- County: Bagh-e Malek
- Bakhsh: Seydun
- Rural District: Seydun-e Shomali

Population (2006)
  - Total: 341
- Time zone: UTC+3:30 (IRST)
  - Summer (DST): UTC+4:30 (IRDT)

Savali (Persian: سوالي, also Romanized as Savālī and Savūlī; also known as Sayālī) is a village in Seydun-e Shomali Rural District, Seydun District, Bagh-e Malek County, Khuzestan Province, Iran. At the 2006 census, its population was 341, in 60 families.
