= Dameshgaft =

Dameshgaft دم اشگفت
- Village
- Location within Iran
- Coordinates: 31°29′00″N 49°55′00″E
- Country: Iran
- Province: Khuzestan
- County: Bagh-e Malek
- Bakhsh: Central
- Rural District: Haparu

Population (2006)
  - Total: 353
- Time zone: UTC+3:30 (IRST)
  - Summer (DST): UTC+4:30 (IRDT)

Dameshgaft (Persian: دم اشگفت; also known as Dameshgaft-e Mangenān) is a village in Haparu Rural District, in the Central District of Bagh-e Malek County, Khuzestan Province, Iran. At the 2006 census, its population was 353, in 53 families.
