= Boneh Karuk =

Boneh Karuk بنه كروك
- Village
- Location within Iran
- Coordinates: 31°19′35″N 50°04′32″E
- Country: Iran
- Province: Khuzestan
- County: Bagh-e Malek
- Bakhsh: Seydun
- Rural District: Seydun-e Jonubi

Population (2006)
  - Total: 23
- Time zone: UTC+3:30 (IRST)
  - Summer (DST): UTC+4:30 (IRDT)

Boneh Karuk (Persian: بنه كروك, also Romanized as Boneh Karūḵ; also known as Boneh Kark) is a village in Seydun-e Jonubi Rural District, Seydun District, Bagh-e Malek County, Khuzestan Province, Iran. At the 2006 census, its population was 23, in 5 families.
