= Barangerd Rural District =

Rural district in Khuzestan province, Iran

Barangerd Rural District Persian: دهستان بارانگرد
- Rural District
- Location within Iran
- Coordinates: 31°39′19″N 49°50′00″E
- Country: Iran
- Province: Khuzestan
- County: Bagh-e Malek
- District: Qaleh Tall
- Capital: Barangerd
- Time zone: UTC+3:30 (IRST)

Barangerd Rural District (Persian: دهستان بارانگرد) is in Qaleh Tall District of Bagh-e Malek County, Khuzestan province, Iran. Its capital is the village of Barangerd, whose population at the time of the 2016 National Census was 1,349 in 365 households.

== History ==
In 2023, Qaleh Tall Rural District and the city of Qaleh Tall were separated from the Central District in the establishment of Qaleh Tall District, and Barangerd Rural District was created in the new district.
