= Karbalai Qasemali =

Karbalai Qasemali كربلايي قاسم علي
- Village
- Location within Iran
- Coordinates: 31°27′31″N 49°57′55″E
- Country: Iran
- Province: Khuzestan
- County: Bagh-e Malek
- Bakhsh: Central
- Rural District: Haparu

Population (2006)
  - Total: 309
- Time zone: UTC+3:30 (IRST)
  - Summer (DST): UTC+4:30 (IRDT)

Karbalai Qasemali (Persian: كربلايي قاسم علي, also Romanized as Karbalā’ī Qāsem‘alī) is a village in Haparu Rural District, in the Central District of Bagh-e Malek County, Khuzestan Province, Iran. At the 2006 census, its population was 309, in 59 families.
