= Darreh Anar =

Darreh Anar دره انار
- Village
- Location within Iran
- Coordinates: 31°27′27″N 49°54′29″E
- Country: Iran
- Province: Khuzestan
- County: Bagh-e Malek
- Bakhsh: Central
- Rural District: Haparu

Population (2006)
  - Total: 316
- Time zone: UTC+3:30 (IRST)
  - Summer (DST): UTC+4:30 (IRDT)

Darreh Anar (Persian: دره انار, also Romanized as Darreh Anār) is a village in Haparu Rural District, in the Central District of Bagh-e Malek County, Khuzestan Province, Iran. At the 2006 census, its population was 316, in 55 families.
