= Ab Gandu =

Ab Gandu اب گندو
- Village
- Location within Iran
- Coordinates: 31°27′15″N 49°57′20″E
- Country: Iran
- Province: Khuzestan
- County: Bagh-e Malek
- Bakhsh: Central
- Rural District: Haparu

Population (2006)
  - Total: 391
- Time zone: UTC+3:30 (IRST)
  - Summer (DST): UTC+4:30 (IRDT)

Ab Gandu (Persian: اب گندو, also Romanized as Āb Gandū, Ab Gandoo, and Āb Gandow) is a village in Haparu Rural District, in the Central District of Bagh-e Malek County, Khuzestan Province, Iran. At the 2006 census, its population was 391, in 69 families.
