= Chidan =

Chidan چيدن
- Village
- Location within Iran
- Coordinates: 31°32′44″N 50°00′22″E
- Country: Iran
- Province: Khuzestan
- County: Bagh-e Malek
- Bakhsh: Central
- Rural District: Mongasht

Population (2006)
  - Total: 1,490
- Time zone: UTC+3:30 (IRST)
  - Summer (DST): UTC+4:30 (IRDT)

Chidan (Persian: چيدن, also Romanized as Chīdan and Chīden) is a village in Mongasht Rural District, in the Central District of Bagh-e Malek County, Khuzestan Province, Iran. At the 2006 census, its population was 1,490, in 247 families.
