= Mal Aqa =

Mal Aqa مال اقا
- Village
- Location within Iran
- Coordinates: 31°35′41″N 50°01′36″E
- Country: Iran
- Province: Khuzestan
- County: Bagh-e Malek
- Bakhsh: Central
- Rural District: Qaleh Tall

Population (2006)
  - Total: 128
- Time zone: UTC+3:30 (IRST)
  - Summer (DST): UTC+4:30 (IRDT)

Mal Aqa (Persian: مال اقا, also Romanized as Māl Āqā; also known as Mālāgha) is a village in Qaleh Tall Rural District, in the Central District of Bagh-e Malek County, Khuzestan Province, Iran. At the 2006 census, its population was 128, in 31 families.
