= Lalab, Iran =

Lalab لالب
- Village
- Location within Iran
- Coordinates: 31°33′03″N 49°57′31″E
- Country: Iran
- Province: Khuzestan
- County: Bagh-e Malek
- Bakhsh: Central
- Rural District: Mongasht

Population (2006)
  - Total: 1,183
- Time zone: UTC+3:30 (IRST)
  - Summer (DST): UTC+4:30 (IRDT)

Lalab (Persian: لالب, also Romanizeed as Lālab and Lālob) is a village in Mongasht Rural District, in the Central District of Bagh-e Malek County, Khuzestan Province, Iran. At the 2006 census, its population was 1,183, in 217 families.
