= Kaltandar-e Sofla =

Kaltandar-e Sofla كلتندرسفلي
- Village
- Location within Iran
- Coordinates: 31°34′32″N 49°50′00″E
- Country: Iran
- Province: Khuzestan
- County: Bagh-e Malek
- Bakhsh: Central
- Rural District: Qaleh Tall

Population (2006)
  - Total: 249
- Time zone: UTC+3:30 (IRST)
  - Summer (DST): UTC+4:30 (IRDT)

Kaltandar-e Sofla (Persian: كلتندرسفلي, also Romanized as Kaltandar-e Soflá, Kaltondar-e Soflá, and Kaltondar Soflá; also known as Kaltondar-e Pā’īn) is a village in Qaleh Tall Rural District, in the Central District of Bagh-e Malek County, Khuzestan Province, Iran. At the 2006 census, its population was 249, in 62 families.
