= Shahrak-e Mavi =

Shahrak-e Mavi شهرك ماوئ
- Village
- Interactive map of Shahrak-e Mavi
- Country: Iran
- Province: Khuzestan
- County: Bagh-e Malek
- Bakhsh: Seydun
- Rural District: Seydun-e Jonubi

Population (2006)
  - Total: 270
- Time zone: UTC+3:30 (IRST)
  - Summer (DST): UTC+4:30 (IRDT)

Shahrak-e Mavi (Persian: شهرك ماوئ, also Romanized as Shahrak-e Māvi) is a village in Seydun-e Jonubi Rural District, Seydun District, Bagh-e Malek County, Khuzestan Province, Iran. At the 2006 census, its population was 270, in 44 families.
