= Darb-e Abu ol Abbas =

Darb-e Abu ol Abbas دربابوالعباس
- Village
- Location within Iran
- Coordinates: 31°32′08″N 49°56′39″E
- Country: Iran
- Province: Khuzestan
- County: Bagh-e Malek
- Bakhsh: Central
- Rural District: Mongasht

Population (2006)
  - Total: 422
- Time zone: UTC+3:30 (IRST)
  - Summer (DST): UTC+4:30 (IRDT)

Darb-e Abu ol Abbas (Persian: دربابوالعباس, also Romanized as Darb-e Abū ol 'Abbās; also known as Darb) is a village in Mongasht Rural District, in the Central District of Bagh-e Malek County, Khuzestan province, Iran. At the 2006 census, its population was 422, in 74 families.
