= Bahareh, Seydun =

Bahareh بهاره
- Village
- Location within Iran
- Coordinates: 31°19′12″N 50°15′28″E
- Country: Iran
- Province: Khuzestan
- County: Bagh-e Malek
- Bakhsh: Seydun
- Rural District: Seydun-e Jonubi

Population (2006)
  - Total: 91
- Time zone: UTC+3:30 (IRST)
  - Summer (DST): UTC+4:30 (IRDT)

Bahareh (Persian: بهاره, also Romanized as Bahāreh) is a village in Seydun-e Jonubi Rural District, Seydun District, Bagh-e Malek County, Khuzestan Province, Iran. At the 2006 census, its population was 91, in 13 families.
