= Bahreh, Bagh-e Malek =

Bahreh بهره
- Village
- Location within Iran
- Coordinates: 31°13′38″N 50°00′56″E
- Country: Iran
- Province: Khuzestan
- County: Bagh-e Malek
- Bakhsh: Meydavud
- Rural District: Saroleh

Population (2006)
  - Total: 72
- Time zone: UTC+3:30 (IRST)
  - Summer (DST): UTC+4:30 (IRDT)

Bahreh (Persian: بهره) is a village in Saroleh Rural District, Meydavud District, Bagh-e Malek County, Khuzestan Province, Iran. At the 2006 census, its population was 72, in 18 families.
