= Tighen =

Tighen (Persian: تيغن) may refer to:

- Tighen-e Olya
- Tighen-e Sofla
