= Dowruhan =

Dowruhan or Duruhan (Persian: دروهان) may refer to:

- Dowruhan, Khuzestan
- Duruhan, Kohgiluyeh and Boyer-Ahmad
