= Abu ol Abbas =

Village in Khuzestan province, Iran

Abu ol Abbas Persian: ابوالعباس
- Village
- Location within Iran
- Coordinates: 31°32′49″N 49°57′53″E
- Country: Iran
- Province: Khuzestan
- County: Bagh-e Malek
- District: Central
- Rural District: Mongasht

Population (2016)
  - Total: 1,690
- Time zone: UTC+3:30 (IRST)

Abu ol Abbas (Persian: ابوالعباس) (Note: Also romanized as Abū ol ‘Abbās; also known as Ab-ol-Abbās, Bolāvās, Bulāwās, Mangasht, Mongasht, and Mongast) is a village in, and the capital of, Mongasht Rural District of the Central District of Bagh-e Malek County, Khuzestan province, Iran.

== Demographics ==
=== Population ===
At the time of the 2006 National Census, the village's population was 1,998 in 428 households. The following census in 2011 counted 1,978 people in 487 households. The 2016 census measured the population of the village as 1,690 people in 443 households. It was the most populous village in its rural district.
