= Darb =

Darb may refer to:

== Places ==
- Darb, Armenia
- Darb, Andika, Iran
- Darb, Bagh-e Malek, Iran
- Darb, Izeh, Iran
- Darb-e Bagh, Iran
- Darb-e Juqa, Iran
- Al Darb (Arabic: الدرب), Jizan Region, Saudi Arabia; a governorate

== Other uses ==
- Darb., botanical abbreviation for British botanist Otto Vernon Darbishire (1870–1934)
- Darb (sword), a Thai/Lao single-edge sword / martial arts weapon
