= Durtu =

Village in Khuzestan province, Iran

Durtu Persian: دورتو
- Village
- Location within Iran
- Coordinates: 31°25′23″N 49°59′44″E
- Country: Iran
- Province: Khuzestan
- County: Bagh-e Malek
- District: Central
- Rural District: Haparu

Population (2016)
  - Total: 328
- Time zone: UTC+3:30 (IRST)

Durtu (Persian: دورتو) (Note: Also romanized as Dūrtū) is a village in, and the capital of, Haparu Rural District of the Central District of Bagh-e Malek County, Khuzestan province, Iran.

== Demographics ==
=== Population ===
At the time of the 2006 National Census, the village's population was 472 in 86 households. The following census in 2011 counted 369 people in 86 households. The 2016 census measured the population of the village as 328 people in 83 households.
