= Do Rahi-ye Eslamabad =

Village in Khuzestan province, Iran

Do Rahi-ye Eslamabad Persian: دوراهي اسلام اباد
- Village
- Location within Iran
- Coordinates: 31°28′08″N 49°54′37″E
- Country: Iran
- Province: Khuzestan
- County: Bagh-e Malek
- District: Central
- Rural District: Haparu

Population (2016)
  - Total: 1,099
- Time zone: UTC+3:30 (IRST)

Do Rahi-ye Eslamabad (Persian: دوراهي اسلام اباد) (Note: Also romanized as Do Rāhī-ye Eslāmābād) is a village in Haparu Rural District of the Central District of Bagh-e Malek County, Khuzestan province, Iran.

== Demographics ==
=== Population ===
At the time of the 2006 National Census, the village's population was 997 in 177 households. The following census in 2011 counted 1,096 people in 229 households. The 2016 census measured the population of the village as 1,099 people in 242 households. It was the most populous village in its rural district.
