= Talavar-e Do =

Talavar-e Do طلاوردو
- Village
- Location within Iran
- Coordinates: 31°21′02″N 50°03′02″E
- Country: Iran
- Province: Khuzestan
- County: Bagh-e Malek
- Bakhsh: Seydun
- Rural District: Seydun-e Shomali

Population (2006)
  - Total: 423
- Time zone: UTC+3:30 (IRST)
  - Summer (DST): UTC+4:30 (IRDT)

Talavar-e Do (Persian: طلاوردو, also Romanized as Talāvar-e Do; also known as Talāvar and Ţalāvar-e Soflá) is a village in Seydun-e Shomali Rural District, Seydun District, Bagh-e Malek County, Khuzestan Province, Iran. At the 2006 census, its population was 423, in 72 families.
