= Golabundan =

Golabundan (Persian: گلابوندان) may refer to:

- Golabundan-e Olya
- Golabundan-e Sofla
