= Meydavud-e Olya =

Meydavud-e Olya ميداودعليا
- Village
- Location within Iran
- Coordinates: 31°23′21″N 49°51′17″E
- Country: Iran
- Province: Khuzestan
- County: Bagh-e Malek
- Bakhsh: Meydavud
- Rural District: Meydavud

Population (2006)
  - Total: 152
- Time zone: UTC+3:30 (IRST)
  - Summer (DST): UTC+4:30 (IRDT)

Meydavud-e Olya (Persian: ميداودعليا, also Romanized as Meydāvūd-e ‘Olyā, Meydāvūd ‘Olyā, Meidavood Olya, and Meydāvod-e ‘Olyā; also known as Mai Dāud, Mai Dāūd Bāla, Meydāvūd, Meydāvūd Bālā, Meydāvūd-e Bālā, and Mey Dāvuūd-e Bālā) is a village in Meydavud Rural District, Meydavud District, Bagh-e Malek County, Khuzestan Province, Iran. At the 2006 census, its population was 152, in 38 families.
