= Mavi-ye Olya =

Mavi-ye Olya ماوي عليا
- Village
- Location within Iran
- Coordinates: 31°18′51″N 50°09′08″E
- Country: Iran
- Province: Khuzestan
- County: Bagh-e Malek
- Bakhsh: Seydun
- Rural District: Seydun-e Jonubi

Population (2006)
  - Total: 191
- Time zone: UTC+3:30 (IRST)
  - Summer (DST): UTC+4:30 (IRDT)

Mavi-ye Olya (Persian: ماوي عليا, also Romanized as Māvī-ye ‘Olyā; also known as Māvī and Māvī-ye Bālā) is a village in Seydun-e Jonubi Rural District, Seydun District, Bagh-e Malek County, Khuzestan Province, Iran. At the 2006 census, its population was 191, in 40 families.
