= Tighen-e Sofla =

Tighen-e Sofla تيغن سفلي
- Village
- Location within Iran
- Coordinates: 31°22′44″N 49°51′20″E
- Country: Iran
- Province: Khuzestan
- County: Bagh-e Malek
- Bakhsh: Meydavud
- Rural District: Meydavud

Population (2006)
  - Total: 308
- Time zone: UTC+3:30 (IRST)
  - Summer (DST): UTC+4:30 (IRDT)

Tighen-e Sofla (Persian: تيغن سفلي, also Romanized as Tīghen-e Soflá) is a village in Meydavud Rural District, Meydavud District, Bagh-e Malek County, Khuzestan Province, Iran. At the 2006 census, its population was 308, in 71 families.
