= Dalan, Khuzestan =

Village in Khuzestan province, Iran

Dalan Persian: دالان
- Village
- Location within Iran
- Coordinates: 31°19′19″N 49°53′00″E
- Country: Iran
- Province: Khuzestan
- County: Bagh-e Malek
- District: Meydavud
- Rural District: Saroleh

Population (2016)
  - Total: 756
- Time zone: UTC+3:30 (IRST)

Dalan (Persian: دالان) (Note: Also romanized as Dālān; also known as Dālūn) is a village in, and the capital of, Saroleh Rural District of Meydavud District, Bagh-e Malek County, Khuzestan province, Iran.

== Demographics ==
=== Population ===
At the time of the 2006 National Census, the village's population was 717 in 148 households. The following census in 2011 counted 839 people in 188 households. The 2016 census measured the population of the village as 756 people in 182 households.
