= Vareh (disambiguation) =

Vareh is a village in Qaemabad Rural District, Shahriar County, Tehran Province, Iran.

Vareh may also refer to:

- Vareh Zard, a village in Malavi Rural District, Pol-e Dokhtar County, Lorestan Province, Iran
- Vareh Now, a village in Balghelu Rural District, Ardabil County, Ardabil Province, Iran
- Vareh-ye Mohammad Jafari, a village in Seydun-e Jonubi Rural District, Bagh-e Malek County, Khuzestan Province, Iran
- Vareh Zardi, Khorramabad
- Vareh Zardi, Pol-e Dokhtar
