= Golabundan-e Sofla =

Golabundan-e Sofla گلابوندان سفلي
- Village
- Location within Iran
- Coordinates: 31°32′43″N 49°51′22″E
- Country: Iran
- Province: Khuzestan
- County: Bagh-e Malek
- Bakhsh: Central
- Rural District: Qaleh Tall

Population (2006)
  - Total: 169
- Time zone: UTC+3:30 (IRST)
  - Summer (DST): UTC+4:30 (IRDT)

Golabundan-e Sofla (Persian: گلابوندان سفلي, also Romanized as Golābūndān-e Soflá; also known as Golāvandān-e Soflá) is a village in Qaleh Tall Rural District, in the Central District of Bagh-e Malek County, Khuzestan Province, Iran. At the 2006 census, its population was 169, in 26 families.
