= Bakhtegan =

Bakhtegan بختگان
- Village
- Location within Iran
- Coordinates: 31°32′30″N 49°56′32″E
- Country: Iran
- Province: Khuzestan
- County: Bagh-e Malek
- Bakhsh: Central
- Rural District: Mongasht

Population (2006)
  - Total: 1,107
- Time zone: UTC+3:30 (IRST)
  - Summer (DST): UTC+4:30 (IRDT)

Bakhtegan (Persian: بختگان, also Romanized as Bakhtegān; also known as Bakhtegān-e ‘Olyā) is a village in Mongasht Rural District, in the Central District of Bagh-e Malek County, Khuzestan province, Iran. At the 2006 census, its population was 1,107, in 185 families.
