= Mavi-ye Sofla =

Mavi-ye Sofla ماوي سفلي
- Village
- Location within Iran
- Coordinates: 31°19′18″N 50°08′02″E
- Country: Iran
- Province: Khuzestan
- County: Bagh-e Malek
- Bakhsh: Seydun
- Rural District: Seydun-e Jonubi

Population (2006)
  - Total: 53
- Time zone: UTC+3:30 (IRST)
  - Summer (DST): UTC+4:30 (IRDT)

Mavi-ye Sofla (Persian: ماوي سفلي, also Romanized as Māvī-ye Soflá; also known as Māvī-ye Pā’īn) is a village in Seydun-e Jonubi Rural District, Seydun District, Bagh-e Malek County, Khuzestan Province, Iran. At the 2006 census, its population was 53, in 11 families.
