= Tighen-e Olya =

Tighen-e Olya تيغن عليا
- Village
- Location within Iran
- Coordinates: 31°23′01″N 49°52′28″E
- Country: Iran
- Province: Khuzestan
- County: Bagh-e Malek
- Bakhsh: Meydavud
- Rural District: Meydavud

Population (2006)
  - Total: 563
- Time zone: UTC+3:30 (IRST)
  - Summer (DST): UTC+4:30 (IRDT)

Tighen-e Olya (Persian: تيغن عليا, also Romanized as Tīghen-e ‘Olyā) is a village in Meydavud Rural District, Meydavud District, Bagh-e Malek County, Khuzestan Province, Iran. At the 2006 census, its population was 563, in 110 families.
