= Kalgah Chavil =

Kalgah Chavil كلگه چويل
- Village
- Location within Iran
- Coordinates: 31°20′21″N 50°11′15″E
- Country: Iran
- Province: Khuzestan
- County: Bagh-e Malek
- Bakhsh: Seydun
- Rural District: Seydun-e Jonubi

Population (2006)
  - Total: 126
- Time zone: UTC+3:30 (IRST)
  - Summer (DST): UTC+4:30 (IRDT)

Kalgah Chavil (Persian: كلگه چويل, also Romanized as Kalgah Chavīl; also known as Kalgah) is a village in Seydun-e Jonubi Rural District, Seydun District, Bagh-e Malek County, Khuzestan Province, Iran. At the 2006 census, its population was 126, in 22 families.
