= Bahareh =

Bahareh (Persian: بهاره) is an Iranian feminine given name meaning "Someone or something that arises in the spring season".

Bahareh may also refer to several places in Iran:

- Bahareh, Fars
- Bahareh, Hamadan
- Bahareh, Meydavud, Khuzestan Province
- Bahareh, Seydun, Khuzestan Province
