= Tang-e Palangi =

Tang-e Palangi (Persian: تنگ پلنگي) may refer to:

- Tang-e Palangi, Bagh-e Malek
- Tang-e Palangi, Izeh
