= Mian Kal, Khuzestan =

Mian Kal ميانكل
- Village
- Location within Iran
- Coordinates: 31°23′04″N 49°50′21″E
- Country: Iran
- Province: Khuzestan
- County: Bagh-e Malek
- Bakhsh: Meydavud
- Rural District: Meydavud

Population (2006)
  - Total: 154
- Time zone: UTC+3:30 (IRST)
  - Summer (DST): UTC+4:30 (IRDT)

Mian Kal (Persian: ميانكل, also Romanized as Mīān Kal, Meyān Kal, and Miyan Kal; also known as Mīān Gol) is a village in Meydavud Rural District, Meydavud District, Bagh-e Malek County, Khuzestan Province, Iran. At the 2006 census, its population was 154, in 31 families.
