= Talavar-e Yek =

Village in Khuzestan province, Iran

Talavar-e Yek Persian: طلاوريك
- Village
- Location within Iran
- Coordinates: 31°21′28″N 50°02′42″E
- Country: Iran
- Province: Khuzestan
- County: Seydun
- District: Central
- Rural District: Seydun-e Shomali

Population (2016)
  - Total: 391
- Time zone: UTC+3:30 (IRST)

Talavar-e Yek (Persian: طلاوريك) (Note: Also romanized as Talāvar-e Yek; also known as Talāvar) is a village in, and the capital of, Seydun-e Shomali Rural District (Note: Formerly Seydun Rural District) of the Central District (Note: Formerly Seydun District of Bagh-e Malek County) of Seydun County, Khuzestan province, Iran. The rural district was previously administered from the city of Seydun.

== Demographics ==
=== Population ===
At the time of the 2006 National Census, the village's population was 995 in 176 households, when it was in Seydun District (Note: Renamed the Central District of Seydun County) of Bagh-e Malek County. The following census in 2011 counted 934 people in 210 households. The 2016 census measured the population of the village as 391 people in 110 households.

In 2022, the district was separated from the county in the establishment of Seydun County and renamed the Central District.
