= Putu, Iran =

Putu پوتو
- Village
- Location within Iran
- Coordinates: 31°17′11″N 49°58′49″E
- Country: Iran
- Province: Khuzestan
- County: Bagh-e Malek
- Bakhsh: Meydavud
- Rural District: Saroleh

Population (2006)
  - Total: 392
- Time zone: UTC+3:30 (IRST)
  - Summer (DST): UTC+4:30 (IRDT)

Putu (Persian: پوتو, also Romanized as Pūtū) is a village in Saroleh Rural District, Meydavud District, Bagh-e Malek County, Khuzestan Province, Iran. At the 2006 census, its population was 392, in 76 families.
