= Tang-e Palangi, Bagh-e Malek =

Tang-e Palangi تنگ پلنگي
- Village
- Location within Iran
- Coordinates: 31°29′45″N 49°54′26″E
- Country: Iran
- Province: Khuzestan
- County: Bagh-e Malek
- Bakhsh: Central
- Rural District: Haparu

Population (2006)
  - Total: 270
- Time zone: UTC+3:30 (IRST)
  - Summer (DST): UTC+4:30 (IRDT)

Tang-e Palangi (Persian: تنگ پلنگي, also Romanized as Tang-e Palangī) is a village in Haparu Rural District, in the Central District of Bagh-e Malek County, Khuzestan Province, Iran. At the 2006 census, its population was 270, in 51 families.
