= Talavar-e Seh =

Talavar-e Seh طلاورسه
- Village
- Location within Iran
- Coordinates: 31°21′23″N 50°02′57″E
- Country: Iran
- Province: Khuzestan
- County: Bagh-e Malek
- Bakhsh: Seydun
- Rural District: Seydun-e Shomali

Population (2006)
  - Total: 501
- Time zone: UTC+3:30 (IRST)
  - Summer (DST): UTC+4:30 (IRDT)

Talavar-e Seh (Persian: طلاورسه, also Romanized as Talāvar-e Seh; also known as Talāvar and Ţalāvar-e ‘Olyā) is a village in Seydun-e Shomali Rural District, Seydun District, Bagh-e Malek County, Khuzestan Province, Iran. At the 2006 census, its population was 501, in 83 families.
