= Kaltandar =

Kaltandar or Kaltondar (Persian: كلتندر) may refer to:

- Kaltandar-e Olya
- Kaltandar-e Sofla
