= Parviz Kardavani =

Iranian geographer (1932–2021)

- پرویز کردوانی
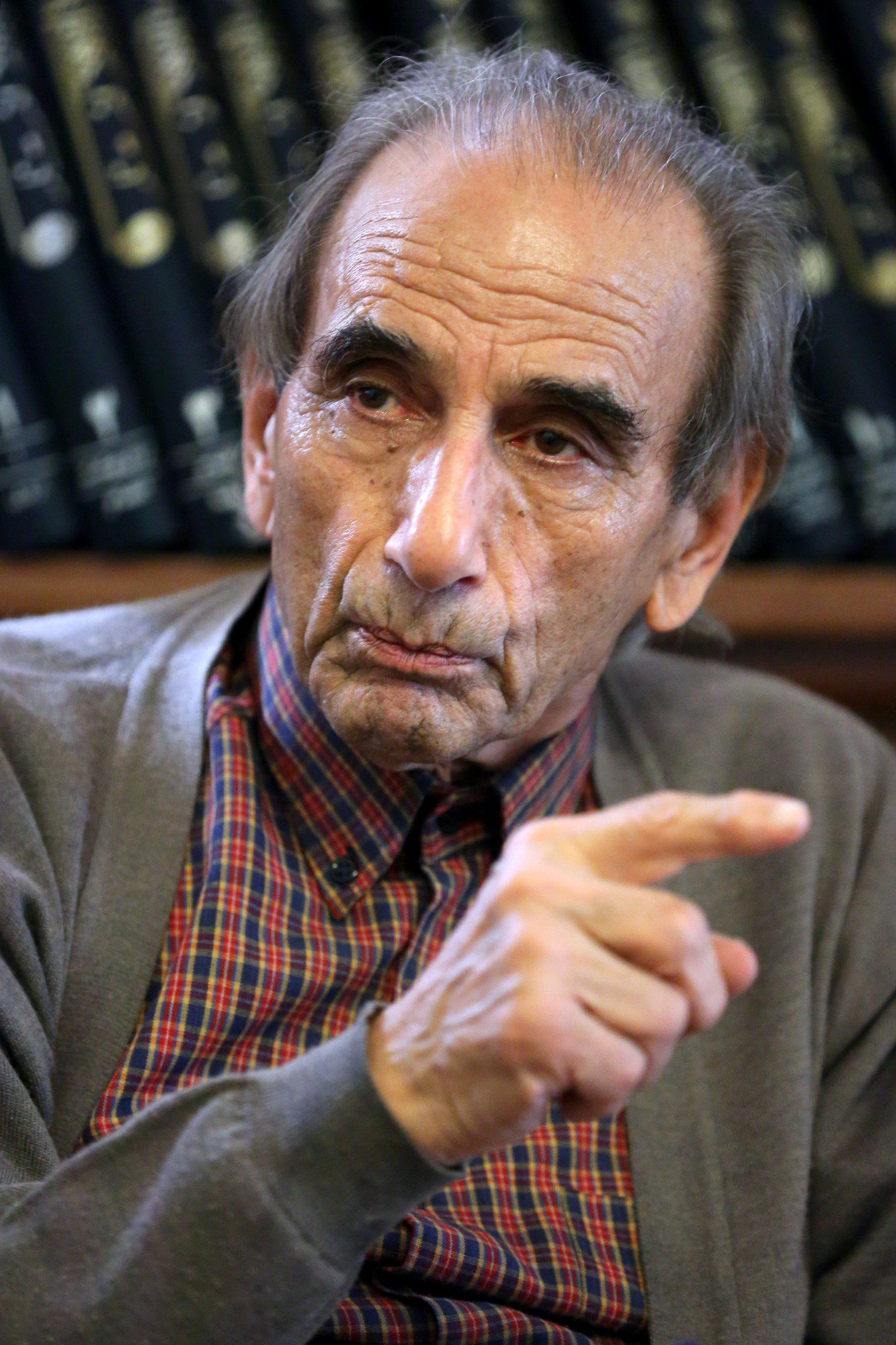
- Born: 1 March 1932; Garmsar, Iran
- Died: 18 August 2021 (aged 89); Tehran, Iran
- Occupation: geographer
- Known for: father of desertification in Iran

Parviz Kardavani (1 March 1932, Garmsar – 18 August 2021, Tehran) was an Iranian geographer, the father of desertification in Iran and a recipient of the Order of Knowledge and a member of the Iranian Science and Culture Hall of Fame.he was introduced as an enduring figure in the field of geography at the Fifth Conference ofEnduring Figures (2005).

== Life ==
=== Education ===
Parviz Kardavani completed his primary education at darab reikan elementary school and his secondary education up to the ninth grade at aftab high school in garmsar. He received his diploma from Tehran's Razi high school (French School). After completing his secondary education, Kardavani went to Germany to continue his studies and completed his doctorate in desert development. For his doctoral research, Kardavani transported approximately one ton of soil samples from the Garmsar Desert to Germany for analysis.

After returning to Iran in 1966, he was hired as the first faculty member of the newly established Urmia Faculty of Agriculture. After two years of study at the faculty, he transferred to the Department of Geography at the University of Tehran in 1968, and it was during these years that he pursued his field studies of the desert regions of Iran with great seriousness.

=== Expert opinion ===
Parviz Kardavani had repeatedly warned about water shortages and incorrect water policies in Iran, saying that within 50 years, Iran would have no surface or groundwater.

He believed that the construction of oil wells and the drying up of wetlands, swamps, and lakes such as Tashk and Bakhtegan were among the factors causing internal dust storms. Kardavani believed that the solution to prevent dust storms was to mix a mixture of water (50%), clay (35%), and sand (15%), which could be used to produce sand-sand concrete and sprinkle it in sand and gravel pits.

Parviz Kardavani considered the transfer of Caspian Sea water to Semnan Province a political controversy. He believed that the plans to transfer water from the Caspian Sea to Semnan and the project to transfer water from the Persian Gulf and the Sea of Oman to South Khorasan and Razavi would not solve the problem of water shortage in the country.

== Works ==
He has written more than 20 books and dozens of scientific articles in Persian, English and German and has given many lectures in domestic and foreign scientific forums.kardavani's research and publications include the following books:

- The Great Central Iranian Desert (Salt) and its Adjacent Areas
- Geography of Soils
- Soil Conservation
- Natural Ecosystems
- Aquatic Ecosystems
- Saline Waters
- Surface and Groundwater
- Geohydrology
- Arid Regions: Climatic Characteristics, Causes of Drought, Water Issues, etc.
- Drought and Ways to Combat It in Iran

== Death ==
Parviz Kardavani died on August 18, 2021 in Tehran.
