= Meydavud-e Vosta =

Village in Khuzestan province, Iran

Meydavud-e Vosta Persian: ميداود وسطي
- Village
- Location within Iran
- Coordinates: 31°23′14″N 49°50′58″E
- Country: Iran
- Province: Khuzestan
- County: Bagh-e Malek
- District: Meydavud
- Rural District: Meydavud

Population (2016)
  - Total: 798
- Time zone: UTC+3:30 (IRST)

Meydavud-e Vosta (Persian: ميداودوسطي) (Note: Also romanized as Meydāvūd-e Vosţá) is a village in Meydavud Rural District of Meydavud District, Bagh-e Malek County, Khuzestan province, Iran.

== Demographics ==
=== Population ===
At the time of the 2006 National Census, the village's population was 1,284 in 270 households. The following census in 2011 counted 972 people in 233 households. The 2016 census measured the population of the village as 798 people in 192 households. It was the most populous village in its rural district.
