= Alad =

Alad may refer to the following places:

- Alad, Seydun, a village in Iran
- Alad, an island barangay in Romblon, Romblon, Philippines
- ALAD, a human gene that encodes the enzyme delta-aminolevulinic acid dehydratase
