= Mian Kal =

Mian Kal or Meyan Kal or Miyan Kal or Mian Kol (Persian: ميانكل) may refer to:

- Mian Kol, Gilan
- Mian Kal, Khuzestan
