= Godar Pahn, Bagh-e Malek =

Village in Khuzestan Province, Iran

Godar Pahn Persian: گدارپهن
- Village
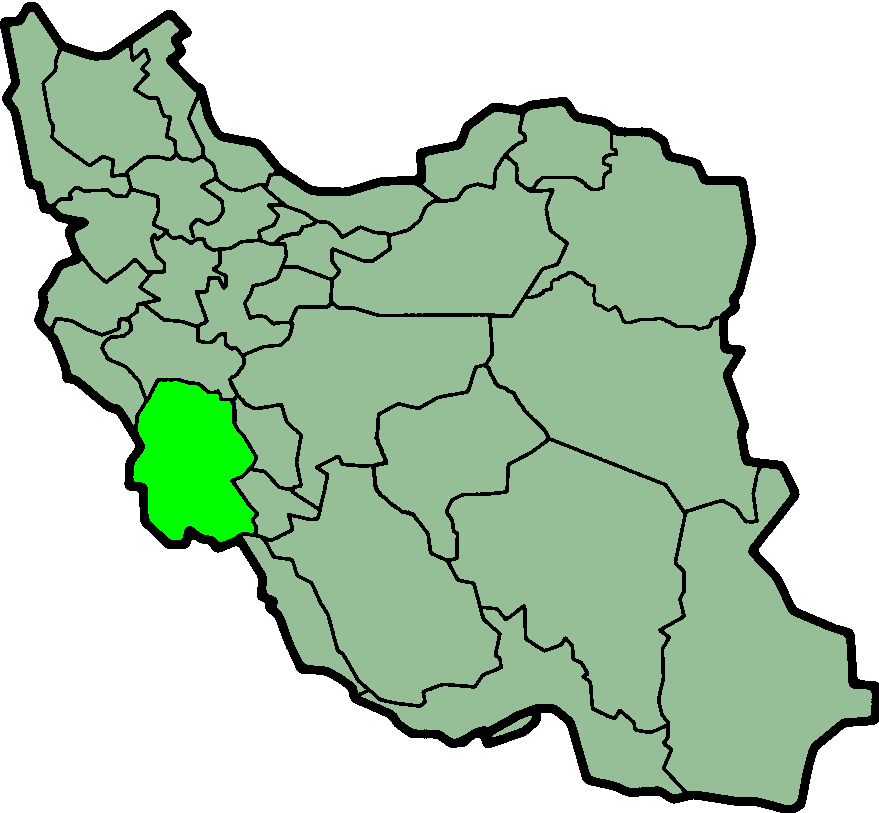
- Location of Khuzestan in Iran

- Location within Iran
- Coordinates: 31°21′35″N 49°50′18″E
- Country: Iran
- Province: Khuzestan
- County: Bagh-e Malek
- District: Meydavud
- Rural District: Saroleh

Population (2016)
  - Total: 1,278
- Time zone: UTC+3:30 (IRST)

Godar Pahn (Persian: گدارپهن) is a village in Saroleh Rural District of Meydavud District, Bagh-e Malek County, Khuzestan province, Iran.

== Demographics ==
=== Population ===
At the time of the 2016 National Census, the village's population was 1,278 people in 313 households. It was the most populous village in its rural district.
