= Vareh Zardi =

Vareh Zardi (Persian: وره زردي) may refer to:

- Vareh Zardi, Khorramabad
- Vareh Zardi, Pol-e Dokhtar
