= Putu =

Putu may refer to:

== Food ==
- Piutu or putu, a cassava dish from the Sama-Bajau of the Philippines and Sabah, Malaysia
- Puto, steamed rice cakes from the Philippines
- Putu bambu, a rice cake steamed in bamboo from Indonesia
- Putu mayam, a sweet rice dish from southern India
- Puttu, Indian rice cake with coconut filling

== Other ==
- Putu, Estonia, a village in Mustvee Parish, Jõgeva County
- Putu, Iran, a village
- Putu Sukreta Suranta, a Hindu religious figure in Indonesia
- Putu Wijaya (born 1944), Indonesian author
