= Vajel Rural District =

Rural district in Khuzestan province, Iran

Vajel Rural District Persian: دهستان واجل
- Rural District
- Location within Iran
- Coordinates: 31°25′20″N 50°06′14″E
- Country: Iran
- Province: Khuzestan
- County: Seydun
- District: Central
- Established: 2022
- Capital: Banar-e Vajel
- Time zone: UTC+3:30 (IRST)

Vajel Rural District (Persian: دهستان واجل) is in the Central District (Note: Formerly Seydun District of Bagh-e Malek County) of Seydun County, Khuzestan province, Iran. Its capital is the village of Banar-e Vajel, whose population at the time of the 2016 National Census was 809 in 203 households.

== History ==
In 2022, Seydun District (Note: Renamed the Central District of Seydun County) was separated from Bagh-e Malek County in the establishment of Seydun County and renamed the Central District. Vajel Rural District was created in the new district.
