= Rudzir Rural District =

Rural district in Khuzestan province, Iran

Rudzir Rural District Persian: دهستان رودزیر
- Rural District
- Location within Iran
- Coordinates: 31°22′10″N 50°11′30″E
- Country: Iran
- Province: Khuzestan
- County: Seydun
- District: Ala
- Established: 2022
- Capital: Rudzir
- Time zone: UTC+3:30 (IRST)

Rudzir Rural District (Persian: دهستان رودزیر) is in Ala District of Seydun County, Khuzestan province, Iran. Its capital is the village of Rudzir, whose population at the time of the 2016 National Census was 890 in 205 households.

== History ==
In 2022, Seydun District (Note: Renamed the Central District of Seydun County) was separated from Bagh-e Malek County in the establishment of Seydun County and renamed the Central District. Rudzir Rural District was created in the new Ala District.
