= Ala District =

District in Khuzestan province, Iran

Ala District Persian: بخش علا
- District
- Location within Iran
- Coordinates: 31°19′37″N 50°09′44″E
- Country: Iran
- Province: Khuzestan
- County: Seydun
- Established: 2022
- Capital: Boneh Lam
- Time zone: UTC+3:30 (IRST)

Ala District (Persian: بخش علا) is in Seydun County, Khuzestan province, Iran. Its capital is the village of Boneh Lam, whose population at the time of the 2016 National Census was 1,539 people in 316 households.

== History ==
In 2022, Seydun District (Note: Renamed the Central District of Seydun County) was separated from Bagh-e Malek County in the establishment of Seydun County, which was divided into two districts of two rural districts each, with Seydun as its capital and only city.

== Demographics ==
=== Administrative divisions ===
Ala District
Administrative Divisions
Rudzir RD
Seydun-e Jonubi RD
RD = Rural District
