= Kalegah-e Amid Ali =

Kalegah-e Amid Ali كالگه اميد علي
- Village
- Location within Iran
- Coordinates: 33°58′38″N 47°29′41″E
- Country: Iran
- Province: Kermanshah
- County: Kermanshah
- Bakhsh: Firuzabad
- Rural District: Sar Firuzabad

Population (2006)
  - Total: 100
- Time zone: UTC+3:30 (IRST)
  - Summer (DST): UTC+4:30 (IRDT)

Kalegah-e Amid Ali (Persian: كالگه اميد علي, also Romanized as Kālegah-e Amīd ʿAlī; also known as Kalegah and Kālegeh) is a village in Sar Firuzabad Rural District, Firuzabad District, Kermanshah County, Kermanshah Province, Iran. At the 2006 census, its population was 100, in 21 families.
