= Darb Kazem =

Darb Kazem درب كاظم
- Village
- Location within Iran
- Coordinates: 31°58′17″N 50°02′50″E
- Country: Iran
- Province: Khuzestan
- County: Izeh
- Bakhsh: Susan
- Rural District: Susan-e Sharqi

Population (2006)
  - Total: 236
- Time zone: UTC+3:30 (IRST)
  - Summer (DST): UTC+4:30 (IRDT)

Darb Kazem (Persian: درب كاظم, also Romanized as Darb Kāẓem; also known as Darb) is a village in Susan-e Sharqi Rural District, Susan District, Izeh County, Khuzestan Province, Iran. At the 2006 census, its population was 236, in 42 families.
