= Kalgeh-ye Amir Sheykhi =

Kalgeh-ye Amir Sheykhi كلگه اميرشيخي
- Village
- Location within Iran
- Coordinates: 30°23′40″N 51°02′47″E
- Country: Iran
- Province: Kohgiluyeh and Boyer-Ahmad
- County: Basht
- Bakhsh: Central
- Rural District: Kuh Mareh Khami

Population (2006)
  - Total: 57
- Time zone: UTC+3:30 (IRST)
  - Summer (DST): UTC+4:30 (IRDT)

Kalgeh-ye Amir Sheykhi (Persian: كلگه اميرشيخي, also Romanized as Kalgeh-ye Amīr Sheykhī and Kalgāh-e Amīr Sheykhī; also known as Kalgah) is a village in Kuh Mareh Khami Rural District, in the Central District of Basht County, Kohgiluyeh and Boyer-Ahmad Province, Iran. At the 2006 census, its population was 57, in 15 families.
