= Seydun =

City in Khuzestan province, Iran

Seydun Persian: صيدون
- City
- Location within Iran
- Coordinates: 31°21′59″N 50°04′57″E
- Country: Iran
- Province: Khuzestan
- County: Seydun
- District: Central

Population (2016)
  - Total: 7,650
- Time zone: UTC+3:30 (IRST)

Seydun (Persian: صيدون) (Note: Also romanized as Şeydūn; also known as Şeydān) is a city in the Central District (Note: Formerly Seydun District of Bagh-e Malek County) of Seydun County, Khuzestan province, Iran, serving as capital of both the county and the district. It was the administrative center for Seydun-e Shomali Rural District until its capital was transferred to the village of Talavar-e Yek.

== Demographics ==
=== Population ===
At the time of the 2006 National Census, the city's population was 5,439 in 962 households, when it was in Seydun District (Note: Renamed the Central District of Seydun County) of Bagh-e Malek County). The following census in 2011 counted 6,588 people in 1,481 households. The 2016 census measured the population of the city as 7,650 people in 1,803 households.

In 2022, the district was separated from the county in the establishment of Seydun County and renamed the Central District.
