= Kalleh Gah, East Azerbaijan =

Kalleh Gah كله گاه
- Village
- Location within Iran
- Coordinates: 37°46′47″N 48°07′15″E
- Country: Iran
- Province: East Azerbaijan
- County: Meyaneh
- Bakhsh: Kandovan
- Rural District: Garmeh-ye Shomali

Population (2006)
  - Total: 45
- Time zone: UTC+3:30 (IRST)
  - Summer (DST): UTC+4:30 (IRDT)

Kalleh Gah (Persian: كله گاه, also Romanized as Kalleh Gāh and Kallehgāh) is a village in Garmeh-ye Shomali Rural District, Kandovan District, Meyaneh County, East Azerbaijan Province, Iran. At the 2006 census, its population was 45, in 15 families.
