= Qezmazari =

Qezmazari قزمزاري
- Village
- Location within Iran
- Coordinates: 30°07′11″N 51°20′06″E
- Country: Iran
- Province: Fars
- County: Mamasani
- Bakhsh: Central
- Rural District: Bakesh-e Do

Population (2006)
  - Total: 28
- Time zone: UTC+3:30 (IRST)
  - Summer (DST): UTC+4:30 (IRDT)

Qezmazari (Persian: قزمزاري, also Romanized as Qezmazārī; also known as Kalgāh-e Gorosneh) is a village in Bakesh-e Do Rural District, in the Central District of Mamasani County, Fars province, Iran. At the 2006 census, its population was 28, in 6 families.
