= Bahreh, Razavi Khorasan =

Bahreh بهره
- Village
- Location within Iran
- Coordinates: 36°41′24″N 59°36′07″E
- Country: Iran
- Province: Razavi Khorasan
- County: Mashhad
- Bakhsh: Central
- Rural District: Kardeh

Population (2006)
  - Total: 102
- Time zone: UTC+3:30 (IRST)
  - Summer (DST): UTC+4:30 (IRDT)

Bahreh (Persian: بهره) is a village in Kardeh Rural District, in the Central District of Mashhad County, Razavi Khorasan Province, Iran. At the 2006 census, its population was 102, in 31 families.

== See also ==
- List of cities, towns and villages in Razavi Khorasan Province
