= Doruhan-e Neqareh Khaneh =

Doruhan-e Neqareh Khaneh دروهان نقاره خانه
- Village
- Location within Iran
- Coordinates: 30°50′59″N 51°20′00″E
- Country: Iran
- Province: Kohgiluyeh and Boyer-Ahmad
- County: Dana
- Bakhsh: Kabgian
- Rural District: Kabgian

Population (2006)
  - Total: 555
- Time zone: UTC+3:30 (IRST)
  - Summer (DST): UTC+4:30 (IRDT)

Doruhan-e Neqareh Khaneh (Persian: دروهان نقاره خانه, also Romanized as Dorūhān-e Neqāreh Khāneh; also known as Dorūhān and Dūrūhān) is a village in Kabgian Rural District, Kabgian District, Dana County, Kohgiluyeh and Boyer-Ahmad Province, Iran. At the 2006 census, its population was 555, in 107 families.
