= Tang-e Palangi, Izeh =

Tang-e Palangi تنگ پلنگي
- Village
- Location within Iran
- Coordinates: 31°41′41″N 49°54′11″E
- Country: Iran
- Province: Khuzestan
- County: Izeh
- Bakhsh: Central
- Rural District: Holayjan

Population (2006)
  - Total: 65
- Time zone: UTC+3:30 (IRST)
  - Summer (DST): UTC+4:30 (IRDT)

Tang-e Palangi (Persian: تنگ پلنگي, also Romanized as Tang-e Palangī) is a village in Holayjan Rural District, in the Central District of Izeh County, Khuzestan Province, Iran. At the 2006 census, its population was 65, in 12 families.
