= Qaleh Tall =

City in Khuzestan province, Iran

Qaleh Tall Persian: قلعه‌تل
- City
- Location within Iran
- Coordinates: 31°37′59″N 49°53′23″E
- Country: Iran
- Province: Khuzestan
- County: Bagh-e Malek
- District: Qaleh Tall

Population (2016)
  - Total: 10,698
- Time zone: UTC+3:30 (IRST)

Qaleh Tall (Persian: قلعه‌تل) (Note: Also romanized as Qal‘eh Tall, Qal‘eh Tol, Qal’eh-e Tol, Qal‘eh-ye Tol; also known as Ghal‘eh Tal, Qal‘eh-i-Tul, and Qal‘eh-ye Tūl) is a city in, and the capital of, Qaleh Tall District of Bagh-e Malek County, Khuzestan province, Iran. It was the administrative center for Qaleh Tall Rural District until its capital was transferred to the village of Loran.

== Demographics ==
=== Population ===
At the time of the 2006 National Census, the city's population was 8,604 in 1,704 households, when it was in the Central District. The following census in 2011 counted 10,052 people in 2,346 households. The 2016 census measured the population of the city as 10,698 people in 2,716 households.

In 2023, Qaleh Tall was separated from the district in the formation of Qaleh Tall District.
