= Kalgah-e Sofla =

Kalgah-e Sofla كلگاه سفلي
- Village
- Location within Iran
- Coordinates: 30°07′47″N 51°27′14″E
- Country: Iran
- Province: Fars
- County: Mamasani
- Bakhsh: Central
- Rural District: Bakesh-e Do

Population (2006)
  - Total: 170
- Time zone: UTC+3:30 (IRST)
  - Summer (DST): UTC+4:30 (IRDT)

Kalgah-e Sofla (Persian: كلگاه سفلي, also Romanized as Kalgāh-e Soflá; also known as Gol Kāh-e Pā’īn and Kalgāh-e Pā’īn) is a village in Bakesh-e Do Rural District, in the Central District of Mamasani County, Fars province, Iran. At the 2006 census, its population was 170, in 35 families.
