= Kalgah Shiraz =

Kalgah Shiraz كلگاه شيراز
- Village
- Location within Iran
- Coordinates: 30°02′00″N 51°46′07″E
- Country: Iran
- Province: Fars
- County: Mamasani
- Bakhsh: Central
- Rural District: Bakesh-e Yek

Population (2006)
  - Total: 327
- Time zone: UTC+3:30 (IRST)
  - Summer (DST): UTC+4:30 (IRDT)

Kalgah Shiraz (Persian: كلگاه شيراز, also Romanized as Kalgāh Shīrāz; also known as Kalgāh Shīrāz-e Bālā, Kalgāh Shīrāz 'Olyā, and Kalgān Shīrāz-e Bālā) is a village in Bakesh-e Yek Rural District, in the Central District of Mamasani County, Fars province, Iran. At the 2006 census, its population was 327, in 80 families.
