= Kalleh Gah, Kohgiluyeh and Boyer-Ahmad =

Kalleh Gah كله گه
- Village
- Location within Iran
- Coordinates: 31°06′26″N 51°09′33″E
- Country: Iran
- Province: Kohgiluyeh and Boyer-Ahmad
- County: Dana
- Bakhsh: Pataveh
- Rural District: Sadat Mahmudi

Population (2006)
  - Total: 90
- Time zone: UTC+3:30 (IRST)
  - Summer (DST): UTC+4:30 (IRDT)

Kalleh Gah (Persian: كله گه; also known as Kallehgeh-ye Sādāt-e Maḩmūdī) is a village in Sadat Mahmudi Rural District, Pataveh District, Dana County, Kohgiluyeh and Boyer-Ahmad Province, Iran. At the 2006 census, its population was 90, in 20 families.
