= Godar Pahn, Ramhormoz =

Godar Pahn گدارپهن
- Village
- Location within Iran
- Coordinates: 31°06′55″N 49°50′07″E
- Country: Iran
- Province: Khuzestan
- County: Ramhormoz
- Bakhsh: Central
- Rural District: Soltanabad

Population (2006)
  - Total: 138
- Time zone: UTC+3:30 (IRST)
  - Summer (DST): UTC+4:30 (IRDT)

Godar Pahn (Persian: گدارپهن, also Romanized as Godār Pahn; also known as Godār Chaman) is a village in Soltanabad Rural District, in the Central District of Ramhormoz County, Khuzestan Province, Iran. At the 2006 census, its population was 138, in 27 families.
