= Kalgah, Fars =

Kalgah كل گاه
- Village
- Location within Iran
- Coordinates: 30°16′54″N 52°06′09″E
- Country: Iran
- Province: Fars
- County: Sepidan
- Bakhsh: Hamaijan
- Rural District: Shesh Pir

Population (2006)
  - Total: 106
- Time zone: UTC+3:30 (IRST)
  - Summer (DST): UTC+4:30 (IRDT)

Kalgah (Persian: كل گاه, also Romanized as Kalgāh; also known as Kaleh Gāh, Kalgeh, Kalleh Gāh, Shūl, and Skūl-e Kaleh Gāh) is a village in Shesh Pir Rural District, Hamaijan District, Sepidan County, Fars province, Iran. At the 2006 census, its population was 106, in 18 families.
