= Qaleh Tall District =

District in Khuzestan province, Iran

Qaleh Tall District Persian: بخش قلعه تل
- District
- Location within Iran
- Coordinates: 31°37′13″N 49°54′18″E
- Country: Iran
- Province: Khuzestan
- County: Bagh-e Malek
- Capital: Qaleh Tall
- Time zone: UTC+3:30 (IRST)

Qaleh Tall District (Persian: بخش قلعه تل) is in Bagh-e Malek County, Khuzestan province, Iran. Its capital is the city of Qaleh Tall, whose population at the time of the 2016 National Census was 10,698 people in 2,716 households.

== History ==
In 2023, Qaleh Tall Rural District and the city of Qaleh Tall were separated from the Central District in the formation of Qaleh Tall District.

== Demographics ==
=== Administrative divisions ===
Qaleh Tall District
Administrative Divisions
Barangerd RD
Qaleh Tall RD
Qaleh Tall (city)
RD = Rural District
