= Vareh Zardi, Khorramabad =

Vareh Zardi وره زردي
- Village
- Location within Iran
- Coordinates: 33°33′00″N 48°26′00″E
- Country: Iran
- Province: Lorestan
- County: Khorramabad
- Bakhsh: Central
- Rural District: Dehpir-e Shomali

Population (2006)
  - Total: 117
- Time zone: UTC+3:30 (IRST)
  - Summer (DST): UTC+4:30 (IRDT)

Vareh Zardi (Persian: وره زردي, also Romanized as Vareh Zardī; also known as Var Zardī and Nareh Zardī) is a village in Dehpir-e Shomali Rural District, in the Central District of Khorramabad County, Lorestan Province, Iran. At the 2006 census, its population was 117 people in 28 families.
