= Kalleh Gah, Ilam =

Kalleh Gah كله گه
- Village
- Location within Iran
- Coordinates: 33°45′29″N 47°24′57″E
- Country: Iran
- Province: Ilam
- County: Chardavol
- Bakhsh: Helilan
- Rural District: Zardalan

Population (2006)
  - Total: 32
- Time zone: UTC+3:30 (IRST)
  - Summer (DST): UTC+4:30 (IRDT)

Kalleh Gah (Persian: كله گه; also known as Kalegah) is a village in Zardalan Rural District, Helilan District, Chardavol County, Ilam Province, Iran. At the 2006 census, its population was 32, in 6 families. The village is populated by Kurds.
