= Kalegah-e Zaman =

Kalegah-e Zaman كلگاه زمان
- Village
- Location within Iran
- Coordinates: 34°54′08″N 47°40′20″E
- Country: Iran
- Province: Kermanshah
- County: Sonqor
- Bakhsh: Central
- Rural District: Bavaleh

Population (2006)
  - Total: 837
- Time zone: UTC+3:30 (IRST)
  - Summer (DST): UTC+4:30 (IRDT)

Kalegah-e Zaman (Persian: كلگاه زمان, also Romanized as Kalegāh-e Zamān and Kalgāh-e Zamān; also known as Kalgah, Kalgāh, and Kalgeh) is a village in Bavaleh Rural District, in the Central District of Sonqor County, Kermanshah Province, Iran. At the 2006 census, its population was 837, in 165 families.
