= Meydavud, Iran =

City in Khuzestan province, Iran

Meydavud Persian: ميداود
- City
- Location within Iran
- Coordinates: 31°22′27″N 49°49′03″E
- Country: Iran
- Province: Khuzestan
- County: Bagh-e Malek
- District: Meydavud

Population (2016)
  - Total: 3,513
- Time zone: UTC+3:30 (IRST)

Meydavud (Persian: ميداود) (Note: Formerly the village of Meydavud-e Sofla (ميداودسفلي), also romanized as Meidavood Sofla and Meydāvūd-e Soflá; also known as Mai Dāūd Pāīn, Meydāvūd Pā’īn, and Meydāvūd-e Pā’īn) is a city in, and the capital of, Meydavud District of Bagh-e Malek County, Khuzestan province, Iran. It also serves as the administrative center for Meydavud Rural District.

== Demographics ==
=== Population ===
At the time of the 2006 National Census, the population was 2,331 in 468 households, as the village of Meydavud-e Sofla in Meydavud Rural District. The following census in 2011 counted 3,590 people in 855 households, by which time the village had been elevated to city status as Meydavud. The 2016 census measured the population of the city as 3,513 people in 933 households.
