= Seydun County =

County in Khuzestan province, Iran

Seydun County Persian: شهرستان صیدون
- County
- Location of Seydun County in Khuzestan province (right, yellow)

- Location of Khuzestan province in Iran
- Coordinates: 31°22′50″N 50°07′25″E
- Country: Iran
- Province: Khuzestan
- Established: 2022
- Capital: Seydun
- Districts: Central, Alad
- Time zone: UTC+3:30 (IRST)

Seydun County (Persian: شهرستان صیدون) is in Khuzestan province, Iran. Its capital is the city of Seydun, whose population at the time of the 2016 National Census was 7,650 people in 1,803 households.

== History ==
In 2022, Seydun District (Note: Renamed the Central District of Seydun County) was separated from Bagh-e Malek County in the establishment of Seydun County, which was divided into two districts of two rural districts each, with Seydun as its capital and only city.

== Demographics ==
=== Administrative divisions ===
Seydun County's administrative structure is shown in the following table.

Seydun County
Administrative Divisions
Central District (Note: Formerly Seydun District of Bagh-e Malek County)
Seydun-e Shomali RD (Note: Formerly Seydun Rural District)
Vajel RD
Seydun (city)
Ala District
Rudzir RD
Seydun-e Jonubi RD
RD = Rural District

== See also ==
Media related to Seydun County at Wikimedia Commons
