= Meydavud Rural District =

Rural district in Khuzestan province, Iran

Meydavud Rural District Persian: دهستان ميداود
- Rural District
- Location within Iran
- Coordinates: 31°23′48″N 49°51′54″E
- Country: Iran
- Province: Khuzestan
- County: Bagh-e Malek
- District: Meydavud
- Capital: Meydavud

Population (2016)
  - Total: 3,730
- Time zone: UTC+3:30 (IRST)

Meydavud Rural District (Persian: دهستان ميداود) is in Meydavud District of Bagh-e Malek County, Khuzestan province, Iran. It is administered from the city of Meydavud. (Note: Formerly the village of Meydavud-e Sofla)

== Demographics ==
=== Population ===
At the time of the 2006 National Census, the rural district's population was 8,768 in 1,808 households. There were 4,493 inhabitants in 1,095 households at the following census of 2011. The 2016 census measured the population of the rural district as 3,730 in 975 households. The most populous of its 19 villages was Meydavud-e Vosta, with 798 people.
