= Mongasht Rural District =

Rural district in Khuzestan province, Iran

Mongasht Rural District Persian: دهستان منگشت
- Rural District
- Location within Iran
- Coordinates: 31°31′57″N 49°57′58″E
- Country: Iran
- Province: Khuzestan
- County: Bagh-e Malek
- District: Central
- Capital: Abu ol Abbas

Population (2016)
  - Total: 9,980
- Time zone: UTC+3:30 (IRST)

Mongasht Rural District (Persian: دهستان منگشت) is in the Central District of Bagh-e Malek County, Khuzestan province, Iran. Its capital is the village of Abu ol Abbas.

== Demographics ==
=== Population ===
At the time of the 2006 National Census, the rural district's population was 10,274 in 1,932 households. There were 10,920 inhabitants in 2,446 households at the following census of 2011. The 2016 census measured the population of the rural district as 9,980 in 2,418 households. The most populous of its 22 villages was Abu ol Abbas, with 1,690 people.
