= Seydun-e Shomali Rural District =

Rural district in Khuzestan province, Iran

Seydun-e Shomali Rural District Persian: دهستان صيدون شمالی
- Rural District
- Location within Iran
- Coordinates: 31°22′02″N 50°06′30″E
- Country: Iran
- Province: Khuzestan
- County: Seydun
- District: Central
- Capital: Talavar-e Yek

Population (2016)
  - Total: 6,291
- Time zone: UTC+3:30 (IRST)

Seydun-e Shomali Rural District (Persian: دهستان صيدون شمالی) (Note: Formerly Seydun Rural District (دهستان صيدون)) is in the Central District (Note: Formerly Seydun District of Bagh-e Malek County) of Seydun County, Khuzestan province, Iran. Its capital is the village of Talavar-e Yek. The rural district was previously administered from the city of Seydun.

== Demographics ==
=== Population ===
At the time of the 2006 National Census, the rural district's population (as Seydun Rural District of Seydun District (Note: Renamed the Central District of Seydun County) in Bagh-e Malek County) was 7,078 in 1,284 households. There were 6,622 inhabitants in 1,430 households at the following census of 2011. The 2016 census measured the population of the rural district as 6,291 in 1,516 households. The most populous of its 51 villages was Sar Darreh, with 868 people.

In 2022, the district was separated from the county in the establishment of Seydun County and renamed the Central District.
