= Haparu Rural District =

Rural district in Khuzestan province, Iran

Haparu Rural District Persian: دهستان هپرو
- Rural District
- Location within Iran
- Coordinates: 31°27′35″N 49°59′56″E
- Country: Iran
- Province: Khuzestan
- County: Bagh-e Malek
- District: Central
- Capital: Durtu

Population (2016)
  - Total: 10,941
- Time zone: UTC+3:30 (IRST)

Haparu Rural District (Persian: دهستان هپرو) is in the Central District of Bagh-e Malek County, Khuzestan province, Iran. Its capital is the village of Durtu.

== Demographics ==
=== Population ===
At the time of the 2006 National Census, the rural district's population was 10,888 in 2,004 households. There were 11,495 inhabitants in 2,480 households at the following census of 2011. The 2016 census measured the population of the rural district as 10,941 in 2,618 households. The most populous of its 45 villages was Do Rahi-ye Eslamabad, with 1,099 people.
