= Qaleh Tall Rural District =

Rural district in Khuzestan province, Iran

Qaleh Tall Rural District Persian: دهستان قلعه تل
- Rural District
- Location within Iran
- Coordinates: 31°37′13″N 49°56′18″E
- Country: Iran
- Province: Khuzestan
- County: Bagh-e Malek
- District: Qaleh Tall
- Capital: Loran

Population (2016)
  - Total: 7,582
- Time zone: UTC+3:30 (IRST)

Qaleh Tall Rural District (Persian: دهستان قلعه تل) is in Qaleh Tall District of Bagh-e Malek County, Khuzestan province, Iran. Its capital is the village of Loran. The rural district was previously administered from the city of Qaleh Tall.

== Demographics ==
=== Population ===
At the time of the 2006 National Census, the rural district's population (as a part of the Central District) was 8,403 in 1,690 households. There were 8,069 inhabitants in 1,807 households at the following census of 2011. The 2016 census measured the population of the rural district as 7,582 in 1,926 households. The most populous of its 54 villages was Barangerd, with 1,349 people.

In 2023, the rural district was separated from the district in the formation of Qaleh Tall District.
