= Saroleh Rural District =

Rural district in Khuzestan province, Iran

Saroleh Rural District Persian: دهستان سرله
- Rural District
- Location within Iran
- Coordinates: 31°17′48″N 49°56′50″E
- Country: Iran
- Province: Khuzestan
- County: Bagh-e Malek
- District: Meydavud
- Capital: Dalan

Population (2016)
  - Total: 8,059
- Time zone: UTC+3:30 (IRST)

Saroleh Rural District (Persian: دهستان سرله) is in Meydavud District of Bagh-e Malek County, Khuzestan province, Iran. Its capital is the village of Dalan.

== Demographics ==
=== Population ===
At the time of the 2006 National Census, the rural district's population was 9,820 in 1,950 households. There were 9,642 inhabitants in 2,180 households at the following census of 2011. The 2016 census measured the population of the rural district as 8,059 in 1,984 households. The most populous of its 53 villages was Godar Pahn, with 1,278 people.
