= Seydun-e Jonubi Rural District =

Rural district in Khuzestan province, Iran

Seydun-e Jonubi Rural District Persian: دهستان صيدون جنوبی
- Rural District
- Location within Iran
- Coordinates: 31°18′03″N 50°07′18″E
- Country: Iran
- Province: Khuzestan
- County: Seydun
- District: Ala
- Established: 2000
- Capital: Alad

Population (2016)
  - Total: 8,305
- Time zone: UTC+3:30 (IRST)

Seydun-e Jonubi Rural District (Persian: دهستان صيدون جنوبی) is in Ala District of Seydun County, Khuzestan province, Iran. Its capital is the village of Alad. The previous capital of the rural district was the village of Rudzir.

== Demographics ==
=== Population ===
At the time of the 2006 National Census, the rural district's population (as a part of Seydun District (Note: Renamed the Central District of Seydun County) of Bagh-e Malek County) was 9,895 in 1,766 households. There were 9,755 inhabitants in 1,972 households at the following census of 2011. The 2016 census measured the population of the rural district as 8,305 in 1,878 households. The most populous of its 54 villages was Boneh Lam, with 1,539 people.

In 2022, the district was separated from the county in the establishment of Seydun County and renamed the Central District. The rural district was transferred to the new Ala District.
