= Meydavud District =

District in Khuzestan province, Iran

Meydavud District Persian: بخش میداود
- District
- Location within Iran
- Coordinates: 31°20′15″N 49°54′34″E
- Country: Iran
- Province: Khuzestan
- County: Bagh-e Malek
- Capital: Meydavud

Population (2016)
  - Total: 15,302
- Time zone: UTC+3:30 (IRST)

Meydavud District (Persian: بخش میداود) is in Bagh-e Malek County, Khuzestan province, Iran. Its capital is the city of Meydavud. (Note: Formerly the village of Meydavud-e Sofla)

== History ==
After the 2006 National Census, the village of Meydavud-e Sofla was elevated to city status as Meydavud.

== Demographics ==
=== Population ===
At the time of the 2006 census, the district's population was 18,588 in 3,758 households. The following census in 2011 counted 17,725 people in 4,130 households. The 2016 census measured the population of the district as 15,302 inhabitants in 3,892 households.

=== Administrative divisions ===
Meydavud District Population
Administrative Divisions	2006	2011	2016
Meydavud RD	8,768	4,493	3,730
Saroleh RD	9,820	9,642	8,059
Meydavud (city)		3,590	3,513
Total	18,588	17,725	15,302
RD = Rural District
