= Central District (Seydun County) =

District in Khuzestan province, Iran

Central District (Seydun County) Persian: بخش مرکزی شهرستان صیدون
- District
- Location within Iran
- Coordinates: 31°24′50″N 50°05′23″E
- Country: Iran
- Province: Khuzestan
- County: Seydun
- Established: 2022
- Capital: Seydun

Population (2016)
  - Total: 22,246 (Note: Seydun District of Bagh-e Malek County)
- Time zone: UTC+3:30 (IRST)

The Central District of Seydun County (Note: Formerly Seydun District of Bagh-e Malek County) (Persian: بخش مرکزی شهرستان صیدون) is in Khuzestan province, Iran. Its capital is the city of Seydun.

== History ==
In 2022, Seydun District (Note: Renamed the Central District) was separated from Bagh-e Malek County in the establishment of Seydun County, which was divided into two districts of two rural districts each, with Seydun as its capital and only city.

== Demographics ==
=== Population ===
At the time of the 2006 National Census, the district's population (as Seydun District of Bagh-e Malek County) was 22,412 in 4,012 households. The following census in 2011 counted 22,965 people in 4,883 households. The 2016 census measured the population of the district as 22,246 inhabitants in 5,197 households.

=== Administrative divisions ===
Central District (Seydun County) Population (Note: As Seydun District of Bagh-e Malek County at the 2006, 2011, and 2016 censuses)
Administrative Divisions	2006	2011	2016
Seydun-e Jonubi RD (Note: Transferred to Alad District)	9,895	9,755	8,305
Seydun-e Shomali RD (Note: Formerly Seydun Rural District)	7,078	6,622	6,291
Vajel RD (Note: Established after the 2016 census)			
Seydun (city)	5,439	6,588	7,650
Total	22,412	22,965	22,246
RD = Rural District
