= Central District (Bagh-e Malek County) =

District in Khuzestan province, Iran

Central District (Bagh-e Malek County) Persian: بخش مرکزی شهرستان باغ ‌ملک
- District
- Location within Iran
- Coordinates: 31°32′32″N 49°48′06″E
- Country: Iran
- Province: Khuzestan
- County: Bagh-e Malek
- Capital: Bagh-e Malek

Population (2016)
  - Total: 67,827
- Time zone: UTC+3:30 (IRST)

The Central District of Bagh-e Malek County (Persian: بخش مرکزی شهرستان باغ ‌ملک) is in Khuzestan province, Iran. Its capital is the city of Bagh-e Malek.

== History ==
After the 2006 National Census, the village of Meydavud-e Sofla was elevated to city status as Meydavud. In 2023, Qaleh Tall Rural District and the city of Qaleh Tall were separated from the district in the formation of Qaleh Tall District.

== Demographics ==
=== Population ===
At the time of the 2006 census, the district's population was 62,217 in 12,044 households. The following census in 2011 counted 66,700 people in 14,967 households. The 2016 census measured the population of the district as 67,827 inhabitants in 16,781 households.

=== Administrative divisions ===
Central District (Bagh-e Malek County) Population
Administrative Divisions	2006	2011	2016
Haparu RD	10,888	11,495	10,941
Mongasht RD	10,274	10,920	9,980
Qaleh Tall RD (Note: Transferred to Qaleh Tall District after the 2016 census)	8,403	8,069	7,582
Rud Zard RD	3,204	2,812	2,283
Bagh-e Malek (city)	20,844	23,352	26,343
Qaleh Tall (city)	8,604	10,052	10,698
Total	62,217	66,700	67,827
RD = Rural District
