= Bagh-e Malek County =

County in Khuzestan province, Iran

Bagh-e Malek County Persian: شهرستان باغ‌ملک
- County
- Location of Bagh-e Malek County in Khuzestan Province (center right, purple)

- Location of Khuzestan Province in Iran
- Coordinates: 31°30′51″N 49°47′48″E
- Country: Iran
- Province: Khuzestan
- Capital: Bagh-e Malek
- Districts: Central, Meydavud, Qaleh Tall

Population (2016)
  - Total: 105,384
- Time zone: UTC+3:30 (IRST)

Bagh-e Malek County (Persian: شهرستان باغ‌ملک) is in Khuzestan province, Iran. Its capital is the city of Bagh-e Malek.

== History ==
After the 2006 National Census, the village of Meydavud-e Sofla was elevated to city status as Meydavud.

In 2023, Seydun District was separated from the county in the establishment of Seydun County. Additionally, Qaleh Tall Rural District and the city of Qaleh Tall were separated from the Central District in the formation of Qaleh Tall District, including the new Barangerd Rural District.

== Demographics ==
=== Population ===
At the time of the 2006 census, the county's population was 103,217 in 19,814 households. The following census in 2011 counted 107,450 people in 23,976 households. The 2016 census measured the population of the county as 105,384 in 25,872 households.

=== Administrative divisions ===
Bagh-e Malek County's population history and administrative structure over three consecutive censuses are shown in the following table.

Bagh-e Malek County Population
Administrative Divisions	2006	2011	2016
Central District	62,217	66,700	67,827
Haparu RD	10,888	11,495	10,941
Mongasht RD	10,274	10,920	9,980
Qaleh Tall RD	8,403	8,069	7,582
Rud Zard RD	3,204	2,812	2,283
Bagh-e Malek (city)	20,844	23,352	26,343
Qaleh Tall (city)	8,604	10,052	10,698
Meydavud District	18,588	17,725	15,302
Meydavud RD	8,768	4,493	3,730
Saroleh RD	9,820	9,642	8,059
Meydavud (city) (Note: Formerly Meydavud-e Sofla)		3,590	3,513
Qaleh Tall District (Note: Established after the 2016 census)			
Barangerd RD			
Qaleh Tall RD			
Qaleh Tall (city)			
Seydun District (Note: Transferred to Seydun County and renamed the Central District after the 2016 census)	22,412	22,965	22,246
Seydun-e Jonubi RD	9,895	9,755	8,305
Seydun-e Shomali RD (Note: Formerly Seydun Rural District)	7,078	6,622	6,291
Seydun (city)	5,439	6,588	7,650
Total	103,217	107,450	105,384
RD = Rural District

== See also ==
Media related to Bagh-e Malek County at Wikimedia Commons
