= Kuli =

Kuli may refer to:

== Places ==
=== Ghana ===
- Kuli, Ghana, a village in Tolon District in the Northern Region of Ghana

=== Iran ===
- Kuli Alikhan, a village in Khuzestan Province
- Kuli Alireza, a village in Khuzestan Province
- Kuli Bakhtiari, a village in Khuzestan Province
- Kuli Darreh
- Kuli Khoda Karam, a village in Khuzestan Province
- Kuli Mohammad Hoseyn, a village in Khuzestan Province
- Kuli Rostam, a village in Khuzestan Province
- Kuli Seran
- Kuli, West Azerbaijan, a village in West Azerbaijan Province

=== North Macedonia ===
- Markovi Kuli

=== Norway ===
- Kuli, Norway, a small island in Smøla Municipality in Møre og Romsdal county

=== Russia ===
- Kuli, Akushinsky District, Republic of Dagestan
- Kuli, Kulinsky District, Republic of Dagestan

== Other uses ==
- Nickname of Ali Kuli Khan Khattak (20th century), former chief of military intelligence of the Pakistan Army
- Bekim Kuli (born 1982), Albanian football striker
- Coolie, an offensive term for a labourer from Asia
- The Kuli stone or Kulisteinen, a runestone in Norway
- An umbrella term used by the Dagbamba of West Africa for funerals and the traditional rituals around them

== See also ==
- Coolie (disambiguation)
- Quli (disambiguation)
