= Sarcheshmeh (disambiguation) =

Sarcheshmeh or Sar Cheshmeh or Sarchashmeh (Persian: سرچشمه) may also refer to:

- Mes-e Sarcheshmeh, a city in Iran
- Cheshmeh Kabud, Mirbag-e Shomali, Iran, also known as Sarcheshmeh-ye Kabud
- Sar Cheshmeh, Ghor, Afghanistan
- Sar Chesmeh, Wardak, Afghanistan
- Sar Cheshmeh, Bushehr, Iran
- Sar Cheshmeh, East Azerbaijan, Iran
- Sarcheshmeh, Hashtrud, a village in East Azerbaijan Province, Iran
- Sar Cheshmeh, Fars, Iran
- Sar Cheshmeh, Gilan, Iran
- Sar Cheshmeh, Golestan, Iran
- Sar Cheshmeh, Isfahan, Iran
- Sarcheshmeh, Jiroft, a village in Kerman Province, Iran
- Sar Cheshmeh, Rabor, a village in Kerman Province, Iran
- Sarcheshmeh Rural District, in Kerman Province, Iran
- Sar Cheshmeh-ye Olya, a village in Khuzestan Province, Iran
- Sar Cheshmeh-ye Sofla, a village in Khuzestan Province, Iran
- Sarcheshmeh-ye Talkhab, a village in Khuzestan Province, Iran
- Sarcheshmeh-ye Mushemi, a village in Kohgiluyeh and Boyer-Ahmad Province, Iran
- Sar Cheshmeh, Kurdistan, a village in Kurdistan Province
- Sar Cheshmeh, Kamyaran, a village in Kurdistan Province
- Sar Cheshmeh, Chalus, a village in Mazandaran Province
- Sar Cheshmeh, Kelardasht, a village in Mazandaran Province
- Sar Cheshmeh, Bojnord, a village in North Khorasan Province, Iran
- Sar Cheshmeh, Esfarayen, a village in North Khorasan Province, Iran
- Sar Cheshmeh, Shirvan, a village in North Khorasan Province, Iran
- Sar Cheshmeh, Razavi Khorasan, Iran
- Sar Cheshmeh, Yazd, Iran
- Sarcheshmeh-e Kamalvand, Iran
- Sarcheshmeh, a copper mine in Iran
