= Darvishan, Iran =

Darvishan, Iran (Persian: درويشان) may refer to:

- Darvishan, Bushehr
- Darvishan, Fars
- Darvishan, Kermanshah
- Darvishan, Khuzestan
- Darvishan-e Yek, Khuzestan Province
- Darvishan, Divandarreh, Kurdistan Province
- Darvishan, Sanandaj, Kurdistan Province
- Darvishan, Markazi
- Darvishan, Mazandaran
- Darvishan, West Azerbaijan
- Darvishan Sarbisheh
