= Deymeh =

Deymeh (Persian: ديمه) may refer to:

- Deymeh, Chaharmahal and Bakhtiari
- Deymeh, Kurdistan
- Deymeh Darb
- Deymeh Kamar
- Deymeh-ye Dagher
- Deymeh-ye Kuchek
- Deymeh-ye Yaqub

== See also ==
- Dimeh (disambiguation)
