= Darreh Tu Nem Nemi =

Village in Khuzestan province, Iran

Darreh Tu Nem Nemi Persian: دره تونم نمي
- Village
- Location within Iran
- Coordinates: 31°09′55″N 49°54′57″E
- Country: Iran
- Province: Khuzestan
- County: Ramhormoz
- District: Abolfares
- Rural District: Seh Tolun

Population (2016)
  - Total: 1,257
- Time zone: UTC+3:30 (IRST)

Darreh Tu Nem Nemi (Persian: دره تونم نمي) (Note: Also romanized as Darreh Tū Nem Nemī; also known as Darreh Nem Nemī and Darreh Nemnemī) is a village in Seh Tolun Rural District of Abolfares District, Ramhormoz County, Khuzestan province, Iran.

== Demographics ==
=== Population ===
At the time of the 2006 National Census, the village's population was 1,416 in 311 households, when it was in Abolfares Rural District of the Central District. The following census in 2011 counted 1,501 people in 351 households. The 2016 census measured the population of the village as 1,257 people in 333 households, by which time the rural district had been separated from the district in the formation of Abolfares District.Darreh Tu Nem Nemi was transferred to Seh Tolun Rural District created in the new district. It was the most populous village in its rural district.
