= Pagachi =

Pagachi or Pa Gachi (Persian: پاگچي) may refer to:

- Pa Gachi, Kohgiluyeh and Boyer-Ahmad
- Pagachi-ye Bahmai
- Pagachi-ye Mambini
- Pagachi-ye Markazi

== See also ==
- Pagach (disambiguation)
