= Gonbadlaran =

Village in Khuzestan province, Iran

Gonbadlaran Persian: گنبدلران
- Village
- Location within Iran
- Coordinates: 31°17′46″N 49°47′01″E
- Country: Iran
- Province: Khuzestan
- County: Ramhormoz
- District: Rud Zard
- Rural District: Mamatin

Population (2016)
  - Total: 426
- Time zone: UTC+3:30 (IRST)

Gonbadlaran (Persian: گنبدلران) (Note: Also romanized as Gonbadlarān) is a village in, and the capital of, Mamatin Rural District of Rud Zard District, Ramhormoz County, Khuzestan province, Iran.

== Demographics ==
=== Population ===
At the time of the 2006 National Census, the village's population was 444 in 96 households, when it was in Howmeh-ye Sharqi Rural District of the Central District. The following census in 2011 counted 476 people in 108 households. The 2016 census measured the population of the village as 426 people in 108 households, by which time the village had been separated from the district in the formation of Rud Zard District. Gonbadlaran was transferred to Mamatin Rural District created in the new district. It was the most populous village in its rural district.
