= Seh Tolun =

Village in Khuzestan province, Iran

Seh Tolun Persian: سه تلون
- Village
- Location within Iran
- Coordinates: 31°11′57″N 49°53′45″E
- Country: Iran
- Province: Khuzestan
- County: Ramhormoz
- District: Abolfares
- Rural District: Seh Tolun

Population (2016)
  - Total: 1,182
- Time zone: UTC+3:30 (IRST)

Seh Tolun (Persian: سه تلون) (Note: Also romanized as Seh Talvan and Seh Tolūn; also known as Seh Tūlūn) is a village in, and the capital of, Seh Tolun Rural District of Abolfares District, Ramhormoz County, Khuzestan province, Iran.

== Demographics ==
=== Population ===
At the time of the 2006 National Census, the village's population was 1,121 in 219 households, when it was in Abolfares Rural District of the Central District. The following census in 2011 counted 1,239 people in 297 households. The 2016 census measured the population of the village as 1,182 people in 294 households, by which time the rural district had been separated from the district in the formation of Abolfares District. Seh Tolun was transferred to Seh Tolun Rural District created in the new district.
