= Zoveydi =

Zoveydi (Persian: زويدي), sometimes rendered as Zobeydi or Zobidi, may refer to:

- Zobeydi, Shadegan
- Zoveydi-ye Maghamez
- Zoveydi-ye Musa
- Zoveydi-ye Ramezan
