= Rostamabad, Ramhormoz =

Village in Khuzestan province, Iran

Rostamabad Persian: رستم اباد
- Village
- Location within Iran
- Coordinates: 31°10′43″N 49°38′54″E
- Country: Iran
- Province: Khuzestan
- County: Ramhormoz
- District: Soltanabad
- Rural District: Rostamabad

Population (2016)
  - Total: 706
- Time zone: UTC+3:30 (IRST)

Rostamabad (Persian: رستم اباد) (Note: Also romanized as Rostamābād) is a village in, and the capital of, Rostamabad Rural District of Soltanabad District, Ramhormoz County, Khuzestan province, Iran.

== Demographics ==
=== Population ===
At the time of the 2006 National Census, the village's population was 1,039 in 246 households, when it was in Howmeh-ye Sharqi Rural District of the Central District. The following census in 2011 counted 726 people in 196 households. The 2016 census measured the population of the village as 706 people in 210 households, by which time the village had been separated from the district in the formation of Soltanabad District. Rostamabad was transferred to Rostamabad Rural district created in the new district. It was the most populous village in its rural district.
