= Lapui-ye Yek =

Lapui-ye Yek لپويي يك
- Village
- Location within Iran
- Coordinates: 31°11′47″N 49°36′20″E
- Country: Iran
- Province: Khuzestan
- County: Ramhormoz
- Bakhsh: Central
- Rural District: Howmeh-ye Sharqi

Population (2006)
  - Total: 54
- Time zone: UTC+3:30 (IRST)
  - Summer (DST): UTC+4:30 (IRDT)

Lapui-ye Yek (Persian: لپويي يك, also Romanized as Lapū’ī-ye Yek; also known as Lapū’ī) is a village in Howmeh-ye Sharqi Rural District, in the Central District of Ramhormoz County, Khuzestan Province, Iran. At the 2006 census, its population was 54, in 8 families.
