= Basadi, Iran =

Basadi or Basedi (Persian: باصدي) may refer to:

- Basadi-ye Hajj Barun
- Basadi-ye Olya
- Basadi-ye Sofla

== See also ==
- Basadi, a type of Jain temples in India
- Panchakuta Basadi (disambiguation)
