= Eyn-e Hammad =

Eyn-e Hammad عين حماد
- Village
- Location within Iran
- Coordinates: 31°20′35″N 49°27′53″E
- Country: Iran
- Province: Khuzestan
- County: Ramhormoz
- Bakhsh: Central
- Rural District: Howmeh-ye Gharbi

Population (2006)
  - Total: 163
- Time zone: UTC+3:30 (IRST)
  - Summer (DST): UTC+4:30 (IRDT)

Eyn-e Hammad (Persian: عين حماد, also Romanized as ‘Eyn-e Ḩammād, ‘Eyn-e Hamād, and ‘Eyn Ḩamād) is a village in Howmeh-ye Gharbi Rural District, in the Central District of Ramhormoz County, Khuzestan Province, Iran. At the 2006 census, its population was 163, in 28 families.
