= Kayid Ali Khan =

Kayid Ali Khan كايدعلي خان
- Village
- Country: Iran
- Province: Khuzestan
- County: Ramhormoz
- Bakhsh: Central
- Rural District: Howmeh-ye Sharqi

Population (2006)
  - Total: 552
- Time zone: UTC+3:30 (IRST)
  - Summer (DST): UTC+4:30 (IRDT)

Kayid Ali Khan (Persian: كايدعلي خان, also Romanized as Kāyīd ʿAlī Khān) is a village in Howmeh-ye Sharqi Rural District, in the Central District of Ramhormoz County, Khuzestan Province, Iran. At the 2006 census, its population was 552, in 135 families.
