= Savadeh =

Savadeh سواده
- Village
- Location within Iran
- Coordinates: 31°19′52″N 49°28′27″E
- Country: Iran
- Province: Khuzestan
- County: Ramhormoz
- Bakhsh: Central
- Rural District: Howmeh-ye Gharbi

Population (2006)
  - Total: 42
- Time zone: UTC+3:30 (IRST)
  - Summer (DST): UTC+4:30 (IRDT)

Savadeh (Persian: سواده, also Romanized as Savādeh and Sovādeh; also known as Suvādah), is a village in Howmeh-ye Gharbi Rural District, in the Central District of Ramhormoz County, Khuzestan Province, Iran. At the 2006 census, its population was 42, in 7 families.
