= Jafar-e Sadeq =

Jafar-e Sadeq جعفرصادق
- Village
- Location within Iran
- Coordinates: 31°11′21″N 49°39′07″E
- Country: Iran
- Province: Khuzestan
- County: Ramhormoz
- Bakhsh: Central
- Rural District: Howmeh-ye Sharqi

Population (2006)
  - Total: 444
- Time zone: UTC+3:30 (IRST)
  - Summer (DST): UTC+4:30 (IRDT)

Jafar-e Sadeq (Persian: جعفرصادق, also Romanized as Ja‘far-e Şādeq and Ja‘far Şādeq; also known as Ja’far Sadegh) is a village in Howmeh-ye Sharqi Rural District, in the Central District of Ramhormoz County, Khuzestan Province, Iran. At the 2006 census, its population was 444, in 97 families.
