= Badkam =

Badkam بادكم
- Village
- Location within Iran
- Coordinates: 31°13′34″N 49°38′28″E
- Country: Iran
- Province: Khuzestan
- County: Ramhormoz
- Bakhsh: Central
- Rural District: Howmeh-ye Sharqi

Population (2006)
  - Total: 127
- Time zone: UTC+3:30 (IRST)
  - Summer (DST): UTC+4:30 (IRDT)

Badkam (Persian: بادكم, also Romanized as Bādkam) is a village in Howmeh-ye Sharqi Rural District, in the Central District of Ramhormoz County, Khuzestan Province, Iran. At the 2006 census, its population was 127, in 26 families.
