= Zir-e Zard =

Zir-e Zard or Zir Zard (Persian: زيرزرد) may refer to:

- Zir Zard, Fars
- Zir-e Zard, Bagh-e Malek, Khuzestan Province
- Zir-e Zard, Ramhormoz, Khuzestan Province
