= Toghli =

Toghli (Persian: طغلي) may refer to:

- Toghli Alabad
- Toghli Albu Fatileh
- Toghli Sadat
