= Khan Koshteh =

Khan Koshteh خان كشته
- Village
- Location within Iran
- Coordinates: 31°11′58″N 49°38′14″E
- Country: Iran
- Province: Khuzestan
- County: Ramhormoz
- Bakhsh: Central
- Rural District: Howmeh-ye Sharqi

Population (2006)
  - Total: 152
- Time zone: UTC+3:30 (IRST)
  - Summer (DST): UTC+4:30 (IRDT)

Khan Koshteh (Persian: خان كشته, also Romanized as Khān Koshteh) is a village in Howmeh-ye Sharqi Rural District, in the Central District of Ramhormoz County, Khuzestan Province, Iran. At the 2006 census, its population was 152, in 29 families.
