= Mal-e Kayid =

Mal-e Kayid مالكايد
- Village
- Location within Iran
- Coordinates: 31°11′30″N 49°37′09″E
- Country: Iran
- Province: Khuzestan
- County: Ramhormoz
- Bakhsh: Central
- Rural District: Howmeh-ye Sharqi

Population (2006)
  - Total: 367
- Time zone: UTC+3:30 (IRST)
  - Summer (DST): UTC+4:30 (IRDT)

Mal-e Kayid (Persian: مالكايد, also Romanized as Māl-e Kāyīd; also known as Māl-e Qāyed) is a village in Howmeh-ye Sharqi Rural District, in the Central District of Ramhormoz County, Khuzestan Province, Iran. At the 2006 census, its population was 367, in 76 families.
