= Dimeh =

Dimeh (Persian: ديمه) may refer to:

Settlements in Iran:

- Dimeh, Chaharmahal and Bakhtiari
- Dimeh Darb
- Dimeh-ye Ban Said
- Dimeh-ye Karim
- Dimeh-ye Shakraleh
- Dimeh Kuh-e Khayiz

Other places:

- Dimeh es-Seba (Arabic: ديمة السباع), possibly meaning «Dimeh of the lions», the modern name for the archaeological site of Soknopaiou Nesos north of Birket Qarun lake, Egypt
