= Cham Sadat =

Village in Khuzestan province, Iran

Cham Sadat Persian: چم سادات
- Village
- Location within Iran
- Coordinates: 31°16′45″N 49°43′54″E
- Country: Iran
- Province: Khuzestan
- County: Ramhormoz
- District: Central
- Rural District: Howmeh-ye Sharqi

Population (2016)
  - Total: 142
- Time zone: UTC+3:30 (IRST)

Cham Sadat (Persian: چم سادات) (Note: Formerly Cham Lishan (Persian: چم ليشان), also romanized as Cham Līshān; also known as Mulla Abul Hasan) is a village in Howmeh-ye Sharqi Rural District of the Central District of Ramhormoz County, Khuzestan province, Iran.

== Demographics ==
=== Population ===
At the time of the 2006 National Census, the village's population was 124 in 22 households. The following census in 2011 counted 138 people in 32 households. The 2016 census measured the population of the village as 142 people in 40 households.
