= Eyn Korreh =

Eyn Korreh عين كره
- Village
- Location within Iran
- Coordinates: 31°08′35″N 49°33′43″E
- Country: Iran
- Province: Khuzestan
- County: Ramhormoz
- Bakhsh: Central
- Rural District: Howmeh-ye Gharbi

Population (2006)
  - Total: 129
- Time zone: UTC+3:30 (IRST)
  - Summer (DST): UTC+4:30 (IRDT)

Eyn Korreh (Persian: عين كره, also Romanized as ‘Eyn Korreh and Eyn Karreh) is a village in Howmeh-ye Gharbi Rural District, in the Central District of Ramhormoz County, Khuzestan Province, Iran. At the 2006 census, its population was 129, in 26 families.
