= Lapui-ye Do =

Lapui-ye Do لپوئي دو
- Village
- Location within Iran
- Coordinates: 31°11′20″N 49°36′11″E
- Country: Iran
- Province: Khuzestan
- County: Ramhormoz
- Bakhsh: Central
- Rural District: Howmeh-ye Sharqi

Population (2006)
  - Total: 368
- Time zone: UTC+3:30 (IRST)
  - Summer (DST): UTC+4:30 (IRDT)

Lapui-ye Do (Persian: لپوئي دو, also Romanized as Lapū’ī-ye Do; also known as Lapū’ī) is a village in Howmeh-ye Sharqi Rural District, in the Central District of Ramhormoz County, Khuzestan Province, Iran. At the 2006 census, its population was 367, in 75 families.
