= Duri Kal =

Duri Kal دوريكل
- Village
- Location within Iran
- Coordinates: 31°15′44″N 49°39′58″E
- Country: Iran
- Province: Khuzestan
- County: Ramhormoz
- Bakhsh: Central
- Rural District: Howmeh-ye Sharqi

Population (2006)
  - Total: 173
- Time zone: UTC+3:30 (IRST)
  - Summer (DST): UTC+4:30 (IRDT)

Duri Kal (Persian: دوريكل, also Romanized as Dūrī Kal; also known as Daur-i-Kal, Door Kal, and Dūr Kal) is a village in Howmeh-ye Sharqi Rural District, in the Central District of Ramhormoz County, Khuzestan Province, Iran. At the 2006 census, its population was 173, in 36 families.
