= Tang Talkh =

Tang Talkh or Tang-e Talkh (Persian: تنگ تلخ) may refer to:

- Tang Talkh 1
- Tang Talkh 2
- Tang Talkh-e Pagin
- Tang Talkh-e Shomilan
