= Boqeh-ye Do =

Boqeh-ye Do بقعه دو
- Village
- Location within Iran
- Coordinates: 30°59′07″N 49°47′13″E
- Country: Iran
- Province: Khuzestan
- County: Ramhormoz
- Bakhsh: Central
- Rural District: Soltanabad

Population (2006)
  - Total: 146
- Time zone: UTC+3:30 (IRST)
  - Summer (DST): UTC+4:30 (IRDT)

Boqeh-ye Do (Persian: بردخیمه, also Romanized as Boq‘eh-ye Do) is a village in Soltanabad Rural District, in the Central District of Ramhormoz County, Khuzestan Province, Iran. At the 2006 census, its population was 146, in 24 families.
