= Mamatin =

Mamatin or Mamatain or Mamatayn or Mama Tin (Persian: ماماتين) may refer to:

- Mamatin-e Olya
- Mamatin-e Sofla
- Mamatin Rural District, in Rud Zard District, Ramhormoz County, Khuzestan province, Iran
