= Cham Qasemali-ye Yek =

Cham Qasemali-ye Yek چم قاسمعلي يك
- Village
- Location within Iran
- Coordinates: 31°23′11″N 49°45′25″E
- Country: Iran
- Province: Khuzestan
- County: Ramhormoz
- Bakhsh: Central
- Rural District: Howmeh-ye Sharqi

Population (2006)
  - Total: 85
- Time zone: UTC+3:30 (IRST)
  - Summer (DST): UTC+4:30 (IRDT)

Cham Qasemali-ye Yek (Persian: چم قاسمعلي يك, also Romanized as Cham Qāsem‘alī-ye Yek; also known as Cham Qāsem‘alī and Cham Qāsem ‘Alī) is a village in Howmeh-ye Sharqi Rural District, in the Central District of Ramhormoz County, Khuzestan Province, Iran. At the 2006 census, its population was 85, in 17 families.
