= Cham-e Dehqan =

Cham-e Dehqan چم دهقان
- Village
- Location within Iran
- Coordinates: 31°09′26″N 49°34′30″E
- Country: Iran
- Province: Khuzestan
- County: Ramhormoz
- Bakhsh: Central
- Rural District: Howmeh-ye Sharqi

Population (2006)
  - Total: 16
- Time zone: UTC+3:30 (IRST)
  - Summer (DST): UTC+4:30 (IRDT)

Cham-e Dehqan (Persian: چم دهقان, also Romanized as Cham-e Dehqān) is a village in Howmeh-ye Sharqi Rural District, in the Central District of Ramhormoz County, Khuzestan Province, Iran. At the 2006 census, its population was 16, in 4 families.
