= Dehyur =

Dehyur دهيور
- Village
- Location within Iran
- Coordinates: 31°14′54″N 49°39′05″E
- Country: Iran
- Province: Khuzestan
- County: Ramhormoz
- Bakhsh: Central
- Rural District: Howmeh-ye Sharqi

Population (2006)
  - Total: 518
- Time zone: UTC+3:30 (IRST)
  - Summer (DST): UTC+4:30 (IRDT)

Dehyur (Persian: دهيور, also Romanized as Dehyūr) is a village in Howmeh-ye Sharqi Rural District, in the Central District of Ramhormoz County, Khuzestan Province, Iran. At the 2006 census, its population was 518, in 100 families.
