= Rahdar =

Rahdar (Persian: راهدار) may refer to:

- Rahdar, Dashtestan, Bushehr Province
- Rahdar, Hormozgan
- Rahdar, Khuzestan
- Rahdar-e Olya, Khuzestan Province
- Rahdar-e Sofla, Khuzestan Province
- Rahdar Rural District, in Hormozgan Province
