= Hezar Mani-ye Olya =

Hezar Mani-ye Olya هزارمني عليا
- Village
- Location within Iran
- Coordinates: 31°11′18″N 49°34′56″E
- Country: Iran
- Province: Khuzestan
- County: Ramhormoz
- Bakhsh: Central
- Rural District: Howmeh-ye Sharqi

Population (2006)
  - Total: 216
- Time zone: UTC+3:30 (IRST)
  - Summer (DST): UTC+4:30 (IRDT)

Hezar Mani-ye Olya (Persian: هزارمني عليا, also Romanized as Hezār Manī-ye ‘Olyā; also known as Hezār Manī) is a village in Howmeh-ye Sharqi Rural District, in the Central District of Ramhormoz County, Khuzestan Province, Iran. At the 2006 census, its population was 216, in 47 families.
