= Omm ol Emamid =

Omm ol Emamid ام الاماميد
- Village
- Location within Iran
- Coordinates: 31°14′24″N 49°28′12″E
- Country: Iran
- Province: Khuzestan
- County: Ramhormoz
- Bakhsh: Central
- Rural District: Howmeh-ye Gharbi

Population (2006)
  - Total: 55
- Time zone: UTC+3:30 (IRST)
  - Summer (DST): UTC+4:30 (IRDT)

Omm ol Emamid (Persian: ام الاماميد, also Romanized as Omm ol Emāmīd; also known as Omm ol Emāmī) is a village in Howmeh-ye Gharbi Rural District, in the Central District of Ramhormoz County, Khuzestan Province, Iran. At the 2006 census, its population was 55, in 11 families.
