= Pay Risheh Kuh =

Pay Risheh Kuh پاي ريشه كوه
- Village
- Country: Iran
- Province: Khuzestan
- County: Ramhormoz
- Bakhsh: Central
- Rural District: Abolfares

Population (2006)
  - Total: 139
- Time zone: UTC+3:30 (IRST)
  - Summer (DST): UTC+4:30 (IRDT)

Pay Risheh Kuh (Persian: پاي ريشه كوه, also Romanized as Pāy Rīsheh Kūh) is a village in Abolfares Rural District, in the Central District of Ramhormoz County, Khuzestan Province, Iran. At the 2006 census, its population was 139, in 28 families.
