= Shah Abu ol Qasem =

Shah Abu ol Qasem شاه ابوالقاسم
- Village
- Location within Iran
- Coordinates: 31°01′13″N 49°43′45″E
- Country: Iran
- Province: Khuzestan
- County: Ramhormoz
- Bakhsh: Central
- Rural District: Soltanabad

Population (2006)
  - Total: 558
- Time zone: UTC+3:30 (IRST)
  - Summer (DST): UTC+4:30 (IRDT)

Shah Abu ol Qasem (Persian: شاه ابوالقاسم, also Romanized as Shāh Abū ol Qāsem) is a village in Soltanabad Rural District, in the Central District of Ramhormoz County, Khuzestan Province, Iran. At the 2006 census, its population was 558, in 87 families.
