= Cheshmeh Badir =

Cheshmeh Badir چشمه بدير
- Village
- Location within Iran
- Coordinates: 31°08′14″N 49°34′02″E
- Country: Iran
- Province: Khuzestan
- County: Ramhormoz
- Bakhsh: Central
- Rural District: Howmeh-ye Gharbi

Population (2006)
  - Total: 38
- Time zone: UTC+3:30 (IRST)
  - Summer (DST): UTC+4:30 (IRDT)

Cheshmeh Badir (Persian: چشمه بدير, also Romanized as Cheshmeh Badīr; also known as Cheshmeh Bedar) is a village in Howmeh-ye Gharbi Rural District, in the Central District of Ramhormoz County, Khuzestan Province, Iran. At the 2006 census, its population was 38, in 7 families.
