= Gharabad =

Gharabad غراباد
- Village
- Location within Iran
- Coordinates: 31°00′21″N 49°44′48″E
- Country: Iran
- Province: Khuzestan
- County: Ramhormoz
- Bakhsh: Central
- Rural District: Soltanabad

Population (2006)
  - Total: 193
- Time zone: UTC+3:30 (IRST)
  - Summer (DST): UTC+4:30 (IRDT)

Gharabad (Persian: غراباد, also Romanized as Gharābād) is a village in Soltanabad Rural District, in the Central District of Ramhormoz County, Khuzestan Province, Iran. At the 2006 census, its population was 193, in 35 families.
