= Tall-e Zarrini =

Tall-e Zarrini تل زريني
- Village
- Location within Iran
- Coordinates: 31°14′24″N 49°28′12″E
- Country: Iran
- Province: Khuzestan
- County: Ramhormoz
- Bakhsh: Central
- Rural District: Howmeh-ye Gharbi

Population (2006)
  - Total: 66
- Time zone: UTC+3:30 (IRST)
  - Summer (DST): UTC+4:30 (IRDT)

Tall-e Zarrini (Persian: تل زريني, also Romanized as Tall-e Zarrīnī) is a village in Howmeh-ye Gharbi Rural District, in the Central District of Ramhormoz County, Khuzestan Province, Iran. At the 2006 census, its population was 66, in 13 families.
