= Eyn-e Haddad =

Eyn-e Haddad عين حداد
- Village
- Location within Iran
- Coordinates: 31°20′29″N 49°23′50″E
- Country: Iran
- Province: Khuzestan
- County: Ramhormoz
- Bakhsh: Central
- Rural District: Howmeh-ye Gharbi

Population (2006)
  - Total: 187
- Time zone: UTC+3:30 (IRST)
  - Summer (DST): UTC+4:30 (IRDT)

Eyn-e Haddad (Persian: عين حداد, also Romanized as ‘Eyn-e Ḩaddād and ‘Eyn Ḩaddād) is a village in Howmeh-ye Gharbi Rural District, in the Central District of Ramhormoz County, Khuzestan Province, Iran. At the 2006 census, its population was 187, in 28 families.
