= Molla Abdollah =

Molla Abdollah ملاعبداله
- Village
- Location within Iran
- Coordinates: 31°20′27″N 49°30′12″E
- Country: Iran
- Province: Khuzestan
- County: Ramhormoz
- Bakhsh: Central
- Rural District: Howmeh-ye Gharbi

Population (2006)
  - Total: 49
- Time zone: UTC+3:30 (IRST)
  - Summer (DST): UTC+4:30 (IRDT)

Molla Abdollah (Persian: ملاعبداله, also Romanized as Mollā ‘Abdollāh) is a village in Howmeh-ye Gharbi Rural District, in the Central District of Ramhormoz County, Khuzestan Province, Iran. At the 2006 census, its population was 49, in 9 families.
