= Boqeh-ye Yek =

Boqeh-ye Yek بقعه يك
- Village
- Location within Iran
- Coordinates: 30°59′30″N 49°46′23″E
- Country: Iran
- Province: Khuzestan
- County: Ramhormoz
- Bakhsh: Central
- Rural District: Soltanabad

Population (2006)
  - Total: 175
- Time zone: UTC+3:30 (IRST)
  - Summer (DST): UTC+4:30 (IRDT)

Boqeh-ye Yek (Persian: بقعه يك, also Romanized as Boq‘eh-ye Yek) is a village in Soltanabad Rural District, in the Central District of Ramhormoz County, Khuzestan Province, Iran. At the 2006 census, its population was 175, in 29 families.
