= Cham-e Hashem =

Cham-e Hashem چم هاشم
- Village
- Location within Iran
- Coordinates: 31°05′42″N 49°36′54″E
- Country: Iran
- Province: Khuzestan
- County: Ramhormoz
- Bakhsh: Central
- Rural District: Soltanabad

Population (2006)
  - Total: 129
- Time zone: UTC+3:30 (IRST)
  - Summer (DST): UTC+4:30 (IRDT)

Cham-e Hashem (Persian: چم هاشم, also Romanized as Cham-e Hāshem and Cham Hashem; also known as Cham Hāshemī) is a village in Soltanabad Rural District, in the Central District of Ramhormoz County, Khuzestan Province, Iran. At the 2006 census, its population was 129, in 23 families.
