= Tall Barmi =

Tall Barmi تل برمي
- Village
- Location within Iran
- Coordinates: 31°14′28″N 49°35′17″E
- Country: Iran
- Province: Khuzestan
- County: Ramhormoz
- Bakhsh: Central
- Rural District: Howmeh-ye Gharbi

Population (2006)
  - Total: 733
- Time zone: UTC+3:30 (IRST)
  - Summer (DST): UTC+4:30 (IRDT)

Tall Barmi (Persian: تل برمي, also Romanized as Tall Barmī) is a village in Howmeh-ye Gharbi Rural District, in the Central District of Ramhormoz County, Khuzestan Province, Iran.

== Demographics ==
At the 2006 census, its population was 733, in 144 families.
