= Gavdari-ye Hormozi =

Gavdari-ye Hormozi گاوداري هرمزي
- Village
- Country: Iran
- Province: Khuzestan
- County: Ramhormoz
- Bakhsh: Central
- Rural District: Howmeh-ye Gharbi

Population (2006)
  - Total: 16
- Time zone: UTC+3:30 (IRST)
  - Summer (DST): UTC+4:30 (IRDT)

Gavdari-ye Hormozi (Persian: گاوداري هرمزي, also Romanized as Gāvdārī-ye Hormozī) is a village in Howmeh-ye Gharbi Rural District, in the Central District of Ramhormoz County, Khuzestan Province, Iran. At the 2006 census, its population was 16, in 4 families.
