= Morad Beygi =

Morad Beygi مرادبيگي
- Village
- Location within Iran
- Coordinates: 31°11′34″N 49°30′22″E
- Country: Iran
- Province: Khuzestan
- County: Ramhormoz
- Bakhsh: Central
- Rural District: Howmeh-ye Gharbi

Population (2006)
  - Total: 154
- Time zone: UTC+3:30 (IRST)
  - Summer (DST): UTC+4:30 (IRDT)

Morad Beygi (Persian: مرادبيگي, also Romanized as Morād Beygī; also known as Morad Bagi, Morād Begī, and Murād Bogli) is a village in Howmeh-ye Gharbi Rural District, in the Central District of Ramhormoz County, Khuzestan Province, Iran. At the 2006 census, its population was 154, in 31 families.
