= Hajjiabad, Ramhormoz =

Village in Khuzestan province, Iran

Hajjiabad Persian: حاجي اباد
- Village
- Location within Iran
- Country: Iran
- Province: Khuzestan
- County: Ramhormoz
- District: Abolfares
- Rural District: Abolfares

Population (2016)
  - Total: 495
- Time zone: UTC+3:30 (IRST)

Hajjiabad (Persian: حاجي اباد) (Note: Also romanized as Hājī Ābād and Ḩājjīābād) is a village in Abolfares Rural District of Abolfares District, Ramhormoz County, Khuzestan province, Iran.

== Demographics ==
=== Population ===
At the time of the 2006 National Census, the village's population was 723 in 132 households, when it was in the Central District. The following census in 2011 counted 642 people in 137 households. The 2016 census measured the population of the village as 495 people in 136 households, by which time the rural district had been separated from the district in the formation of Abolfares District. It was the most populous village in its rural district.
