= Tall Gesar =

Tall Gesar تل گسر
- Village
- Location within Iran
- Coordinates: 31°21′32″N 49°25′10″E
- Country: Iran
- Province: Khuzestan
- County: Ramhormoz
- Bakhsh: Central
- Rural District: Howmeh-ye Gharbi

Population (2006)
  - Total: 161
- Time zone: UTC+3:30 (IRST)
  - Summer (DST): UTC+4:30 (IRDT)

Tall Gesar (Persian: تل گسر, also Romanized as Tal Gasar and Tal Geser) is a village in Howmeh-ye Gharbi Rural District, in the Central District of Ramhormoz County, Khuzestan Province, Iran. At the 2006 census, its population was 161, in 31 families.
