= Chamum-e Bughar =

Chamum-e Bughar چموم بوغار
- Village
- Location within Iran
- Coordinates: 31°17′52″N 49°18′18″E
- Country: Iran
- Province: Khuzestan
- County: Ramhormoz
- Bakhsh: Central
- Rural District: Howmeh-ye Gharbi

Population (2006)
  - Total: 59
- Time zone: UTC+3:30 (IRST)
  - Summer (DST): UTC+4:30 (IRDT)

Chamum-e Bughar (Persian: چموم بوغار, also Romanized as Chamūm-e Būghār; also known as Būghār, Cham-e Qāẕī, Chamūm-e Yek, and Shākheh-ye Kūpāl-e Do) is a village in Howmeh-ye Gharbi Rural District, in the Central District of Ramhormoz County, Khuzestan Province, Iran. At the 2006 census, its population was 59, in 18 families.
