= Sandali-ye Kanan =

Sandali-ye Kanan صندلي كنعان
- village
- Location within Iran
- Coordinates: 31°10′19″N 49°32′32″E
- Country: Iran
- Province: Khuzestan
- County: Ramhormoz
- Bakhsh: Central
- Rural District: Howmeh-ye Gharbi

Population (2006)
  - Total: 109
- Time zone: UTC+3:30 (IRST)
  - Summer (DST): UTC+4:30 (IRDT)

Sandali-ye Kanan (Persian: صندلي كنعان, also Romanized as Şandalī-ye Kan‘ān; also known as Şandalī-ye Sheykh Kan‘ān) is a village in Howmeh-ye Gharbi Rural District, in the Central District of Ramhormoz County, Khuzestan Province, Iran. At the 2006 census, its population was 109, including 28 families.
