= Tang Talkh-e Pagin =

Tang Talkh-e Pegin تنگ تلخ پگين
- Village
- Location within Iran
- Coordinates: 31°03′59″N 49°50′32″E
- Country: Iran
- Province: Khuzestan
- County: Ramhormoz
- Bakhsh: Central
- Rural District: Soltanabad

Population (2006)
  - Total: 92
- Time zone: UTC+3:30 (IRST)
  - Summer (DST): UTC+4:30 (IRDT)

Tang Talkh-e Pegin (Persian: تنگ تلخ پگين, also Romanized as Tang Talkh-e Pegin and Tang-e Talkh-e Pegīn) is a village in Soltanabad Rural District, in the Central District of Ramhormoz County, Khuzestan Province, Iran. At the 2006 census, its population was 92, in 17 families.
