= Toghli Alabad =

Toghli Alabad طغلي ال عباد
- Village
- Location within Iran
- Coordinates: 31°13′30″N 49°30′17″E
- Country: Iran
- Province: Khuzestan
- County: Ramhormoz
- Bakhsh: Central
- Rural District: Howmeh-ye Gharbi

Population (2006)
  - Total: 348
- Time zone: UTC+3:30 (IRST)
  - Summer (DST): UTC+4:30 (IRDT)

Toghli Alabad (Persian: طغلي ال عباد, also Romanized as Ţoghlī Ālābād; also known as Ţoghlī and Toqlī Ālābād) is a village in Howmeh-ye Gharbi Rural District, in the Central District of Ramhormoz County, Khuzestan Province, Iran. At the 2006 census, its legal population was 348, in 55 families.
