= Marbacheh =

Village in Khuzestan province, Iran

Marbacheh Persian: مربچه
- Village
- Location within Iran
- Coordinates: 31°16′07″N 49°25′54″E
- Country: Iran
- Province: Khuzestan
- County: Ramhormoz
- District: Central
- Rural District: Howmeh-ye Gharbi

Population (2016)
  - Total: 849
- Time zone: UTC+3:30 (IRST)

Marbacheh (Persian: مربچه) (Note: Also known as Marbachcheh, Mirbācheh, and Mīrpācheh) is a village in, and the capital of, Howmeh-ye Gharbi Rural District of the Central District of Ramhormoz County, Khuzestan province, Iran.

== Demographics ==
=== Population ===
At the time of the 2006 National Census, the village's population was 917 in 200 households. The following census in 2011 counted 822 people in 206 households. The 2016 census measured the population of the village as 849 people in 236 households. It was the most populous village in its rural district.
