= Pagach =

Pagach or Pa Gach (Persian: پاگچ) may refer to:

== Places ==
- Pagach, Chaharmahal and Bakhtiari
- Pagach, Khuzestan
- Pa Gach-e Lahbari, Khuzestan Province
- Pa Gach-e Kal Jamshid, Kohgiluyeh and Boyer-Ahmad Province

== Other users ==
- Pagach (food), a Lenten dish

== See also ==
- Pagachi (disambiguation)
