= Dimeh-ye Karim =

Dimeh-ye Karim ديمه كريم
- Village
- Location within Iran
- Coordinates: 31°07′12″N 49°35′11″E
- Country: Iran
- Province: Khuzestan
- County: Ramhormoz
- Bakhsh: Central
- Rural District: Howmeh-ye Gharbi

Population (2006)
  - Total: 41
- Time zone: UTC+3:30 (IRST)
  - Summer (DST): UTC+4:30 (IRDT)

Dimeh-ye Karim (Persian: ديمه كريم, also Romanized as Dīmeh-ye Karīm; also known as Dīmeh) is a village in Howmeh-ye Gharbi Rural District, in the Central District of Ramhormoz County, Khuzestan Province, Iran. At the 2006 census, its population was 41, in 7 families.
