= Sar Cheshmeh-ye Sofla =

Sar Cheshmeh-ye Sofla سرچشمه سفلي
- Village
- Location within Iran
- Coordinates: 31°18′29″N 49°34′47″E
- Country: Iran
- Province: Khuzestan
- County: Ramhormoz
- Bakhsh: Central
- Rural District: Howmeh-ye Gharbi

Population (2006)
  - Total: 210
- Time zone: UTC+3:30 (IRST)
  - Summer (DST): UTC+4:30 (IRDT)

Sar Cheshmeh-ye Sofla (Persian: سرچشمه سفلي, also Romanized as Sar Cheshmeh-ye Soflá) is a village in Howmeh-ye Gharbi Rural District, in the Central District of Ramhormoz County, Khuzestan Province, Iran. At the 2006 census, its population was 210, in 49 families.
