= Darvishan, Khuzestan =

Darvishan درويشان
- Village
- Location within Iran
- Coordinates: 31°16′57″N 49°38′55″E
- Country: Iran
- Province: Khuzestan
- County: Ramhormoz
- Bakhsh: Central
- Rural District: Howmeh-ye Gharbi

Population (2006)
  - Total: 64
- Time zone: UTC+3:30 (IRST)
  - Summer (DST): UTC+4:30 (IRDT)

Darvishan (Persian: درويشان, also Romanized as Darvīshān) is a village in Howmeh-ye Gharbi Rural District, in the Central District of Ramhormoz County, Khuzestan Province, Iran. At the 2006 census, its population was 64, in 12 families.
