= Mamatin-e Sofla =

Mamatin-e Sofla ماماتين سفلي
- Village
- Location within Iran
- Coordinates: 31°19′11″N 49°45′36″E
- Country: Iran
- Province: Khuzestan
- County: Ramhormoz
- Bakhsh: Central
- Rural District: Howmeh-ye Sharqi

Population (2006)
  - Total: 172
- Time zone: UTC+3:30 (IRST)
  - Summer (DST): UTC+4:30 (IRDT)

Mamatin-e Sofla (Persian: ماماتين سفلي, also Romanized as Māmātīn-e Soflá; also known as Māmātain, Māmātain-e Pā’īn, Māmātayn-e Pā’īn, Māmātīn, Māmā Tīn-e Pā’īn, and Mamatīnī) is a village in Howmeh-ye Sharqi Rural District, in the Central District of Ramhormoz County, Khuzestan Province, Iran. At the 2006 census, its population was 172, in 32 families.
