= Darvishan-e Yek =

Darvishan-e Yek درويشان يك
- Village
- Location within Iran
- Coordinates: 31°20′03″N 49°31′17″E
- Country: Iran
- Province: Khuzestan
- County: Ramhormoz
- Bakhsh: Central
- Rural District: Howmeh-ye Sharqi

Population (2006)
  - Total: 51
- Time zone: UTC+3:30 (IRST)
  - Summer (DST): UTC+4:30 (IRDT)

Darvishan-e Yek (Persian: درويشان يك, also Romanized as Darvīshān-e Yek; also known as Darvīshā and Darvīshān-e ‘Arīyeẕ) is a village in Howmeh-ye Sharqi Rural District, in the Central District of Ramhormoz County, Khuzestan Province, Iran. According to the 2006 census, its population was 51, in 11 families.
