= Bayman Sadat =

Bayman Sadat بايمان سادات
- Village
- Location within Iran
- Coordinates: 31°15′20″N 49°38′47″E
- Country: Iran
- Province: Khuzestan
- County: Ramhormoz
- Bakhsh: Central
- Rural District: Howmeh-ye Sharqi

Population (2006)
  - Total: 241
- Time zone: UTC+3:30 (IRST)
  - Summer (DST): UTC+4:30 (IRDT)

Bayman Sadat (Persian: بايمان سادات, also Romanized as Bāymān Sādāt) is a village in Howmeh-ye Sharqi Rural District, in the Central District of Ramhormoz County, Khuzestan Province, Iran. At the 2006 census, its population was 241, in 56 families.
