= Kohleh =

Kohleh (Persian: كهله) may refer to:

- Kohleh 1
- Kohleh 2
