= Dimeh-ye Ban Said =

Dimeh-ye Ban Said ديمه بن سعيد
- Village
- Location within Iran
- Coordinates: 31°07′31″N 49°34′45″E
- Country: Iran
- Province: Khuzestan
- County: Ramhormoz
- Bakhsh: Central
- Rural District: Howmeh-ye Gharbi

Population (2006)
  - Total: 34
- Time zone: UTC+3:30 (IRST)
  - Summer (DST): UTC+4:30 (IRDT)

Dimeh-ye Ban Said (Persian: ديمه بن سعيد, also Romanized as Dīmeh-ye Ban Saʿīd; also known as Dīmeh-ye Banīsaeed) is a village in Howmeh-ye Gharbi Rural District, in the Central District of Ramhormoz County, Khuzestan Province, Iran. At the 2006 census, its population was 34, in 9 families.
