= Sar Kuhaki =

Sar Kuhaki (Persian: سركوهكي) may refer to:

- Sar Kuhaki, Khuzestan
- Sar Kuhaki, Kohgiluyeh and Boyer-Ahmad
