= Rahdar-e Sofla =

Rahdar-e Sofla راهدارسفلي
- Village
- Location within Iran
- Coordinates: 31°17′16″N 49°33′53″E
- Country: Iran
- Province: Khuzestan
- County: Ramhormoz
- Bakhsh: Central
- Rural District: Howmeh-ye Gharbi

Population (2006)
  - Total: 111
- Time zone: UTC+3:30 (IRST)
  - Summer (DST): UTC+4:30 (IRDT)

Rahdar-e Sofla (Persian: راهدارسفلي, also Romanized as Rāhdār-e Soflá) is a village in Howmeh-ye Gharbi Rural District, in the Central District of Ramhormoz County, Khuzestan Province, Iran. At the 2006 census, its population was 111, in 27 families.
