= Kal Mohammad Hoseyn =

Kal Mohammad Hoseyn كل محمدحسين
- Village
- Location within Iran
- Coordinates: 31°16′18″N 49°39′21″E
- Country: Iran
- Province: Khuzestan
- County: Ramhormoz
- Bakhsh: Central
- Rural District: Howmeh-ye Sharqi

Population (2006)
  - Total: 109
- Time zone: UTC+3:30 (IRST)
  - Summer (DST): UTC+4:30 (IRDT)

Kal Mohammad Hoseyn (Persian: كل محمدحسين, also Romanized as Kal Moḩammad Ḩoseyn and Kal Mohammad Hosein; also known as Kūlī Moḩammad Ḩoseyn) is a village in Howmeh-ye Sharqi Rural District, in the Central District of Ramhormoz County, Khuzestan Province, Iran. At the 2006 census, its population was 109, in 24 families.
