= Zaraqoli-ye Pain =

Zaraqoli-ye Pain زراقلي پايين
- Village
- Location within Iran
- Coordinates: 31°15′00″N 49°31′00″E
- Country: Iran
- Province: Khuzestan
- County: Ramhormoz
- Bakhsh: Central
- Rural District: Howmeh-ye Gharbi

Population (2006)
  - Total: 454
- Time zone: UTC+3:30 (IRST)
  - Summer (DST): UTC+4:30 (IRDT)

Zaraqoli-ye Pain (Persian: زراقلي پايين, also Romanized as Zarāqolī-ye Pā’īn; also known as Zarāqolī-ye Soflá) is a village in Howmeh-ye Gharbi Rural District, in the Central District of Ramhormoz County, Khuzestan Province, Iran. At the 2006 census, its population was 454, in 90 families.
