= Pagin, Iran =

Pegin پگين
- Village
- Location within Iran
- Coordinates: 31°05′41″N 49°50′28″E
- Country: Iran
- Province: Khuzestan
- County: Ramhormoz
- Bakhsh: Central
- Rural District: Soltanabad

Population (2006)
  - Total: 33
- Time zone: UTC+3:30 (IRST)
  - Summer (DST): UTC+4:30 (IRDT)

Pegin (Persian: پگين, also Romanized as Pegin) is a village in Soltanabad Rural District, in the Central District of Ramhormoz County, Khuzestan Province, Iran. At the 2006 census, its population was 33, in 7 families.
