= Sandali (disambiguation) =

Sandali is a place in Tanzania.

Sandali may also refer to:

- Sandali (Mrld song), 2024
- Sandali (Cup of Joe song), 2025
- Sandali-ye Gav Mishi, Iran
- Sandali-ye Kanan, Iran
