= Zoveydi-ye Musa =

Zoveydi-ye Musa زويدي موسي
- Village
- Location within Iran
- Coordinates: 31°08′13″N 49°35′57″E
- Country: Iran
- Province: Khuzestan
- County: Ramhormoz
- Bakhsh: Central
- Rural District: Howmeh-ye Sharqi

Population (2006)
  - Total: 109
- Time zone: UTC+3:30 (IRST)
  - Summer (DST): UTC+4:30 (IRDT)

Zoveydi-ye Musa (Persian: زويدي موسي, also Romanized as Zoveydī-ye Mūsá; also known as Zobeydī-ye Mūsá, Zobīdī, Zobīdī-ye Mūsá, and Zoveydī) is a village in Howmeh-ye Sharqi Rural District, in the Central District of Ramhormoz County, Khuzestan Province, Iran. At the 2006 census, its population was 109, in 28 families.
