= Ghoveyleh-ye Sadat =

Ghoveyleh-ye Sadat غويله سادات
- Village
- Location within Iran
- Coordinates: 31°18′18″N 49°28′18″E
- Country: Iran
- Province: Khuzestan
- County: Ramhormoz
- Bakhsh: Central
- Rural District: Howmeh-ye Gharbi

Population (2006)
  - Total: 316
- Time zone: UTC+3:30 (IRST)
  - Summer (DST): UTC+4:30 (IRDT)

Ghoveyleh-ye Sadat (Persian: غويله سادات, also Romanized as Ghoveyleh-ye Sādāt; also known as Tall-e Qoveyleh and Tall Qaveyleh) is a village in Howmeh-ye Gharbi Rural District, in the Central District of Ramhormoz County, Khuzestan Province, Iran. At the 2006 census, its population was 316, in 61 families.
