= Ghoveyleh =

Ghoveyleh (Persian: غويله) may refer to:

- Ghoveyleh-ye Naqed
- Ghoveyleh-ye Sadat
