= Kuli Rostam =

Kuli Rostam كولي رستم
- Village
- Location within Iran
- Coordinates: 31°16′11″N 49°39′04″E
- Country: Iran
- Province: Khuzestan
- County: Ramhormoz
- Bakhsh: Central
- Rural District: Howmeh-ye Sharqi

Population (2006)
  - Total: 91
- Time zone: UTC+3:30 (IRST)
  - Summer (DST): UTC+4:30 (IRDT)

Kuli Rostam (Persian: كولي رستم, also Romanized as Kūlī Rostam) is a village in Howmeh-ye Sharqi Rural District, in the Central District of Ramhormoz County, Khuzestan Province, Iran. At the 2006 census, its population was 91, in 18 families.
