= Do Gacheh =

Do Gacheh or Dugacheh (Persian: دوگچه) may refer to:

- Do Gacheh, Bagh-e Malek
- Do Gacheh, Ramhormoz
