= Bayman, Iran =

Bayman (Persian: بايمان), in Iran, may refer to:

- Bayman-e Ariyez
- Bayman Sadat
