= Kohleh-ye Yek =

Kohleh-ye Yek كهله يك
- Village
- Location within Iran
- Coordinates: 30°58′25″N 49°48′22″E
- Country: Iran
- Province: Khuzestan
- County: Ramhormoz
- Bakhsh: Central
- Rural District: Soltanabad

Population (2006)
  - Total: 444
- Time zone: UTC+3:30 (IRST)
  - Summer (DST): UTC+4:30 (IRDT)

Kohleh-ye Yek (Persian: كهله يك; also known as Kohleh) is a village in Soltanabad Rural District, in the Central District of Ramhormoz County, Khuzestan Province, Iran. At the 2006 census, its population was 444, in 70 families.
