= Zaraqoli =

Zaraqoli (Persian: زراقلي) may refer to:

- Zaraqoli-ye Bala
- Zaraqoli-ye Pain
