= Dimeh-ye Shakraleh =

Dimeh-ye Shakraleh ديمه شكراله
- Village
- Location within Iran
- Coordinates: 31°07′46″N 49°34′25″E
- Country: Iran
- Province: Khuzestan
- County: Ramhormoz
- Bakhsh: Central
- Rural District: Howmeh-ye Gharbi

Population (2006)
  - Total: 73
- Time zone: UTC+3:30 (IRST)
  - Summer (DST): UTC+4:30 (IRDT)

Dimeh-ye Shakraleh (Persian: ديمه شكراله, also Romanized as Dīmeh-ye Shaḵrāleh; also known as Dīmeh-ye Shargelar) is a village in Howmeh-ye Gharbi Rural District, in the Central District of Ramhormoz County, Khuzestan Province, Iran. At the 2006 census, its population was 73, in 16 families.
