= Tang Talkh-e Yek =

Tang Talkh-e Yek تنگ تلخ يك
- Village
- Location within Iran
- Coordinates: 31°02′49″N 49°55′50″E
- Country: Iran
- Province: Khuzestan
- County: Ramhormoz
- Bakhsh: Central
- Rural District: Abolfares

Population (2006)
  - Total: 56
- Time zone: UTC+3:30 (IRST)
  - Summer (DST): UTC+4:30 (IRDT)

Tang Talkh-e Yek (Persian: تنگ تلخ يك; also known as Tang-e Talkh) is a village in Abolfares Rural District, in the Central District of Ramhormoz County, Khuzestan Province, Iran. At the 2006 census, its population was 56, in 10 families.
