= Ghoveyleh-ye Naqed =

Ghoveyleh-ye Naqed غويله ناقد
- Village
- Location within Iran
- Coordinates: 31°16′47″N 49°30′51″E
- Country: Iran
- Province: Khuzestan
- County: Ramhormoz
- Bakhsh: Central
- Rural District: Howmeh-ye Gharbi

Population (2006)
  - Total: 134
- Time zone: UTC+3:30 (IRST)
  - Summer (DST): UTC+4:30 (IRDT)

Ghoveyleh-ye Naqed (Persian: غويله ناقد, also Romanized as Ghoveyleh-ye Nāqed) is a village in Howmeh-ye Gharbi Rural District, in the Central District of Ramhormoz County, Khuzestan Province, Iran. At the 2006 census, its population was 134, in 29 families.
