= Mamatin-e Olya =

Mamatin-e Olya ماماتين عليا
- Village
- Location within Iran
- Coordinates: 31°18′29″N 49°46′01″E
- Country: Iran
- Province: Khuzestan
- County: Ramhormoz
- Bakhsh: Central
- Rural District: Howmeh-ye Sharqi

Population (2006)
  - Total: 98
- Time zone: UTC+3:30 (IRST)
  - Summer (DST): UTC+4:30 (IRDT)

Mamatin-e Olya (Persian: ماماتين عليا, also Romanized as Māmātīn-e ‘Olyā; also known as Māmātayn-e Bālā, Māmātin, and Māmātīn-e Bālā) is a village in Howmeh-ye Sharqi Rural District, in the Central District of Ramhormoz County, Khuzestan Province, Iran. At the 2006 census, its population was 98, in 20 families.
