= Jokanak =

Jokanak جوكنك
- Village
- Location within Iran
- Coordinates: 31°20′28″N 49°43′28″E
- Country: Iran
- Province: Khuzestan
- County: Ramhormoz
- Bakhsh: Central
- Rural District: Howmeh-ye Sharqi

Population (2006)
  - Total: 152
- Time zone: UTC+3:30 (IRST)
  - Summer (DST): UTC+4:30 (IRDT)

Jokanak (Persian: جوكنك) is a village in Howmeh-ye Sharqi Rural District, in the Central District of Ramhormoz County, Khuzestan Province, Iran. At the 2006 census, its population was 152, in 24 families. Jokanak is one of the oldest villages in Ramhormoz.

JoKanak bridge is located in Jokanak village, 6 kilometers from Rudzard and 22 kilometers from Ramhormoz city. The bridge was established in 1370. Its colour is rusty bronze. The foundations of this bridge are 5 meters below the ground.

The local dialect of Jow Kanak is a dialect of the Lori language.
