= Rud Zard =

Rud Zard or Rud-e Zard (Persian: رودزرد) may refer to:

- Rud Zard-e Kayed Rafi, a village in Rud Zard Rural District, Iran
- Rud Zard-e Mashin, a village in Howmeh-ye Sharqi Rural District, Iran
- Rud Zard District, in Ramhormoz County, Khuzestan province
- Rud Zard Rural District, in the Central District, Bagh-e Malek County, Khuzestan province
