= Zaraqoli-ye Bala =

Zaraqoli-ye Bala زراقلي بالا
- Village
- Location within Iran
- Coordinates: 31°15′00″N 49°31′00″E
- Country: Iran
- Province: Khuzestan
- County: Ramhormoz
- Bakhsh: Central
- Rural District: Howmeh-ye Gharbi

Population (2006)
  - Total: 242
- Time zone: UTC+3:30 (IRST)
  - Summer (DST): UTC+4:30 (IRDT)

Zaraqoli-ye Bala (Persian: زراقلي بالا, also Romanized as Zarāqolī-ye Bālā; also known as Zarāqolī-ye ‘Olyā) is a village in Howmeh-ye Gharbi Rural District, in the Central District of Ramhormoz County, Khuzestan Province, Iran. At the 2006 census, its population was 242, in 45 families.
