= Zir-e Zard, Ramhormoz =

Zir-e Zard زيرزرد
- Village
- Location within Iran
- Coordinates: 31°15′24″N 49°40′44″E
- Country: Iran
- Province: Khuzestan
- County: Ramhormoz
- Bakhsh: Central
- Rural District: Howmeh-ye Sharqi

Population (2006)
  - Total: 279
- Time zone: UTC+3:30 (IRST)
  - Summer (DST): UTC+4:30 (IRDT)

Zir-e Zard (Persian: زيرزرد, also Romanized as Zīr-e Zard and Zir Zard; also known as Zīr-e Zard Boneh, Zīr Zard Boneh, and Zīr Zardineh) is a village in Howmeh-ye Sharqi Rural District, in the Central District of Ramhormoz County, Khuzestan Province, Iran. At the 2006 census, its population was 279, in 55 families.
