= Magah Taneh =

Magah Taneh (Persian: مگه تنه) may refer to:

- Magah Taneh Abul
- Magah Taneh Morad
