= Bayman-e Ariyez =

Bayman-e Ariyez بايمان عريض
- Village
- Location within Iran
- Coordinates: 31°18′50″N 49°33′54″E
- Country: Iran
- Province: Khuzestan
- County: Ramhormoz
- Bakhsh: Central
- Rural District: Howmeh-ye Gharbi

Population (2006)
  - Total: 93
- Time zone: UTC+3:30 (IRST)
  - Summer (DST): UTC+4:30 (IRDT)

Bayman-e Ariyez (Persian: بايمان عريض, also Romanized as Bāymān-e ‘Arīyeẕ; also known as Bāymān) is a village in Howmeh-ye Gharbi Rural District, in the Central District of Ramhormoz County, Khuzestan Province, Iran. At the 2006 census, its population was 93, in 27 families.
