= Do Gacheh, Ramhormoz =

Do Gacheh دوگچه
- Village
- Location within Iran
- Coordinates: 31°09′43″N 49°49′08″E
- Country: Iran
- Province: Khuzestan
- County: Ramhormoz
- Bakhsh: Central
- Rural District: Abolfares

Population (2006)
  - Total: 28
- Time zone: UTC+3:30 (IRST)
  - Summer (DST): UTC+4:30 (IRDT)

Do Gacheh (Persian: دوگچه) is a village in Abolfares Rural District, in the Central District of Ramhormoz County, Khuzestan Province, Iran. At the 2006 census, its population was 28, in 9 families.
