= Tang Talkh-e Shomilan =

Tang Talkh-e 2( Bala) تنگ تلخ بالا
- Village
- Location within Iran
- Coordinates: 31°04′40″N 49°51′03″E
- Country: Iran
- Province: Khuzestan
- County: Ramhormoz
- Bakhsh: Central
- Rural District: Abolfares

Population (2006)
  - Total: 76
- Time zone: UTC+3:30 (IRST)
  - Summer (DST): UTC+4:30 (IRDT)

Tang Talkh-e 2 ( Bala) (Persian: تنگ تلخ بالا, also Romanized as Tang Talkh-e Bala; also known as Tang-e Talkh 2) is a village in Abolfares Rural District, in the Central District of Ramhormoz County, Khuzestan Province, Iran. At the 2006 census, its population was 76, in 14 families.
