= Rostamabad Rural District =

Rural district in Khuzestan province, Iran

Rostamabad Rural District Persian: دهستان رستم‌آباد
- Rural District
- Location within Iran
- Coordinates: 31°08′55″N 49°42′23″E
- Country: Iran
- Province: Khuzestan
- County: Ramhormoz
- District: Soltanabad
- Capital: Rostamabad

Population (2016)
  - Total: 3,610
- Time zone: UTC+3:30 (IRST)

Rostamabad Rural District Persian: دهستان رستم‌آباد is in Soltanabad District of Ramhormoz County, Khuzestan, Iran. Its capital is the village of Rostamabad.

== History ==
Following the 2011 National Census, Soltanabad Rural District was separated from the Central District during the establishment of Soltanabad District, and Rostamabad Rural District was created within the new district.

== Demographics ==
=== Population ===
According to the 2016 census, the rural district had a population of 3,610 residents living in 1,037 households. Among its 22 villages, the most populous was Rostamabad, with a population of 706.
