= Jereh Rural District (Ramhormoz County) =

Rural district in Khuzestan province, Iran

Jereh Rural District Persian: دهستان جره
- Rural District
- Location within Iran
- Coordinates: 31°24′10″N 49°42′55″E
- Country: Iran
- Province: Khuzestan
- County: Ramhormoz
- District: Rud Zard
- Capital: Rud Zard-e Mashin

Population (2016)
  - Total: 2,898
- Time zone: UTC+3:30 (IRST)

Jereh Rural District (Persian: دهستان جره) is in Rud Zard District of Ramhormoz County, Khuzestan province, Iran. It is administered from the city of Rud Zard-e Mashin.

== History ==
After the 2011 National Census, villages were separated from the Central District in the formation of Rud Zard District, and Jereh Rural District was created in the new district.

== Demographics ==
=== Population ===
At the time of the 2016 census, the rural district's population was 2,898 in 748 households. The most populous of its 13 villages was Rud Zard-e Mashin (now a city), with 2,252 people.
