= Zoveydi-ye Ramezan =

Zoveydi-ye Ramezan زويدي رمضان
- Village
- Location within Iran
- Coordinates: 31°08′14″N 49°35′19″E
- Country: Iran
- Province: Khuzestan
- County: Ramhormoz
- Bakhsh: Central
- Rural District: Howmeh-ye Sharqi

Population (2006)
  - Total: 91
- Time zone: UTC+3:30 (IRST)
  - Summer (DST): UTC+4:30 (IRDT)

Zoveydi-ye Ramezan (Persian: زويدي رمضان, also Romanized as Zoveydī-ye Rameẕān; also known as Zobeydī-ye Rameẕān) is a village in Howmeh-ye Sharqi Rural District, in the Central District of Ramhormoz County, Khuzestan Province, Iran. At the 2006 census, its population was 91, in 21 families.
