= Basadi-ye Sofla =

Basadi-ye Sofla باصدي سفلي
- Village
- Location within Iran
- Coordinates: 31°10′45″N 49°34′16″E
- Country: Iran
- Province: Khuzestan
- County: Ramhormoz
- Bakhsh: Central
- Rural District: Howmeh-ye Sharqi

Population (2006)
  - Total: 139
- Time zone: UTC+3:30 (IRST)
  - Summer (DST): UTC+4:30 (IRDT)

Basadi-ye Sofla (Persian: باصدي سفلي, also Romanized as Bāşadī-ye Soflá; also known as Bāşadī-ye Pā’īn, Basedi, Bāşedī-ye Shahreyārī, and Bāşedī-ye Shahrīārī) is a village in Howmeh-ye Sharqi Rural District, in the Central District of Ramhormoz County, Khuzestan Province, Iran. At the 2006 census, its population was 139, in 30 families.
