= Rahdar-e Olya =

Rahdar-e Olya راهدارعليا
- Village
- Location within Iran
- Coordinates: 31°17′21″N 49°34′12″E
- Country: Iran
- Province: Khuzestan
- County: Ramhormoz
- Bakhsh: Central
- Rural District: Howmeh-ye Gharbi

Population (2006)
  - Total: 16
- Time zone: UTC+3:30 (IRST)
  - Summer (DST): UTC+4:30 (IRDT)

Rahdar-e Olya (Persian: راهدارعليا, also Romanized as Rāhdār-ye ‘Olyā; also known as Rāhdār and Rāhdār-e Bālā) is a village in Howmeh-ye Gharbi Rural District, in the Central District of Ramhormoz County, Khuzestan Province, Iran. At the 2006 census, its population was 16, in 4 families.
