= Kohleh-ye Do =

Kohleh-ye Do كهله دو
- Village
- Location within Iran
- Coordinates: 30°58′09″N 49°48′12″E
- Country: Iran
- Province: Khuzestan
- County: Ramhormoz
- Bakhsh: Central
- Rural District: Soltanabad

Population (2006)
  - Total: 350
- Time zone: UTC+3:30 (IRST)
  - Summer (DST): UTC+4:30 (IRDT)

Kohleh-ye Do (Persian: كهله دو; also known as Kohleh) is a village in Soltanabad Rural District, in the Central District of Ramhormoz County, Khuzestan Province, Iran. At the 2006 census, its population was 350, in 59 families.
