= Zoveydi-ye Maghamez =

Zoveydi-ye Maghamez زويدي مغامز
- Village
- Location within Iran
- Coordinates: 31°08′57″N 49°34′48″E
- Country: Iran
- Province: Khuzestan
- County: Ramhormoz
- Bakhsh: Central
- Rural District: Howmeh-ye Sharqi

Population (2006)
  - Total: 370
- Time zone: UTC+3:30 (IRST)
  - Summer (DST): UTC+4:30 (IRDT)

Zoveydi-ye Maghamez (Persian: زويدي مغامز, also Romanized as Zoveydī-ye Maghāmez; also known as Zobeydī-ye Maqāmes) is a village in Howmeh-ye Sharqi Rural District, in the Central District of Ramhormoz County, Khuzestan Province, Iran. At the 2006 census, its population was 370, in 76 families.
