= Toghli Sadat =

Toghli Sadat طغلي سادات
- Village
- Location within Iran
- Coordinates: 31°14′05″N 49°32′57″E
- Country: Iran
- Province: Khuzestan
- County: Ramhormoz
- Bakhsh: Central
- Rural District: Howmeh-ye Gharbi

Population (2006)
  - Total: 245
- Time zone: UTC+3:30 (IRST)
  - Summer (DST): UTC+4:30 (IRDT)

Toghli Sadat (Persian: طغلي سادات, also Romanized as Ţoghlī Sādāt; also known as Toqlī Sādāt) is a village in Howmeh-ye Gharbi Rural District, in the Central District of Ramhormoz County, Khuzestan Province, Iran. At the 2006 census, its population was 245, in 41 families.
