= Toghli Albu Fatileh =

Toghli Albu Fatileh طغلي البوفتيله
- Village
- Country: Iran
- Province: Khuzestan
- County: Ramhormoz
- Bakhsh: Central
- Rural District: Howmeh-ye Gharbi

Population (2006)
  - Total: 112
- Time zone: UTC+3:30 (IRST)
  - Summer (DST): UTC+4:30 (IRDT)

Toghli Albu Fatileh (Persian: طغلي البوفتيله, also romanized as Ţoghlī Ālbū Fatīleh) is a village in Howmeh-ye Gharbi Rural District, in the Central District of Ramhormoz County, Khuzestan Province, Iran. At the 2006 census, its population was 112, in 18 families.
