= Sar Kahaki =

Sar Kahaki سركهكي
- Village
- Location within Iran
- Coordinates: 31°16′53″N 49°37′50″E
- Country: Iran
- Province: Khuzestan
- County: Ramhormoz
- Bakhsh: Central
- Rural District: Howmeh-ye Sharqi

Population (2006)
  - Total: 522
- Time zone: UTC+3:30 (IRST)
  - Summer (DST): UTC+4:30 (IRDT)

Sar Kahaki (Persian: سركهكي, also Romanized as Sar Kahakī; also known as Kūhakī and Sar Kūhakī) is a village in Howmeh-ye Sharqi Rural District, in the Central District of Ramhormoz County, Khuzestan Province, Iran. At the 2006 census, its population was 522, in 109 families.
