= Basadi-ye Olya =

Basadi-ye Olya باصدي عليا
- Village
- Location within Iran
- Coordinates: 31°11′08″N 49°33′27″E
- Country: Iran
- Province: Khuzestan
- County: Ramhormoz
- Bakhsh: Central
- Rural District: Howmeh-ye Sharqi

Population (2006)
  - Total: 201
- Time zone: UTC+3:30 (IRST)
  - Summer (DST): UTC+4:30 (IRDT)

Basadi-ye Olya (Persian: باصدي عليا, also Romanized as Bāşadī-ye ‘Olyā) is a village in Howmeh-ye Sharqi Rural District, in the Central District of Ramhormoz County, Khuzestan Province, Iran. At the 2006 census, its population was 201, in 39 families.
