= Pagachi-ye Bahmai =

Village in Khuzestan, Iran

Pagachi-ye Bahmai پاگچي بهمئي
- Village
- Location within Iran
- Coordinates: 31°17′35″N 49°36′23″E
- Country: Iran
- Province: Khuzestan
- County: Ramhormoz
- Bakhsh: Central
- Rural District: Howmeh-ye Sharqi

Population (2006)
  - Total: 1,614
- Time zone: UTC+3:30 (IRST)
  - Summer (DST): UTC+4:30 (IRDT)

Pagachi-ye Bahmai (Persian: پاگچي بهمئي, also Romanized as Pāgachī-ye Bahma’ī; also known as Pā Gachī and Pā Gachī Bahman) is a village in Howmeh-ye Sharqi Rural District, in the Central District of Ramhormoz County, Khuzestan Province, Iran. At the 2006 census, its population was 1,614, in 330 families.
