= Tang Talkh-e Do =

Tang Talkh-e Do تنگ تلخ دو
- Village
- Location within Iran
- Coordinates: 31°03′59″N 49°50′28″E
- Country: Iran
- Province: Khuzestan
- County: Ramhormoz
- Bakhsh: Central
- Rural District: Abolfares

Population (2006)
  - Total: 124
- Time zone: UTC+3:30 (IRST)
  - Summer (DST): UTC+4:30 (IRDT)

Tang Talkh-e Do (Persian: تنگ تلخ دو; also known as Tang Talkh) is a village in Abolfares Rural District, in the Central District of Ramhormoz County, Khuzestan Province, Iran. At the 2006 census, its population was 124, in 25 families.
