= Sar Kuraki =

Sar Kuraki or Sarkuraki (Persian: سركوركي) may refer to:

- Sar Kuraki-ye Deli Rich-e Olya
- Sarkuraki-ye Sefidar
