= Seh Tolun Rural District =

Rural district in Khuzestan province, Iran

Seh Tolun Rural District Persian: دهستان سه تلون
- Rural District
- Location within Iran
- Coordinates: 31°11′28″N 49°52′49″E
- Country: Iran
- Province: Khuzestan
- County: Ramhormoz
- District: Abolfares
- Capital: Seh Tolun

Population (2016)
  - Total: 3,107
- Time zone: UTC+3:30 (IRST)

Seh Tolun Rural District (Persian: دهستان سه تلون) is in Abolfares District of Ramhormoz County, Khuzestan province, Iran. Its capital is the village of Seh Tolun.

== History ==
After the 2011 National Census, Abolfares Rural District was separated from the Central District in the formation of Abolfares District, and Seh Tolun Rural District was created in the new district.

== Demographics ==
=== Population ===
At the time of the 2016 census, the rural district's population was 3,107 in 794 households. The most populous of its eight villages was Darreh Tu Nem Nemi, with 1,257 people.
