= Sandali-ye Gav Mishi =

Sandali-ye Gav Mishi صندلي گاوميشي
- Village
- Location within Iran
- Coordinates: 31°12′00″N 49°34′00″E
- Country: Iran
- Province: Khuzestan
- County: Ramhormoz
- Bakhsh: Central
- Rural District: Howmeh-ye Gharbi

Population (2006)
  - Total: 364
- Time zone: UTC+3:30 (IRST)
  - Summer (DST): UTC+4:30 (IRDT)

Sandali-ye Gav Mishi (Persian: صندلي گاوميشي, also Romanized as Şandalī-ye Gāv Mīshī) is a village in Howmeh-ye Gharbi Rural District, in the Central District of Ramhormoz County, Khuzestan Province, Iran. At the 2006 census, its population was 364, in 66 families.
