= Coulee (disambiguation) =

Coulee is a type of valley or drainage zone.

Coulee may also refer to:

- Lava coulee, a type of lava dome
- Coulee City, Washington, a town in the United States
- Coulee, Mountrail County, North Dakota, an unincorporated community in the United States
- Coulee, Pembina County, North Dakota, a populated place in the United States
- Rural Municipality of Coulee No. 136, a municipality in Canada
- Shea Couleé (born 1989), American drag queen
- Coulee Experimental State Forest, a state forest in the United States

== See also ==
- Coulee Region, also known as the Driftless Area, a region in the Midwest of the United States
- Grand Coulee (disambiguation)
- Coolie (disambiguation)
