= Pagachi-ye Markazi =

Pagachi-ye Markazi پاگچي مركزي
- Village
- Country: Iran
- Province: Khuzestan
- County: Ramhormoz
- Bakhsh: Central
- Rural District: Howmeh-ye Sharqi

Population (2006)
  - Total: 1,067
- Time zone: UTC+3:30 (IRST)
  - Summer (DST): UTC+4:30 (IRDT)

Pagachi-ye Markazi (Persian: پاگچي مركزي, also Romanized as Pāgachī-ye Markazī) is a village in Howmeh-ye Sharqi Rural District, in the Central District of Ramhormoz County, Khuzestan Province, Iran. At the 2006 census, its population was 1,067, in 225 families.
