= Magah Taneh Abul =

Magah Taneh Abul مگه تنه ابول
- Village
- Country: Iran
- Province: Khuzestan
- County: Ramhormoz
- Bakhsh: Central
- Rural District: Howmeh-ye Sharqi

Population (2006)
  - Total: 60
- Time zone: UTC+3:30 (IRST)
  - Summer (DST): UTC+4:30 (IRDT)

Magah Taneh Abul (Persian: مگه تنه ابول, also Romanized as Magah Taneh Ābūl) is a village in Howmeh-ye Sharqi Rural District, in the Central District of Ramhormoz County, Khuzestan Province, Iran. At the 2006 census, its population was 60, in 11 families.
