= Talkh =

Talkh (Persian: تلخ) may refer to:

- Talkh, alternate name of Tahar, Iran, Hormozgan Province
- Talkh-e Ataher, Hormozgan Province
- Talkh, Razavi Khorasan

== See also ==
- Talkh Ab (disambiguation)
- Talkhab (disambiguation)
- Tang Talkh (disambiguation)
