= Joknek River =

River in Iran

Jokanak River,(Persian: رودخانه جوکنک) known as Alaa River, is a river in Joknak village, Ramhormoz city, Khuzestan province.Joknek River is a river that is several thousand years old and originates from Mount Garun in the Mangshet mountain range near the land of Dishmuk. And after passing a path, the water of Jareh Dam, which is located in the area of Roudzard Mashin, joins Alaa River and after passing through the eastern border of Joknak village and irrigating Joknak plains, it joins Ramhormoz.

== Seasonal recreation in the river ==
Since Khuzestan is a hot province in the summer season, this issue has become an excuse for local people and tourists to visit and swim in the water of Joknek River to remove their body heat. Tourists travel to Joknek in all seasons to spend their free time and have fun on the beach.

== Anthropology ==
Among the natives of this river, those who commuted to Jokanak, their language was closer to Lori Bakhtiari and they spoke. Various clans have been settled in the villages along this river since the past.
