= Pagin =

Pagin may refer to:

== People ==
- Aimo Pagin (born 1983), French pianist
- Peter Pagin (born 1953), philosopher at Stockholm University, Sweden

== Places ==
- Pagin, Iran, a village in Khuzestan Province, Iran

== See also ==
- Paging, memory management scheme in computing
