= Dagher =

Dagher may refer to

== People with the surname ==
- Assia Dagher (1908-1986), Lebanese actress.
- Charbel Dagher, Lebanese academic.
- Ely Dagher, Lebanese film director.
- Fouad N. Dagher
  - Texaco Inc. v. Dagher, a court case.
- Manu Dagher (born 1984), Lebanese-Dutch football player.
- Pierre Dagher, Lebanese actor and voice actor
- Sandra Dagher (born 1978), Lebanese art curator.

== See also ==
- Deymeh-ye Dagher
- Budagher – Private college preparatory school in Albuquerque, New Mexico
