= Pagachi-ye Mambini =

Village in Khuzestan province, Iran

Pagachi-ye Mambini Persian: پاگچي ممبيني
- Village
- Location within Iran
- Coordinates: 31°17′52″N 49°36′47″E
- Country: Iran
- Province: Khuzestan
- County: Ramhormoz
- District: Central
- Rural District: Howmeh-ye Sharqi

Population (2016)
  - Total: 2,528
- Time zone: UTC+3:30 (IRST)

Pagachi-ye Mambini (Persian: پاگچي ممبيني) (Note: Also romanized as Pāgachī-ye Mambīnī) is a village in Howmeh-ye Sharqi Rural District of the Central District of Ramhormoz County, Khuzestan province, Iran.

== Demographics ==
=== Population ===
At the time of the 2006 National Census, the village's population was 1,806 in 353 households. The village makes no appearance in the following census of 2011. The 2016 census measured the population of the village as 2,528 people in 660 households. It was the most populous village in its rural district.
