= Basadi-ye Hajj Barun =

Village in Khuzestan province, Iran

Basadi-ye Hajj Barun Persian: باصدي حاج بارون
- Village
- Location within Iran
- Coordinates: 31°13′43″N 49°38′03″E
- Country: Iran
- Province: Khuzestan
- County: Ramhormoz
- District: Central
- Rural District: Howmeh-ye Sharqi

Population (2016)
  - Total: 820
- Time zone: UTC+3:30 (IRST)

Basadi-ye Hajj Barun (Persian: باصدي حاج بارون) (Note: Also romanized as Bāşadī-ye Ḩājj Bārūn; also known as Bāsadi, Bāşedī, and Bāseydī) is a village in, and the capital of, Howmeh-ye Sharqi Rural District of the Central District of Ramhormoz County, Khuzestan province, Iran.

== Demographics ==
=== Population ===
At the time of the 2006 National Census, the village's population was 890 in 192 households. The following census in 2011 counted 857 people in 208 households. The 2016 census measured the population of the village as 820 people in 222 households.
