= Bavaj =

City in Khuzestan province, Iran

Bavaj Persian: باوج
- City
- Location within Iran
- Coordinates: 31°08′48″N 49°54′45″E
- Country: Iran
- Province: Khuzestan
- County: Ramhormoz
- District: Abolfares

Population (2016)
  - Total: 487
- Time zone: UTC+3:30 (IRST)

Bavaj (Persian: باوج) (Note: Also romanized as Bāvaj) is a city in, and the capital of, Abolfares District of Ramhormoz County, Khuzestan province, Iran. It also serves as the administrative center for Abolfares Rural District.

== Demographics ==
=== Population ===
At the time of the 2006 National Census, Bavaj's population was 594 in 112 households, when it was a village in Abolfares Rural District of the Central District. The following census in 2011 counted 638 people in 143 households. The 2016 census measured the population of the village as 487 people in 134 households, by which time the rural district had been separated from the district in the formation of Abolfares District.

After the census, the village was elevated to the status of a city.
