= Soltanabad, Ramhormoz =

City in Khuzestan province, Iran

Soltanabad Persian: سلطان اباد
- City
- Location within Iran
- Coordinates: 31°02′54″N 49°41′55″E
- Country: Iran
- Province: Khuzestan
- County: Ramhormoz
- District: Soltanabad

Population (2016)
  - Total: 881
- Time zone: UTC+3:30 (IRST)

Soltanabad (Persian: سلطان اباد, Romanized as Solţānābād ) (Note: Also romanized as Solţānābād) is a city in, and the capital of, Soltanabad District of Ramhormoz County, Khuzestan province, Iran. It also serves as the administrative center for Soltanabad Rural District.

== Demographics ==
=== Population ===
At the time of the 2006 National Census, Soltanabad's population was 1,095 in 239 households, when it was a village in Soltanabad Rural District of the Central District. The following census in 2011 counted 867 people in 226 households. The 2016 census measured the population of the village as 881 people in 261 households, by which time the rural district had been separated from the district in the formation of Soltanabad District. It was the most populous village in its rural district.

After the census, Soltanabad was elevated to the status of a city.
