= Coolie No. 1 =

Coolie No. 1 may refer to:

- Coolie No. 1 (1991 film), a Telugu film directed by K. Raghavendra Rao starring Venkatesh and Tabu
- Coolie No. 1 (1995 film), a Bollywood film directed by David Dhawan starring Karisma Kapoor and Govinda
- Coolie No. 1 (2019 film), an Indian Bhojpuri-language film directed by Lal Babu Pandit and starring Khesari Lal Yadav and Kajal Raghwani
- Coolie No. 1 (2020 film), a Bollywood film directed by David Dhawan starring Varun Dhawan

== See also ==
- Coolie (disambiguation)
- No. 1 (disambiguation)
