= Coolie (disambiguation) =

Coolie is a historical term for indentured labourers and a contemporary racial slur.

Coolie may also refer to:

- Coolie (dog breed), an Australian dog breed
- Coolie (1983 Hindi film), a Hindi film
- Coolie (1983 Malayalam film), a Malayalam film
- Coolie (1995 film), a Tamil film
- Coolie (1997 film), a Bangladeshi film
- Coolie (2004 film), a Bengali film
- Coolie (2025 film), a Tamil film
  - Coolie (soundtrack), soundtrack album by Anirudh Ravichander
- Coolie (novel), a 1936 novel by Mulk Raj Anand
- The Coolies, a 1980s American alternative rock band from Atlanta, Georgia
- Coolie hat, British slang for an Asian conical hat

== See also ==
- Coulee, a deep steep-sided ravine formed by erosion
- Coulis, a type of puréed sauce
- Coolie No. 1 (disambiguation)
- Kuli (disambiguation)
- Quli (disambiguation)
- Fooly Cooly, i.e. foolish coolie, an anime FLCL about Asian children growing up
