= Mamatin Rural District =

Rural district in Khuzestan province, Iran

Mamatin Rural District Persian: دهستان ماماتین
- Rural District
- Location within Iran
- Coordinates: 31°17′38″N 49°44′49″E
- Country: Iran
- Province: Khuzestan
- County: Ramhormoz
- District: Rud Zard
- Capital: Gonbadlaran

Population (2016)
  - Total: 1,597
- Time zone: UTC+3:30 (IRST)

Mamatin Rural District (Persian: دهستان ماماتین) is in Rud Zard District of Ramhormoz County, Khuzestan province, Iran. Its capital is the village of Gonbadlaran.

== History ==
After the 2011 National Census, villages were separated from the Central District in the establishment of Rud Zard District, and Mamatin Rural District was created in the new district.

== Demographics ==
=== Population ===
At the time of the 2016 census, the rural district's population was 1,597 in 404 households. The most populous of its nine villages was Gonbadlaran, with 426 people.
