= Sarcheshmeh-ye Mushemi =

Sarcheshmeh-ye Mushemi سرچشمه موشمي
- Village
- Location within Iran
- Coordinates: 31°11′07″N 50°29′04″E
- Country: Iran
- Province: Kohgiluyeh and Boyer-Ahmad
- County: Kohgiluyeh
- Bakhsh: Charusa
- Rural District: Tayebi-ye Sarhadi-ye Gharbi

Population (2006)
  - Total: 123
- Time zone: UTC+3:30 (IRST)
  - Summer (DST): UTC+4:30 (IRDT)

Sarcheshmeh-ye Mushemi (Persian: سرچشمه موشمي, also Romanized as Sarcheshmeh-ye Mūshemī) is a village in Tayebi-ye Sarhadi-ye Gharbi Rural District, Charusa District, Kohgiluyeh County, Kohgiluyeh and Boyer-Ahmad Province, Iran. At the 2006 census, its population was 123, in 27 families.
