= Kuli, Akushinsky District, Republic of Dagestan =

Kuyili (Russian: Кюли) is a rural locality (a selo) in Balkharsky Selsoviet, Akushinsky District, Republic of Dagestan, Russia. The population was 157 as of 2010.

== Geography ==
Kuli is located 26 km northwest of Akusha (the district's administrative centre) by road. Balkar is the nearest rural locality.
