= Darvishan Sarbisheh =

Darvishan Sarbisheh درويشان سربيشه
- Village
- Location within Iran
- Coordinates: 33°33′32″N 46°49′19″E
- Country: Iran
- Province: Lorestan
- County: Kuhdasht
- Bakhsh: Kunani
- Rural District: Zirtang

Population (2006)
  - Total: 107
- Time zone: UTC+3:30 (IRST)
  - Summer (DST): UTC+4:30 (IRDT)

Darvishan Sarbisheh (Persian: درويشان سربيشه, also romanized as Darvīshān Sarbīsheh; also known as Darvīshān, Qaryeh-ye Darvīshān and Qaryeh-ye Darvishān) is a village in Zirtang Rural District, Kunani District, Kuhdasht County, Lorestan Province, Iran. At the 2006 census its population was 107, in 20 families.
