= Soltanabad District =

District in Khuzestan province, Iran

Soltanabad District Persian: بخش سلطان‌آباد
- District
- Location within Iran
- Coordinates: 31°05′44″N 49°42′58″E
- Country: Iran
- Province: Khuzestan
- County: Ramhormoz
- Capital: Soltanabad

Population (2016)
  - Total: 8,014
- Time zone: UTC+3:30 (IRST)

Soltanabad District (Persian: بخش سلطان‌آباد) is in Ramhormoz County, Khuzestan province, Iran. Its capital is the city of Soltanabad.

== History ==
After the 2011 National Census, Soltanabad Rural District was separated from the Central District in the formation of Soltanabad District. After the 2016 census, the village of Soltanabad was elevated to the status of a city.

== Demographics ==
=== Population ===
At the time of the 2016 census, the district's population was 8,014 inhabitants in 2,231 households.

=== Administrative divisions ===
Soltanabad District Population
Administrative Divisions	2016
Rostamabad RD	3,610
Soltanabad RD	4,404
Soltanabad (city) (Note: Became a city after the 2016 census)	
Total	8,014
RD = Rural District
