= Zir Zard-e Alishahi =

Zir Zard-e Alishahi زيرزردعلي شاهي
- Village
- Location within Iran
- Coordinates: 30°10′54″N 51°42′46″E
- Country: Iran
- Province: Fars
- County: Mamasani
- Bakhsh: Central
- Rural District: Javid-e Mahuri

Population (2006)
  - Total: 83
- Time zone: UTC+3:30 (IRST)
  - Summer (DST): UTC+4:30 (IRDT)

Zir Zard-e Alishahi (Persian: زيرزردعلي شاهي, also Romanized as Zīr Zard-e 'Alīshāhī; also known as Zir-e Rūd and Zīr-e Zard) is a village in Javid-e Mahuri Rural District, in the Central District of Mamasani County, Fars province, Iran. At the 2006 census, its population was 83, in 19 families.
