= Darvishan, West Azerbaijan =

Darvishan درويشان
- Village
- Location within Iran
- Coordinates: 36°26′20″N 45°56′50″E
- Country: Iran
- Province: West Azerbaijan
- County: Bukan
- Bakhsh: Central
- Rural District: Il Teymur

Population (2006)
  - Total: 265
- Time zone: UTC+3:30 (IRST)
  - Summer (DST): UTC+4:30 (IRDT)

Darvishan (Persian: درويشان, also romanized as Darvīshān) is a village in Il Teymur Rural District, in the Central District of Bukan County, West Azerbaijan Province, Iran. At the 2006 census its population was 265, in 56 families.
