= Grand Coulee (disambiguation) =

Grand Coulee may refer to:

- Grand Coulee, an ancient river bed in Washington, United States
- Grand Coulee Dam, the largest hydroelectric generating facility in the United States
- "Grand Coulee Dam" (song), an American folk song by Woody Guthrie
- Grand Coulee, Saskatchewan, a town in Saskatchewan, Canada
- Grand Coulee, Washington, a city in Grant County, Washington, United States
