= Darvishan, Kermanshah =

Darvishan درويشان
- Village
- Location within Iran
- Coordinates: 34°27′09″N 47°42′55″E
- Country: Iran
- Province: Kermanshah
- County: Sahneh
- Bakhsh: Central
- Rural District: Sahneh

Population (2006)
  - Total: 195
- Time zone: UTC+3:30 (IRST)
  - Summer (DST): UTC+4:30 (IRDT)

Darvishan (Persian: درويشان, also Romanized as Darvīshān) is a village in Sahneh Rural District, in the Central District of Sahneh County, Kermanshah Province, Iran. At the 2006 census, its population was 195, in 45 families.
