= Quli =

Quli may refer to:

- Quli (Turkic), a word of Turkic origin meaning 'slave of', part of several Muslim male given names
- Quli (racial slur), a contemporary racial slur for people of Asian descent
- Quli, Guangxi, a town in Fusui County, Guangxi, China

== See also ==
- Kuli (disambiguation)
