= Deymeh-ye Yaqub =

Deymeh-ye Yaqub ديمه يعقوب
- Village
- Location within Iran
- Coordinates: 30°42′10″N 48°50′46″E
- Country: Iran
- Province: Khuzestan
- County: Shadegan
- Bakhsh: Central
- Rural District: Buzi

Population (2006)
  - Total: 330
- Time zone: UTC+3:30 (IRST)
  - Summer (DST): UTC+4:30 (IRDT)

Deymeh-ye Yaqub (Persian: ديمه يعقوب, also Romanized as Deymeh-ye Ya‘qūb; also known as Deymeh and Deymeh-ye Ḩamūd) is a village in Buzi Rural District, in the Central District of Shadegan County, Khuzestan Province, Iran. At the 2006 census, its population was 330, in 64 families.
