= Deymeh Kamar =

Deymeh Kamar ديمه كمر
- Village
- Location within Iran
- Coordinates: 31°25′36″N 50°00′08″E
- Country: Iran
- Province: Khuzestan
- County: Bagh-e Malek
- Bakhsh: Central
- Rural District: Haparu

Population (2006)
  - Total: 58
- Time zone: UTC+3:30 (IRST)
  - Summer (DST): UTC+4:30 (IRDT)

Deymeh Kamar (Persian: ديمه كمر) is a village in Haparu Rural District, in the Central District of Bagh-e Malek County, Khuzestan Province, Iran. At the 2006 census, its population was 58, in 8 families.
