= Darvishan, Fars =

Darvishan درويشان
- Village
- Location within Iran
- Coordinates: 28°39′20″N 53°02′03″E
- Country: Iran
- Province: Fars
- County: Jahrom
- Bakhsh: Simakan
- Rural District: Pol Beh Pain

Population (2006)
  - Total: 142
- Time zone: UTC+3:30 (IRST)
  - Summer (DST): UTC+4:30 (IRDT)

Darvishan (Persian: درويشان, also Romanized as Darvīshān) is a village in Pol Beh Pain Rural District, Simakan District, Jahrom County, Fars province, Iran. At the 2006 census, its population was 142, in 26 families.
