= Tahar, Iran =

Tahar طهر
- Village
- Location within Iran
- Coordinates: 27°07′44″N 55°22′32″E
- Country: Iran
- Province: Hormozgan
- County: Bastak
- Bakhsh: Central
- Rural District: Deh Tall

Population (2006)
  - Total: 176
- Time zone: UTC+3:30 (IRST)
  - Summer (DST): UTC+4:30 (IRDT)

Tahar (Persian: طهر, also Romanized as Ţahar; also known as Talkh) is a village in Deh Tall Rural District, in the Central District of Bastak County, Hormozgan Province, Iran. At the 2006 census, its population was 176, in 32 families.
