= Sarcheshmeh-ye Kamalvand =

Sarcheshmeh-ye Kamalvand سرچشمه كمالوند
- Village
- Country: Iran
- Province: Lorestan
- County: Khorramabad
- Bakhsh: Central
- Rural District: Dehpir

Population (2006)
  - Total: 170
- Time zone: UTC+3:30 (IRST)
  - Summer (DST): UTC+4:30 (IRDT)

Sarcheshmeh-ye Kamalvand (Persian: سرچشمه كمالوند, also Romanized as Sarcheshmeh-ye Kamālvand) is a village in Dehpir Rural District, in the Central District of Khorramabad County, Lorestan Province, Iran. At the 2006 census, its population was 170, in 39 families.
