= Zir-e Zard, Bagh-e Malek =

Zir-e Zard زيرزرد
- Village
- Country: Iran
- Province: Khuzestan
- County: Bagh-e Malek
- Bakhsh: Central
- Rural District: Rud Zard

Population (2006)
  - Total: 16
- Time zone: UTC+3:30 (IRST)
  - Summer (DST): UTC+4:30 (IRDT)

Zir-e Zard (Persian: زيرزرد, also Romanized as Zīr-e Zard) is a village in Rud Zard Rural District, in the Central District of Bagh-e Malek County, Khuzestan Province, Iran. At the 2006 census, its population was 16, in 6 families.
