= Kuli, Ghana =

Coordinates: 9.668°N 1.186°W

Kuli is a community in Tolon District in the Northern Region of Ghana.

== See also ==
- Suburbs of Tolon District
