= Sar Cheshmeh, Kurdistan =

Sar Cheshmeh سرچشمه
- Village
- Location within Iran
- Coordinates: 36°21′27″N 46°15′17″E
- Country: Iran
- Province: Kurdistan
- County: Saqqez
- Bakhsh: Central
- Rural District: Sara

Population (2006)
  - Total: 519
- Time zone: UTC+3:30 (IRST)
  - Summer (DST): UTC+4:30 (IRDT)

Sar Cheshmeh (Persian: سرچشمه) is a village in Sara Rural District, in the Central District of Saqqez County, Kurdistan Province, Iran. At the 2006 census, its population was 519, in 102 families. The village is populated by Kurds.
