= Sar Cheshmeh, Rabor =

Sar Cheshmeh سرچشمه
- Village
- Location within Iran
- Coordinates: 29°18′01″N 57°13′40″E
- Country: Iran
- Province: Kerman
- County: Rabor
- Bakhsh: Hanza
- Rural District: Hanza

Population (2006)
  - Total: 61
- Time zone: UTC+3:30 (IRST)
  - Summer (DST): UTC+4:30 (IRDT)

Sar Cheshmeh (Persian: سرچشمه, also Romanized as Sarcheshmeh) is a village in Hanza Rural District, Hanza District, Rabor County, Kerman Province, Iran. At the 2006 census, its population was 61, in 15 families.
