= Deymeh-ye Kuchek =

Deymeh-ye Kuchek دیمه کوچک
- Village
- Location within Iran
- Coordinates: 30°46′32″N 48°54′00″E
- Country: Iran
- Province: Khuzestan
- County: Shadegan
- Bakhsh: Central
- Rural District: Hoseyni

Population (2006)
  - Total: 161
- Time zone: UTC+3:30 (IRST)
  - Summer (DST): UTC+4:30 (IRDT)

Deymeh-ye Kuchek (Persian: دیمه کوچک, also Romanized as Deymeh-ye Kūchek; also known as Dehmeh-ye Kūchak) is a village in Hoseyni Rural District, in the Central District of Shadegan County, Khuzestan Province, Iran. As of the 2006 census, its population was 161, with there being 25 families.
