= Gharganeh, Shadegan =

Gharganeh غرگانه
- Village
- Location within Iran
- Coordinates: 30°46′12″N 48°55′24″E
- Country: Iran
- Province: Khuzestan
- County: Shadegan
- Bakhsh: Central
- Rural District: Buzi

Population (2006)
  - Total: 100
- Time zone: UTC+3:30 (IRST)
  - Summer (DST): UTC+4:30 (IRDT)

Gharganeh (Persian: غرگانه, also Romanized as Ghargāneh; also known as Qargāneh and Zobeydī) is a village in Buzi Rural District, in the Central District of Shadegan County, Khuzestan Province, Iran. At the 2006 census, its population was 100, in 22 families.
