= Darvishan, Divandarreh =

Darvishan درويشان
- Village
- Location within Iran
- Coordinates: 35°42′53″N 46°45′14″E
- Country: Iran
- Province: Kurdistan
- County: Divandarreh
- Bakhsh: Saral
- Rural District: Saral

Population (2006)
  - Total: 75
- Time zone: UTC+3:30 (IRST)
  - Summer (DST): UTC+4:30 (IRDT)

Darvishan (Persian: درويشان, also Romanized as Darvīshān) is a village in Saral Rural District, Saral District, Divandarreh County, Kurdistan Province, Iran. At the 2006 census, its population was 75, in 14 families. The village is populated by Kurds.
