= Kuli Seran =

Kuli Seran كولي سران
- Village
- Location within Iran
- Coordinates: 37°09′26″N 49°26′57″E
- Country: Iran
- Province: Gilan
- County: Shaft
- Bakhsh: Central
- Rural District: Jirdeh

Population (2006)
  - Total: 286
- Time zone: UTC+3:30 (IRST)
  - Summer (DST): UTC+4:30 (IRDT)

Kuli Seran (Persian: كولي سران, also Romanized as Kūlī Serān) is a village in Jirdeh Rural District, in the Central District of Shaft County, Gilan Province, Iran. At the 2006 census, its population was 286, in 65 families.
