= Kuli Darreh =

Kuli Darreh كولي دره
- Village
- Location within Iran
- Coordinates: 38°39′43″N 47°23′32″E
- Country: Iran
- Province: East Azerbaijan
- County: Ahar
- Bakhsh: Central
- Rural District: Vargahan

Population (2006)
  - Total: 73
- Time zone: UTC+3:30 (IRST)
  - Summer (DST): UTC+4:30 (IRDT)

Kuli Darreh (Persian: كولي دره, also Romanized as Kūlī Darreh; also known as Gavī Darreh and Kūlardeh) is a village in Vargahan Rural District, in the Central District of Ahar County, East Azerbaijan Province, Iran. At the 2006 census, its population was 73, in 18 families.
