= Dimeh Kuh-e Khayiz =

Dimeh Kuh-e Khayiz ديمه كوه خائيز
- Village
- Country: Iran
- Province: Kohgiluyeh and Boyer-Ahmad
- County: Kohgiluyeh
- Bakhsh: Central
- Rural District: Dehdasht-e Gharbi

Population (2006)
  - Total: 75
- Time zone: UTC+3:30 (IRST)
  - Summer (DST): UTC+4:30 (IRDT)

Dimeh Kuh-e Khayiz (Persian: ديمه كوه خائيز, also Romanized as Dīmeh Kūh-e Khāyīz) is a village in Dehdasht-e Gharbi Rural District, in the Central District of Kohgiluyeh County, Kohgiluyeh and Boyer-Ahmad Province, Iran. At the 2006 census, its population was 75, in 13 families.
