= Sar Kuraki-ye Deli Rich-e Olya =

Sar Kuraki-ye Deli Rich-e Olya سركوركي دلي ريچ عليا
- Village
- Location within Iran
- Coordinates: 30°59′33″N 51°05′49″E
- Country: Iran
- Province: Kohgiluyeh and Boyer-Ahmad
- County: Boyer-Ahmad
- Bakhsh: Margown
- Rural District: Margown

Population (2006)
  - Total: 179
- Time zone: UTC+3:30 (IRST)
  - Summer (DST): UTC+4:30 (IRDT)

Sar Kuraki-ye Deli Rich-e Olya (Persian: سركوركي دلي ريچ عليا, also Romanized as Sar Kūrakī-ye Delī Rīch-e ‘Olyā; also known as Sar Kūhakī and Sar Kūrakī) is a village in Margown Rural District, Margown District, Boyer-Ahmad County, Kohgiluyeh and Boyer-Ahmad Province, Iran. At the 2006 census, its population was 179, in 31 families.
