= Pa Gach-e Kal Jamshid =

Pa Gach-e Kal Jamshid پاگچ كل جمشيد
- Village
- Location within Iran
- Coordinates: 30°52′15″N 50°08′58″E
- Country: Iran
- Province: Kohgiluyeh and Boyer-Ahmad
- County: Bahmai
- Bakhsh: Central
- Rural District: Bahmai-ye Garmsiri-ye Jonubi

Population (2006)
  - Total: 63
- Time zone: UTC+3:30 (IRST)
  - Summer (DST): UTC+4:30 (IRDT)

Pa Gach-e Kal Jamshid (Persian: پاگچ كل جمشيد, also Romanized as Pā Gach-e Kal Jamshīd; also known as ‘Asgarī, Pā Gach, and Pā Gachī) is a village in Bahmai-ye Garmsiri-ye Jonubi Rural District, in the Central District of Bahmai County, Kohgiluyeh and Boyer-Ahmad Province, Iran. At the 2006 census, its population was 63, in 12 families.
