= Deymeh-ye Dagher =

Deymeh-ye Dagher ديمه داغر
- Village
- Country: Iran
- Province: Khuzestan
- County: Shadegan
- Bakhsh: Central
- Rural District: Buzi

Population (2006)
  - Total: 37
- Time zone: UTC+3:30 (IRST)
  - Summer (DST): UTC+4:30 (IRDT)

Deymeh-ye Dagher (Persian: ديمه داغر, also Romanized as Deymeh-ye Dāgher) is a village in Buzi Rural District, in the Central District of Shadegan County, Khuzestan Province, Iran. At the 2006 census, its population was 37, in 6 families.
