= Rud Zard District =

District in Khuzestan province, Iran

Rud Zard District Persian: بخش رودزرد
- District
- Location within Iran
- Coordinates: 31°20′51″N 49°44′54″E
- Country: Iran
- Province: Khuzestan
- County: Ramhormoz
- Capital: Rud Zard-e Mashin

Population (2016)
  - Total: 4,495
- Time zone: UTC+3:30 (IRST)

Rud Zard District (Persian: بخش رودزرد) is in Ramhormoz County, Khuzestan province, Iran. Its capital is the city of Rud Zard-e Mashin.

== History ==
After the 2011 National Census, villages were separated from the Central District in the formation of Rud Zard District.

After the 2016 census, the village of Rud Zard-e Mashin was elevated to the status of a city.

== Demographics ==
=== Population ===
At the time of the 2016 census, the district's population was 4,495 inhabitants in 1,152 households.

=== Administrative divisions ===
Rud Zard District Population
Administrative Divisions	2016
Jereh RD	2,898
Mamatin RD	1,597
Rud Zard-e Mashin (city) (Note: Became a city after the 2016 census)	
Total	4,495
RD = Rural District
