= Rud Zard-e Mashin =

City in Khuzestan province, Iran

Rud Zard-e Mashin Persian: رودزرد ماشين
- City
- Location within Iran
- Coordinates: 31°22′07″N 49°43′22″E
- Country: Iran
- Province: Khuzestan
- County: Haftkel
- District: Rud Zard

Population (2016)
  - Total: 2,252
- Time zone: UTC+3:30 (IRST)

Rud Zard-e Mashin (Persian: رودزردماشين) (Note: Also romanized as Rūd Zard-e Māshīn and Rūd-e Zard Māshīn; also known as Rūd Zard and Rūd Zard-e Sādāt) is a city in, and the capital of, Rud Zard District of Haftkel County, Khuzestan province, Iran. It also serves as the administrative center for Jereh Rural District.

== Demographics ==
=== Population ===
At the time of the 2006 National Census, Rud Zard-e Mashin's population was 2,625 in 533 households, when it was a village in Howmeh-ye Sharqi Rural District of the Central District. The following census in 2011 counted 2,344 people in 527 households. The 2016 census measured the population of the city as 2,252 people in 588 households, by which time the village had been separated from the district in the formation of Rud Zard District. Rud Zard-e Mashin was transferred to Mamatin Rural District created in the new district. It was the most populous village in its rural district.

After the census, Rud Zard-e Mashin was elevated to the status of a city.
