= Abolfares District =

District in Khuzestan province, Iran

Abolfares District Persian: بخش ابولفارس
- District
- Location within Iran
- Coordinates: 31°06′19″N 49°53′21″E
- Country: Iran
- Province: Khuzestan
- County: Ramhormoz
- Capital: Bavaj

Population (2016)
  - Total: 5,610
- Time zone: UTC+3:30 (IRST)

Abolfares District (Persian: بخش ابولفارس) is in Ramhormoz County, Khuzestan province, Iran. Its capital is the city of Bavaj.

== History ==
After the 2011 National Census, Abolfares Rural District was separated from the Central District in the formation of Abolfares District. After the 2016 census, the village of Bavaj was elevated to the status of a city.

== Demographics ==
=== Population ===
At the time of the 2016 census, the district's population was 5,610 inhabitants in 1,483 households.

=== Administrative divisions ===
Abolfares District Population
Administrative Divisions	2016
Abolfares RD	2,503
Seh Tolun RD	3,107
Bavaj (city) (Note: Became a city after the 2016 census)	
Total	5,610
RD = Rural District
