= Abolfares Rural District =

Rural district in Khuzestan province, Iran

Abolfares Rural District Persian: دهستان ابوالفارس
- Rural District
- Location within Iran
- Coordinates: 31°03′46″N 49°55′03″E
- Country: Iran
- Province: Khuzestan
- County: Ramhormoz
- District: Abolfares
- Capital: Bavaj

Population (2016)
  - Total: 2,503
- Time zone: UTC+3:30 (IRST)

Abolfares Rural District (Persian: دهستان ابوالفارس) is in Abolfares District of Ramhormoz County, Khuzestan province, Iran. It is administered from the city of Bavaj.

== Demographics ==
=== Population ===
At the time of the 2006 National Census, the rural district's population (as a part of the Central District) was 6,336 in 1,265 households. There were 6,177 inhabitants in 1,403 households at the following census of 2011. The 2016 census measured the population of the rural district as 2,503 in 689 households, by which time the rural district had been separated from the district in the formation of Abolfares District. The most populous of its 19 villages was Hajjiabad, with 495 people.
