= Soltanabad Rural District (Ramhormoz County) =

Rural district in Khuzestan province, Iran

Soltanabad Rural District Persian: دهستان سلطان آباد
- Rural District
- Location within Iran
- Coordinates: 31°02′55″N 49°45′17″E
- Country: Iran
- Province: Khuzestan
- County: Ramhormoz
- District: Soltanabad
- Capital: Soltanabad

Population (2016)
  - Total: 4,404
- Time zone: UTC+3:30 (IRST)

Soltanabad Rural District (Persian: دهستان سلطان آباد) is in Soltanabad District of Ramhormoz County, Khuzestan province, Iran. It is administered from the city of Soltanabad.

== Demographics ==
=== Population ===
At the time of the 2006 National Census, the rural district's population (as a part of the Central District) was 5,612 in 1,070 households. There were 4,938 inhabitants in 1,215 households at the following census of 2011. The 2016 census measured the population of the rural district as 4,404 in 1,194 households, by which time the rural district had been separated from the district in the formation of Soltanabad District. The most populous of its 19 villages was Soltanabad (now a city), with 881 people.
