= Howmeh-ye Gharbi Rural District (Ramhormoz County) =

Rural district in Khuzestan province, Iran

Howmeh-ye Gharbi Rural District Persian: دهستان حومه غربي
- Rural District
- Location within Iran
- Coordinates: 31°15′17″N 49°26′45″E
- Country: Iran
- Province: Khuzestan
- County: Ramhormoz
- District: Central
- Capital: Marbacheh

Population (2016)
  - Total: 8,591
- Time zone: UTC+3:30 (IRST)

Howmeh-ye Gharbi Rural District (Persian: دهستان حومه غربي) is in the Central District of Ramhormoz County, Khuzestan province, Iran. Its capital is the village of Marbacheh.

== Demographics ==
=== Population ===
At the time of the 2006 National Census, the rural district's population was 12,985 in 2,591 households. There were 8,795 inhabitants in 2,032 households at the following census of 2011. The 2016 census measured the population of the rural district as 8,591 in 2,272 households. The most populous of its 96 villages was Marbacheh, with 849 people.
