= Howmeh-ye Sharqi Rural District (Ramhormoz County) =

Rural district in Khuzestan province, Iran

Howmeh-ye Sharqi Rural District Persian: دهستان حومه شرقي
- Rural District
- Location within Iran
- Coordinates: 31°16′23″N 49°38′39″E
- Country: Iran
- Province: Khuzestan
- County: Ramhormoz
- District: Central
- Capital: Basadi-ye Hajj Barun

Population (2016)
  - Total: 12,706
- Time zone: UTC+3:30 (IRST)

Howmeh-ye Sharqi Rural District (Persian: دهستان حومه شرقي) is in the Central District of Ramhormoz County, Khuzestan province, Iran. Its capital is the village of Basadi-ye Hajj Barun.

== Demographics ==
=== Population ===
At the time of the 2006 National Census, the rural district's population was 22,806 in 4,756 households. There were 15,103 inhabitants in 3,545 households at the following census of 2011. The 2016 census measured the population of the rural district as 12,706 in 3,311 households. The most populous of its 55 villages was Pagachi-ye Mambini, with 2,528 people.
