= Ramhormoz County =

County in Khuzestan province, Iran

Ramhormoz County Persian: شهرستان رامهرمز
- County
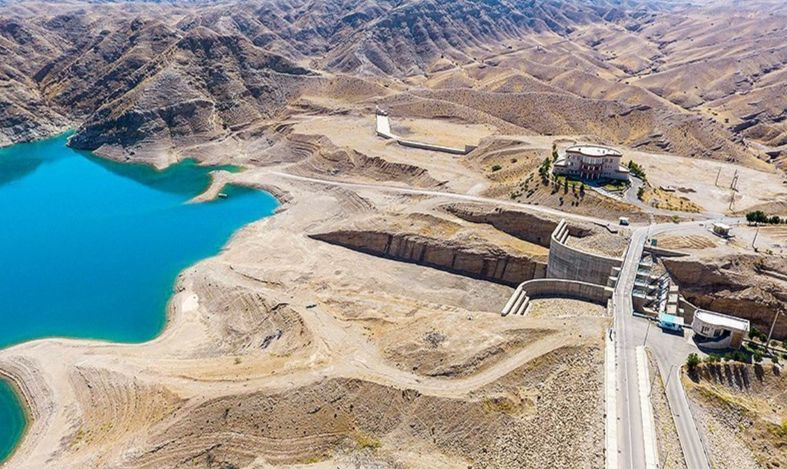
- Jarreh Dam, near Ramhormoz

- Location of Ramhormoz County in Khuzestan province (center right, yellow)

- Location of Khuzestan Province in Iran
- Coordinates: 31°12′N 49°39′E
- Country: Iran
- Province: Khuzestan
- Capital: Ramhormoz
- Districts: Central, Abolfares, Rud Zard, Soltanabad

Population (2016)
  - Total: 113,776
- Time zone: UTC+3:30 (IRST)

Ramhormoz County (Persian: شهرستان رامهرمز) (Note: Lurish: رۉمەز, romanized as Rümez) is in Khuzestan Province, Iran. Its capital is the city of Ramhormoz.

== History ==
After the 2006 National Census, Haftkel District was separated from the county in the establishment of Haftkel County.

After the 2011 census, Abolfares and Soltanabad Rural Districts were separated from the Central District in the formation of Abolfares, Rud Zard, and Soltanabad Districts, respectively, with two rural districts each. As a result, four new rural districts were created: Jereh, Mamatin, Rostamabad, and Seh Tolun.

After the 2016 census, the villages of Bavaj, Rud Zard-e Mashin, and Soltanabad were elevated to city status.

== Demographics ==
=== Dialect ===
people speak Bakhtiari dialect like Masjid Suleiman and Aghajari. Iranica has clearly considered the language of the communities living in Ramhormoz to be Southern Luri. Ramhormzi dialect is a pseudo Bakhtiari dialect..The language of the people of Ramhormoz (also called Romsi) is Bakhtiari dialect. Ramhormzi's accent is the same as Lori Bakhtiari's, which is slightly different.

=== Population ===
At the time of the 2006 census, the county's population was 120,194 in 25.359 households. The following census in 2011 counted 105,418 people in 25,313 households. The 2016 census measured the population of the county as 113,776 in 30,591 households.

=== Administrative divisions ===
Ramhormoz County's population history and administrative structure over three consecutive censuses are shown in the following table.

Ramhormoz County Population
Administrative Divisions	2006	2011	2016
Central District	97,561	104,882	95,582
Abolfares RD	6,336	6,177	
Howmeh-ye Gharbi RD	12,985	8,795	8,591
Howmeh-ye Sharqi RD	22,806	15,103	12,706
Soltanabad RD	5,612	4,938	
Ramhormoz (city)	49,822	69,869	74,285
Abolfares District			5,610
Abolfares RD			2,503
Seh Tolun RD			3,107
Bavaj (city) (Note: Became a city after the 2016 census)			
Haftkel District (Note: Transferred to Haftkel County)	22,633		
Gazin RD	5,352		
Haftkel RD	2,546		
Haftkel (city)	14,735		
Rud Zard District			4,495
Jereh RD			2,898
Mamatin RD			1,597
Rud Zard-e Mashin (city) (Note: Became a city after the 2016 census)			
Soltanabad District			8,014
Rostamabad RD			3,610
Soltanabad RD			4,404
Soltanabad (city) (Note: Became a city after the 2016 census)			
Total	120,194	105,418	113,776
RD = Rural District

== See also ==
Media related to Ramhormoz County at Wikimedia Commons
