= Central District (Ramhormoz County) =

District in Khuzestan province, Iran

Central District (Ramhormoz County) Persian: بخش مرکزی شهرستان رامهرمز
- District
- Location within Iran
- Coordinates: 31°15′17″N 49°30′16″E
- Country: Iran
- Province: Khuzestan
- County: Ramhormoz
- Capital: Ramhormoz

Population (2016)
  - Total: 95,582
- Time zone: UTC+3:30 (IRST)

The Central District of Ramhormoz County (Persian: بخش مرکزی شهرستان رامهرمز) is in Khuzestan province, Iran. Its capital is the city of Ramhormoz.

== History ==
After the 2011 National Census, Abolfares and Soltanabad Rural Districts were separated from the district in the formation of Abolfares, Rud Zard, and Soltanabad Districts, respectively.

== Demographics ==
=== Population ===
At the time of the 2006 census, the district's population was 97,561 in 20,648 households. The following census in 2011 counted 104,882 people in 25,241 households. The 2016 census measured the population of the district as 95,582 inhabitants in 25,710 households.

=== Administrative divisions ===
Central District (Ramhormoz County) Population
Administrative Divisions	2006	2011	2016
Abolfares RD (Note: Transferred to Abolfares District)	6,336	6,177	
Howmeh-ye Gharbi RD	12,985	8,795	8,591
Howmeh-ye Sharqi RD	22,806	15,103	12,706
Soltanabad RD (Note: Transferred to Soltanabad District)	5,612	4,938	
Ramhormoz (city)	49,822	69,869	74,285
Total	97,561	104,882	95,582
RD = Rural District
