= Abezhdan =

Abezhdan (Persian: ابژدان) may refer to:

- Abezhdan, Andika
- Abezhdan-e Malmulil
- Abezhdan, alternate name of Sar Gach, Andika
- Abezhdan, Ramhormoz
- Abezhdan-e Sofla, Ramhormoz County
- Abezhdan District, in Andika County
- Abezhdan Rural District, in Andika County
