= Yek Borji, Khuzestan =

Neighborhood in Khuzestan province, Iran

Yek Borji Persian: يك برجي
- Neighborhood
- Location within Iran
- Coordinates: 32°03′13″N 49°26′18″E
- Country: Iran
- Province: Khuzestan
- County: Andika
- District: Abezhdan
- City: Abezhdan

Population (2011)
  - Total: 56
- Time zone: UTC+3:30 (IRST)

Yek Borji (Persian: يك برجي) (Note: Also romanized as Yek Borjī) is a neighborhood in the city of Abezhdan in Abezhdan District of Andika County, Khuzestan province, Iran.

== Demographics ==
=== Population ===
At the time of the 2006 National Census, Yek Borji's population was 56 in 15 households, when it was a village in Abezhdan Rural District of the former Andika District in Masjed Soleyman County. The following census in 2011 counted 56 people in 14 households, by which time the district had been separated from the county in the establishment of Andika County. The rural district was transferred to the new Abezhdan District.

After the census, the village of Jafarabad merged with the villages of Abezhdan, Naser Khosrow, Shahrak-e Yaser, and Yek Borji, and was elevated to city status as Abezhdan.
