= Shahrak-e Yaser =

Neighborhood in Khuzestan province, Iran

Shahrak-e Yaser Persian: شهرك ياسر
- Neighborhood
- Location within Iran
- Coordinates: 32°04′13″N 49°26′51″E
- Country: Iran
- Province: Khuzestan
- County: Andika
- District: Abezhdan
- City: Abezhdan

Population (2011)
  - Total: 444
- Time zone: UTC+3:30 (IRST)

Shahrak-e Yaser (Persian: شهرك ياسر) (Note: Also romanized as Shahrak-e Yāser) is a neighborhood in the city of Abezhdan in Abezhdan District of Andika County, Khuzestan province, Iran.

== Demographics ==
=== Population ===
At the time of the 2006 National Census, Shahrak-e Yaser's population was 404 in 66 households, when it was a village in Abezhdan Rural District of the former Andika District in Masjed Soleyman County. The following census in 2011 counted 444 people in 96 households, by which time the district had been separated from the county in the establishment of Andika County. The rural district was transferred to the new Abezhdan District.

After the census, the village of Jafarabad merged with the villages of Abezhdan, Naser Khosrow, Shahrak-e Yaser, and Yek Borji, and was elevated to city status as Abezhdan.
