= Saleh Ebrahim =

Saleh Ebrahim صالح ابراهيم
- Village
- Location within Iran
- Coordinates: 32°23′57″N 49°37′52″E
- Country: Iran
- Province: Khuzestan
- County: Andika
- Bakhsh: Chelo
- Rural District: Lalar and Katak

Population (2006)
  - Total: 52
- Time zone: UTC+3:30 (IRST)
  - Summer (DST): UTC+4:30 (IRDT)

Saleh Ebrahim (Persian: صالح ابراهيم, also Romanized as Şāleḩ Ebrāhīm) is a village in Lalar and Katak Rural District, Chelo District, Andika County, Khuzestan Province, Iran. At the 2006 census, its population was 52, in 8 families.
