= Gelalak =

Gelalak or Galalak (Persian: گلالك), sometimes also transliterated as Galalag may refer to:

- Galalak, Andika
- Gelalak (32°21′ N 49°47′ E), Andika
- Gelalak (32°23′ N 49°43′ E), Andika
