= Chegarman =

Chegarman چگارمان
- Village
- Location within Iran
- Coordinates: 32°11′48″N 49°28′42″E
- Country: Iran
- Province: Khuzestan
- County: Andika
- Bakhsh: Central
- Rural District: Qaleh-ye Khvajeh

Population (2006)
  - Total: 1,210
- Time zone: UTC+3:30 (IRST)
  - Summer (DST): UTC+4:30 (IRDT)

Chegarman (Persian: چگارمان, also Romanized as Chegārmān, Chekāremān, Chekārmān, and Chogārmān) is a village in Qaleh-ye Khvajeh Rural District, in the Central District of Andika County, Khuzestan Province, Iran. At the 2006 census, its population was 1,210, in 229 families.
