= Deh Gharati =

Deh Gharati ده غارتي
- Village
- Location within Iran
- Coordinates: 32°05′48″N 49°34′24″E
- Country: Iran
- Province: Khuzestan
- County: Andika
- Bakhsh: Abezhdan
- Rural District: Kushk

Population (2006)
  - Total: 59
- Time zone: UTC+3:30 (IRST)
  - Summer (DST): UTC+4:30 (IRDT)

Deh Gharati (Persian: ده غارتي, also Romanized as Deh Ghāratī; also known as Gharati) is a village in Kushk Rural District, Abezhdan District, Andika County, Khuzestan Province, Iran. At the 2006 census, its population was 59, in 10 families.
