= Deh-e Dik =

Deh-e Dik ده ديك
- Village
- Country: Iran
- Province: Khuzestan
- County: Andika
- Bakhsh: Chelo
- Rural District: Lalar and Katak

Population (2006)
  - Total: 199
- Time zone: UTC+3:30 (IRST)
  - Summer (DST): UTC+4:30 (IRDT)

Deh-e Dik (Persian: ده ديك, also Romanized as Deh-e Dīḵ) is a village in Lalar and Katak Rural District, Chelo District, Andika County, Khuzestan Province, Iran. At the 2006 census, its population was 199, in 36 families.
