= Bustanak =

Bustanak بوستانك
- Village
- Location within Iran
- Coordinates: 32°07′50″N 49°22′42″E
- Country: Iran
- Province: Khuzestan
- County: Andika
- Bakhsh: Central
- Rural District: Qaleh-ye Khvajeh

Population (2006)
  - Total: 58
- Time zone: UTC+3:30 (IRST)
  - Summer (DST): UTC+4:30 (IRDT)

Bustanak (Persian: بوستانك, also Romanized as Būstānak; also known as Boostanak Andika and Būstānak-e Andīkā) is a village in Qaleh-ye Khvajeh Rural District, in the Central District of Andika County, Khuzestan Province, Iran. At the 2006 census, its population was 58, in 9 families.
