= Kham Karabad-e Galleh Tavak =

Kham Karabad-e Galleh Tavak خمكارابادگله توك
- Village
- Location within Iran
- Coordinates: 32°15′01″N 49°28′59″E
- Country: Iran
- Province: Khuzestan
- County: Andika
- Bakhsh: Central
- Rural District: Qaleh-ye Khvajeh

Population (2006)
  - Total: 202
- Time zone: UTC+3:30 (IRST)
  - Summer (DST): UTC+4:30 (IRDT)

Kham Karabad-e Galleh Tavak (Persian: خمكارابادگله توك, also Romanized as Kham Kārābād-e Galleh Tavak; also known as Kham Kārābād) is a village in Qaleh-ye Khvajeh Rural District, in the Central District of Andika County, Khuzestan Province, Iran. In the 2006 census, its recorded population was 202, including 39 families.
