= Taqha-ye Jafar Qoli =

Taqha-ye Jafar Qoli طاقهاي جعفرقلي
- Village
- Location within Iran
- Coordinates: 32°11′12″N 49°22′13″E
- Country: Iran
- Province: Khuzestan
- County: Andika
- Bakhsh: Central
- Rural District: Qaleh-ye Khvajeh

Population (2006)
  - Total: 33
- Time zone: UTC+3:30 (IRST)
  - Summer (DST): UTC+4:30 (IRDT)

Taqha-ye Jafar Qoli (Persian: طاقهاي جعفرقلي, also Romanized as Ţāqhā-ye Ja‘far Qolī and Ţāqā Ja‘far Qolī; also known as Bard Bedūl) is a village in Qaleh-ye Khvajeh Rural District, in the Central District of Andika County, Khuzestan Province, Iran. At the 2006 census, its population was 33, in 5 families.
