= Repi, Iran =

Repi رپي
- Village
- Location within Iran
- Coordinates: 32°14′47″N 49°49′36″E
- Country: Iran
- Province: Khuzestan
- County: Andika
- Bakhsh: Chelo
- Rural District: Chelo

Population (2006)
  - Total: 37
- Time zone: UTC+3:30 (IRST)
  - Summer (DST): UTC+4:30 (IRDT)

Repi (Persian: رپي, also Romanized as Repī) is a village in Chelo Rural District, Chelo District, Andika County, Khuzestan Province, Iran. At the 2006 census, its population was 37, in 7 families.
