= Tang-e Sanan =

Tang-e Sanan تنگ سنان
- Village
- Location within Iran
- Coordinates: 32°20′59″N 49°34′42″E
- Country: Iran
- Province: Khuzestan
- County: Andika
- Bakhsh: Chelo
- Rural District: Lalar and Katak

Population (2006)
  - Total: 114
- Time zone: UTC+3:30 (IRST)
  - Summer (DST): UTC+4:30 (IRDT)

Tang-e Sanan (Persian: تنگ سنان, also Romanized as Tang-e Sanān) is a village in Lalar and Katak Rural District, Chelo District, Andika County, Khuzestan Province, Iran. At the 2006 census, its population was 114, in 15 families.
