= Darreh-ye Arabha =

Darreh-ye Arabha دره عربها
- Village
- Location within Iran
- Coordinates: 32°04′09″N 49°31′23″E
- Country: Iran
- Province: Khuzestan
- County: Andika
- Bakhsh: Abezhdan
- Rural District: Kushk

Population (2006)
  - Total: 39
- Time zone: UTC+3:30 (IRST)
  - Summer (DST): UTC+4:30 (IRDT)

Darreh-ye Arabha (Persian: دره عربها, also Romanized as Darreh-ye 'Arabhā) is a village in Kushk Rural District, Abezhdan District, Andika County, Khuzestan province, Iran. At the 2006 census, its population was 39, in 7 families.
