= Sar Huni =

Sar Huni سرحوني
- Village
- Location within Iran
- Coordinates: 32°24′37″N 49°35′21″E
- Country: Iran
- Province: Khuzestan
- County: Andika
- Bakhsh: Chelo
- Rural District: Lalar and Katak

Population (2006)
  - Total: 133
- Time zone: UTC+3:30 (IRST)
  - Summer (DST): UTC+4:30 (IRDT)

Sar Huni (Persian: سرحوني, also Romanized as Sar Ḩūnī; also known as Sarḩānī) is a village in Lalar and Katak Rural District, Chelo District, Andika County, Khuzestan Province, Iran. At the 2006 census, its population was 133, in 19 families.
