= Rezachal Kenar =

Rezachal Kenar رضاچال كنار
- Village
- Country: Iran
- Province: Khuzestan
- County: Andika
- Bakhsh: Abezhdan
- Rural District: Abezhdan

Population (2006)
  - Total: 200
- Time zone: UTC+3:30 (IRST)
  - Summer (DST): UTC+4:30 (IRDT)

Rezachal Kenar (Persian: رضاچال كنار, also Romanized as Rez̤āchāl Kenār) is a village in Abezhdan Rural District, Abezhdan District, Andika County, Khuzestan Province, Iran. At the 2006 census, its population was 200, in 36 families.
