= Takht-e Meshkun =

Takht-e Meshkun تخت مشكون
- Village
- Country: Iran
- Province: Khuzestan
- County: Andika
- Bakhsh: Abezhdan
- Rural District: Kushk

Population (2006)
  - Total: 30
- Time zone: UTC+3:30 (IRST)
  - Summer (DST): UTC+4:30 (IRDT)

Takht-e Meshkun (Persian: تخت مشكون, also Romanized as Takht-e Meshkūn) is a village in Kushk Rural District, Abezhdan District, Andika County, Khuzestan Province, Iran. At the 2006 census, its population was 30, in 6 families.
