= Cheshmeh Chelvar =

Cheshmeh Chelvar چشمه چلوار
- Village
- Location within Iran
- Coordinates: 32°22′53″N 49°22′31″E
- Country: Iran
- Province: Khuzestan
- County: Andika
- Bakhsh: Central
- Rural District: Qaleh-ye Khvajeh

Population (2006)
  - Total: 341
- Time zone: UTC+3:30 (IRST)
  - Summer (DST): UTC+4:30 (IRDT)

Cheshmeh Chelvar (Persian: چشمه چلوار, also Romanized as Cheshmeh Chelvār; also known as Chelvār and Cholbār) is a village in Qaleh-ye Khvajeh Rural District, in the Central District of Andika County, Khuzestan Province, Iran. At the 2006 census, its population was 341, in 52 families.
