= Pay Rah-e Chal Balutak =

Pay Rah-e Chal Balutak پاي راه چال بلوتك
- Village
- Location within Iran
- Coordinates: 32°13′00″N 49°20′00″E
- Country: Iran
- Province: Khuzestan
- County: Andika
- Bakhsh: Central
- Rural District: Qaleh-ye Khvajeh

Population (2006)
  - Total: 76
- Time zone: UTC+3:30 (IRST)
  - Summer (DST): UTC+4:30 (IRDT)

Pay Rah-e Chal Balutak (Persian: پاي راه چال بلوتك, also Romanized as Pāy Rāh-e Chāl Balūţak) is a village in Qaleh-ye Khvajeh Rural District, in the Central District of Andika County, Khuzestan Province, Iran. At the 2006 census, its population was 76, in 12 families.
