= Darreh-ye Gandoli =

Darreh-ye Gandoli دره گندلي
- Village
- Country: Iran
- Province: Khuzestan
- County: Andika
- Bakhsh: Abezhdan
- Rural District: Kushk

Population (2006)
  - Total: 51
- Time zone: UTC+3:30 (IRST)
  - Summer (DST): UTC+4:30 (IRDT)

Darreh-ye Gandoli (Persian: دره گندلي, also Romanized as Darreh-ye Gandolī) is a village in Kushk Rural District, Abezhdan District, Andika County, Khuzestan Province, Iran. At the 2006 census, its population was 51, with 10 families.
