= Ab Kabud-e Sofla =

Ab Kabud-e Sofla ابكبودسفلي
- Village
- Location within Iran
- Coordinates: 32°27′50″N 49°32′16″E
- Country: Iran
- Province: Khuzestan
- County: Andika
- Bakhsh: Chelo
- Rural District: Lalar and Katak

Population (2006)
  - Total: 26
- Time zone: UTC+3:30 (IRST)
  - Summer (DST): UTC+4:30 (IRDT)

Ab Kabud-e Sofla (Persian: ابكبودسفلي, also Romanized as Āb Kabūd-e Soflá; also known as Ābkabūd) is a village in Lalar and Katak Rural District, Chelo District, Andika County, Khuzestan Province, Iran. At the 2006 census, its population was 26, in 6 families.
