= Kalbali Arab =

Kalbali Arab كلبعلي عرب
- Village
- Location within Iran
- Coordinates: 32°06′20″N 49°26′59″E
- Country: Iran
- Province: Khuzestan
- County: Andika
- Bakhsh: Abezhdan
- Rural District: Abezhdan

Population (2006)
  - Total: 105
- Time zone: UTC+3:30 (IRST)
  - Summer (DST): UTC+4:30 (IRDT)

Kalbali Arab (Persian: كلبعلي عرب, also Romanized as Kalb‘alī ‘Arab and Kalbalī ‘Arab) is a village in Abezhdan Rural District, Abezhdan District, Andika County, Khuzestan Province, Iran. At the 2006 census, its population was 105, in 18 families.
