= Seyyed Rajab =

Seyyed Rajab سيدرجب
- Village
- Location within Iran
- Coordinates: 32°03′00″N 49°24′00″E
- Country: Iran
- Province: Khuzestan
- County: Andika
- Bakhsh: Abezhdan
- Rural District: Abezhdan

Population (2006)
  - Total: 105
- Time zone: UTC+3:30 (IRST)
  - Summer (DST): UTC+4:30 (IRDT)

Seyyed Rajab (Persian: سيدرجب) is a village in Abezhdan Rural District, Abezhdan District, Andika County, Khuzestan Province, Iran. At the 2006 census, its population was 105, in 19 families.
