= Sar Gach =

Sar Gach (Persian: سرگچ) may refer to:

- Sar Gach, Andika, Khuzestan Province
- Sar Gach, Izeh, Khuzestan Province
- Sar Gach, Kohgiluyeh and Boyer-Ahmad

== See also ==
- Gach Sar
