= Saleh Kutah =

Saleh Kutah صالح كوتاه
- Village
- Location within Iran
- Coordinates: 32°03′32″N 49°30′25″E
- Country: Iran
- Province: Khuzestan
- County: Andika
- Bakhsh: Abezhdan
- Rural District: Abezhdan

Population (2006)
  - Total: 230
- Time zone: UTC+3:30 (IRST)
  - Summer (DST): UTC+4:30 (IRDT)

Saleh Kutah (Persian: صالح كوتاه, also Romanized as Şāleḩ Kūtāh and Saleh Kootah) is a village in Abezhdan Rural District, Abezhdan District, Andika County, Khuzestan Province, Iran. At the 2006 census, its population was 230, in 43 families.
