= Abezhdan, Andika (neighborhood) =

Neighborhood in Khuzestan province, Iran

Abezhdan Persian: ابژدان
- Neighborhood
- Location within Iran
- Coordinates: 32°04′05″N 49°27′42″E
- Country: Iran
- Province: Khuzestan
- County: Andika
- District: Abezhdan
- City: Abezhdan

Population (2011)
  - Total: 956
- Time zone: UTC+3:30 (IRST)

Abezhdan (Persian: ابژدان) (Note: Also romanized as Ābezhdān; also known as Ābezhdān-e Ābandar) is a neighborhood in the city of Abezhdan in Abezhdan District of Andika County, Khuzestan province, Iran.

== Demographics ==
=== Population ===
At the time of the 2006 National Census, Abezhdan's population was 789 in 146 households, when it was a village in Abezhdan Rural District of the former Andika District in Masjed Soleyman County. The following census in 2011 counted 956 people in 208 households, by which time the district had been separated from the county in the establishment of Andika County. The rural district was transferred to the new Abezhdan District.

After the census, the village of Jafarabad merged with the villages of Abezhdan, Naser Khosrow, Shahrak-e Yaser, and Yek Borji, and was elevated to city status as Abezhdan.
