= Takht-e Malek, Khuzestan =

Takht-e Malek تخت ملك
- Village
- Location within Iran
- Coordinates: 32°06′08″N 49°31′27″E
- Country: Iran
- Province: Khuzestan
- County: Andika
- Bakhsh: Abezhdan
- Rural District: Kushk

Population (2006)
  - Total: 191
- Time zone: UTC+3:30 (IRST)
  - Summer (DST): UTC+4:30 (IRDT)

Takht-e Malek (Persian: تخت ملك) is a village in Kushk Rural District, Abezhdan District, Andika County, Khuzestan Province, Iran. At the 2006 census, its population was 191, in 29 families.
