= Darreh Duzdan =

Darreh Duzdan or Darreh Dozdan or Darreh Dazdan or Darrehdozdan (Persian: دره دزدان) may refer to:

- Darreh Dozdan, Khuzestan
- Darreh Dazdan, Kohgiluyeh and Boyer-Ahmad
- Darreh Duzdan, Lorestan
