= Pol-e Negin =

Pol-e Negin پل نگين
- Village
- Location within Iran
- Coordinates: 32°20′26″N 49°37′29″E
- Country: Iran
- Province: Khuzestan
- County: Andika
- Bakhsh: Chelo
- Rural District: Lalar and Katak

Population (2006)
  - Total: 186
- Time zone: UTC+3:30 (IRST)
  - Summer (DST): UTC+4:30 (IRDT)

Pol-e Negin (Persian: پل نگين, also Romanized as Pol-e Negīn) is a village in Lalar and Katak Rural District, Chelo District, Andika County, Khuzestan Province, Iran. At the 2006 census, its population was 186, in 32 families.
