= Mandeniabad =

Mandeniabad مندني اباد
- Village
- Location within Iran
- Coordinates: 32°14′00″N 49°25′00″E
- Country: Iran
- Province: Khuzestan
- County: Andika
- Bakhsh: Central
- Rural District: Qaleh-ye Khvajeh

Population (2006)
  - Total: 41
- Time zone: UTC+3:30 (IRST)
  - Summer (DST): UTC+4:30 (IRDT)

Mandeniabad (Persian: مندني اباد, also Romanized as Mandenīābād) is a village in Qaleh-ye Khvajeh Rural District, in the Central District of Andika County, Khuzestan Province, Iran. At the 2006 census, its population was 41, in 6 families.
