= Karim Musa =

Iranian village

Karim Musa كريم موسي
- Village
- Location within Iran
- Coordinates: 32°12′21″N 49°30′24″E
- Country: Iran
- Province: Khuzestan
- County: Andika
- Bakhsh: Central
- Rural District: Qaleh-ye Khvajeh

Population (2006)
  - Total: 83
- Time zone: UTC+3:30 (IRST)
  - Summer (DST): UTC+4:30 (IRDT)

Karim Musa (Persian: كريم موسي, also Romanized as Karīm Mūsá) is a village in Qaleh-ye Khvajeh Rural District, in the Central District of Andika County, Khuzestan province, Iran. At the 2006 census, its population was 83, in 14 families.
