= Ab-e Mozhgan =

Ab-e Mozhgan اب مژگان
- Village
- Location within Iran
- Coordinates: 32°09′58″N 49°31′12″E
- Country: Iran
- Province: Khuzestan
- County: Andika
- Bakhsh: Abezhdan
- Rural District: Abezhdan

Population (2006)
  - Total: 109
- Time zone: UTC+3:30 (IRST)
  - Summer (DST): UTC+4:30 (IRDT)

Ab-e Mozhgan (Persian: اب مژگان, also Romanized as Āb-e Mozhgān) is a village in Abezhdan Rural District, Abezhdan District, Andika County, Khuzestan province, Iran. At the 2006 census, its population was 109, in 16 families.
