= Qaleh Sangar =

Qaleh Sangar قلعه سنگر
- Village
- Location within Iran
- Coordinates: 32°04′50″N 49°32′01″E
- Country: Iran
- Province: Khuzestan
- County: Andika
- Bakhsh: Abezhdan
- Rural District: Kushk

Population (2006)
  - Total: 117
- Time zone: UTC+3:30 (IRST)
  - Summer (DST): UTC+4:30 (IRDT)

Qaleh Sangar (Persian: قلعه سنگر, also Romanized as Qal‘eh Sangar; also known as Qalā Sangar) is a village in Kushk Rural District, Abezhdan District, Andika County, Khuzestan Province, Iran. At the 2006 census, its population was 117, in 24 families.
