= Ali Asghar Kutki =

Ali Asghar Kutki علي اصغركوتكي
- Village
- Country: Iran
- Province: Khuzestan
- County: Andika
- Bakhsh: Abezhdan
- Rural District: Abezhdan

Population (2006)
  - Total: 109
- Time zone: UTC+3:30 (IRST)
  - Summer (DST): UTC+4:30 (IRDT)

Ali Asghar Kutki (Persian: علي اصغركوتكي, also Romanized as ʿAlī Āṣghar Kūtḵī) is a village in Abezhdan Rural District, Abezhdan District, Andika County, Khuzestan Province, Iran. At the 2006 census, its population was 109, in 22 families.
