= Feyzollah =

Feyzollah فيض اله
- Village
- Location within Iran
- Coordinates: 32°03′00″N 49°25′00″E
- Country: Iran
- Province: Khuzestan
- County: Andika
- Bakhsh: Abezhdan
- Rural District: Abezhdan

Population (2006)
  - Total: 45
- Time zone: UTC+3:30 (IRST)
  - Summer (DST): UTC+4:30 (IRDT)

Feyzollah (Persian: فيض اله, also Romanized as Feyẕollāh) is a village in Abezhdan Rural District, Abezhdan District, Andika County, Khuzestan Province, Iran. At the 2006 census, its population was 45, in 8 families.
