= Tanag Lai =

Tanag Lai تنگ لايي
- Village
- Location within Iran
- Coordinates: 32°21′52″N 49°45′56″E
- Country: Iran
- Province: Khuzestan
- County: Andika
- Bakhsh: Chelo
- Rural District: Chelo

Population (2006)
  - Total: 56
- Time zone: UTC+3:30 (IRST)
  - Summer (DST): UTC+4:30 (IRDT)

Tanag Lai (Persian: تنگ لايي, also Romanized as Tanag Lā’ī and Tanak Lā’ī) is a village in Chelo Rural District, Chelo District, Andika County, Khuzestan Province, Iran. At the 2006 census, its population was 56, in 8 families.
