= Ab Qanat =

Ab Qanat اب قنات
- Village
- Location within Iran
- Coordinates: 32°09′21″N 49°33′47″E
- Country: Iran
- Province: Khuzestan
- County: Andika
- Bakhsh: Abezhdan
- Rural District: Kushk

Population (2006)
  - Total: 42
- Time zone: UTC+3:30 (IRST)
  - Summer (DST): UTC+4:30 (IRDT)

Ab Qanat (Persian: اب قنات, also Romanized as Āb Qanāt; also known as Abqanat) is a village in Kushk Rural District, Abezhdan District, Andika County, Khuzestan province, Iran. At the 2006 census, its population was 42, in 7 families.
