= Mafgeh =

Mafgeh مافگه
- Village
- Location within Iran
- Coordinates: 32°06′39″N 49°33′16″E
- Country: Iran
- Province: Khuzestan
- County: Andika
- Bakhsh: Abezhdan
- Rural District: Kushk

Population (2006)
  - Total: 346
- Time zone: UTC+3:30 (IRST)
  - Summer (DST): UTC+4:30 (IRDT)

Mafgeh (Persian: مافگه, also Romanized as Māfgeh; also known as Māfegā) is a village in Kushk Rural District, Abezhdan District, Andika County, Khuzestan Province, Iran. At the 2006 census, its population was 346, in 59 families.
