= Katak, Khuzestan =

Village in Khuzestan province, Iran

Katak Persian: كتك
- Village
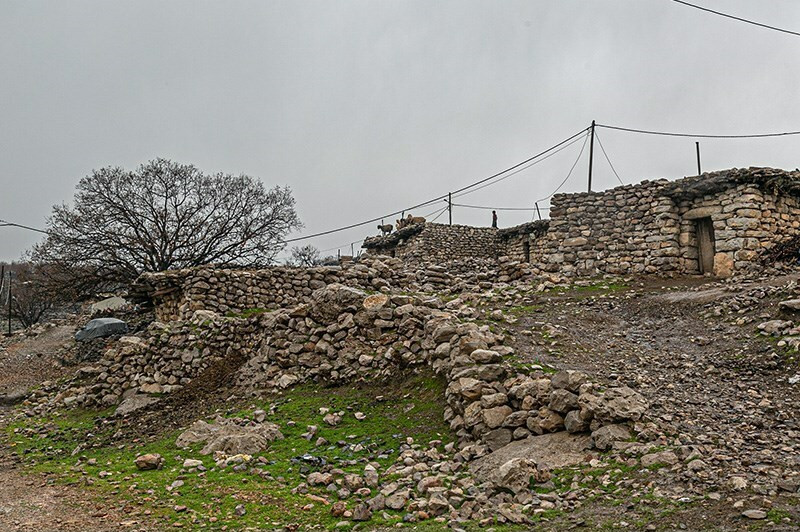
- Katak, Kuzhesthan

- Location within Iran
- Coordinates: 32°28′29″N 49°34′40″E
- Country: Iran
- Province: Khuzestan
- County: Andika
- District: Chelu
- Rural District: Lalar and Katak

Population (2016)
  - Total: 604
- Time zone: UTC+3:30 (IRST)

Katak (Persian: كتك) (Note: Also romanized as Kotok) is a village in, and the capital of, Lalar and Katak Rural District of Chelu District, Andika County, Khuzestan province, Iran.

== Demographics ==
=== Population ===
At the time of the 2006 National Census, the village's population was 638 in 110 households, when it was in the former Andika District of Masjed Soleyman County. The following census in 2011 counted 604 people in 111 households, by which time the district had been separated from the county in the establishment of Andika County. The rural district was transferred to the new Chelu District. The 2016 census measured the population of the village as 604 people in 145 households.
