= Zeyrcheshmeh-ye Ab Anari =

Zeyrcheshmeh-ye Ab Anari زيرچشمه اب اناري
- Village
- Country: Iran
- Province: Khuzestan
- County: Andika
- Bakhsh: Central
- Rural District: Qaleh-ye Khvajeh

Population (2006)
  - Total: 336
- Time zone: UTC+3:30 (IRST)
  - Summer (DST): UTC+4:30 (IRDT)

Zeyrcheshmeh-ye Ab Anari (Persian: زيرچشمه اب اناري, also Romanized as Zeyrcheshmeh-ye Āb Ānārī) is a village in Qaleh-ye Khvajeh Rural District, in the Central District of Andika County, Khuzestan Province, Iran. At the 2006 census, its population was 336, in 43 families.
