= Taherabad, Andika =

Village in Khuzestan province, Iran

Taherabad Persian: طاهراباد
- Village
- Location within Iran
- Coordinates: 32°13′07″N 49°31′07″E
- Country: Iran
- Province: Khuzestan
- County: Andika
- District: Central
- Rural District: Qaleh-ye Khvajeh

Population (2016)
  - Total: 652
- Time zone: UTC+3:30 (IRST)

Taherabad (Persian: طاهراباد) (Note: Also romanized as Ţāherābād) is a village in Qaleh-ye Khvajeh Rural District of the Central District of Andika County, Khuzestan province, Iran.

== Demographics ==
=== Population ===
At the time of the 2006 National Census, the village's population was 562 in 104 households, when it was in the former Andika District of Masjed Soleyman County. The following census in 2011 counted 658 people in 146 households, by which time the district had been separated from the county in the establishment of Andika County. The rural district was transferred to the new Central District. The 2016 census measured the population of the village as 652 people in 150 households. It was the most populous village in its rural district.
