= Ab Koreh =

Ab Koreh ابكره
- village
- Location within Iran
- Coordinates: 32°09′47″N 49°33′52″E
- Country: Iran
- Province: Khuzestan
- County: Andika
- Bakhsh: Abezhdan
- Rural District: Kushk

Population (2006)
  - Total: 148
- Time zone: UTC+3:30 (IRST)
  - Summer (DST): UTC+4:30 (IRDT)

Ab Koreh (Persian: ابكره, also Romanized as Āb Koreh and Āb Karreh) is a village in Kushk Rural District, Abezhdan District, Andika County, Khuzestan Province, Iran. At the 2006 census, its population was 148, in 20 families.
