= Sar Bazar =

Sar Bazar سربازار
- Village
- Location within Iran
- Coordinates: 32°19′53″N 49°46′19″E
- Country: Iran
- Province: Khuzestan
- County: Andika
- Bakhsh: Chelo
- Rural District: Chelo

Population (2006)
  - Total: 170
- Time zone: UTC+3:30 (IRST)
  - Summer (DST): UTC+4:30 (IRDT)

Sar Bazar (Persian: سربازار, also Romanized as Sar Bāzār) is a village in Chelo Rural District, Chelo District, Andika County, Khuzestan Province, Iran. At the 2006 census, its population was 170, in 30 families.
