= Shukol =

Shukol شوكل
- Village
- Location within Iran
- Coordinates: 32°05′17″N 49°28′43″E
- Country: Iran
- Province: Khuzestan
- County: Andika
- Bakhsh: Abezhdan
- Rural District: Abezhdan

Population (2006)
  - Total: 786
- Time zone: UTC+3:30 (IRST)
  - Summer (DST): UTC+4:30 (IRDT)

Shukol (Persian: شوكل, also Romanized as Shūkol and Shookol; also known as Shū Gol-e Ḩājjīvand and Shūkol Saragh) is a village in Abezhdan Rural District, Abezhdan District, Andika County, Khuzestan Province, Iran. At the 2006 census, its population was 786, in 134 families.
