= Lakabad =

Lakabad لك اباد
- Village
- Location within Iran
- Coordinates: 32°15′58″N 49°48′29″E
- Country: Iran
- Province: Khuzestan
- County: Andika
- Bakhsh: Chelo
- Rural District: Chelo

Population (2006)
  - Total: 22
- Time zone: UTC+3:30 (IRST)
  - Summer (DST): UTC+4:30 (IRDT)

Lakabad (Persian: لك اباد, also Romanized as Lakābād) is a village in Chelo Rural District, Chelo District, Andika County, Khuzestan Province, Iran. At the 2006 census, its population was 22, in 6 families.
