= Darb-e Shesh Ab =

Darb-e Shesh Ab درب شش اب
- Village
- Location within Iran
- Coordinates: 32°03′03″N 49°34′19″E
- Country: Iran
- Province: Khuzestan
- County: Andika
- Bakhsh: Abezhdan
- Rural District: Kushk

Population (2006)
  - Total: 34
- Time zone: UTC+3:30 (IRST)
  - Summer (DST): UTC+4:30 (IRDT)

Darb-e Shesh Ab (Persian: درب شش اب, also Romanized as Darb-e Shesh Āb; also known as Darv-e Shesh Āb) is a village in Kushk Rural District, Abezhdan District, Andika County, Khuzestan Province, Iran. At the 2006 census, its population was 34, in 7 families.
