= Shahrak-e Meysam =

Shahrak-e Meysam شهرك ميثم
- Village
- Country: Iran
- Province: Khuzestan
- County: Andika
- Bakhsh: Abezhdan
- Rural District: Abezhdan

Population (2006)
  - Total: 237
- Time zone: UTC+3:30 (IRST)
  - Summer (DST): UTC+4:30 (IRDT)

Shahrak-e Meysam (Persian: شهرك ميثم, also Romanized as Shahrak-e Meys̱am) is a village in Abezhdan Rural District, Abezhdan District, Andika County, Khuzestan Province, Iran. At the 2006 census, its population was 237, in 50 families.
