= Zangel Ab-e Deli =

Zangel Ab-e Deli زنگل اب دلي
- Village
- Location within Iran
- Coordinates: 32°17′23″N 49°28′00″E
- Country: Iran
- Province: Khuzestan
- County: Andika
- Bakhsh: Central
- Rural District: Qaleh-ye Khvajeh

Population (2006)
  - Total: 64
- Time zone: UTC+3:30 (IRST)
  - Summer (DST): UTC+4:30 (IRDT)

Zangel Ab-e Deli (Persian: زنگل اب دلي, also Romanized as Zangel Āb-e Delī; also known as Zangelāb) is a village in Qaleh-ye Khvajeh Rural District, in the Central District of Andika County, Khuzestan Province, Iran. At the 2006 census, its population was 64, in 10 families.
