= Latia, Iran =

Latia لاتيا
- Village
- Location within Iran
- Coordinates: 32°14′10″N 49°39′19″E
- Country: Iran
- Province: Khuzestan
- County: Andika
- Bakhsh: Central
- Rural District: Shalal and Dasht-e Gol

Population (2006)
  - Total: 23
- Time zone: UTC+3:30 (IRST)
  - Summer (DST): UTC+4:30 (IRDT)

Latia (Persian: لاتيا, also Romanized as Lātīā) is a village in Shalal and Dasht-e Gol Rural District, in the Central District of Andika County, Khuzestan Province, Iran. At the 2006 census, its population was 23, in 4 families.
