= Shahrak-e Mohammad Reza Asadpur =

Village in Khuzestan province, Iran

Shahrak-e Mohammad Reza Asadpur Persian: شهرك محمد رضا اسدپور
- Village
- Country: Iran
- Province: Khuzestan
- County: Andika
- District: Abezhdan
- Rural District: Abezhdan

Population (2016)
  - Total: 1,043
- Time zone: UTC+3:30 (IRST)

Shahrak-e Mohammad Reza Asadpur (Persian: شهرك محمدرضااسدپور) (Note: Also romanized as Shahrak-e Moḩammad Rez̤ā Āsadpūr) is a village in Abezhdan Rural District of Abezhdan District, Andika County, Khuzestan province, Iran.

== Demographics ==
=== Population ===
At the time of the 2006 National Census, the village's population was 1,045 in 167 households, when it was in the former Andika District of Masjed Soleyman County. The following census in 2011 counted 1,175 people in 222 households, by which time the district had been separated from the county in the establishment of Andika County. The rural district was transferred to the new Abezhdan District. The 2016 census measured the population of the village as 1,043 people in 248 households. It was the most populous village in its rural district.
