= Posht Chagah Taraz =

Posht Chagah Taraz پشت چگاه تاراز
- Village
- Country: Iran
- Province: Khuzestan
- County: Andika
- Bakhsh: Chelo
- Rural District: Chelo

Population (2006)
  - Total: 29
- Time zone: UTC+3:30 (IRST)
  - Summer (DST): UTC+4:30 (IRDT)

Posht Chagah Taraz (Persian: پشت چگاه تاراز, also Romanized as Posht Chagāh Tārāz) is a village in Chelo Rural District, Chelo District, Andika County, Khuzestan Province, Iran. At the 2006 census, its population was 29, in 5 families.
