= Parivachzab Andikayi =

Village in Khuzestan province, Iran

Parivachzab Andikayi Persian: پاریوچذب اندیکایی
- Village
- Country: Iran
- Province: Khuzestan
- County: Andika
- District: Central
- Rural District: Shalal and Dasht-e Gol

Population (2016)
  - Total: 315
- Time zone: UTC+3:30 (IRST)

Parivachzab Andikayi (Persian: پاريوچذبانديكايي (Note: Also Romanized as Pārīvach Ẕabāndī Kāyī) is a village in Shalal and Dasht-e Gol Rural District of the Central District of Andika County, Khuzestan province, Iran.

== Demographics ==
=== Population ===
At the time of the 2006 National Census, the village's population was 369 in 64 households, when it was in the former Andika District of Masjed Soleyman County. The following census in 2011 counted 541 people in 95 households, by which time the district had been separated from the county in the establishment of Andika County. The rural district was transferred to the new Central District. The 2016 census measured the population of the village as 315 people in 70 households. It was the most populous village in its rural district.
