= Takht-e Kabud =

Village in Khuzestan province, Iran

Takht-e Kabud تختكبود
- Village
- Country: Iran
- Province: Khuzestan
- County: Andika
- Bakhsh: Abezhdan
- Rural District: Kushk

Population (2006)
  - Total: 78
- Time zone: UTC+3:30 (IRST)
  - Summer (DST): UTC+4:30 (IRDT)

Takht-e Kabud (Persian: تختكبود, also Romanized as Takht-e Kabūd) is a village in Kushk Rural District, Abezhdan District, Andika County, Khuzestan province, Iran. At the 2006 census, its population was 78, in 11 families.
