= Ab Qaleh =

Ab Qaleh (Persian: اب قلعه) may refer to:

- Ab Qaleh, Khuzestan
- Ab Qaleh, alternate name of Darreh Qaleh, Khuzestan Province
- Ab Qaleh, Razavi Khorasan
