= Mazarandeh =

Mazarandeh مزارنده
- Village
- Location within Iran
- Coordinates: 32°06′30″N 49°23′18″E
- Country: Iran
- Province: Khuzestan
- County: Andika
- Bakhsh: Abezhdan
- Rural District: Abezhdan

Population (2006)
  - Total: 80
- Time zone: UTC+3:30 (IRST)
  - Summer (DST): UTC+4:30 (IRDT)

Mazarandeh (Persian: مزارنده, also Romanized as Mazārandeh and Mezārandeh) is a village in Abezhdan Rural District, Abezhdan District, Andika County, Khuzestan Province, Iran. At the 2006 census, its population was 80, in 13 families.
