= Chal-e Anjireh =

Chal-e Anjireh چال انجيره
- Village
- Location within Iran
- Coordinates: 32°22′10″N 49°35′41″E
- Country: Iran
- Province: Khuzestan
- County: Andika
- Bakhsh: Chelo
- Rural District: Lalar and Katak

Population (2006)
  - Total: 91
- Time zone: UTC+3:30 (IRST)
  - Summer (DST): UTC+4:30 (IRDT)

Chal-e Anjireh (Persian: چال انجيره, also Romanized as Chāl-e Ānjīreh; also known as Chāl-e Ānjīr) is a village in Lalar and Katak Rural District, Chelo District, Andika County, Khuzestan Province, Iran. At the 2006 census, its population was 91, in 13 families.
