= Shukol-e Sahan Ali =

Shukol-e Sahan Ali شوكل صحنعلي
- Village
- Country: Iran
- Province: Khuzestan
- County: Andika
- Bakhsh: Abezhdan
- Rural District: Kushk

Population (2006)
  - Total: 27
- Time zone: UTC+3:30 (IRST)
  - Summer (DST): UTC+4:30 (IRDT)

Shukol-e Sahan Ali (Persian: شوكل صحنعلي, also Romanized as Shūkol-e Şaḥan ʿAlī) is a village in Kushk Rural District, Abezhdan District, Andika County, Khuzestan Province, Iran. At the 2006 census, its population was 27, in 5 families.
