= Ab Razak =

Ab Razak اب رزك
- Village
- Country: Iran
- Province: Khuzestan
- County: Andika
- Bakhsh: Central
- Rural District: Qaleh-ye Khvajeh

Population (2006)
  - Total: 159
- Time zone: UTC+3:30 (IRST)
  - Summer (DST): UTC+4:30 (IRDT)

Ab Razak (Persian: اب رزك, also Romanized as Āb Razaḵ) is a village in Qaleh-ye Khvajeh Rural District, in the Central District of Andika County, Khuzestan province, Iran. At the 2006 census, its population was 159, in 20 families.
