= Kandgah =

Kandgah كندگاه
- Village
- Location within Iran
- Coordinates: 32°11′41″N 49°24′58″E
- Country: Iran
- Province: Khuzestan
- County: Andika
- Bakhsh: Central
- Rural District: Qaleh-ye Khvajeh

Population (2006)
  - Total: 33
- Time zone: UTC+3:30 (IRST)
  - Summer (DST): UTC+4:30 (IRDT)

Kandgah (Persian: كندگاه, also Romanized as Kandgāh; also known as Kandkāh and Shahrak-e Balāl) is a village in Qaleh-ye Khvajeh Rural District, in the Central District of Andika County, Khuzestan Province, Iran. At the 2006 census, its population was 33, in 7 families.
