= Tang Deh-ye Shalal =

Tang Deh-ye Shalal تنگده شلال
- Village
- Location within Iran
- Coordinates: 32°18′36″N 49°32′13″E
- Country: Iran
- Province: Khuzestan
- County: Andika
- Bakhsh: Central
- Rural District: Shalal and Dasht-e Gol

Population (2006)
  - Total: 83
- Time zone: UTC+3:30 (IRST)
  - Summer (DST): UTC+4:30 (IRDT)

Tang Deh-ye Shalal (Persian: تنگده شلال; also known as Tang Deh) is a village in Shalal and Dasht-e Gol Rural District, in the Central District of Andika County, Khuzestan Province, Iran. At the 2006 census, its population was 83, in 16 families.
