= Bazkabad, Khuzestan =

Bazkabad بزك اباد
- Village
- Location within Iran
- Coordinates: 32°08′07″N 49°23′29″E
- Country: Iran
- Province: Khuzestan
- County: Andika
- Bakhsh: Central
- Rural District: Qaleh-ye Khvajeh

Population (2006)
  - Total: 40
- Time zone: UTC+3:30 (IRST)
  - Summer (DST): UTC+4:30 (IRDT)

Bazkabad (Persian: بزك اباد, also Romanized as Bazkābād; also known as Bazgābād and Bozorgābād) is a village in Qaleh-ye Khvajeh Rural District, in the Central District of Andika County, Khuzestan Province, Iran. At the 2006 census, its population was 40, in 7 families.
