= Ragbi =

Ragbi رگبي
- Village
- Location within Iran
- Coordinates: 32°17′25″N 49°37′02″E
- Country: Iran
- Province: Khuzestan
- County: Andika
- Bakhsh: Central
- Rural District: Shalal and Dasht-e Gol

Population (2006)
  - Total: 21
- Time zone: UTC+3:30 (IRST)
  - Summer (DST): UTC+4:30 (IRDT)

Ragbi (Persian: رگبي, also Romanized as Ragbī and Regbī) is a village in Shalal and Dasht-e Gol Rural District, in the Central District of Andika County, Khuzestan Province, Iran. At the 2006 census, its population was 21, in 6 families.
