= Vargeh Sabztazeh =

Vargeh Sabztazeh وارگه سبزتازه
- Village
- Country: Iran
- Province: Khuzestan
- County: Andika
- Bakhsh: Central
- Rural District: Shalal and Dasht-e Gol

Population (2006)
  - Total: 337
- Time zone: UTC+3:30 (IRST)
  - Summer (DST): UTC+4:30 (IRDT)

Vargeh Sabztazeh (Persian: وارگه سبزتازه, also Romanized as Vārgeh Sabztāzeh) is a village in Shalal and Dasht-e Gol Rural District, in the Central District of Andika County, Khuzestan Province, Iran. At the 2006 census, its population was 337, in 67 families.
