= Qaleh Lut =

Qaleh Lut قلعه لوت
- Village
- Location within Iran
- Coordinates: 32°09′12″N 49°28′47″E
- Country: Iran
- Province: Khuzestan
- County: Andika
- Bakhsh: Abezhdan
- Rural District: Abezhdan

Population (2006)
  - Total: 147
- Time zone: UTC+3:30 (IRST)
  - Summer (DST): UTC+4:30 (IRDT)

Qaleh Lut (Persian: قلعه لوت, also Romanized as Qal‘eh Lūt and Qal‘eh-ye Lūt; also known as Ghal‘eh Loot) is a village in Abezhdan Rural District, Abezhdan District, Andika County, Khuzestan Province, Iran. At the 2006 census, its population was 147, in 22 families.
