= Darreh-ye Chinayi =

Darreh-ye Chinayi دره چينايي
- Village
- Country: Iran
- Province: Khuzestan
- County: Andika
- Bakhsh: Chelo
- Rural District: Chelo

Population (2006)
  - Total: 33
- Time zone: UTC+3:30 (IRST)
  - Summer (DST): UTC+4:30 (IRDT)

Darreh-ye Chinayi (Persian: دره چينايي, also Romanized as Darreh-ye Chīnāyī) is a village in Chelo Rural District, Chelo District, Andika County, Khuzestan Province, Iran. At the 2006 census, its population was 33, in 5 families.
