= Payrah Chal-e Monar =

Payrah Chal-e Monar پايراه چال منار
- Village
- Country: Iran
- Province: Khuzestan
- County: Andika
- Bakhsh: Chelo
- Rural District: Lalar and Katak

Population (2006)
  - Total: 83
- Time zone: UTC+3:30 (IRST)
  - Summer (DST): UTC+4:30 (IRDT)

Payrah Chal-e Monar (Persian: پايراه چال منار, also Romanized as Pāyrāh Chāl-e Monār) is a village in Lalar and Katak Rural District, Chelo District, Andika County, Khuzestan Province, Iran. At the 2006 census, its population was 83, in 11 families.
