= Ab Rizak =

Ab Rizak or Abrizak (Persian: ابريزك) may refer to:

- Ab Rizak, Bagh-e Malek, Khuzestan Province
- Abrizak, Kohgiluyeh and Boyer-Ahmad
- Ab Rizak, Lorestan

== See also ==
- Abrizaki (disambiguation)
