= Pacheh Kuh Zilay Idi =

Pacheh Kuh Zilay Idi پاچه كوه زيلاي عيدي
- Village
- Country: Iran
- Province: Khuzestan
- County: Andika
- Bakhsh: Chelo
- Rural District: Chelo

Population (2006)
  - Total: 26
- Time zone: UTC+3:30 (IRST)
  - Summer (DST): UTC+4:30 (IRDT)

Pacheh Kuh Zilay Idi (Persian: پاچه كوه زيلاي عيدي, also Romanized as Pācheh Kūh Zīlāy ʿĪdī) is a village in Chelo Rural District, Chelo District, Andika County, Khuzestan Province, Iran. At the 2006 census, its population was 26, in four families.
