= Sar Murd-e Isi =

Sar Murd-e Isi سرموردعيسي
- Village
- Country: Iran
- Province: Khuzestan
- County: Andika
- Bakhsh: Abezhdan
- Rural District: Abezhdan

Population (2006)
  - Total: 48
- Time zone: UTC+3:30 (IRST)
  - Summer (DST): UTC+4:30 (IRDT)

Sar Murd-e Isi (Persian: سرموردعيسي, also Romanized as Sar Mūrd-e ʿĪsī) is a village in Abezhdan Rural District, Abezhdan District, Andika County, Khuzestan Province, Iran. At the 2006 census, its population was 48, in 8 families.
