= Hasan Ali Darreh Forkh =

Hasan Ali Darreh Forkh حسنعلي دره فرخ
- Village
- Country: Iran
- Province: Khuzestan
- County: Andika
- Bakhsh: Chelo
- Rural District: Lalar and Katak

Population (2006)
  - Total: 51
- Time zone: UTC+3:30 (IRST)
  - Summer (DST): UTC+4:30 (IRDT)

Hasan Ali Darreh Forkh (Persian: حسنعلي دره فرخ, also Romanized as Ḩasan ʿAlī Darreh Forkh) is a village in Lalar and Katak Rural District, Chelo District, Andika County, Khuzestan Province, Iran. At the 2006 census, its population was 51, in 9 families.
