= Chal-e Monar =

Chal-e Monar چال منار
- Village
- Location within Iran
- Coordinates: 32°22′00″N 49°33′00″E
- Country: Iran
- Province: Khuzestan
- County: Andika
- Bakhsh: Chelo
- Rural District: Lalar and Katak

Population (2006)
  - Total: 126
- Time zone: UTC+3:30 (IRST)
  - Summer (DST): UTC+4:30 (IRDT)

Chal-e Monar (Persian: چال منار, also Romanized as Chāl-e Monār and Chal-i-Munār) is a village in Lalar and Katak Rural District, Chelo District, Andika County, Khuzestan Province, Iran. At the 2006 census, its population was 126, in 19 families.
