= Qaleh-ye Zaras =

Village in Khuzestan, Iran

Qaleh-ye Zaras قلعه زراس
- Village
- Location within Iran
- Coordinates: 32°09′03″N 49°21′50″E
- Country: Iran
- Province: Khuzestan
- County: Andika
- Bakhsh: Central
- Rural District: Qaleh-ye Khvajeh

Population (2006)
  - Total: 291
- Time zone: UTC+3:30 (IRST)
  - Summer (DST): UTC+4:30 (IRDT)

Qaleh-ye Zaras (Persian: قلعه زراس, also Romanized as Qal‘eh-ye Zarās, Qal‘eh Zarās, and Qal‘eh Zarrās; also known as Ghal’eh Zaras) is a village in Qaleh-ye Khvajeh Rural District, in the Central District of Andika County, Khuzestan Province, Iran. At the 2006 census, its population was 291, in 49 families.
