= Chal-e Sangha =

Chal-e Sangha چال سنگها
- Village
- Country: Iran
- Province: Khuzestan
- County: Andika
- Bakhsh: Chelo
- Rural District: Lalar and Katak

Population (2006)
  - Total: 88
- Time zone: UTC+3:30 (IRST)
  - Summer (DST): UTC+4:30 (IRDT)

Chal-e Sangha (Persian: چال سنگها, also Romanized as Chāl-e Sanghā) is a village in Lalar and Katak Rural District, Chelo District, Andika County, Khuzestan Province, Iran. In the 2006 census, its population was 88, in fourteen families.
