= Shahu-ye Garatin =

Shahu-ye Garatin شهوگرتين
- Village
- Location within Iran
- Coordinates: 32°10′53″N 49°26′02″E
- Country: Iran
- Province: Khuzestan
- County: Andika
- Bakhsh: Central
- Rural District: Qaleh-ye Khvajeh

Population (2006)
  - Total: 51
- Time zone: UTC+3:30 (IRST)
  - Summer (DST): UTC+4:30 (IRDT)

Shahu-ye Garatin (Persian: شهوگرتين, also Romanized as Shāhū-ye Garatīn) is a village in Qaleh-ye Khvajeh Rural District, in the Central District of Andika County, Khuzestan Province, Iran. At the 2006 census, its population was 51, in 11 families.
