= Kabak Mohammad Reza =

Kabak Mohammad Reza كبك محمدرضا
- Village
- Country: Iran
- Province: Khuzestan
- County: Andika
- Bakhsh: Chelo
- Rural District: Lalar and Katak

Population (2006)
  - Total: 102
- Time zone: UTC+3:30 (IRST)
  - Summer (DST): UTC+4:30 (IRDT)

Kabak Mohammad Reza (Persian: كبك محمدرضا, also Romanized as Kabak Moḩammad Rez̤ā) is a village in Lalar and Katak Rural District, Chelo District, Andika County, Khuzestan Province, Iran. At the 2006 census, its population was 102, in 16 families.
