= Sar Kandeh-ye Pain =

Sar Kandeh-ye Pain سركنده پايين
- Village
- Location within Iran
- Coordinates: 32°17′12″N 49°35′15″E
- Country: Iran
- Province: Khuzestan
- County: Andika
- Bakhsh: Central
- Rural District: Shalal and Dasht-e Gol

Population (2006)
  - Total: 24
- Time zone: UTC+3:30 (IRST)
  - Summer (DST): UTC+4:30 (IRDT)

Sar Kandeh-ye Pain (Persian: سركنده پايين, also Romanized as Sar Kandeh-ye Pā’īn; also known as Sar Kandeh) is a village in Shalal and Dasht-e Gol Rural District, in the Central District of Andika County, Khuzestan Province, Iran. At the 2006 census, its population was 24, in 5 families.
