= Ferdowsabad =

Ferdowsabad فردوس اباد
- Village
- Location within Iran
- Coordinates: 32°13′12″N 49°30′47″E
- Country: Iran
- Province: Khuzestan
- County: Andika
- Bakhsh: Central
- Rural District: Qaleh-ye Khvajeh

Population (2006)
  - Total: 231
- Time zone: UTC+3:30 (IRST)
  - Summer (DST): UTC+4:30 (IRDT)

Ferdowsabad (Persian: فردوس اباد, also Romanized as Ferdowsābād) is a village in Qaleh-ye Khvajeh Rural District, in the Central District of Andika County, Khuzestan Province, Iran. At the 2006 census, its population was 231, in 44 families. فردوس آباد روستایی در بخش مرکزی شهرستان اندیکا می باشد
