= Sabzlikeh Savarali =

Sabzlikeh Savarali سبزليكه سوارعلي
- Village
- Country: Iran
- Province: Khuzestan
- County: Andika
- Bakhsh: Chelo
- Rural District: Chelo

Population (2006)
  - Total: 20
- Time zone: UTC+3:30 (IRST)
  - Summer (DST): UTC+4:30 (IRDT)

Sabzlikeh Savarali (Persian: سبزليكه سوارعلي, also Romanized as Sabzlīkeh Savārʿalī) is a village in Chelo Rural District, Chelo District, Andika County, Khuzestan Province, Iran. At the 2006 census, its population was 20, in 4 families.
