= Chal-e Kuchek Latif Allah =

Chal-e Kuchek Latif Allah چال کوچک لطف‌اله
- Village
- Country: Iran
- Province: Khuzestan
- County: Andika
- Bakhsh: Central
- Rural District: Qaleh-ye Khvajeh

Population (2006)
  - Total: 64
- Time zone: UTC+3:30 (IRST)
  - Summer (DST): UTC+4:30 (IRDT)

Chal-e Kuchek Latif Allah (Persian: چال کوچک لطف‌اله, also Romanized as Chāl-e Kūchek Laṭif Allah) is a village in Qaleh-ye Khvajeh Rural District, in the Central District of Andika County, Khuzestan Province, Iran. At the 2006 census, its population was 64, in 13 families.
