= Ab Chahru =

Ab Chahru اب چهرو
- Village
- Location within Iran
- Coordinates: 32°08′34″N 49°30′37″E
- Country: Iran
- Province: Khuzestan
- County: Andika
- Bakhsh: Abezhdan
- Rural District: Abezhdan

Population (2006)
  - Total: 278
- Time zone: UTC+3:30 (IRST)
  - Summer (DST): UTC+4:30 (IRDT)

Ab Chahru (Persian: اب چهرو, also Romanized as Āb Chahrū and Āb-e Chahrū; also known as Āb Chārū and Rūstā-ye Shahīd Kāz̧emī) is a village in Abezhdan Rural District, Abezhdan District, Andika County, Khuzestan Province, Iran. At the 2006 census, its population was 278, in 40 families.
