= Mashgiri =

Mashgiri ماشگيري
- Village
- Location within Iran
- Coordinates: 32°10′13″N 49°28′22″E
- Country: Iran
- Province: Khuzestan
- County: Andika
- Bakhsh: Central
- Rural District: Qaleh-ye Khvajeh

Population (2006)
  - Total: 167
- Time zone: UTC+3:30 (IRST)
  - Summer (DST): UTC+4:30 (IRDT)

Mashgiri (Persian: ماشگيري, also Romanized as Māshgīrī; also known as Mushgari, Mūshgīrī, and Mūsh Gīrī) is a village in Qaleh-ye Khvajeh Rural District, in the Central District of Andika County, Khuzestan Province, Iran. At the 2006 census, its population was 167, in 30 families.
