= Kardef =

Coordinates: 32.4161°N 49.6975°E

Kardef كردف
- Village
- Interactive map of Kardef
- Country: Iran
- Province: Khuzestan
- County: Andika
- Bakhsh: Chelo
- Rural District: Chelo

Population (2006)
  - Total: 304
- Time zone: UTC+3:30 (IRST)
  - Summer (DST): UTC+4:30 (IRDT)

Kardef (Persian: كردف) is a village in Chelo Rural District, Chelo District, Andika County, Khuzestan Province, Iran. At the 2006 census, its population was 304, in 40 families.
