= Kuh Borideh Shelal =

Kuh Borideh Shelal كوه بريده شلال
- Village
- Location within Iran
- Coordinates: 32°17′56″N 49°33′05″E
- Country: Iran
- Province: Khuzestan
- County: Andika
- Bakhsh: Central
- Rural District: Shalal and Dasht-e Gol

Population (2006)
  - Total: 126
- Time zone: UTC+3:30 (IRST)
  - Summer (DST): UTC+4:30 (IRDT)

Kuh Borideh Shelal (Persian: كوه بريده شلال, also Romanized as Kūh Borīdeh Shelāl; also known as Kūh Borīdeh) is a village in Shalal and Dasht-e Gol Rural District, in the Central District of Andika County, Khuzestan Province, Iran. At the 2006 census, its population was 126, in 19 families.
