= Sarpar Abejdan =

Sarpar Abejdan سرپرابجدان
- Village
- Location within Iran
- Coordinates: 32°09′22″N 49°24′12″E
- Country: Iran
- Province: Khuzestan
- County: Andika
- Bakhsh: Central
- Rural District: Qaleh-ye Khvajeh

Population (2006)
  - Total: 83
- Time zone: UTC+3:30 (IRST)
  - Summer (DST): UTC+4:30 (IRDT)

Sarpar Abejdan (Persian: سرپرابجدان, also Romanized as Sarpar Ābejdān, Sarpar Ābezhdān, and Sarper Ābejdān) is a village in Qaleh-ye Khvajeh Rural District, in the Central District of Andika County, Khuzestan Province, Iran. At the 2006 census, its population was 83, in 15 families.
