= Kul Sorkh =

Kul Sorkh or Kul-e Sorkh (Persian: كول سرخ) may refer to:

- Kul Sorkh, Chaharmahal and Bakhtiari
- Kul Sorkh, Khuzestan
- Kul Sorkh-e Lirasad, Khuzestan Province
