= Chal-e Direh Bozorg =

Chal-e Direh Bozorg چال ديره بزرگ
- Village
- Country: Iran
- Province: Khuzestan
- County: Andika
- Bakhsh: Chelo
- Rural District: Lalar and Katak

Population (2006)
  - Total: 88
- Time zone: UTC+3:30 (IRST)
  - Summer (DST): UTC+4:30 (IRDT)

Chal-e Direh Bozorg (Persian: چال ديره بزرگ, also Romanized as Chāl-e Dīreh Bozorg) is a village in Lalar and Katak Rural District, Chelo District, Andika County, Khuzestan Province, Iran. At the 2006 census, its population was 88, in 16 families.
