= Pa Ab-e Shelal =

Village in Khuzestan province, Iran

Pa Ab-e Shelal Persian: پا آب شلال
- Village
- Location within Iran
- Coordinates: 32°17′37″N 49°33′55″E
- Country: Iran
- Province: Khuzestan
- County: Andika
- District: Central
- Rural District: Shalal and Dasht-e Gol

Population (2016)
  - Total: 172
- Time zone: UTC+3:30 (IRST)

Pa Ab-e Shelal (Persian: پا آب شلال) (Note: Also romanized as Pā Āb-e Shelāl; also known as Shalāl) is a village in, and the capital of, Shalal and Dasht-e Gol Rural District of the Central District of Andika County, Khuzestan province, Iran.

== Demographics ==
=== Population ===
At the time of the 2006 National Census, the village's population was 308 in 62 households, when it was in the former Andika District of Masjed Soleyman County. The following census in 2011 counted 146 people in 36 households, by which time the district had been separated from the county in the establishment of Andika County. The rural district was transferred to the new Central District. The 2016 census measured the population of the village as 172 people in 46 households.
