= Emamzadeh Bowyer =

Emamzadeh Bowyer امام زاده بوير
- Village
- Location within Iran
- Coordinates: 32°21′26″N 49°30′33″E
- Country: Iran
- Province: Khuzestan
- County: Andika
- Bakhsh: Central
- Rural District: Shalal and Dasht-e Gol

Population (2006)
  - Total: 102
- Time zone: UTC+3:30 (IRST)
  - Summer (DST): UTC+4:30 (IRDT)

Emamzadeh Bowyer (Persian: امام زاده بوير, also Romanized as Emāmzādeh Bowyer) is a village in Shalal and Dasht-e Gol Rural District, in the Central District of Andika County, Khuzestan Province, Iran. At the 2006 census, its population was 102, in 22 families.
