= Qaleh Barun =

Qaleh Barun قلعه برون
- Village
- Location within Iran
- Coordinates: 32°08′48″N 49°32′32″E
- Country: Iran
- Province: Khuzestan
- County: Andika
- Bakhsh: Abezhdan
- Rural District: Kushk

Population (2006)
  - Total: 323
- Time zone: UTC+3:30 (IRST)
  - Summer (DST): UTC+4:30 (IRDT)

Qaleh Barun (Persian: قلعه برون, also Romanized as Qal‘eh Barūn and Qal‘eh Berūn; also known as Ghal‘eh Baran, Qal’eh Barān, Qal‘eh Barān, and Qal‘eh Berān) is a village in Kushk Rural District, Abezhdan District, Andika County, Khuzestan Province, Iran. At the 2006 census, its population was 323, in 60 families.
