= Bazargarah Molla Aqa =

Bazargarah Molla Aqa بزرگراه ملااقا
- Village
- Country: Iran
- Province: Khuzestan
- County: Andika
- Bakhsh: Chelo
- Rural District: Chelo

Population (2006)
  - Total: 75
- Time zone: UTC+3:30 (IRST)
  - Summer (DST): UTC+4:30 (IRDT)

Bazargarah Molla Aqa (Persian: بزرگراه ملااقا, also Romanized as Bazargarāh Mollā Āqā) is a village in Chelo Rural District, Chelo District, Andika County, Khuzestan Province, Iran. At the 2006 census, its population was 75, in 15 families.
