= Sarchul =

Sarchul (Persian: سرچول) may refer to:

- Sarchul, Andika
- Sarchul, Dezful
