= Gelalak (32°21′ N 49°47′ E), Andika =

Gelalak گلالك
- Village
- Location within Iran
- Coordinates: 32°20′52″N 49°46′51″E
- Country: Iran
- Province: Khuzestan
- County: Andika
- Bakhsh: Chelo
- Rural District: Chelo

Population (2006)
  - Total: 184
- Time zone: UTC+3:30 (IRST)
  - Summer (DST): UTC+4:30 (IRDT)

Gelalak (Persian: گلالك, also Romanized as Gelālak) is a village in Chelo Rural District, Chelo District, Andika County, Khuzestan Province, Iran. At the 2006 census, its population was 184, in 25 families.
