= Abeshdun =

Abeshdun (Persian: ابژدان may refer to:

- Abeshdun-e Olya
- Abeshdun-e Sofla
