= Do Balutan =

Do Balutan or Dobalootan or Do Ballutan (Persian: دوبلوطان) may refer to:

- Do Balutan, Andika
- Do Balutan, Izeh
- Do Balutan, Masjed Soleyman
