= Ab Qaleh, Khuzestan =

Ab Qaleh اب قلعه
- Village
- Location within Iran
- Coordinates: 32°02′41″N 49°28′49″E
- Country: Iran
- Province: Khuzestan
- County: Andika
- Bakhsh: Abezhdan
- Rural District: Abezhdan

Population (2006)
  - Total: 161
- Time zone: UTC+3:30 (IRST)
  - Summer (DST): UTC+4:30 (IRDT)

Ab Qaleh (Persian: اب قلعه, also Romanized as Āb Qal‘eh) is a village in Abezhdan Rural District, Abezhdan District, Andika County, Khuzestan province, Iran. At the 2006 census, its population was 161, in 36 families.
