= Dulenjan-e Peyvandi =

Dulenjan-e Peyvandi may refer to:

- Dulgan
- Dulijan
