= Sar Howz-e Bala =

Sar Howz-e Bala سرحوض بالا
- Village
- Location within Iran
- Coordinates: 32°17′26″N 49°35′02″E
- Country: Iran
- Province: Khuzestan
- County: Andika
- Bakhsh: Central
- Rural District: Shalal and Dasht-e Gol

Population (2006)
  - Total: 77
- Time zone: UTC+3:30 (IRST)
  - Summer (DST): UTC+4:30 (IRDT)

Sar Howz-e Bala (Persian: سرحوض بالا, also Romanized as Sar Ḩowẕ-e Bālā) is a village in Shalal and Dasht-e Gol Rural District, in the Central District of Andika County, Khuzestan Province, Iran. At the 2006 census, its population was 77, in 14 families.
