= Darreh Qaleh =

Darreh Qaleh دره قلعه
- Village
- Location within Iran
- Coordinates: 32°09′04″N 49°29′20″E
- Country: Iran
- Province: Khuzestan
- County: Andika
- Bakhsh: Abezhdan
- Rural District: Abezhdan

Population (2006)
  - Total: 31
- Time zone: UTC+3:30 (IRST)
  - Summer (DST): UTC+4:30 (IRDT)

Darreh Qaleh (Persian: دره قلعه, also Romanized as Darreh Qal‘eh; also known as Āb Qal‘eh, Asadābād, Nowz̄arābād-e Āb Qal‘eh, and Shahrak-e Abūzār) is a village in Abezhdan Rural District, Abezhdan District, Andika County, Khuzestan province, Iran. At the 2006 census, its population was 31, in 5 families.
