= Do Balutan, Andika =

Do Balutan دوبلوطان
- Village
- Location within Iran
- Coordinates: 32°07′44″N 49°29′07″E
- Country: Iran
- Province: Khuzestan
- County: Andika
- Bakhsh: Abezhdan
- Rural District: Abezhdan

Population (2006)
  - Total: 202
- Time zone: UTC+3:30 (IRST)
  - Summer (DST): UTC+4:30 (IRDT)

Do Balutan (Persian: دوبلوطان, also Romanized as Do Balūţān; also known as Do Ballūţān-e Andīkā and Dobalootan Andika) is a village in Abezhdan Rural District, Abezhdan District, Andika County, Khuzestan Province, Iran. At the 2006 census, its population was 202, in 26 families.
