= Darreh Dozdan, Khuzestan =

Darreh Dozdan دره دزدان
- Village
- Location within Iran
- Coordinates: 32°01′24″N 49°46′30″E
- Country: Iran
- Province: Khuzestan
- County: Andika
- Bakhsh: Central
- Rural District: Shalal and Dasht-e Gol

Population (2006)
  - Total: 57
- Time zone: UTC+3:30 (IRST)
  - Summer (DST): UTC+4:30 (IRDT)

Darreh Dozdan (Persian: دره دزدان, also Romanized as Darreh Dozdān and Darrehdozdān) is a village in Shalal and Dasht-e Gol Rural District, in the Central District of Andika County, Khuzestan Province, Iran. At the 2006 census, its population was 57, in 11 families.
