= Abrizaki =

Abrizaki (Persian: ابريزكي) may refer to:

- Abrizaki, Andika
- Abrizaki, Izeh

== See also ==
- Abrizak (disambiguation)
