= Dulgan =

Dulgan دولگان
- Village
- Location within Iran
- Coordinates: 32°07′53″N 49°25′33″E
- Country: Iran
- Province: Khuzestan
- County: Andika
- Bakhsh: Abezhdan
- Rural District: Abezhdan

Population (2006)
  - Total: 16
- Time zone: UTC+3:30 (IRST)
  - Summer (DST): UTC+4:30 (IRDT)

Dulgan (Persian: دولگان, also Romanized as Dūlgān and Dūlogān; also known as Dūlenjān-e Peyvandī and Dūlūgān) is a village in Abezhdan Rural District, Abezhdan District, Andika County, Khuzestan Province, Iran. At the 2006 census, its population was 16, in 4 families.
