= Abrizaki, Andika =

Abrizaki ابريزكي
- Village
- Location within Iran
- Coordinates: 31°56′12″N 49°34′29″E
- Country: Iran
- Province: Khuzestan
- County: Andika
- Bakhsh: Abezhdan
- Rural District: Kushk

Population (2006)
  - Total: 52
- Time zone: UTC+3:30 (IRST)
  - Summer (DST): UTC+4:30 (IRDT)

Abrizaki (Persian: ابريزكي, also Romanized as Ābrīzakī) is a village in Kushk Rural District, Abezhdan District, Andika County, Khuzestan Province, Iran. At the 2006 census, its population was 52, in 9 families.
