= Pay Takht =

Pay Takht (Persian: پايتخت) may refer to:

- Pay Takht-e Varzard
- Pay Takht-e Zal
