= Kushkak-e Kushk =

Village in Khuzestan province, Iran

Kushkak-e Kushk Persian: كوشكك كوشك
- Village
- Location within Iran
- Coordinates: 32°05′16″N 49°34′26″E
- Country: Iran
- Province: Khuzestan
- County: Andika
- District: Abezhdan
- Rural District: Kushk

Population (2016)
  - Total: 2,240
- Time zone: UTC+3:30 (IRST)

Kushkak-e Kushk (Persian: كوشكك كوشك) (Note: Also romanized as Kūshkak-e Kūshk) is a village in Kushk Rural District, Abezhdan District, Andika County, Khuzestan province, Iran.

== Demographics ==
=== Population ===
At the time of the 2006 National Census, the village's population was 2,328 in 434 households, when it was in the former Andika District of Masjed Soleyman County. The following census in 2011 counted 2,766 people in 592 households, by which time the district had been separated from the county in the establishment of Andika County. The rural district was transferred to the new Abezhdan District. The 2016 census measured the population of the village as 2,240 people in 542 households. It was the most populous village in its rural district.
