= Kushk, Khuzestan =

Village in Khuzestan province, Iran

Keveshk Persian: كوشك
- Village
- Location within Iran
- Coordinates: 32°04′58″N 49°35′05″E
- Country: Iran
- Province: Khuzestan
- County: Andika
- District: Abezhdan
- Rural District: Keveshk

Population (2016)
  - Total: 158
- Time zone: UTC+3:30 (IRST)

Keveshk (Persian: كوشك) (Note: Also romanized as Keveshk and Keveshk; also known as Emām Şādeq) is a village in, and the capital of, Keveshk Rural District, Abezhdan District, Andika County, Khuzestan province, Iran.

== Demographics ==
=== Population ===
At the time of the 2006 National Census, the village's population was 262 in 56 households, when it was in the former Andika District of Masjed Soleyman County. The following census in 2011 counted 222 people in 58 households, by which time the district had been separated from the county in the establishment of Andika County. The rural district was transferred to the new Abezhdan District. The 2016 census measured the population of the village as 158 people in 42 households.
