= Abezhdan-e Malmulil =

Abezhdan-e Malmulil ابژدان ملموليل
- Village
- Location within Iran
- Coordinates: 32°03′00″N 49°27′00″E
- Country: Iran
- Province: Khuzestan
- County: Andika
- Bakhsh: Abezhdan
- Rural District: Abezhdan

Population (2006)
  - Total: 177
- Time zone: UTC+3:30 (IRST)
  - Summer (DST): UTC+4:30 (IRDT)

Abezhdan-e Malmulil (Persian: ابژدان ملموليل, also Romanized as Ābezhdān-e Malmūlīl; also known as Ābezhdān-e Malmūlīn) is a village in Abezhdan Rural District, Abezhdan District, Andika County, Khuzestan Province, Iran. At the 2006 census, its population was 177, in 34 families.
