= Dulijan =

Dulijan دوليجان
- Village
- Location within Iran
- Coordinates: 32°07′29″N 49°25′03″E
- Country: Iran
- Province: Khuzestan
- County: Andika
- Bakhsh: Abezhdan
- Rural District: Abezhdan

Population (2006)
  - Total: 27
- Time zone: UTC+3:30 (IRST)
  - Summer (DST): UTC+4:30 (IRDT)

Dulijan (Persian: دوليجان, also Romanized as Dūlījān; also known as Dūlenjān-e Peyvandī) is a village in Abezhdan Rural District, Abezhdan District, Andika County, Khuzestan Province, Iran. At the 2006 census, its population was 27, in 8 families.
