= Sar Howz =

Sar Howz (Persian: سرحوض) may refer to:

- Sar Howz-e Bala
- Sar Howz-e Pain
