= Lalar =

Village in Khuzestan province, Iran

Lalar Persian: للر
- Village
- Location within Iran
- Coordinates: 32°28′08″N 49°36′25″E
- Country: Iran
- Province: Khuzestan
- County: Andika
- District: Chelu
- Rural District: Lalar and Katak

Population (2016)
  - Total: 636
- Time zone: UTC+3:30 (IRST)

Lalar (Persian: للر) is a village in Lalar and Katak Rural District of Chelu District, Andika County, Khuzestan province, Iran.

== Demographics ==
=== Population ===
At the time of the 2006 National Census, the village's population was 517 in 103 households, when it was in the former Andika District of Masjed Soleyman County. The following census in 2011 counted 818 people in 169 households, by which time the district had been separated from the county in the establishment of Andika County. The rural district was transferred to the new Chelu District. The 2016 census measured the population of the village as 636 people in 149 households. It was the most populous village in its rural district.
