= Gelalak (32°23′ N 49°43′ E), Andika =

Gelalak گلالك
- Village
- Location within Iran
- Coordinates: 32°22′58″N 49°43′07″E
- Country: Iran
- Province: Khuzestan
- County: Andika
- Bakhsh: Chelo
- Rural District: Chelo

Population (2006)
  - Total: 62
- Time zone: UTC+3:30 (IRST)
  - Summer (DST): UTC+4:30 (IRDT)

Gelalak (Persian: گلالك, also Romanized as Gelālak) is a village in Chelo Rural District, Chelo District, Andika County, Khuzestan Province, Iran. At the 2006 census, its population was 62, in 10 families.
