= Chol Chol =

Chol Chol may refer to:

- Chol Chol Chal, a village in Khuzestan Province, Iran
- Cholchol River, a river in Chile
- Cholchol, a Chilean town at the river Cholchol
