= Zavut =

City in Khuzestan province, Iran

Zavut Persian: زاووت
- City
- Location within Iran
- Coordinates: 32°24′11″N 49°41′20″E
- Country: Iran
- Province: Khuzestan
- County: Andika
- District: Chelu

Population (2016)
  - Total: 1,031
- Time zone: UTC+3:30 (IRST)

Zavut (Persian: زاووت) (Note: Also romanized as Zāvūt; also known as Zabut; also romanized as Zābūt) is a city in, and the capital of, Chelu District, Andika County, Khuzestan province, Iran. It also serves as the administrative center for Chelu Rural District.

== Demographics ==
=== Population ===
At the time of the 2006 National Census, Zavut's population was 563 in 86 households, when it was a village in Chelu Rural District of the former Andika District of Masjed Soleyman County. The following census in 2011 counted 838 people in 158 households, by which time the district had been separated from the county in the establishment of Andika County. The rural district was transferred to the new Chelu District. The 2016 census measured the population of the village as 1,031 people in 201 households. It was the most populous village in its rural district.

After the census, Zavut was elevated to the status of a city.
