= Abezhdan, Andika (city) =

City in Khuzestan province, Iran

Abezhdan Persian: ابژدان
- City
- Location within Iran
- Coordinates: 32°03′56″N 49°27′16″E
- Country: Iran
- Province: Khuzestan
- County: Andika
- District: Abezhdan

Population (2016)
  - Total: 1,673
- Time zone: UTC+3:30 (IRST)

Abezhdan (Persian: ابژدان) (Note: Formerly the village of Jafarabad, also romanized as Ja‘farābād) is a city in, and the capital of, Abezhdan District of Andika County, Khuzestan province, Iran. It also serves as the administrative center for Abezhdan Rural District.

== Demographics ==
=== Population ===
At the time of the 2006 National Census, the population (as the village of Jafarabad) was 1,021 in 196 households, when it was in Abezhdan Rural District of the former Andika District of Masjed Soleyman County. The following census in 2011 counted 1,107 people in 253 households, by which time the district had been separated from the county in the establishment of Andika County. The rural district was transferred to the new Abezhdan District. The 2016 census measured the population as 1,673 inhabitants in 420 households, by which time the village had merged with the villages of Abezhdan, Naser Khosrow, Shahrak-e Yaser, and Yek Borji. Jafarabad was elevated to city status as Abezhdan.
