= Sar Gach, Andika =

Sar Gach سرگچ
- Village
- Location within Iran
- Coordinates: 32°04′35″N 49°29′15″E
- Country: Iran
- Province: Khuzestan
- County: Andika
- Bakhsh: Abezhdan
- Rural District: Abezhdan

Population (2006)
  - Total: 1,239
- Time zone: UTC+3:30 (IRST)
  - Summer (DST): UTC+4:30 (IRDT)

Sar Gach (Persian: سرگچ; also known as Ābezhdān, Sar Gach-e Ābezhdān, Shūkol-e Sar Gach, and Solţānābād) is a village in Abezhdan Rural District, Abezhdan District, Andika County, Khuzestan Province, Iran. At the 2006 census, its population was 1,239, in 216 families.
