= Darreh Dazdan, Kohgiluyeh and Boyer-Ahmad =

Darreh Dazdan دره دزدان
- Village
- Country: Iran
- Province: Kohgiluyeh and Boyer-Ahmad
- County: Boyer-Ahmad
- Bakhsh: Ludab
- Rural District: Ludab

Population (2006)
  - Total: 52
- Time zone: UTC+3:30 (IRST)
  - Summer (DST): UTC+4:30 (IRDT)

Darreh Dazdan (Persian: دره دزدان, also Romanized as Darreh Dazdān) is a village in Ludab Rural District, Ludab District, Boyer-Ahmad County, Kohgiluyeh and Boyer-Ahmad Province, Iran. At the 2006 census, its population was 52, in 11 families.
