= Ab Qaleh, Razavi Khorasan =

Village in Razavi Khorasan, Iran

Ab Qaleh ابقلعه
- Village
- Location within Iran
- Coordinates: 35°53′24″N 59°49′25″E
- Country: Iran
- Province: Razavi Khorasan
- County: Fariman
- Bakhsh: Central
- Rural District: Fariman

Population (2006)
  - Total: 80
- Time zone: UTC+3:30 (IRST)
  - Summer (DST): UTC+4:30 (IRDT)

Ab Qaleh (Persian: ابقلعه, also Romanized as Āb Qal‘eh) is a village in Fariman Rural District, in the Central District of Fariman County, Razavi Khorasan province, Iran. At the 2006 census, its population was 80, in 26 families.

== See also ==
- List of cities, towns and villages in Razavi Khorasan province
