= Kul Sorkh, Chaharmahal and Bakhtiari =

Kul Sorkh كول سرخ
- Village
- Location within Iran
- Coordinates: 32°11′41″N 50°06′08″E
- Country: Iran
- Province: Chaharmahal and Bakhtiari
- County: Kuhrang
- Bakhsh: Bazoft
- Rural District: Bazoft

Population (2006)
  - Total: 98
- Time zone: UTC+3:30 (IRST)
  - Summer (DST): UTC+4:30 (IRDT)

Kul Sorkh (Persian: كول سرخ, also Romanized as Kūl Sorkh and Kūl-e Sorkh; also known as Kolāh Sorkh) is a village in Bazoft Rural District, Bazoft District, Kuhrang County, Chaharmahal and Bakhtiari Province, Iran. At the 2006 census, its population was 98, in 19 families. The village is populated by Lurs.
