= Darreh Duzdan, Lorestan =

Darreh Duzdan دره دزدان
- Village
- Location within Iran
- Coordinates: 33°33′44″N 48°27′51″E
- Country: Iran
- Province: Lorestan
- County: Khorramabad
- Bakhsh: Central
- Rural District: Dehpir-e Shomali

Population (2006)
  - Total: 225
- Time zone: UTC+3:30 (IRST)
  - Summer (DST): UTC+4:30 (IRDT)

Darreh Duzdan (Persian: دره دزدان, also Romanized as Darreh Dūzdān; also known as Darreh Dūzān) is a village in Dehpir-e Shomali Rural District, in the Central District of Khorramabad County, Lorestan Province, Iran. At the 2006 census, its population was 225, in 52 families.
