= Pay Takht-e Varzard =

Pay Takht-e Varzard پايتخت ورزرد
- Village
- Location within Iran
- Coordinates: 31°55′56″N 49°41′19″E
- Country: Iran
- Province: Khuzestan
- County: Izeh
- Bakhsh: Central
- Rural District: Margha

Population (2006)
  - Total: 164
- Time zone: UTC+3:30 (IRST)
  - Summer (DST): UTC+4:30 (IRDT)

Pay Takht-e Varzard (Persian: پايتخت ورزرد, also Romanized as Pāy Takht-e Varzard; also known as Varzard Pāytakht) is a village in Margha Rural District, in the Central District of Izeh County, Khuzestan Province, Iran. At the 2006 census, its population was 164, in 31 families.
