= Ab Rizak, Bagh-e Malek =

Ab Rizak ابريزك
- Village
- Location within Iran
- Coordinates: 31°25′57″N 50°00′49″E
- Country: Iran
- Province: Khuzestan
- County: Bagh-e Malek
- Bakhsh: Central
- Rural District: Haparu

Population (2006)
  - Total: 119
- Time zone: UTC+3:30 (IRST)
  - Summer (DST): UTC+4:30 (IRDT)

Ab Rizak (Persian: ابريزك, also Romanized as Āb Rīzak; also known as Āb Razak) is a village in Haparu Rural District, in the Central District of Bagh-e Malek County, Khuzestan province, Iran. At the 2006 census, its population was 119, in 22 families.
