= Ab Rizak, Lorestan =

Ab Rizak ابريزك
- Village
- Location within Iran
- Coordinates: 33°07′26″N 48°49′51″E
- Country: Iran
- Province: Lorestan
- County: Khorramabad
- Bakhsh: Papi
- Rural District: Chamsangar

Population (2006)
  - Total: 67
- Time zone: UTC+3:30 (IRST)
  - Summer (DST): UTC+4:30 (IRDT)

Ab Rizak (Persian: ابريزك, also Romanized as Āb Rīzaḵ; also known as Abrizak) is a village in Chamsangar Rural District, Papi District, Khorramabad County, Lorestan province, Iran. At the 2006 census, its population was 67, in 13 families.
