= Do Balutan, Izeh =

Do Balutan دوبلوطان
- Village
- Location within Iran
- Coordinates: 32°06′41″N 49°42′57″E
- Country: Iran
- Province: Khuzestan
- County: Izeh
- Bakhsh: Susan
- Rural District: Susan-e Gharbi

Population (2006)
  - Total: 65
- Time zone: UTC+3:30 (IRST)
  - Summer (DST): UTC+4:30 (IRDT)

Do Balutan (Persian: دوبلوطان, also Romanized as Do Balūţān; also known as Dobalootan Andika, Do Balūţān-e Soleymānvand, and Do Balūţān-e Soleymān Vand-e Soflá) is a village in Susan-e Gharbi Rural District, Susan District, Izeh County, Khuzestan Province, Iran. At the 2006 census, its population was 65, in 9 families.
