= Qaleh-ye Khvajeh =

City in Khuzestan province, Iran

Qaleh-ye Khvajeh Persian: قلعه خواجه
- City
- Location within Iran
- Coordinates: 32°12′17″N 49°27′01″E
- Country: Iran
- Province: Khuzestan
- County: Andika
- District: Central

Population (2016)
  - Total: 2,408
- Time zone: UTC+3:30 (IRST)

Qaleh-ye Khvajeh (Persian: قلعه خواجه) (Note: Also romanized as Qal’eh Khājeh, Qal‘eh Khvājeh, and Qal‘eh-ye Khvājeh; also known as Qal‘eh-ye Khvājeh Bālā) is a city in the Central District of Andika County, Khuzestan province, Iran, serving as capital of both the county and the district. It is also the administrative center for Qaleh-ye Khvajeh Rural District.

== Demographics ==
=== Population ===
At the time of the 2006 National Census, the city's population was 801 in 179 households, when it was capital of the former Andika District of Masjed Soleyman County. The following census in 2011 counted 2,272 people in 503 households, by which time the district had been separated from the county in the establishment of Andika County. Qaleh-ye Khvajeh was transferred to the new Central District as the county's capital. The 2016 census measured the population of the city as 2,408 people in 606 households.
