= Abezhdan, Ramhormoz =

Abezhdan ابژدان
- Village
- Location within Iran
- Coordinates: 31°07′12″N 49°55′25″E
- Country: Iran
- Province: Khuzestan
- County: Ramhormoz
- Bakhsh: Central
- Rural District: Abolfares

Population (2006)
  - Total: 191
- Time zone: UTC+3:30 (IRST)
  - Summer (DST): UTC+4:30 (IRDT)

Abezhdan (Persian: ابژدان, also romanized as Ābezhdān; also known as Ābeshdūn-e ‘Olyā) is a village in Abolfares Rural District, in the Central District of Ramhormoz County, Khuzestan Province, Iran. At the 2006 census, its population was 191, in 39 families.
