= Abezhdan-e Sofla =

Abezhdan-e Sofla ابژدان سفلي
- Village
- Location within Iran
- Coordinates: 31°07′04″N 49°55′42″E
- Country: Iran
- Province: Khuzestan
- County: Ramhormoz
- Bakhsh: Central
- Rural District: Abolfares

Population (2006)
  - Total: 180
- Time zone: UTC+3:30 (IRST)
  - Summer (DST): UTC+4:30 (IRDT)

Abezhdan-e Sofla (Persian: ابژدان سفلي, also Romanized as Ābezhdān-e Soflá; also known as Ābeshdūn and Ābeshdūn-e Soflá) is a village in Abolfares Rural District, in the Central District of Ramhormoz County, Khuzestan Province, Iran. At the 2006 census, its population was 180, in 33 families.
