= Andika District =

Former district in Khuzestan province, Iran

Andika District Persian: بخش اندیکا
- Former District
- Location within Iran
- Coordinates: 32°20′N 49°35′E
- Country: Iran
- Province: Khuzestan
- County: Masjed Soleyman
- Capital: Qaleh-ye Khvajeh

Population (2006)
  - Total: 49,430
- Time zone: UTC+3:30 (IRST)

Andika District (Persian: بخش اندیکا) is a former administrative division of Masjed Soleyman County, Khuzestan province, Iran. Its capital was the city of Qaleh-ye Khvajeh.

== History ==
After the 2006 National Census, the district was separated from the county in the establishment of Andika County.

== Demographics ==
=== Population ===
At the time of the 2006 census, the district's population was 49,430 in 8,708 households.

=== Administrative divisions ===
Andika District Population
Administrative Divisions	2006
Abezhdan RD	13,493
Chelu RD	5,118
Kushk RD	8,479
Lalar and Katak RD	3,991
Qaleh-ye Khvajeh RD	13,094
Shalal and Dasht-e Gol RD	4,454
Qaleh-ye Khvajeh (city)	801
Total	49,430
RD = Rural District
