= Lalar and Katak Rural District =

Rural district in Khuzestan province, Iran

Lalar and Katak Rural District Persian: دهستان للر و کتک
- Rural District
- Location within Iran
- Coordinates: 32°27′55″N 49°35′39″E
- Country: Iran
- Province: Khuzestan
- County: Andika
- District: Chelu
- Capital: Katak

Population (2016)
  - Total: 5,418
- Time zone: UTC+3:30 (IRST)

Lalar and Katak Rural District (Persian: دهستان للر و کتک) is in Chelu District of Andika County, Khuzestan province, Iran. Its capital is the village of Katak.

== Demographics ==
=== Population ===
At the time of the 2006 National Census, the rural district's population (as a part of the former Andika District of Masjed Soleyman County) was 3,991 in 670 households. There were 5,260 inhabitants in 962 households at the following census of 2011, by which time the district had been separated from the county in the establishment of Andika County. The rural district was transferred to the new Chelu District. The 2016 census measured the population of the rural district as 5,418 in 1,255 households. The most populous of its 53 villages was Lalar, with 636 people.
