= Kushk Rural District (Andika County) =

Rural district in Khuzestan province, Iran

Kushk Rural District Persian: دهستان كوشك
- Rural District
- Location within Iran
- Coordinates: 32°09′N 49°35′E
- Country: Iran
- Province: Khuzestan
- County: Andika
- District: Abezhdan
- Capital: Kushk

Population (2016)
  - Total: 7,337
- Time zone: UTC+3:30 (IRST)

Kushk Rural District (Persian: دهستان كوشك) is in Abezhdan District of Andika County, Khuzestan province, Iran. Its capital is the village of Kushk.

== Demographics ==
=== Population ===
At the time of the 2006 National Census, the rural district's population (as a part of the former Andika District of Masjed Soleyman County) was 8,479 in 1,554 households. There were 8,402 inhabitants in 1,789 households at the following census of 2011, by which time the district had been separated from the county in the establishment of Andika County. The rural district was transferred to the new Abezhdan District. The 2016 census measured the population of the rural district as 7,337 in 1,868 households. The most populous of its 111 villages was Kushkak-e Kushk, with 2,240 people.
