= Shalal and Dasht-e Gol Rural District =

Rural district in Khuzestan province, Iran

Shalal and Dasht-e Gol Rural District Persian: دهستان شلال و دشت گل
- Rural District
- Location within Iran
- Coordinates: 32°24′43″N 49°28′43″E
- Country: Iran
- Province: Khuzestan
- County: Andika
- District: Central
- Capital: Pa Ab-e Shelal

Population (2016)
  - Total: 3,669
- Time zone: UTC+3:30 (IRST)

Shalal and Dasht-e Gol Rural District (Persian: دهستان شلال و دشت گل) is in the Central District of Andika County, Khuzestan province, Iran. Its capital is the village of Pa Ab-e Shelal.

== Demographics ==
=== Population ===
At the time of the 2006 National Census, the rural district's population (as a part of the former Andika District of Masjed Soleyman County) was 4,454 in 780 households. There were 3,856 inhabitants in 753 households at the following census of 2011, by which time the district had been separated from the county in the establishment of Andika County. The rural district was transferred to the new Central District. The 2016 census measured the population of the rural district as 3,669 in 886 households. The most populous of its 84 villages was Parivachzab Andikayi, with 315 people.
