= Chelu Rural District =

Rural district in Khuzestan province, Iran

Chelu Rural District Persian: دهستان چلو
- Rural District
- Location within Iran
- Coordinates: 32°22′13″N 49°45′06″E
- Country: Iran
- Province: Khuzestan
- County: Andika
- District: Chelu
- Capital: Zavut

Population (2016)
  - Total: 5,527
- Time zone: UTC+3:30 (IRST)

Chelu Rural District (Persian: دهستان چلو) is in Chelu District of Andika County, Khuzestan province, Iran. It is administered from the city of Zavut.

== Demographics ==
=== Population ===
At the time of the 2006 National Census, the rural district's population (as a part of the former Andika District of Masjed Soleyman County) was 5,118 in 833 households. There were 5,365 inhabitants in 1,056 households at the following census of 2011, by which time the district had been separated from the county in the establishment of Andika County. The rural district was transferred to the new Chelu District. The 2016 census measured the population of the rural district as 2016, the population of the rural district was 5,527 in 1,165 households. The most populous of its 82 villages was Zavut (now a city), with 1,031 people.
