= Abezhdan Rural District =

Rural district in Khuzestan province, Iran

Abezhdan Rural District Persian: دهستان ابژدان
- Rural District
- Location within Iran
- Coordinates: 32°05′58″N 49°27′29″E
- Country: Iran
- Province: Khuzestan
- County: Andika
- District: Abezhdan
- Capital: Abezhdan

Population (2016)
  - Total: 10,478
- Time zone: UTC+3:30 (IRST)

Abezhdan Rural District (Persian: دهستان ابژدان) is in Abezhdan District of Andika County, Khuzestan province, Iran. It is administered from the city of Abezhdan. (Note: Formerly the village of Jafarabad)

== Demographics ==
=== Population ===
At the time of the 2006 National Census, the rural district's population (as a part of the former Andika District of Masjed Soleyman County) was 13,493 in 2,474 households. There were 13,894 inhabitants in 2,944 households at the following census of 2011, by which time the district had been separated from the county in the establishment of Andika County. The rural district was transferred to the new Abezhdan District. The 2016 census measured the population of the rural district as 10,478 in 2,600 households. The most populous of its 88 villages was Shahrak-e Mohammad Reza Asadpur, with 1,043 people.
