= Qaleh-ye Khvajeh Rural District =

Rural district in Khuzestan province, Iran

Qaleh-ye Khvajeh Rural District Persian: دهستان قلعه خواجه
- Rural District
- Location within Iran
- Coordinates: 32°16′29″N 49°24′20″E
- Country: Iran
- Province: Khuzestan
- County: Andika
- District: Central
- Capital: Qaleh-ye Khvajeh

Population (2016)
  - Total: 11,119
- Time zone: UTC+3:30 (IRST)

Qaleh-ye Khvajeh Rural District (Persian: دهستان قلعه خواجه) is in the Central District of Andika County, Khuzestan province, Iran. It is administered from the city of Qaleh-ye Khvajeh.

== Demographics ==
=== Population ===
At the time of the 2006 National Census, the rural district's population (as a part of the former Andika District of Masjed Soleyman County) was 13,094 in 2,218 households. There were 11,654 inhabitants in 2,418 households at the following census of 2011, by which time the district had been separated from the county in the establishment of Andika County. The rural district was transferred to the new Central District. The 2016 census measured the population of the rural district as 11,119 in 2,778 households. The most populous of its 133 villages was Taherabad, with 652 people.
