= Chelu District =

District in Khuzestan province, Iran

Chelu District Persian: بخش چلو
- District
- Location within Iran
- Coordinates: 32°26′27″N 49°40′14″E
- Country: Iran
- Province: Khuzestan
- County: Andika
- Capital: Zabut

Population (2016)
  - Total: 10,945
- Time zone: UTC+3:30 (IRST)

Chelu District (Persian: بخش چلو) is in Andika County, Khuzestan province, Iran. Its capital is the village of Zabut.

== History ==
After the National Census in 2006, Andika District was separated from Masjed Soleyman County in the establishment of Andika County, which was divided into three districts of two districts each, with Qaleh-ye Khvajeh as its capital and only city at the time. After the 2016 census, the village of Zavut was elevated to the status of a city.

== Demographics ==
=== Population ===
At the time of the 2011 census, the district's population was 10,625 people in 2,018 households. The 2016 census measured the population of the district as 10,945 inhabitants in 2,420 households.

=== Administrative divisions ===
Chelu District Population
| Administrative Divisions | 2011 | 2016 |
|---|---|---|
| Chelu RD | 5,365 | 5,527 |
| Lalar and Katak RD | 5,260 | 5,418 |
| Zavut (city) (Note: Became a city after the 2016 census) | | |
| Total | 10,625 | 10,945 |
RD = Rural District
