= Abezhdan District =

District in Khuzestan province, Iran

Abezhdan District Persian: بخش ابژدان
- District
- Location within Iran
- Coordinates: 32°05′06″N 49°32′39″E
- Country: Iran
- Province: Khuzestan
- County: Andika
- Capital: Abezhdan

Population (2016)
  - Total: 19,488
- Time zone: UTC+3:30 (IRST)

Abezhdan District (Persian: بخش ابژدان) is in Andika County, Khuzestan province, Iran. Its capital is the city of Abezhdan. (Note: Formerly the village of Jafarabad)

== History ==
After the 2006 National Census, Andika District was separated from Masjed Soleyman County in the establishment of Andika County, which was divided into three districts of two districts each, with Qaleh-ye Khvajeh as its capital and only city at the time. After the 2011 census, the village of Jafarabad, after merging with several other villages, was elevated to city status as Abezhdan.

== Demographics ==
=== Population ===
At the time of the 2011 census, the district's population was 22,296 people in 4,733 households. The 2016 census measured the population of the district as 19,488 inhabitants in 4,888 households.

=== Administrative divisions ===
Abezhdan District Population
Administrative Divisions	2011	2016
Abezhdan RD	13,894	10,478
Kushk RD	8,402	7,337
Abezhdan (city)		1,673
Total	22,296	19,488
RD = Rural District
