= Central District (Andika County) =

District in Khuzestan province, Iran

Central District (Andika County) Persian: بخش مرکزی شهرستان اندیکا
- District
- Location within Iran
- Coordinates: 32°22′59″N 49°27′58″E
- Country: Iran
- Province: Khuzestan
- County: Andika
- Capital: Qaleh-ye Khvajeh

Population (2016)
  - Total: 17,196
- Time zone: UTC+3:30 (IRST)

The Central District of Andika County (Persian: بخش مرکزی شهرستان اندیکا) is in Khuzestan province, Iran. Its capital is the city of Qaleh-ye Khvajeh.

== History ==
After the 2006 National Census, Andika District was separated from Masjed Soleyman County in the establishment of Andika County, which was divided into three districts of two districts each, with Qaleh-ye Khvajeh as its capital and only city at the time.

== Demographics ==
=== Population ===
At the time of the 2011 census, the district's population was 17,782 people in 3,674 households. The 2016 census measured the population of the district as 17,196 inhabitants in 4,270 households.

=== Administrative divisions ===
Central District (Andika County) Population
Administrative Divisions	2011	2016
Qaleh-ye Khvajeh RD	11,654	11,119
Shalal and Dasht-e Gol RD	3,856	3,669
Qaleh-ye Khvajeh (city)	2,272	2,408
Total	17,782	17,196
RD = Rural District
