= Andika County =

County in Khuzestan province, Iran

Andika County Persian: شهرستان اندیکا
- County
- Location of Andika County in Khuzestan province (top right, purple)

- Location of Khuzestan province in Iran
- Coordinates: 32°20′N 49°35′E
- Country: Iran
- Province: Khuzestan
- Capital: Qaleh-ye Khvajeh
- Districts: Central, Abezhdan, Chelu

Population (2016)
  - Total: 47,629
- Time zone: UTC+3:30 (IRST)

Andika County (Persian: شهرستان اندیکا) is in Khuzestan province, Iran. Its capital is the city of Qaleh-ye Khvajeh.

== History ==
After the 2006 National Census, Andika District was separated from Masjed Soleyman County in the establishment of Andika County, which was divided into three districts of two districts each, with Qaleh-ye Khvajeh as its capital and only city at the time. After the 2011 census, the village of Jafarabad, after merging with several other villages, was elevated to city status as Abezhdan. After the 2016 census, the village of Zavut was elevated to the status of a city.

In 2020, it was reported that the least weasel, the world's smallest carnivore, was seen in Andika County.

== Demographics ==
=== Population ===
At the time of the 2011 census, the county's population was 50,797 people in 10,440 households. The 2016 census measured the population of the county as 47,629 in 11,578 households.

=== Administrative divisions ===
Andika County's population history and administrative structure over two consecutive censuses are shown in the following table.

Andika County Population
Administrative Divisions	2011	2016
Central District	17,782	17,196
Qaleh-ye Khvajeh RD	11,654	11,119
Shalal and Dasht-e Gol RD	3,856	3,669
Qaleh-ye Khvajeh (city)	2,272	2,408
Abezhdan District	22,296	19,488
Abezhdan RD	13,894	10,478
Kushk RD	8,402	7,337
Abezhdan (city) (Note: Formerly the village of Jafarabad)		1,673
Chelu District	10,625	10,945
Lalar and Katak RD	5,260	5,418
Chelu RD	5,365	5,527
Zavut (city) (Note: Became a city after the 2016 census)		
Total	50,797	47,629
RD = Rural District

== See also ==
Media related to Andika County at Wikimedia Commons
