= Boneh =

Boneh or Beneh most often refers to:

- Dan Boneh (b. 1969), Israeli computer scientist
  - Boneh–Franklin scheme, an identity-based encryption system
  - Boneh-Lynn-Shacham, a signature authentication system
- Solel Boneh, Israeli construction and civil engineering company

Boneh or Beneh may also refer to:

== Iran ==
(Persian: بنه)

- Beneh, Ardabil, a village in Iran
- Boneh, Khuzestan, a village in Iran
- Boneh, Markazi, a village in Iran
- Boneh Alvan, a village in Iran
- Boneh Anbar, a village in Iran
- Boneh Balut, Kohgiluyeh and Boyer-Ahmad, a village in Iran
- Boneh Dan, a village in Iran
- Boneh Darvazeh, a village in Iran
- Boneh Dasht, a village in Iran
- Boneh Dastak, a village in Iran
- Boneh Deraz, a village in Iran
- Boneh Goli, a village in Iran
- Boneh Guni, a village in Iran
- Boneh Ju, a village in Iran
- Boneh Kaghi, a village in Iran
- Boneh Karuk, a village in Iran
- Boneh Kenar, a village in Iran
- Boneh Kuh, a village in Iran
- Boneh Kuh, Semnan, a village in Iran
- Boneh Lam, a village in Iran
- Boneh Lasheh, a village in Iran
- Boneh Pir, a village in Iran
- Boneh Posht, a village in Iran
- Boneh Razi, a village in Iran
- Boneh Seyyed Taher, a village in Iran
- Boneh Shanbeh, a village in Iran
- Boneh Sur, a village in Iran
- Boneh Var-e Yaqub, a village in Iran
- Boneh Zard, a village in Iran
- Boneh-e Askari, a village in Iran
- Boneh-ye Abbas (disambiguation), villages in Iran
- Boneh-ye Abd, a village in Iran
- Boneh-ye Abed, a village in Iran
- Boneh-ye Abedun, a village in Iran
- Boneh-ye Ahmad, a village in Iran
- Boneh-ye Ahmadi, a village in Iran
- Boneh-ye Ajam, a village in Iran
- Boneh-ye Akhund (disambiguation), villages in Iran
- Boneh-ye Ali, a village in Iran
- Boneh-ye Ali-Mardan Khan, a village in Iran
- Boneh-ye Amir Asgar, a village in Iran
- Boneh-ye Aqa-ye Bozorg, a village in Iran
- Boneh-ye Arun, a village in Iran
- Boneh-ye Asad Davud, a village in Iran
- Boneh-ye Atabak, a village in Iran
- Boneh-ye Ati, a village in Iran
- Boneh-ye Azim, a village in Iran
- Boneh-ye Ba Damuiyeh, a village in Iran
- Boneh-ye Baba Zahed, a village in Iran
- Boneh-ye Bad, a village in Iran
- Boneh-ye Bandar, a village in Iran
- Boneh-ye Cheragh (disambiguation), villages in Iran
- Boneh-ye Chahar, a village in Iran
- Boneh-ye Dari, a village in Iran
- Bon-e Esfandi, a village in Iran
- Boneh-ye Esmail (disambiguation), villages in Iran
- Boneh-ye Fakhr (disambiguation), villages in Iran
- Boneh-ye Fathali, a village in Iran
- Boneh-ye Gach, a village in Iran
- Bon-e Gelu, a village in Iran
- Boneh-ye Ghalim, a village in Iran
- Boneh-ye Gholamali, a village in Iran
- Boneh-ye Gholamreza, a village in Iran
- Boneh-ye Hajat, a village in Iran
- Boneh-ye Hajj Nemat, a village in Iran
- Boneh-ye Hajji, a village in Iran
- Boneh-ye Hajji, Fars, a village in Iran
- Boneh-ye Hajji Ali, a village in Iran
- Boneh-ye Haqqi, a village in Iran
- Boneh-ye Heydar, a village in Iran
- Boneh-ye Hoseyn Kaluli, a village in Iran
- Boneh-ye Isa, a village in Iran
- Boneh-ye Jaberi, a village in Iran
- Boneh-ye Jan Mohammad, a village in Iran
- Boneh-ye Kamtuleh, a village in Iran
- Boneh-ye Karim, a village in Iran
- Boneh-ye Kazem, a village in Iran
- Boneh-ye Kazem Hajj Soltan, a village in Iran
- Boneh-ye Kazem Jamal, a village in Iran
- Boneh-ye Khanjar, a village in Iran
- Boneh-ye Khater, a village in Iran
- Boneh-ye Khiraleh, a village in Iran
- Boneh-ye Khumehzar, a former village in Iran
- Boneh-ye Kordi, a village in Iran
- Boneh-ye Kuyeh, a village in Iran
- Boneh-ye Lar, a village in Iran
- Boneh-ye Majid, a village in Iran
- Boneh-ye Mirza, a village in Iran
- Boneh-ye Mirza Ali Akbar, a village in Iran
- Boneh-ye Mohammad, a village in Iran
- Boneh-ye Mohammad Ali, a village in Iran
- Boneh-ye Molla Ahmad, a village in Iran
- Boneh-ye Molla Mehdi, a village in Iran
- Boneh-ye Mordeh Ghaffar, a village in Iran
- Boneh-ye Morteza, a village in Iran
- Boneh-ye Musa, a village in Iran
- Boneh-ye Nafal, a village in Iran
- Boneh-ye Naimeh, a village in Iran
- Boneh-ye Narges, a village in Iran
- Boneh-ye Nejat, a village in Iran
- Boneh-ye Owlad, a village in Iran
- Boneh-ye Qaem, a village in Iran
- Boneh-ye Qeysar, a village in Iran
- Boneh-ye Qeytas, a village in Iran
- Boneh-ye Qobad, a village in Iran
- Boneh-ye Rahimali, a village in Iran
- Boneh-ye Rahmani, a village in Iran
- Boneh-ye Rashid, a village in Iran
- Boneh-ye Rezvan, a village in Iran
- Boneh-ye Sahrab, a village in Iran
- Boneh-ye Sarhadi, a village in Iran
- Boneh-ye Seyyed Mohammad Reza, a village in Iran
- Boneh-ye Seyyed Nasrollah, a village in Iran
- Boneh-ye Shah Reza Arab, a village in Iran
- Boneh-ye Shir Mohammad, a village in Iran
- Boneh-ye Sib, a village in Iran
- Boneh-ye Sukhteh (disambiguation), villages in Iran
- Boneh-ye Sukhteh Char, a village in Iran
- Boneh-ye Taher, a village in Iran
- Boneh-ye Teymur, a village in Iran
- Boneh-ye Yabareh, a village in Iran
- Boneh-ye Zobeydeh, a village in Iran
- Boneh-ye Zolfaqar, a village in Iran

== See also ==
- Boneh Var (disambiguation)
- Do Boneh (disambiguation)
