= Bon, Iran =

Bon (Persian: بن) may refer to:

== Bushehr Province ==
- Bon Bid, a village in Dashti County

== Hormozgan Province ==
- Bon Gahar, a village in Hajjiabad County
- Bon-e Garekh, a village in Bashagard County
- Bon Kuh, a village in Bandar Lengeh County

== Ilam Province ==
- Bon Baba Jan, a village in Darreh Shahr County
- Bon Vaz, a village in Ilam County

== Isfahan Province ==
- Bon Rud District, an administrative subdivision of Isfahan County

== Kerman Province ==
- Bon-e Derriz, a village in Anbarabad County
- Bon-e Gelu, a village in Anbarabad County
- Bon-e Navizan, a village in Anbarabad County

== Khuzestan Province ==
- Bon Ajam, a village in Haftgel County
- Bon-e Dab, a village in Lali County
- Bon Honi, a village in Andimeshk County
- Bon Konar, a village in Izeh County
- Bon Rashid, a village in Ramhormoz County
- Bon Shovar, a village in Bagh-e Malek County

== Lorestan Province ==
- Bon Abbas, a village in Pol-e Dokhtar County
- Bon Abbas Gol Bag Mir, a village in Pol-e Dokhtar County
- Bon Karreh-ye Kohzadvand, a village in Pol-e Dokhtar County
- Bon Keshkeh, a village in Pol-e Dokhtar County
- Bon Lar, a village in Pol-e Dokhtar County
- Bon Mazraeh, a village in Dowreh County
- Bon Pahneh, a village in Pol-e Dokhtar County
- Bon Tang, a village in Aligudarz County
- Bon Tuman 1, a village in Pol-e Dokhtar County
- Bon Tuman 2, a village in Pol-e Dokhtar County
- Bon Tuman 3, a village in Pol-e Dokhtar County
- Bon Vizeh, a village in Borujerd County

== Markazi Province ==
- Bon Chenar, a village in Ashtian County
- Bon-e Gonbad, a village in Shazand County

== Qazvin Province ==
- Bon Zohreh, a village in Qazvin County

== Razavi Khorasan ==
- Bon Jakh, a village in Sabzevar County

== Semnan Province ==
- Bon-e Kuh, Semnan, a village in Garmsar County

== South Khorasan Province ==
- Bon Khunik, a village in Qaen County
