= Rikhan =

Rikhan or Reykhan (Persian: ريخان) may refer to:

- Rikhan, Lorestan, a village in Lorestan Province, Iran
- Reykhan, South Khorasan, a village in South Khorasan Province, Iran
- Rikhan 1, or Rikhan-e Yek, a village in Lorestan Province in Iran
- Rikhan 2, or Rikhan-e Do, a village in Lorestan Province, Iran
- Rikhan 3, Rikhan-e Seh, a village in Lorestan Province, Iran
- Rikhan, Zanjan, a village in Zanjan Province, Iran

== See also ==
- Rihan (disambiguation)
