= Choghamish =

Choghamish or Chogha Mish (Persian: چغاميش) may refer to:

- Chogha Mish, an archaeological site in Iran
- Choghamish, Iran, a village in Iran
- Choghamish District, an administrative subdivision of Iran
- Choghamish Rural District, an administrative subdivision of Iran
