= Qaleh-ye Khalil =

Village in Khuzestan, Iran

Qaleh-ye Khalil قلعه خليل
- Village
- Location within Iran
- Coordinates: 32°13′36″N 48°31′46″E
- Country: Iran
- Province: Khuzestan
- County: Dezful
- Bakhsh: Choghamish
- Rural District: Choghamish

Population (2006)
  - Total: 249
- Time zone: UTC+3:30 (IRST)
  - Summer (DST): UTC+4:30 (IRDT)

Qaleh-ye Khalil (Persian: قلعه خليل, also Romanized as Qal‘eh-ye Khalīl; also known as Ghal‘eh Khalil, Qal‘eh Nau, Qal‘eh Now, Qal‘eh Now ‘Askar, Qal‘eh Now-e Khalīl, and Qal‘eh-ye Khalīlī) is a village in Choghamish Rural District, Choghamish District, Dezful County, Khuzestan Province, Iran. At the 2006 census, its population was 249, in 49 families.
