= Seyfabad, Dezful =

Seyfabad سيف اباد
- Village
- Location within Iran
- Coordinates: 32°12′02″N 48°29′43″E
- Country: Iran
- Province: Khuzestan
- County: Dezful
- Bakhsh: Choghamish
- Rural District: Choghamish

Population (2006)
  - Total: 456
- Time zone: UTC+3:30 (IRST)
  - Summer (DST): UTC+4:30 (IRDT)

Seyfabad (Persian: سيف اباد, also Romanized as Seyfābād; also known as Shahrak-e Qods and Shahrak-e Qodūs) is a village in Choghamish Rural District, Choghamish District, Dezful County, Khuzestan Province, Iran. At the 2006 census, its population was 456, in 94 families.
