= Balvan =

Balvan may refer to:

- Balvan, Bulgaria, in Veliko Tarnovo Municipality
- Balvan, Kermanshah, a village in Iran
- Balvan Point, on Antarctica

== See also ==
- Balavan (disambiguation)
