= Seyyed Nur =

Seyyed Nur سيدنور
- Village
- Location within Iran
- Coordinates: 32°08′12″N 48°29′46″E
- Country: Iran
- Province: Khuzestan
- County: Dezful
- Bakhsh: Choghamish
- Rural District: Kheybar

Population (2006)
  - Total: 1,342
- Time zone: UTC+3:30 (IRST)
  - Summer (DST): UTC+4:30 (IRDT)

Seyyed Nur (Persian: سيدنور, also Romanized as Seyyed Nūr) is a village in Kheybar Rural District, Choghamish District, Dezful County, Khuzestan Province, Iran. At the 2006 census, its population was 1,342, in 279 families.
