= Boneh-ye Sukhteh =

Boneh-ye Sukhteh or Boneh Sukhteh (Persian: بنه سوخته) may refer to:

- Boneh Sukhteh, Kerman
- Boneh Sukhteh, Bam, Kerman Province
- Boneh-ye Sukhteh, Khuzestan
