= Fozeyli =

Fozeyli or Fazili (Persian: فضيلي) may refer to:

- Fazili, Fars
- Fozeyli, Khuzestan

== See also ==
- Sheykh Fozeyli
