= Kamtuleh =

Kamtuleh or Kamtooleh (Persian: كمتوله) may refer to:

- Kamtuleh-ye Shahriari
- Kamtuleh-ye Yusefabad
