= Chegha Cheshmeh =

Chegha Cheshmeh چغاچشمه
- Village
- Location within Iran
- Coordinates: 32°08′00″N 48°29′00″E
- Country: Iran
- Province: Khuzestan
- County: Dezful
- Bakhsh: Choghamish
- Rural District: Kheybar

Population (2006)
  - Total: 264
- Time zone: UTC+3:30 (IRST)
  - Summer (DST): UTC+4:30 (IRDT)

Chegha Cheshmeh (Persian: چغاچشمه, also Romanized as Cheghā Cheshmeh, Chogha Chashmeh, and Chaghā Cheshmeh; also known as Chaqā Cheshmeh) is a village in Kheybar Rural District, Choghamish District, Dezful County, Khuzestan Province, Iran. At the 2006 census, its population was 264, in 48 families.
