= Bonut =

Bonut or Benut (Persian: بنوت) may refer to:

- Benut-e Bala
- Benut-e Pain
- Benut a mukim in Pontian District, Johor, Malaysia.
