= Khowzineh =

Khowzineh (Persian: خوزينه) may refer to:

- Khowzineh-ye Bala
- Khowzineh-ye Baqer
