= Qaleh-ye Sardar =

Qaleh-ye Sardar or Qaleh Sardar or Qaleh-e Sardar (Persian: قلعه سردار) may refer to:

- Qaleh Sardar, Fars
- Qaleh-ye Sardar, Khuzestan
- Qaleh Sardar, West Azerbaijan
