= Kugan =

Kugan (Persian: كوگان) may refer to:

- Kugan, Isfahan
- Kugan Baraftab, Lorestan Province
- Kugan Nasar, Lorestan Province
- Kugan Parapen, Mauritian politician
