= Posht Darb =

Posht Darb (Persian: پشتدرب) may refer to:

- Posht Darb-e Olya
- Posht Darb-e Sofla
- Posht Darb-e Vosta
