= Dastak, Iran (disambiguation) =

Dastak, Iran is a village in Gilan Province, Iran.

Dastak (Persian: دستك) in Iran may also refer to:

- Dastak-e Olya, Kermanshah Province
- Dastak-e Sofla, Kermanshah Province
