= Mobarezabad =

Mobarezabad مبارزاباد
- Village
- Location within Iran
- Coordinates: 32°11′00″N 48°32′00″E
- Country: Iran
- Province: Khuzestan
- County: Dezful
- Bakhsh: Choghamish
- Rural District: Choghamish

Population (2006)
  - Total: 61
- Time zone: UTC+3:30 (IRST)
  - Summer (DST): UTC+4:30 (IRDT)

Mobarezabad (Persian: مبارزاباد, also Romanized as Mobārezābād) is a village in Choghamish Rural District, Choghamish District, Dezful County, Khuzestan Province, Iran. At the 2006 census, its population was 61, in 10 families.
