= Shongor-e Olya =

Shongor-e Olya شنگرعليا
- Village
- Location within Iran
- Coordinates: 32°09′09″N 48°31′03″E
- Country: Iran
- Province: Khuzestan
- County: Dezful
- Bakhsh: Choghamish
- Rural District: Kheybar

Population (2006)
  - Total: 778
- Time zone: UTC+3:30 (IRST)
  - Summer (DST): UTC+4:30 (IRDT)

Shongor-e Olya (Persian: شنگرعليا, also Romanized as Shongor-e ‘Olyā; also known as Sangar-e ‘Olyā, Shagar-e Bālā, Shongor, Shongor Bālā, and Shongor-e Bālā) is a village in Kheybar Rural District, Choghamish District, Dezful County, Khuzestan Province, Iran. At the 2006 census, its population was 778, in 129 families.
