= Shahrak-e Seyyed Enayat =

Shahrak-e Seyyed Enayat شهرك سيدعنايت
- Village
- Location within Iran
- Coordinates: 32°11′11″N 48°30′12″E
- Country: Iran
- Province: Khuzestan
- County: Dezful
- Bakhsh: Choghamish
- Rural District: Choghamish

Population (2006)
  - Total: 626
- Time zone: UTC+3:30 (IRST)
  - Summer (DST): UTC+4:30 (IRDT)

Shahrak-e Seyyed Enayat (Persian: شهرك سيدعنايت, also Romanized as Shahrak-e Seyyed ‘Enāyat) is a village in Choghamish Rural District, Choghamish District, Dezful County, Khuzestan Province, Iran. At the 2006 census, its population was 626, in 122 families.
