= Beladiyeh =

Beladiyeh بلاديه
- Village
- Location within Iran
- Coordinates: 32°11′20″N 48°31′08″E
- Country: Iran
- Province: Khuzestan
- County: Dezful
- Bakhsh: Choghamish
- Rural District: Choghamish

Population (2006)
  - Total: 813
- Time zone: UTC+3:30 (IRST)
  - Summer (DST): UTC+4:30 (IRDT)

Beladiyeh (Persian: بلاديه, also Romanized as Belādīyeh; also known as Shahrak-e Belādīyeh) is a village in Choghamish Rural District, Choghamish District, Dezful County, Khuzestan Province, Iran. At the 2006 census, its population was 813, in 182 families.
