= Boneh-ye Cheragh =

Boneh-ye Cheragh (Persian: بنه چراغ) may refer to:

- Boneh-ye Cheragh, Howmeh-ye Gharbi
- Boneh-ye Cheragh, Soltanabad
