= Boneh-ye Isa =

Boneh-ye Isa بنه عيسي
- Village
- Location within Iran
- Coordinates: 32°10′06″N 48°31′51″E
- Country: Iran
- Province: Khuzestan
- County: Dezful
- Bakhsh: Choghamish
- Rural District: Choghamish

Population (2006)
  - Total: 373
- Time zone: UTC+3:30 (IRST)
  - Summer (DST): UTC+4:30 (IRDT)

Boneh-ye Isa (Persian: بنه عيسي, also Romanized as Boneh-ye ‘Īsá and Boneh Isa) is a village in Choghamish Rural District, Choghamish District, Dezful County, Khuzestan Province, Iran. At the 2006 census, its population was 373, in 76 families.
