= Qaleh-ye Sardar, Khuzestan =

Qaleh-ye Sardar قلعه سردار
- Village
- Location within Iran
- Coordinates: 32°16′44″N 48°31′40″E
- Country: Iran
- Province: Khuzestan
- County: Dezful
- Bakhsh: Choghamish
- Rural District: Choghamish

Population (2006)
  - Total: 283
- Time zone: UTC+3:30 (IRST)
  - Summer (DST): UTC+4:30 (IRDT)

Qaleh-ye Sardar (Persian: قلعه سردار, also Romanized as Qal‘eh-ye Sardār; also known as Ghal‘eh Sardar) is a village in Choghamish Rural District, Choghamish District, Dezful County, Khuzestan Province, Iran. At the 2006 census, its population was 283, in 55 families.
