= Shahrak-e Shahid Karimi =

Shahrak-e Shahid Karimi شهرك شهيدكريمي
- Village
- Location within Iran
- Coordinates: 32°16′39″N 48°30′03″E
- Country: Iran
- Province: Khuzestan
- County: Dezful
- Bakhsh: Choghamish
- Rural District: Choghamish

Population (2006)
  - Total: 1,423
- Time zone: UTC+3:30 (IRST)
  - Summer (DST): UTC+4:30 (IRDT)

Shahrak-e Shahid Karimi (Persian: شهرك شهيدكريمي, also Romanized as Shahrak-e Shahīd Karīmī; also known as Shahrak-e Shahīd Mehdī-ye Karīmī, Shalgahié ‘Olya, Shalgahī-ye Bālā, Shalgehī-ye Bālā, Shalgehī-ye ‘Olyā, Shalgahi (Persian: شلگهي), and Shalgī) is a village in Choghamish Rural District, Choghamish District, Dezful County, Khuzestan Province, Iran. At the 2006 census, its population was 1,423, in 316 families.

Village Mosque
