= Shalgi =

Shalgi may refer to:

- Ilan Shalgi (b. 1945), Israeli politician
- Shalgi Publishing House, Tel Aviv, Israeli publishing firm
- Shalgi, Iran, a village in Khuzestan Province, Iran
