= Boneh Var =

Boneh Var (Persian: بنه وار) may refer to:

- Boneh Var, Lali, Khuzestan Province
- Boneh Var, Hati, Khuzestan Province
- Boneh Var, Lorestan
