= Shahrak-e Kheybar =

Village in Khuzestan province, Iran

Shahrak-e Kheybar Persian: شهرك خيبر
- Village
- Location within Iran
- Coordinates: 32°09′07″N 48°31′46″E
- Country: Iran
- Province: Khuzestan
- County: Dezful
- District: Choghamish
- Rural District: Kheybar

Population (2016)
  - Total: 2,301
- Time zone: UTC+3:30 (IRST)

Shahrak-e Kheybar (Persian: شهرك خيبر) is a village in, and the capital of, Kheybar Rural District of Choghamish District, Dezful County, Khuzestan province, Iran.

== Demographics ==
=== Population ===
At the time of the 2006 National Census, the village's population was 2,124 in 421 households. The following census in 2011 counted 2,391 people in 575 households. The 2016 census measured the population of the village as 2,301 people in 629 households.
