= Benut-e Pain =

Benut-e Pain بنوت پايين
- Village
- Location within Iran
- Coordinates: 32°13′09″N 48°29′27″E
- Country: Iran
- Province: Khuzestan
- County: Dezful
- Bakhsh: Choghamish
- Rural District: Choghamish

Population (2006)
  - Total: 440
- Time zone: UTC+3:30 (IRST)
  - Summer (DST): UTC+4:30 (IRDT)

Benut-e Pain (Persian: بنوت پايين, also Romanized as Benūt-e Pā‘īn; also known as Bannut, Benūt, Bunūt, and Shahrak-e Benūt-e Soflá) is a village in Choghamish Rural District, Choghamish District, Dezful County, Khuzestan Province, Iran. At the 2006 census, its population was 440, in 89 families.
