= Boneh-ye Hajat =

Boneh-ye Hajat بنه حاجات
- Village
- Location within Iran
- Coordinates: 32°02′11″N 48°34′49″E
- Country: Iran
- Province: Khuzestan
- County: Dezful
- Bakhsh: Choghamish
- Rural District: Kheybar

Population (2006)
  - Total: 1,062
- Time zone: UTC+3:30 (IRST)
  - Summer (DST): UTC+4:30 (IRDT)

Boneh-ye Hajat (Persian: بنه حاجات, also Romanized as Boneh-ye Ḩājāt) is a village in Kheybar Rural District, Choghamish District, Dezful County, Khuzestan Province, Iran. At the 2006 census, its population was 1,062, in 194 families.
