= Benut-e Bala =

Benut-e Bala بنوت بالا
- Village
- Location within Iran
- Coordinates: 32°13′34″N 48°29′26″E
- Country: Iran
- Province: Khuzestan
- County: Dezful
- Bakhsh: Choghamish
- Rural District: Choghamish

Population (2006)
  - Total: 1,016
- Time zone: UTC+3:30 (IRST)
  - Summer (DST): UTC+4:30 (IRDT)

Benut-e Bala (Persian: بنوت بالا, also Romanized as Benūt-e Bālā and Bonūt-e Bālā; also known as Shahrak-e Benūt-e Mogharrī) is a village in Choghamish Rural District, Choghamish District, Dezful County, Khuzestan Province, Iran. At the 2006 census, its population was 1,016, in 209 families.
