= Shahrak-e Shahid Beheshti, Dezful =

Village in Khuzestan province, Iran

Shahrak-e Shahid Beheshti Persian: شهرك شهيدبهشتي
- Village
- Location within Iran
- Coordinates: 32°06′42″N 48°29′52″E
- Country: Iran
- Province: Khuzestan
- County: Dezful
- District: Choghamish
- Rural District: Kheybar

Population (2016)
  - Total: 3,351
- Time zone: UTC+3:30 (IRST)

Shahrak-e Shahid Beheshti (Persian: شهرك شهيدبهشتي) (Note: Also romanized as Shahrak-e Shahīd Beheshtī) is a village in Kheybar Rural District of Choghamish District, Dezful County, Khuzestan province, Iran.

== Demographics ==
=== Population ===
At the time of the 2006 National Census, the village's population was 2,728 in 495 households. The following census in 2011 counted 3,135 people in 710 households. The 2016 census measured the population of the village as 3,351 people in 870 households. It was the most populous village in its rural district.
