= Gabas =

Gabas may refer to:

- Gabas (river), a tributary of the Adour in south-west France
- Gabas, Pyrénées-Atlantiques, a hamlet in south-west France
- Pablo Antonio Gabas (born 1982), Argentine footballer

== See also ==
- Boneh-ye Abbas, Khuzestan, also known as Gabbas, a village in Iran
