= Boneh-ye Fakhr =

Boneh-ye Fakhr (Persian: بنه فاخر) may refer to:

- Boneh-ye Fakhr-e Bala
- Boneh-ye Fakhr-e Pain
