= Balavan =

Balavan or Balvan (Persian: بلوان) may refer to:

- Balvan, Kermanshah
- Balavan, Lorestan
