= Khowzineh-ye Baqer =

Khowzineh-ye Baqer خوزينه باقر
- Village
- Location within Iran
- Coordinates: 32°03′00″N 48°34′00″E
- Country: Iran
- Province: Khuzestan
- County: Dezful
- Bakhsh: Choghamish
- Rural District: Kheybar

Population (2006)
  - Total: 882
- Time zone: UTC+3:30 (IRST)
  - Summer (DST): UTC+4:30 (IRDT)

Khowzineh-ye Baqer (Persian: خوزينه باقر, also Romanized as Khowzīneh-ye Bāqer) is a village in Kheybar Rural District, Choghamish District, Dezful County, Khuzestan Province, Iran. At the 2006 census, its population was 882, in 139 families.
