= Boneh-ye Abbas =

Boneh-ye Abbas (Persian: بنه عباس) may refer to:

- Boneh-ye Abbas, Bushehr
- Boneh-ye Abbas, Khuzestan
