= Jandi Shapur =

City in Khuzestan province, Iran

Jandi Shapur Persian: جندی شاپور
- City
- Location within Iran
- Coordinates: 32°18′17″N 48°30′46″E
- Country: Iran
- Province: Khuzestan
- County: Dezful
- District: Choghamish

Population (2016)
  - Total: 5,298
- Time zone: UTC+3:30 (IRST)

Jandi Shapur (Persian: جندی شاپور) (Note: Formerly Eslamabad (اسلام اباد), also romanized as Eslāmābād) is a city in Choghamish District of Dezful County, Khuzestan province, Iran.

== Demographics ==
=== Population ===
At the time of the 2006 National Census, the population (as the village of Eslamabad) was 4,939 in 990 households, when it was in Choghamish Rural District. The following census in 2011 counted 5,410 people in 1,354 households. The 2016 census measured the population as 5,298 people in 1,468 households. It was the most populous village in its rural district.

After the census, the village of Eslamabad was elevated to city status as Jandi Shapur.
