= Gachi, Lorestan =

Village in Lorestan province, Iran

Gachi Persian: گچي
- Village
- Location within Iran
- Country: Iran
- Province: Lorestan
- County: Mamulan
- District: Afrineh
- Rural District: Miyankuh-e Sharqi

Population (2016)
  - Total: 32
- Time zone: UTC+3:30 (IRST)

Gachi (Persian: گچي) (Note: Also romanized as Gachī; also known as Garchī) is a village in Miyankuh-e Sharqi Rural District of Afrineh District in Mamulan County, Lorestan province, Iran.

== Demographics ==
=== Population ===
At the time of the 2006 National Census, the village's population was 51 in nine households, when it was in Mamulan District (Note: Renamed the Central District of Mamulan County) of Pol-e Dokhtar County. The following census in 2011 counted 41 people in eight households. The 2016 census measured the population of the village as 32 people in nine households.

In 2023, the district was separated from the county in the establishment of Mamulan County and renamed the Central District. The rural district was transferred to the new Afrineh District.
