= Posht Ju =

Village in Lorestan province, Iran

Posht Ju Persian: پشت جو
- Village
- Location within Iran
- Coordinates: 33°10′51″N 48°17′26″E
- Country: Iran
- Province: Lorestan
- County: Mamulan
- District: Afrineh
- Rural District: Miyankuh-e Sharqi

Population (2016)
  - Total: 65
- Time zone: UTC+3:30 (IRST)

Posht Ju (Persian: پشت جو) (Note: Also romanized as Posht Jow and Posht Jū; also known as Shahīd Raḩīmī-ye Yek and Shahīd Raḩīmī-ye Yek va Do) is a village in Miyankuh-e Sharqi Rural District of Afrineh District in Mamulan County, Lorestan province, Iran.

== Demographics ==
=== Population ===
At the time of the 2006 National Census, the village's population was 48 in 11 households, when it was in Mamulan District (Note: Renamed the Central District of Mamulan County) of Pol-e Dokhtar County. The following census in 2011 counted 94 people in 27 households. The 2016 census measured the population of the village as 65 people in 23 households.

In 2023, the district was separated from the county in the establishment of Mamulan County and renamed the Central District. The rural district was transferred to the new Afrineh District.
