= Khowzineh-ye Bala =

Khowzineh-ye Bala خوزينه بالا
- Village
- Location within Iran
- Coordinates: 32°02′24″N 48°34′12″E
- Country: Iran
- Province: Khuzestan
- County: Dezful
- Bakhsh: Choghamish
- Rural District: Kheybar

Population (2006)
  - Total: 415
- Time zone: UTC+3:30 (IRST)
  - Summer (DST): UTC+4:30 (IRDT)

Khowzineh-ye Bala (Persian: خوزينه بالا, also Romanized as Khowzīneh-ye Bālā and Khvozīneh-ye Bālā; also known as Boneh-ye ‘Ābed‘own, Boneh-ye ‘Ābed‘ūn, Khowzīnā Bālā, and Khowzīn-e Bālā) is a village in Kheybar Rural District, Choghamish District, Dezful County, Khuzestan Province, Iran. At the 2006 census, its population was 415, in 65 families.
