= Mian Tagan =

Village in Lorestan province, Iran

Mian Tagan Persian: ميان تاگان
- Village
- Location within Iran
- Coordinates: 33°10′49″N 48°15′55″E
- Country: Iran
- Province: Lorestan
- County: Mamulan
- District: Afrineh
- Rural District: Miyankuh-e Sharqi

Population (2016)
  - Total: 63
- Time zone: UTC+3:30 (IRST)

Mian Tagan (Persian: ميان تاگان) (Note: Also romanized as Mīan Tāgān and Mīan Tākān) is a village in Miyankuh-e Sharqi Rural District of Afrineh District in Mamulan County, Lorestan province, Iran.

== Demographics ==
=== Population ===
At the time of the 2006 National Census, the village's population was 127 in 23 households, when it was in Mamulan District (Note: Renamed the Central District of Mamulan County) of Pol-e Dokhtar County. The following census in 2011 counted 84 people in 23 households. The 2016 census measured the population of the village as 63 people in 20 households.

In 2023, the district was separated from the county in the establishment of Mamulan County and renamed the Central District. The rural district was transferred to the new Afrineh District.
