= Boneh-ye Akhund =

Boneh-ye Akhund (Persian: بنه اخوند) may refer to:

- Boneh-ye Akhund, Khuzestan
- Boneh-ye Akhund, Kohgiluyeh and Boyer-Ahmad
