= Khargalu =

Village in Lorestan province, Iran

Khargalu Persian: خرگلو
- Village
- Location within Iran
- Coordinates: 33°10′04″N 48°17′13″E
- Country: Iran
- Province: Lorestan
- County: Mamulan
- District: Afrineh
- Rural District: Miyankuh-e Sharqi

Population (2016)
  - Total: 54
- Time zone: UTC+3:30 (IRST)

Khargalu (Persian: خرگلو) (Note: Also romanized as Khargalū and Khergalū) is a village in Miyankuh-e Sharqi Rural District of Afrineh District in Mamulan County, Lorestan province, Iran.

== Demographics ==
=== Population ===
At the time of the 2006 National Census, the village's population was 40 in nine households, when it was in Mamulan District (Note: Renamed the Central District of Mamulan County) of Pol-e Dokhtar County. The following census in 2011 counted 33 people in 13 households. The 2016 census measured the population of the village as 54 people in 18 households.

In 2023, the district was separated from the county in the establishment of Mamulan County and renamed the Central District. The rural district was transferred to the new Afrineh District.
