= Posht Tang-e Chameshk =

Village in Lorestan province, Iran

Posht Tang-e Chameshk Persian: پشت تنگ چمشک
- Village
- Location within Iran
- Country: Iran
- Province: Lorestan
- County: Mamulan
- District: Afrineh
- Rural District: Miyankuh-e Sharqi

Population (2016)
  - Total: 0
- Time zone: UTC+3:30 (IRST)

Posht Tang-e Chameshk (Persian: پشت تنگ چمشک) (Note: Also known as Chameshk-e Posht-e Tang) is a village in Miyankuh-e Sharqi Rural District of Afrineh District in Mamulan County, Lorestan province, Iran.

== Demographics ==
=== Population ===
At the time of the 2006 National Census, the village's population was 63 in 13 households, when it was in Mamulan District (Note: Renamed the Central District of Mamulan County) of Pol-e Dokhtar County. The 2016 census measured the population of the village as zero.

In 2023, the district was separated from the county in the establishment of Mamulan County and renamed the Central District. The rural district was transferred to the new Afrineh District.
