= Miyankuh-e Sharqi Rural District =

Rural district in Lorestan province, Iran

Miyankuh-e Sharqi Rural District Persian: دهستان ميانكوه شرقي
- Rural District
- Location within Iran
- Coordinates: 33°13′38″N 48°12′18″E
- Country: Iran
- Province: Lorestan
- County: Mamulan
- District: Afrineh
- Established: 1987
- Capital: Zirtang-e Chameshk

Population (2016)
  - Total: 3,746
- Time zone: UTC+3:30 (IRST)

Miyankuh-e Sharqi Rural District (Persian: دهستان ميانكوه شرقي) is in Afrineh District of Mamulan County, Lorestan province, Iran. Its capital is the village of Zirtang-e Chameshk.

== Demographics ==
=== Population ===
During the 2006 National Census, the rural district's population (as a part of Mamulan District (Note: Renamed the Central District of Mamulan County) in Pol-e Dokhtar County) was 4,907 in 1,038 households. There were 4,250 inhabitants in 1,074 households at the 2011 census. The 2016 census measured the population of the rural district as 3,746 in 1,046 households. The most populous of its 46 villages was Qaleh Nasir (now in Afrineh Rural District), with 384 people.

In 2023, the district was separated from the county during the establishment of Mamulan County and named the Central District. The rural district was transferred to the new Afrineh District.

=== Other villages in the rural district ===
- Balavan
- Boneh Ju
- Darbagheh
- Darreh Gar
- Darreh Seyyed
- Deh-e Bozorg
- Gachi
- Jadow Ab
- Khargalu
- Kugan Baraftab
- Kugan Nasar
- Mian Tagan
- Morgh Mohsen-e Tai
- Posht Ju
- Posht Tang-e Chameshk
- Rikhan-e Do
- Rikhan-e Seh
- Rikhan-e Yek
