= Darreh Gar =

Village in Lorestan province, Iran

Darreh Gar Persian: دره گر
- Village
- Location within Iran
- Coordinates: 33°10′36″N 48°16′10″E
- Country: Iran
- Province: Lorestan
- County: Mamulan
- District: Afrineh
- Rural District: Miyankuh-e Sharqi

Population (2016)
  - Total: 44
- Time zone: UTC+3:30 (IRST)

Darreh Gar (Persian: دره گر) (Note: Also known as Darreh Garreh, Darreh Giri, and Darreh Gīrī) is a village in Miyankuh-e Sharqi Rural District of Afrineh District in Mamulan County, Lorestan province, Iran.

== Demographics ==
=== Population ===
At the time of the 2006 National Census, the village's population was 87 in 18 households, when it was in Mamulan District (Note: Renamed the Central District of Mamulan County) of Pol-e Dokhtar County. The following census in 2011 counted 66 people in 17 households. The 2016 census measured the population of the village as 44 people in 13 households.

In 2023, the district was separated from the county in the establishment of Mamulan County and renamed the Central District. The rural district was transferred to the new Afrineh District.
