= Zirtang-e Chameshk =

Village in Lorestan province, Iran

Zirtang-e Chameshk Persian: زيرتنگ چمشک
- Village
- Location within Iran
- Coordinates: 33°13′38″N 48°12′18″E
- Country: Iran
- Province: Lorestan
- County: Mamulan
- District: Afrineh
- Rural District: Miyankuh-e Sharqi

Population (2016)
  - Total: 239
- Time zone: UTC+3:30 (IRST)

Zirtang-e Chameshk (Persian: زيرتنگ چمشک) (Note: Also romanized as Zīrtang-e Chameshk) is a village in, and the capital of, Miyankuh-e Sharqi Rural District in Afrineh District of Mamulan County, Lorestan province, Iran.

== Demographics ==
=== Population ===
At the time of the 2006 National Census, the village's population was 398 in 84 households, when it was in Mamulan District (Note: Renamed the Central District of Mamulan County) of Pol-e Dokhtar County. The following census in 2011 counted 366 people in 83 households. The 2016 census measured the population of the village as 239 people in 69 households.

In 2023, the district was separated from the county in the establishment of Mamulan County and renamed the Central District. The rural district was transferred to the new Afrineh District.
