= Dastak-e Olya =

Dastak-e Olya دستك عليا
- Village
- Location within Iran
- Coordinates: 34°31′32″N 45°49′55″E
- Country: Iran
- Province: Kermanshah
- County: Sarpol-e Zahab
- Bakhsh: Central
- Rural District: Howmeh-ye Sarpol

Population (2006)
  - Total: 88
- Time zone: UTC+3:30 (IRST)
  - Summer (DST): UTC+4:30 (IRDT)

Dastak-e Olya (Persian: دستك عليا, also Romanized as Dastak-e ‘Olyā; also known as Dastak) is a village in Howmeh-ye Sarpol Rural District, in the Central District of Sarpol-e Zahab County, Kermanshah Province, Iran. At the 2006 census, its population was 88, in 22 families.
