= Boneh-ye Majid =

Boneh-ye Majid بنه مجيد
- Village
- Location within Iran
- Coordinates: 32°10′00″N 49°29′00″E
- Country: Iran
- Province: Khuzestan
- County: Andika
- Bakhsh: Central
- Rural District: Qaleh-ye Khvajeh

Population (2006)
  - Total: 69
- Time zone: UTC+3:30 (IRST)
  - Summer (DST): UTC+4:30 (IRDT)

Boneh-ye Majid (Persian: بنه مجيد, also Romanized as Boneh-ye Majīd; also known as Nargesī) is a village in Qaleh-ye Khvajeh Rural District, in the Central District of Andika County, Khuzestan Province, Iran. At the 2006 census, its population was 69, in 12 families.
