= Choghamish, Iran =

City in Khuzestan province, Iran

Choghamish Persian: چغاميش
- City
- Location within Iran
- Coordinates: 32°12′32″N 48°32′43″E
- Country: Iran
- Province: Khuzestan
- County: Dezful
- District: Choghamish

Population (2016)
  - Total: 2,013
- Time zone: UTC+3:30 (IRST)

Choghamish (Persian: چغاميش) (Note: Also romanized as Choghā Mīsh and Choghāmīsh; also known as Choghā Mīsheh-ye Dowlatī and Shahrak-e Choghā Mīsh) is a city in, and the capital of, Choghamish District of Dezful County, Khuzestan province, Iran. It also serves as the administrative center for Choghamish Rural District.

== Demographics ==
=== Population ===
At the time of the 2006 National Census, Choghamish's population was 1,967 in 380 households, when it was a village in Choghamish Rural District. The following census in 2011 counted 2,113 people in 434 households, by which time Choghamish had been elevated to the status of a city. The 2016 census measured the population of the city as 2,013 people in 505 households.
