= Boneh Anbar =

Boneh Anbar بنه انبار
- Village
- Location within Iran
- Coordinates: 30°37′15″N 50°26′24″E
- Country: Iran
- Province: Khuzestan
- County: Behbahan
- Bakhsh: Central
- Rural District: Howmeh

Population (2006)
  - Total: 23
- Time zone: UTC+3:30 (IRST)
  - Summer (DST): UTC+4:30 (IRDT)

Boneh Anbar (Persian: بنه انبار, also Romanized as Boneh Ānbār; also known as Bonehānbār) is a village in Howmeh Rural District, in the Central District of Behbahan County, Khuzestan Province, Iran. At the 2006 census, its population was 23, in 4 families.
