= Boneh-ye Musa =

Boneh-ye Musa بنه موسي
- Village
- Country: Iran
- Province: Khuzestan
- County: Andika
- Bakhsh: Chelo
- Rural District: Lalar and Katak

Population (2006)
  - Total: 131
- Time zone: UTC+3:30 (IRST)
  - Summer (DST): UTC+4:30 (IRDT)

Boneh-ye Musa (Persian: بنه موسي, also Romanized as Boneh-ye Mūsá) is a village in Lalar and Katak Rural District, Chelo District, Andika County, Khuzestan Province, Iran. At the 2006 census, its population was 131, in 23 families.
