= Kugan Baraftab =

Village in Lorestan province, Iran

Kugan Baraftab Persian: كوگان برافتاب
- Village
- Location within Iran
- Country: Iran
- Province: Lorestan
- County: Mamulan
- District: Afrineh
- Rural District: Miyankuh-e Sharqi

Population (2016)
  - Total: 26
- Time zone: UTC+3:30 (IRST)

Kugan Baraftab (Persian: كوگان برافتاب) (Note: Also romanized as Kūgān Barāftāb; also known as Gabgān, Kabgān, Kabkān, and Kūgān) is a village in Miyankuh-e Sharqi Rural District of Afrineh District in Mamulan County, Lorestan province, Iran.

== Demographics ==
=== Population ===
At the time of the 2006 National Census, the village's population was 42 in nine households, when it was in Mamulan District (Note: Renamed the Central District of Mamulan County) of Pol-e Dokhtar County. The following census in 2011 counted 39 people in 11 households. The 2016 census measured the population of the village as 26 people in eight households.

In 2023, the district was separated from the county in the establishment of Mamulan County and renamed the Central District. The rural district was transferred to the new Afrineh District.
