= Owlad =

Owlad اولاد
- Village
- Location within Iran
- Coordinates: 32°03′07″N 49°29′22″E
- Country: Iran
- Province: Khuzestan
- County: Andika
- Bakhsh: Abezhdan
- Rural District: Abezhdan

Population (2006)
  - Total: 299
- Time zone: UTC+3:30 (IRST)
  - Summer (DST): UTC+4:30 (IRDT)

Owlad (Persian: اولاد, also Romanized as Owlād; also known as Boneh-ye Owlād) is a village in Abezhdan Rural District, Abezhdan District, Andika County, Khuzestan Province, Iran. At the 2006 census, its population was 299, in 62 families.
