= Boneh-ye Ahmad =

Boneh-ye Ahmad بنه احمد
- Village
- Location within Iran
- Coordinates: 29°59′04″N 50°16′08″E
- Country: Iran
- Province: Bushehr
- County: Deylam
- Bakhsh: Central
- Rural District: Liravi-ye Shomali

Population (2006)
  - Total: 45
- Time zone: UTC+3:30 (IRST)
  - Summer (DST): UTC+4:30 (IRDT)

Boneh-ye Ahmad (Persian: بنه احمد, also Romanized as Boneh-ye Aḩmad and Boneh Aḩmad) is a village in Liravi-ye Shomali Rural District, in the Central District of Deylam County, Bushehr Province, Iran. At the 2006 census, its population was 45, in 10 families.
