= Rikhan-e Seh =

Village in Lorestan province, Iran

Rikhan-e Seh Persian: ريخان سه
- Village
- Location within Iran
- Coordinates: 33°17′13″N 48°09′07″E
- Country: Iran
- Province: Lorestan
- County: Mamulan
- District: Afrineh
- Rural District: Miyankuh-e Sharqi

Population (2016)
  - Total: 20
- Time zone: UTC+3:30 (IRST)

Rikhan-e Seh (Persian: ريخان سه) (Note: Also romanized as Rīkhān-e Seh) is a village in Miyankuh-e Sharqi Rural District of Afrineh District in Mamulan County, Lorestan province, Iran.

== Demographics ==
=== Population ===
At the time of the 2006 National Census, the village's population was 43 in 10 households, when it was in Mamulan District (Note: Renamed the Central District of Mamulan County) of Pol-e Dokhtar County. The following census in 2011 counted 57 people in 13 households. The 2016 census measured the population of the village as 20 people in eight households.

In 2023, the district was separated from the county in the establishment of Mamulan County and renamed the Central District. The rural district was transferred to the new Afrineh District.
