= Kamtuleh-ye Yusefabad =

Kamtuleh-ye Yusefabad كمتوله يوسف اباد
- Village
- Location within Iran
- Coordinates: 31°15′53″N 49°33′26″E
- Country: Iran
- Province: Khuzestan
- County: Ramhormoz
- Bakhsh: Central
- Rural District: Howmeh-ye Gharbi

Population (2006)
  - Total: 146
- Time zone: UTC+3:30 (IRST)
  - Summer (DST): UTC+4:30 (IRDT)

Kamtuleh-ye Yusefabad (Persian: كمتوله يوسف اباد, also Romanized as Kamtūleh-ye Yūsefābād) is a village in Howmeh-ye Gharbi Rural District, in the Central District of Ramhormoz County, Khuzestan Province, Iran. At the 2006 census, its population was 146, in 31 families.
