= Gobeyr =

Gobeyr گبير
- Village
- Location within Iran
- Coordinates: 31°52′36″N 48°51′33″E
- Country: Iran
- Province: Khuzestan
- County: Shushtar
- Bakhsh: Shadravan
- Rural District: Shoaybiyeh-ye Sharqi

Population (2006)
  - Total: 138
- Time zone: UTC+3:30 (IRST)
  - Summer (DST): UTC+4:30 (IRDT)

Gobeyr (Persian: گبير; also known as Boneh-ye ‘Alī-Mardān Khān and Gobeyr-e Pā’īn) is a village in Shoaybiyeh-ye Sharqi Rural District, Shadravan District, Shushtar County, Khuzestan Province, Iran. At the 2006 census, its population was 138, in 23 families.
