= Hajj Ali Hiki =

Hajj Ali Hiki حاج‌علی هیکی
- Village
- Location within Iran
- Coordinates: 32°54′32″N 48°20′39″E
- Country: Iran
- Province: Khuzestan
- County: Andimeshk
- Bakhsh: Alvar-e Garmsiri
- Rural District: Qilab

Population (2006)
  - Total: 72
- Time zone: UTC+3:30 (IRST)
  - Summer (DST): UTC+4:30 (IRDT)

Hajj Ali Hiki (Persian: حاج‌علی هیکی, also Romanized as Ḩājī ‘Alī Hīkī; also known as Boneh-ye Ḩājī ‘Alī, Boneh-ye Ḩājjī ‘Alī, and Ḩājjī ‘Alī Hīkī) is a village in Qilab Rural District, Alvar-e Garmsiri District, Andimeshk County, Khuzestan Province, Iran. At the 2006 census, its population was 72, in 11 families.
