= Bon-e Navizan =

Bon-e Navizan بن نويزان
- Village
- Country: Iran
- Province: Kerman
- County: Anbarabad
- Bakhsh: Jebalbarez-e Jonubi
- Rural District: Nargesan

Population (2006)
  - Total: 44
- Time zone: UTC+3:30 (IRST)
  - Summer (DST): UTC+4:30 (IRDT)

Bon-e Navizan (Persian: بن نويزان, also Romanized as Bon-e Navīzān) is a village in Nargesan Rural District, Jebalbarez-e Jonubi District, Anbarabad County, Kerman Province, Iran. In 2006, its population was 44, in 10 families.
