= Cheshmeh Haqqi =

Cheshmeh Haqqi چشمه حقي
- Village
- Location within Iran
- Coordinates: 32°13′27″N 49°25′01″E
- Country: Iran
- Province: Khuzestan
- County: Andika
- Bakhsh: Central
- Rural District: Qaleh-ye Khvajeh

Population (2006)
  - Total: 166
- Time zone: UTC+3:30 (IRST)
  - Summer (DST): UTC+4:30 (IRDT)

Cheshmeh Haqqi (Persian: چشمه حقي, also Romanized as Cheshmeh Ḩaqqī and Cheshmeh-ye Ḩaqqī; also known as Boneh-ye Ḩaqqī) is a village in Qaleh-ye Khvajeh Rural District, in the Central District of Andika County, Khuzestan Province, Iran. At the 2006 census, its population was 166, in 24 families.
