= Boneh-ye Esmail =

Boneh-ye Esmail or Boneh Esmail or Boneh-e Esmail (Persian: بنه اسماعيل) may refer to:

- Boneh-ye Esmail, Bushehr
- Boneh-ye Esmail, Khuzestan
