= Bon-e Dab =

Bon-e Dab بون داب
- Village
- Location within Iran
- Coordinates: 32°34′00″N 49°06′00″E
- Country: Iran
- Province: Khuzestan
- County: Lali
- Bakhsh: Hati
- Rural District: Jastun Shah

Population (2006)
  - Total: 126
- Time zone: UTC+3:30 (IRST)
  - Summer (DST): UTC+4:30 (IRDT)

Bon-e Dab (Persian: بون داب, also Romanized as Bon-e Dāb) is a village in Jastun Shah Rural District, Hati District, Lali County, Khuzestan Province, Iran. At the 2006 census, its population was 126, in 22 families.
