= Boneh Ju =

Village in Lorestan province, Iran

Boneh Ju Persian: بنه جو
- Village
- Location within Iran
- Country: Iran
- Province: Lorestan
- County: Mamulan
- District: Afrineh
- Rural District: Miyankuh-e Sharqi

Population (2016)
  - Total: 18
- Time zone: UTC+3:30 (IRST)

Boneh Ju (Persian: بنه جو) (Note: Also romanized as Boneh Jū) is a village in Miyankuh-e Sharqi Rural District of Afrineh District in Mamulan County, Lorestan province, Iran.

== Demographics ==
=== Population ===
At the time of the 2006 National Census, the village's population was 29 in six households, when it was in Mamulan District (Note: Renamed the Central District of Mamulan County) of Pol-e Dokhtar County. The following census in 2011 counted 22 people in seven households. The 2016 census measured the population of the village as 18 people in six households.

In 2023, the district was separated from the county in the establishment of Mamulan County and renamed the Central District. The rural district was transferred to the new Afrineh District.
