= Boneh-ye Azim =

Boneh-ye Azim بنه عظيم
- Village
- Location within Iran
- Coordinates: 32°05′37″N 48°36′01″E
- Country: Iran
- Province: Khuzestan
- County: Shushtar
- Bakhsh: Central
- Rural District: Sardarabad

Population (2006)
  - Total: 497
- Time zone: UTC+3:30 (IRST)
  - Summer (DST): UTC+4:30 (IRDT)

Boneh-ye Azim (Persian: بنه عظيم, also Romanized as Boneh-ye ‘Az̧īm) is a village in Sardarabad Rural District, in the Central District of Shushtar County, Khuzestan Province, Iran. At the 2006 census, its population was 497, in 82 families.
