= Boneh-ye Hajji =

Boneh-ye Hajji بنه حاجي
- Village
- Location within Iran
- Coordinates: 31°13′05″N 49°35′35″E
- Country: Iran
- Province: Khuzestan
- County: Ramhormoz
- Bakhsh: Central
- Rural District: Howmeh-ye Sharqi

Population (2006)
  - Total: 199
- Time zone: UTC+3:30 (IRST)
  - Summer (DST): UTC+4:30 (IRDT)

Boneh-ye Hajji (Persian: بنه حاجي, also Romanized as Boneh-ye Ḩājjī) is a village in Howmeh-ye Sharqi Rural District, in the Central District of Ramhormoz County, Khuzestan Province, Iran. At the 2006 census, its population was 199, in 44 families.
