= Abu Sel Bikhat-e Bozorg =

Abu Sel Bikhat-e Bozorg ابوسلبيخات بزرگ
- Village
- Location within Iran
- Coordinates: 31°09′12″N 49°09′17″E
- Country: Iran
- Province: Khuzestan
- County: Ahvaz
- Bakhsh: Central
- Rural District: Gheyzaniyeh

Population (2006)
  - Total: 140
- Time zone: UTC+3:30 (IRST)
  - Summer (DST): UTC+4:30 (IRDT)

Abu Sel Bikhat-e Bozorg (Persian: ابوسلبيخات بزرگ, also Romanized as Abū Sel Bīkhāt-e Bozorg; also known as Abū Salījān, Abū Salīkhān, Abusalixân, Abū Seley Bīkhāt, Abū Seleyb Khān, Boneh, Bonneh, and Kūpāl) is a village in Gheyzaniyeh Rural District, in the Central District of Ahvaz County, Khuzestan Province, Iran. At the 2006 census, its population was 140, in 31 families.
