= Porzinastan =

Porzinastan پرزینستان
- Village
- Location within Iran
- Coordinates: 31°54′36″N 48°47′00″E
- Country: Iran
- Province: Khuzestan
- County: Shushtar
- Bakhsh: Shadravan
- Rural District: Shoaybiyeh-ye Gharbi

Population (2006)
  - Total: 204
- Time zone: UTC+3:30 (IRST)
  - Summer (DST): UTC+4:30 (IRDT)

Porzinastan (Persian: پرزینستان, also Romanized as Porzīnastān; also known as Boneh-ye Gholām‘alī, Gholām‘alī, and Porzanastān) is a village in Shoaybiyeh-ye Gharbi Rural District, Shadravan District, Shushtar County, Khuzestan Province, Iran. At the 2006 census, its population was 204, in 43 families.
