= Boneh-ye Ba Damuiyeh =

Boneh-ye Ba Damuiyeh بنه باداموئيه
- Village
- Location within Iran
- Coordinates: 28°36′36″N 56°52′20″E
- Country: Iran
- Province: Kerman
- County: Arzuiyeh
- Bakhsh: Central
- Rural District: Dehsard

Population (2006)
  - Total: 41
- Time zone: UTC+3:30 (IRST)
  - Summer (DST): UTC+4:30 (IRDT)

Boneh-ye Ba Damuiyeh (Persian: بنه باداموئيه, also Romanized as Boneh-ye Bā Dāmū’īyeh) is a village in Dehsard Rural District, in the Central District of Arzuiyeh County, Kerman Province, Iran. At the 2006 census, its population was 41, in 11 families.
