= Ghalim =

Ghalim غليم
- Village
- Location within Iran
- Coordinates: 31°53′23″N 48°59′04″E
- Country: Iran
- Province: Khuzestan
- County: Shushtar
- Bakhsh: Central
- Rural District: Miyan Ab-e Shomali

Population (2006)
  - Total: 276
- Time zone: UTC+3:30 (IRST)
  - Summer (DST): UTC+4:30 (IRDT)

Ghalim (Persian: غليم, also Romanized as Ghalīm; also known as Boneh-ye Ghalayem and Boneh-ye Ghalīm) is a village in Miyan Ab-e Shomali Rural District, in the Central District of Shushtar County, Khuzestan Province, Iran. At the 2006 census, its population was 276, in 40 families.
