= Toveyleh-ye Seyyed Taher =

Toveyleh-ye Seyyed Taher طويله سيدطاهر
- Village
- Location within Iran
- Coordinates: 31°23′08″N 49°07′54″E
- Country: Iran
- Province: Khuzestan
- County: Ahvaz
- Bakhsh: Central
- Rural District: Gheyzaniyeh

Population (2006)
  - Total: 58
- Time zone: UTC+3:30 (IRST)
  - Summer (DST): UTC+4:30 (IRDT)

Toveyleh-ye Seyyed Taher (Persian: طويله سيدطاهر, also Romanized as Ţoveyleh-ye Seyyed Ţāher and Ţavīleh Seyyed Ţāher' also known as Boneh Seyyed Tāher and Boneh-ye Seyyed Ţāher) is a village in Gheyzaniyeh Rural District, in the Central District of Ahvaz County, Khuzestan Province, Iran. At the 2006 census, its population was 58, in 10 families.
