= Boneh-ye Nejat =

Boneh-ye Nejat بنه نجات
- Village
- Location within Iran
- Coordinates: 31°51′47″N 48°43′51″E
- Country: Iran
- Province: Khuzestan
- County: Shushtar
- Bakhsh: Shadravan
- Rural District: Shoaybiyeh-ye Gharbi

Population (2006)
  - Total: 133
- Time zone: UTC+3:30 (IRST)
  - Summer (DST): UTC+4:30 (IRDT)

Boneh-ye Nejat (Persian: بنه نجات, also Romanized as Boneh-ye Nejāt) is a village in Shoaybiyeh-ye Gharbi Rural District, Shadravan District, Shushtar County, Khuzestan Province, Iran. At the 2006 census, its population was 133, in 28 families.
