= Balavan, Lorestan =

Village in Lorestan province, Iran

Balavan Persian: بلوان
- Village
- Location within Iran
- Country: Iran
- Province: Lorestan
- County: Mamulan
- District: Afrineh
- Rural District: Miyankuh-e Sharqi

Population (2016)
  - Total: 56
- Time zone: UTC+3:30 (IRST)

Balavan (Persian: بلوان) (Note: Also romanized as Balavān) is a village in Miyankuh-e Sharqi Rural District of Afrineh District in Mamulan County, Lorestan province, Iran.

== Demographics ==
=== Population ===
At the time of the 2006 National Census, the village's population was 95 in 19 households, when it was in Mamulan District (Note: Renamed the Central District of Mamulan County) of Pol-e Dokhtar County. The following census in 2011 counted 38 people in nine households. The 2016 census measured the population of the village as 56 people in 20 households.

In 2023, the district was separated from the county in the establishment of Mamulan County and renamed the Central District. The rural district was transferred to the new Afrineh District.
