= Boneh-ye Sib =

Boneh-ye Sib بنه سيب
- Village
- Location within Iran
- Coordinates: 28°36′33″N 58°05′21″E
- Country: Iran
- Province: Kerman
- County: Anbarabad
- Bakhsh: Central
- Rural District: Amjaz

Population (2006)
  - Total: 11
- Time zone: UTC+3:30 (IRST)
  - Summer (DST): UTC+4:30 (IRDT)

Boneh-ye Sib (Persian: بنه سيب, also Romanized as Boneh-ye Sīb and Boneh Sīb) is a village in Amjaz Rural District, in the Central District of Anbarabad County, Kerman Province, Iran. At the 2006 census, its population was 11, in 6 families.
