= Deh-e Sardar =

Deh-e Sardar ده سردار
- Village
- Location within Iran
- Coordinates: 27°23′07″N 53°07′16″E
- Country: Iran
- Province: Fars
- County: Lamerd
- Bakhsh: Central
- Rural District: Howmeh

Population (2006)
  - Total: 22
- Time zone: UTC+3:30 (IRST)
  - Summer (DST): UTC+4:30 (IRDT)

Deh-e Sardar (Persian: ده سردار, also Romanized as Deh-e Sardār; also known as Qal‘eh-e Sardār and Qal‘eh Sardār) is a village in Howmeh Rural District, in the Central District of Lamerd County, Fars province, Iran. At the 2006 census, its population was 22, in 5 families.
