= Boneh-ye Qobad =

Village in Khuzestan, Iran

Boneh-ye Qobad بنه قباد
- Village
- Location within Iran
- Coordinates: 31°45′10″N 49°36′41″E
- Country: Iran
- Province: Khuzestan
- County: Izeh
- Bakhsh: Central
- Rural District: Howmeh-ye Sharqi

Population (2006)
  - Total: 62
- Time zone: UTC+3:30 (IRST)
  - Summer (DST): UTC+4:30 (IRDT)

Boneh-ye Qobad (Persian: بنه قباد, also Romanized as Boneh-ye Qobād) is a village in Howmeh-ye Sharqi Rural District, in the Central District of Izeh County, Khuzestan Province, Iran. At the 2006 census, its population was 62, in 9 families.
