= Bon-e Gonbad =

Bon-e Gonbad بن گنبد
- Village
- Location within Iran
- Coordinates: 33°43′12″N 49°06′48″E
- Country: Iran
- Province: Markazi
- County: Shazand
- Bakhsh: Sarband
- Rural District: Malmir

Population (2006)
  - Total: 67
- Time zone: UTC+3:30 (IRST)
  - Summer (DST): UTC+4:30 (IRDT)

Bon-e Gonbad (Persian: بن گنبد, also Romanized as Bon Gonbad; also known as Bān Gonbad, Bankunbad, and Boneh Gonbad) is a village in Malmir Rural District, Sarband District, Shazand County, Markazi Province, Iran. At the 2006 census, its population was 67, in 19 families.
