= Shah Rahzan =

Shah Rahzan شاهراه زن
- Village
- Location within Iran
- Coordinates: 31°39′42″N 49°49′50″E
- Country: Iran
- Province: Khuzestan
- County: Bagh-e Malek
- Bakhsh: Central
- Rural District: Qaleh Tall

Population (2006)
  - Total: 68
- Time zone: UTC+3:30 (IRST)
  - Summer (DST): UTC+4:30 (IRDT)

Shah Rahzan (Persian: شاهراه زن, also Romanized as Shāh Rāhzan; also known as Boneh-ye Shāh Rezā ‘Arab, Bunneh Shāh Rahzan Arab, and Shāh Rāzan) is a village in Qaleh Tall Rural District, in the Central District of Bagh-e Malek County, Khuzestan Province, Iran. At the 2006 census, its population was 68, in 16 families.
