= Reykhan, South Khorasan =

Reykhan ريخان
- Village
- Location within Iran
- Coordinates: 33°01′31″N 59°26′29″E
- Country: Iran
- Province: South Khorasan
- County: Birjand
- Bakhsh: Central
- Rural District: Kahshang

Population (2006)
  - Total: 40
- Time zone: UTC+3:30 (IRST)
  - Summer (DST): UTC+4:30 (IRDT)

Reykhan (Persian: ريخان, also Romanized as Reykhān; also known as Raikhund, Rakhūnd, Reykhand, and Reykhown) is a village in Kahshang Rural District, in the Central District of Birjand County, South Khorasan Province, Iran. At the 2006 census, its population was 40, in 15 families.
