= Ali Panah =

Ali Panah علي پناه
- Village
- Location within Iran
- Coordinates: 32°10′47″N 49°26′34″E
- Country: Iran
- Province: Khuzestan
- County: Andika
- Bakhsh: Central
- Rural District: Qaleh-ye Khvajeh

Population (2006)
  - Total: 34
- Time zone: UTC+3:30 (IRST)
  - Summer (DST): UTC+4:30 (IRDT)

Ali Panah (Persian: علي پناه, also Romanized as ‘Alī Panāh; also known as Boneh-ye ‘Alī) is a village in Qaleh-ye Khvajeh Rural District, in the Central District of Andika County, Khuzestan Province, Iran. At the 2006 census, its population was 34, in 7 families.
