= Boneh-ye Abed =

Boneh-ye Abed بنه عابد
- Village
- Location within Iran
- Coordinates: 29°39′48″N 51°34′55″E
- Country: Iran
- Province: Fars
- County: Kazerun
- Bakhsh: Central
- Rural District: Deris

Population (2006)
  - Total: 224
- Time zone: UTC+3:30 (IRST)
  - Summer (DST): UTC+4:30 (IRDT)

Boneh-ye Abed (Persian: بنه عابد, also Romanized as Boneh-ye 'Ābed) is a village in Deris Rural District, in the Central District of Kazerun County, Fars province, Iran. At the 2006 census, its population was 224, in 47 families.
