= Boneh-ye Shir Mohammad =

Boneh-ye Shir Mohammad بنه شيرمحمد
- Village
- Country: Iran
- Province: Khuzestan
- County: Andika
- Bakhsh: Chelo
- Rural District: Lalar and Katak

Population (2006)
  - Total: 196
- Time zone: UTC+3:30 (IRST)
  - Summer (DST): UTC+4:30 (IRDT)

Boneh-ye Shir Mohammad (Persian: بنه شيرمحمد, also Romanized as Boneh-ye Shīr Moḩammad) is a village in Lalar and Katak Rural District, Chelo District, Andika County, Khuzestan Province, Iran. At the 2006 census, its population was 196, in 31 families.
