= Boneh-ye Pir =

Boneh-ye Pir بنه پير
- Village
- Location within Iran
- Coordinates: 30°06′31″N 50°42′03″E
- Country: Iran
- Province: Kohgiluyeh and Boyer-Ahmad
- County: Gachsaran
- Bakhsh: Central
- Rural District: Bibi Hakimeh

Population (2006)
  - Total: 156
- Time zone: UTC+3:30 (IRST)
  - Summer (DST): UTC+4:30 (IRDT)

Boneh-ye Pir (Persian: بنه پير, also Romanized as Boneh-ye Pīr and Boneh Pīr; also known as Bān Pīr) is a village in Bibi Hakimeh Rural District, in the Central District of Gachsaran County, Kohgiluyeh and Boyer-Ahmad Province, Iran. At the 2006 census, its population was 156, in 39 families.
