= Bon Shovar =

Bon Shovar بن شوار
- Village
- Location within Iran
- Coordinates: 31°19′58″N 50°07′38″E
- Country: Iran
- Province: Khuzestan
- County: Bagh-e Malek
- Bakhsh: Seydun
- Rural District: Seydun-e Jonubi

Population (2006)
  - Total: 1,019
- Time zone: UTC+3:30 (IRST)
  - Summer (DST): UTC+4:30 (IRDT)

Bon Shovar (Persian: بن شوار, also Romanized as Bon Shovār, Ban Shovar, Bon Shevār, and Bon Shūr; also known as Band-e Shovār) is a village in Seydun-e Jonubi Rural District, Seydun District, Bagh-e Malek County, Khuzestan Province, Iran. At the 2006 census, its population was 1,019, in 170 families.
