= Boneh-ye Jan Mohammad =

Boneh-ye Jan Mohammad بنه جان محمد
- Village
- Country: Iran
- Province: Khuzestan
- County: Lali
- Bakhsh: Central
- Rural District: Sadat

Population (2006)
  - Total: 33
- Time zone: UTC+3:30 (IRST)
  - Summer (DST): UTC+4:30 (IRDT)

Boneh-ye Jan Mohammad (Persian: بنه جان محمد, also Romanized as Boneh-ye Jān Moḩammad) is a village in Sadat Rural District, in the Central District of Lali County, Khuzestan Province, Iran. At the 2006 census, its population was 33, in 6 families.
