= Boneh-ye Atabak =

Boneh-ye Atabak بنه اتابك
- Village
- Location within Iran
- Coordinates: 31°10′34″N 49°36′44″E
- Country: Iran
- Province: Khuzestan
- County: Ramhormoz
- Bakhsh: Central
- Rural District: Howmeh-ye Sharqi

Population (2006)
  - Total: 67
- Time zone: UTC+3:30 (IRST)
  - Summer (DST): UTC+4:30 (IRDT)

Boneh-ye Atabak (Persian: بنه اتابك, also Romanized as Boneh-ye Atābak and Boneh Atābak) is a village in Howmeh-ye Sharqi Rural District, in the Central District of Ramhormoz County, Khuzestan Province, Iran. At the 2006 census, its population was 67, in 17 families.
