= Boneh-ye Qeysar =

Boneh-ye Qeysar بنه قيصر
- Village
- Location within Iran
- Coordinates: 32°17′23″N 48°35′39″E
- Country: Iran
- Province: Khuzestan
- County: Dezful
- Bakhsh: Sardasht
- Rural District: Mahur Berenji

Population (2006)
  - Total: 131
- Time zone: UTC+3:30 (IRST)
  - Summer (DST): UTC+4:30 (IRDT)

Boneh-ye Qeysar (Persian: بنه قيصر, also Romanized as Boneh-ye Qeyşar and Boneh Qeysar; also known as Boneh Gheisar and Qeyşarābād) is a village in Mahur Berenji Rural District, Sardasht District, Dezful County, Khuzestan Province, Iran. At the 2006 census, its population was 131, in 18 families.
