= Boneh Var-e Baba Ahmadi =

Boneh Var-e Baba Ahmadi بنه واربابااحمد
- Village
- Location within Iran
- Coordinates: 32°18′20″N 49°19′08″E
- Country: Iran
- Province: Khuzestan
- County: Lali
- Bakhsh: Central
- Rural District: Sadat

Population (2006)
  - Total: 113
- Time zone: UTC+3:30 (IRST)
  - Summer (DST): UTC+4:30 (IRDT)

Boneh Var-e Baba Ahmadi (Persian: بنه واربابااحمد, also Romanized as Boneh Vār-e Bābā Aḩmadī; also known as Boned Vār-e Bābā Aḩmadī and Boneh Vār) is a village in Sadat Rural District, in the Central District of Lali County, Khuzestan Province, Iran. At the 2006 census, its population was 113, in 23 families.
