= Boneh Kaghi =

Boneh Kaghi بنه كاغي
- Village
- Location within Iran
- Coordinates: 38°44′15″N 46°46′42″E
- Country: Iran
- Province: East Azerbaijan
- County: Varzaqan
- Bakhsh: Central
- Rural District: Ozomdel-e Shomali

Population (2006)
  - Total: 162
- Time zone: UTC+3:30 (IRST)
  - Summer (DST): UTC+4:30 (IRDT)

Boneh Kaghi (Persian: بنه كاغي, also Romanized as Boneh Kāghī; also known as Bīnā Keyājī, Binakiagi, and Byanekyagi) is a village in Ozomdel-e Shomali Rural District, in the Central District of Varzaqan County, East Azerbaijan Province, Iran. At the 2006 census, its population was 162, in 27 families.
