= Boneh-ye Mirza =

Boneh-ye Mirza بنه ميرزا
- Village
- Country: Iran
- Province: Khuzestan
- County: Dezful
- Bakhsh: Sardasht
- Rural District: Shahi

Population (2006)
  - Total: 36
- Time zone: UTC+3:30 (IRST)
  - Summer (DST): UTC+4:30 (IRDT)

Boneh-ye Mirza (Persian: بنه ميرزا, also Romanized as Boneh-ye Mīrzā) is a village in Shahi Rural District, Sardasht District, Dezful County, Khuzestan Province, Iran. At the 2006 census, its population was 36, in 7 families.
