= Boneh-ye Qeytas =

Boneh-ye Qeytas بنه قيطاس
- Village
- Location within Iran
- Coordinates: 31°03′37″N 49°41′56″E
- Country: Iran
- Province: Khuzestan
- County: Ramhormoz
- Bakhsh: Central
- Rural District: Soltanabad

Population (2006)
  - Total: 185
- Time zone: UTC+3:30 (IRST)
  - Summer (DST): UTC+4:30 (IRDT)

Boneh-ye Qeytas (Persian: بنه قيطاس, also Romanized as Boneh-ye Qeyţās) is a village in Soltanabad Rural District, in the Central District of Ramhormoz County, Khuzestan Province, Iran. At the 2006 census, its population was 185, in 44 families.
