= Bon Konar =

Bon Konar بن كنار
- Village
- Location within Iran
- Coordinates: 31°52′07″N 49°38′34″E
- Country: Iran
- Province: Khuzestan
- County: Izeh
- Bakhsh: Central
- Rural District: Margha

Population (2006)
  - Total: 29
- Time zone: UTC+3:30 (IRST)
  - Summer (DST): UTC+4:30 (IRDT)

Bon Konar (Persian: بن كنار, also Romanized as Bon Konār) is a village in Margha Rural District, in the Central District of Izeh County, Khuzestan Province, Iran. At the 2006 census, its population was 29, in 5 families.
