= Boneh Posht =

Boneh Posht بنه پشت
- Village
- Location within Iran
- Coordinates: 29°21′48″N 56°38′08″E
- Country: Iran
- Province: Kerman
- County: Baft
- Bakhsh: Central
- Rural District: Kiskan

Population (2006)
  - Total: 69
- Time zone: UTC+3:30 (IRST)
  - Summer (DST): UTC+4:30 (IRDT)

Boneh Posht (Persian: بنه پشت) is a village in Kiskan Rural District, in the Central District of Baft County, Kerman Province, Iran. At the 2006 census, its population was 69, in 16 families.
