= Firuzabad, Dezful =

Firuzabad فيروزاباد
- Village
- Location within Iran
- Coordinates: 32°17′02″N 48°36′09″E
- Country: Iran
- Province: Khuzestan
- County: Dezful
- Bakhsh: Sardasht
- Rural District: Mahur Berenji

Population (2006)
  - Total: 371
- Time zone: UTC+3:30 (IRST)
  - Summer (DST): UTC+4:30 (IRDT)

Firuzabad (Persian: فيروزاباد, also Romanized as Fīrūzābād and Firooz Abad; also known as Boneh-ye Gholāmreẕa) is a village in Mahur Berenji Rural District, Sardasht District, Dezful County, Khuzestan Province, Iran. At the 2006 census, its population was 371, in 85 families.
