= Boneh Sukhteh, Kerman =

Boneh Sukhteh بنه سوخته
- Village
- Location within Iran
- Coordinates: 29°01′05″N 57°02′34″E
- Country: Iran
- Province: Kerman
- County: Rabor
- Bakhsh: Hanza
- Rural District: Javaran

Population (2006)
  - Total: 105
- Time zone: UTC+3:30 (IRST)
  - Summer (DST): UTC+4:30 (IRDT)

Boneh Sukhteh (Persian: بنه سوخته, also Romanized as Boneh Sūkhteh) is a village in Javaran Rural District, Hanza District, Rabor County, Kerman Province, Iran. At the 2006 census, its population was 105, in 28 families.
