= Aqa Bozorg =

Aqa Bozorg آقابزرگ
- Village
- Location within Iran
- Coordinates: 32°54′46″N 48°21′24″E
- Country: Iran
- Province: Khuzestan
- County: Andimeshk
- Bakhsh: Alvar-e Garmsiri
- Rural District: Qilab

Population (2006)
  - Total: 56
- Time zone: UTC+3:30 (IRST)
  - Summer (DST): UTC+4:30 (IRDT)

Aqa Bozorg (Persian: آقابزرگ, also Romanized as Āqā Bozorg and Āqā-ye Bozorg; also known as Boneh-ye Āqā-ye Bozorg) is a village in Qilab Rural District, Alvar-e Garmsiri District, Andimeshk County, Khuzestan Province, Iran. At the 2006 census, its population was 56, in 9 families.
