= Arab Asad =

Arab Asad عرب اسد
- Village
- Location within Iran
- Coordinates: 31°51′41″N 48°53′15″E
- Country: Iran
- Province: Khuzestan
- County: Shushtar
- Bakhsh: Central
- Rural District: Miyan Ab

Population (2006)
  - Total: 895
- Time zone: UTC+3:30 (IRST)
  - Summer (DST): UTC+4:30 (IRDT)

Arab Asad (Persian: عرب اسد, also Romanized as ‘Arab Asad; also known as Asad Dāūd, Asad Dāvūd, and Boneh-ye Asad Dāvūd) is a village in Miyan Ab Rural District, in the Central District of Shushtar County, Khuzestan Province, Iran. In the 2006 census, its population was 895, in 130 families.
