= Boneh Sur =

Boneh Sur بنه سور
- Village
- Country: Iran
- Province: Fars
- County: Mamasani
- Bakhsh: Central
- Rural District: Jowzar

Population (2006)
  - Total: 17
- Time zone: UTC+4:30 (IRST)
  - Summer (DST): UTC+4:30 (IRDT)

Boneh Sur (Persian: بنه سور, also Romanized as Boneh Sūr) is a village in Jowzar Rural District, in the Central District of Mamasani County, Fars province, Iran. At the 2006 census, its population was 17, in 4 families.
