= Boneh-ye Sukhteh, Khuzestan =

Boneh-ye Sukhteh بنه سوخته
- Village
- Location within Iran
- Coordinates: 31°14′16″N 49°35′03″E
- Country: Iran
- Province: Khuzestan
- County: Ramhormoz
- Bakhsh: Central
- Rural District: Howmeh-ye Gharbi

Population (2006)
  - Total: 261
- Time zone: UTC+3:30 (IRST)
  - Summer (DST): UTC+4:30 (IRDT)

Boneh-ye Sukhteh (Persian: بنه سوخته, also Romanized as Boneh-ye Sūkhteh; also known as Sookhteh) is a village in Howmeh-ye Gharbi Rural District, in the Central District of Ramhormoz County, Khuzestan Province, Iran. At the 2006 census, its population was 261, in 58 families.
