= Boneh-ye Arun =

Bown-e-rown بنه ارون
- Village
- Location within Iran
- Coordinates: 31°52′53″N 50°04′11″E
- Country: Iran
- Province: Khuzestan
- County: Izeh
- Bakhsh: Dehdez
- Rural District: Donbaleh Rud-e Shomali

Population (2006)
  - Total: 99
- Time zone: UTC+3:30 (IRST)
  - Summer (DST): UTC+4:30 (IRDT)

Boneh-ye Arun (Persian: بنه ارون, also Romanized as Boneh-ye Ārūn; also known as Bonahārūn) is a village in Donbaleh Rud-e Shomali Rural District, Dehdez District, Izeh County, Khuzestan Province, Iran. At the 2006 census, its population was 99, in 18 families.
