= Boneh-ye Sahrab =

Boneh-ye Sohrab بنه سهراب
- Village
- Country: Iran
- Province: Khuzestan
- County: Ramhormoz
- Bakhsh: Central
- Rural District: Howmeh-ye Gharbi

Population (2006)
  - Total: 2,006
- Time zone: UTC+3:30 (IRST)
  - Summer (DST): UTC+4:30 (IRDT)

Boneh-ye Sohrab (Persian: بنه سهراب, also Romanized as Boneh-ye Sohrāb) is a village in Howmeh-ye Gharbi Rural District, in the Central District of Ramhormoz County, Khuzestan Province, Iran. At the 2006 census, its population was 2,006, in 421 families.
