= Ghanem, Iran =

Ghanem غانم
- Village
- Location within Iran
- Coordinates: 31°52′52″N 48°59′30″E
- Country: Iran
- Province: Khuzestan
- County: Shushtar
- Bakhsh: Central
- Rural District: Shahid Modarres

Population (2006)
  - Total: 511
- Time zone: UTC+3:30 (IRST)
  - Summer (DST): UTC+4:30 (IRDT)

Ghanem (Persian: غانم, also Romanized as Ghānem known as Boneh-ye Qā’em, Boneh-ye Qānem, Bonneh-ye Ghānem Morīshed, and Sūfān) is a village in Shahid Modarres Rural District, Central District, Shushtar County, Khuzestan Province, Iran. At the 2006 census, its population was 511, in 100 families.
