= Boneh-ye Cheragh, Howmeh-ye Gharbi =

Boneh-ye Cheragh بنه چراغ
- Village
- Location within Iran
- Coordinates: 31°14′23″N 49°34′51″E
- Country: Iran
- Province: Khuzestan
- County: Ramhormoz
- Bakhsh: Central
- Rural District: Howmeh-ye Gharbi

Population (2006)
  - Total: 244
- Time zone: UTC+3:30 (IRST)
  - Summer (DST): UTC+4:30 (IRDT)

Boneh-ye Cheragh (Persian: بنه چراغ, also Romanized as Boneh-ye Cherāgh; also known as Cherāgh) is a village in Howmeh-ye Gharbi Rural District, in the Central District of Ramhormoz County, Khuzestan Province, Iran. At the 2006 census, its population was 244, in 43 families.
