= Bon-e Esfandi =

Bon-e Esfandi بن اسفندي
- Village
- Location within Iran
- Coordinates: 29°10′00″N 57°49′33″E
- Country: Iran
- Province: Kerman
- County: Bam
- Bakhsh: Central
- Rural District: Howmeh

Population (2006)
  - Total: 54
- Time zone: UTC+3:30 (IRST)
  - Summer (DST): UTC+4:30 (IRDT)

Bon-e Esfandi (Persian: بن اسفندي, also Romanized as Bon-e Esfandī; also known as Boneh-ye Esfandī) is a village in Howmeh Rural District, in the Central District of Bam County, Kerman Province, Iran. At the 2006 census, its population was 54, in 12 families.
