= Boneh Razi =

Boneh Razi بنه رازي
- Village
- Location within Iran
- Coordinates: 29°15′10″N 56°59′01″E
- Country: Iran
- Province: Kerman
- County: Rabor
- Bakhsh: Hanza
- Rural District: Javaran

Population (2006)
  - Total: 41
- Time zone: UTC+3:30 (IRST)
  - Summer (DST): UTC+4:30 (IRDT)

Boneh Razi (Persian: بنه رازي, also Romanized as Boneh Rāzī; also known as Benehzārī) is a village in Javaran Rural District, Hanza District, Rabor County, Kerman Province, Iran. At the 2006 census, its population was 41, in 13 families.
