= Boneh-ye Rahimali =

Boneh-ye Rahimali بنه رحمالي
- Village
- Country: Iran
- Province: Khuzestan
- County: Izeh
- Bakhsh: Central
- Rural District: Holayjan

Population (2006)
  - Total: 186
- Time zone: UTC+3:30 (IRST)
  - Summer (DST): UTC+4:30 (IRDT)

Boneh-ye Rahimali (Persian: بنه رحمالي, also Romanized as Boneh Raḥimālī) is a village in Holayjan Rural District, in the Central District of Izeh County, Khuzestan Province, Iran. At the 2006 census, its population was 186, in 34 families.
