= Fazili, Fars =

Fazili فضيلي
- Village
- Location within Iran
- Coordinates: 30°11′39″N 51°38′54″E
- Country: Iran
- Province: Fars
- County: Mamasani
- Bakhsh: Central
- Rural District: Javid-e Mahuri

Population (2006)
  - Total: 49
- Time zone: UTC+3:30 (IRST)
  - Summer (DST): UTC+4:30 (IRDT)

Fazili (Persian: فضيلي, also Romanized as Faẕīlī; also known as Faẕīleh and Faẕīleh’ī) is a village in Javid-e Mahuri Rural District, in the Central District of Mamasani County, Fars province, Iran. At the 2006 census, its population was 49, in 13 families.
