= Boneh-ye Mirza Ali Akbar =

Boneh-ye Mirza Ali Akbar بنه ميرزاعلي اكبر
- Village
- Location within Iran
- Coordinates: 29°39′20″N 51°35′18″E
- Country: Iran
- Province: Fars
- County: Kazerun
- Bakhsh: Central
- Rural District: Deris

Population (2006)
  - Total: 446
- Time zone: UTC+3:30 (IRST)
  - Summer (DST): UTC+4:30 (IRDT)

Boneh-ye Mirza Ali Akbar (Persian: بنه ميرزاعلي اكبر, also Romanized as Boneh-ye Mīrzā 'Alī Akbar; also known as Boneh Mīrzā 'Alī and Boneh-ye Ḩājj Mīrzā 'Alī) is a village in Deris Rural District, in the Central District of Kazerun County, Fars province, Iran. At the 2006 census, its population was 446, in 96 families.
