= Deylam-e Olya =

Deylam-e Olya ديلم عليا
- Village
- Location within Iran
- Coordinates: 32°09′43″N 48°25′39″E
- Country: Iran
- Province: Khuzestan
- County: Dezful
- Bakhsh: Central
- Rural District: Shamsabad

Population (2006)
  - Total: 143
- Time zone: UTC+3:30 (IRST)
  - Summer (DST): UTC+4:30 (IRDT)

Deylam-e Olya (Persian: ديلم عليا, also Romanized as Deylam-e ‘Olyā; also known as Boneh-ye Zobeydeh) is a village in Shamsabad Rural District, in the Central District of Dezful County, Khuzestan Province, Iran. At the 2006 census, its population was 143, in 19 families.
