= Khumeh Zar-e Olya =

Village in Fars province, Iran

Khumeh Zar-e Olya Persian: خومه زار عليا
- Village
- Location within Iran
- Coordinates: 29°59′55″N 51°35′16″E
- Country: Iran
- Province: Fars
- County: Mamasani
- District: Central
- Rural District: Bakesh-e Yek

Population (2016)
  - Total: 55
- Time zone: UTC+3:30 (IRST)

Khumeh Zar-e Olya (Persian: خومه زارعليا) (Note: Also romanized as Khūmeh Zār-e ‘Olyā; also known as Boneh-ye Khūmehzār, Khūmeh Zār, Shapachu, Shīb Jū, and Shīveh Jū) is a village in Bakesh-e Yek Rural District of the Central District of Mamasani County, Fars province, Iran.

== Demographics ==
=== Population ===
At the time of the 2006 National Census, the village's population was 93 in 21 households. The following census in 2011 counted 61 people in 17 households. The 2016 census measured the population of the village as 55 people in 14 households.
