= Do Boneh =

Do Boneh or Dowbaneh or Do Baneh or Dowbeneh (Persian: دوبنه) may refer to:

- Dowbaneh, Fars
- Do Boneh, Kerman
