= Kugan Nasar =

Village in Lorestan province, Iran

Kugan Nasar Persian: كوگان نسار
- Village
- Location within Iran
- Country: Iran
- Province: Lorestan
- County: Mamulan
- District: Afrineh
- Rural District: Miyankuh-e Sharqi

Population (2016)
  - Total: 17
- Time zone: UTC+3:30 (IRST)

Kugan Nasar (Persian: كوگان نسار) (Note: Also romanized as Kūgān Nasār) is a village in Miyankuh-e Sharqi Rural District of Afrineh District in Mamulan County, Lorestan province, Iran.

== Demographics ==
=== Population ===
At the time of the 2006 National Census, the village's population was 37 in seven households, when it was in Mamulan District (Note: Renamed the Central District of Mamulan County) of Pol-e Dokhtar County. The following census in 2011 counted 20 people in seven households. The 2016 census measured the population of the village as 17 people in six households.

In 2023, the district was separated from the county in the establishment of Mamulan County and renamed the Central District. The rural district was transferred to the new Afrineh District.
