= Boneh-ye Molla Ahmad =

Boneh-ye Molla Ahmad بنه ملااحمد
- Village
- Location within Iran
- Coordinates: 31°15′35″N 49°37′24″E
- Country: Iran
- Province: Khuzestan
- County: Ramhormoz
- Bakhsh: Central
- Rural District: Howmeh-ye Sharqi

Population (2006)
  - Total: 358
- Time zone: UTC+3:30 (IRST)
  - Summer (DST): UTC+4:30 (IRDT)

Boneh-ye Molla Ahmad (Persian: بنه ملااحمد, also Romanized as Boneh-ye Mollā Aḩmad) is a village in Howmeh-ye Sharqi Rural District, in the Central District of Ramhormoz County, Khuzestan Province, Iran. At the 2006 census, its population was 358, in 82 families.
