= Murd-e Ghaffar =

Murd-e Ghaffar موردغفار
- Village
- Location within Iran
- Coordinates: 31°45′50″N 49°44′57″E
- Country: Iran
- Province: Khuzestan
- County: Izeh
- Bakhsh: Central
- Rural District: Holayjan

Population (2006)
  - Total: 88
- Time zone: UTC+3:30 (IRST)
  - Summer (DST): UTC+4:30 (IRDT)

Murd-e Ghaffar (Persian: موردغفار, also Romanized as Mūrd-e Ghaffār and Moord Ghaffar; also known as Boneh-ye Mordeh Ghaffār, Boneh-ye Mūrt Ghaffār, and Bunneh Mūrdah Ghaffār) is a village in Holayjan Rural District, in the Central District of Izeh County, Khuzestan Province, Iran. At the 2006 census, its population was 88, in 18 families.
