= Boneh-ye Kazem =

Boneh-ye Kazem بنه كاظم
- Village
- Location within Iran
- Coordinates: 31°55′06″N 48°41′12″E
- Country: Iran
- Province: Khuzestan
- County: Shushtar
- Bakhsh: Shadravan
- Rural District: Shoaybiyeh-ye Gharbi

Population (2006)
  - Total: 144
- Time zone: UTC+3:30 (IRST)
  - Summer (DST): UTC+4:30 (IRDT)

Boneh-ye Kazem (Persian: بنه كاظم, also Romanized as Boneh-ye Kāz̧em; also known as Band-e Sho‘eybīyeh) is a village in Shoaybiyeh-ye Gharbi Rural District, Shadravan District, Shushtar County, Khuzestan Province, Iran. At the 2006 census, its population was 144, in 21 families.
