= Boneh-ye Cheragh, Soltanabad =

Village in Khuzestan, Iran

Boneh-ye Cheragh بنه چراغ
- Village
- Location within Iran
- Coordinates: 31°06′31″N 49°38′35″E
- Country: Iran
- Province: Khuzestan
- County: Ramhormoz
- Bakhsh: Central
- Rural District: Soltanabad

Population (2006)
  - Total: 125
- Time zone: UTC+3:30 (IRST)
  - Summer (DST): UTC+4:30 (IRDT)

Boneh-ye Cheragh (Persian: بنه چراغ, also Romanized as Boneh-ye Cherāgh; also known as Boneh-ye Ḩājjī Cherāgh and Cherāgh) is a village in Soltanabad Rural District, in the Central District of Ramhormoz County, Khuzestan Province, Iran. At the 2006 census, its population was 125, in 29 families.
