= Kamar Deraz =

Kamar Deraz كمردراز
- Village
- Location within Iran
- Coordinates: 31°42′04″N 49°51′56″E
- Country: Iran
- Province: Khuzestan
- County: Bagh-e Malek
- Bakhsh: Central
- Rural District: Qaleh Tall

Population (2006)
  - Total: 312
- Time zone: UTC+3:30 (IRST)
  - Summer (DST): UTC+4:30 (IRDT)

Kamar Deraz (Persian: كمردراز, also Romanized as Kamar Derāz; also known as Boneh-ye Kord and Boneh-ye Kordī) is a village in Qaleh Tall Rural District, in the Central District of Bagh-e Malek County, Khuzestan Province, Iran. At the 2006 census, its population was 312, in 58 families.
