= Bon Gahar =

Bon Gahar بن گهر
- Village
- Country: Iran
- Province: Hormozgan
- County: Hajjiabad
- Bakhsh: Ahmadi
- Rural District: Kuh Shah

Population (2006)
  - Total: 158
- Time zone: UTC+3:30 (IRST)
  - Summer (DST): UTC+4:30 (IRDT)

Bon Gahar (Persian: بن گهر) is a village in Kuh Shah Rural District, Ahmadi District, Hajjiabad County, Hormozgan Province, Iran. At the 2006 census, its population was 158, in 41 families.
