= Boneh Deraz =

Boneh Deraz بنه دراز
- Village
- Location within Iran
- Coordinates: 31°16′23″N 49°58′57″E
- Country: Iran
- Province: Khuzestan
- County: Bagh-e Malek
- Bakhsh: Meydavud
- Rural District: Saroleh

Population (2006)
  - Total: 267
- Time zone: UTC+3:30 (IRST)
  - Summer (DST): UTC+4:30 (IRDT)

Boneh Deraz (Persian: بنه دراز, also Romanized as Boneh Derāz; also known as Bonderāz) is a village in Saroleh Rural District, Meydavud District, Bagh-e Malek County, Khuzestan Province, Iran. At the 2006 census, its population was 267, in 56 families.
