= Boneh-ye Bad =

Boneh-ye Bad بنه باد
- Village
- Location within Iran
- Coordinates: 29°23′02″N 56°22′07″E
- Country: Iran
- Province: Kerman
- County: Baft
- Bakhsh: Central
- Rural District: Fathabad

Population (2006)
  - Total: 99
- Time zone: UTC+3:30 (IRST)
  - Summer (DST): UTC+4:30 (IRDT)

Boneh-ye Bad (Persian: بنه باد, also Romanized as Boneh-ye Bād; also known as Banehābād and Bonehābād) is a village in Fathabad Rural District, in the Central District of Baft County, Kerman Province, Iran. At the 2006 census, its population was 99, in 25 families.
