= Bon Khunik =

Bon Khunik بن خونيك
- Village
- Location within Iran
- Coordinates: 33°29′56″N 59°26′52″E
- Country: Iran
- Province: South Khorasan
- County: Zirkuh
- Bakhsh: Zohan
- Rural District: Afin

Population (2006)
  - Total: 98
- Time zone: UTC+3:30 (IRST)
  - Summer (DST): UTC+4:30 (IRDT)

Bon Khunik (Persian: بن خونيك, also Romanized as Bon Khūnīk and Ban Khūnīk; also known as Band Khūnīk) is a village in Afin Rural District, Zohan District, Zirkuh County, South Khorasan Province, Iran. At the 2006 census, its population was 98, in 30 families.
