= Boneh Alvan =

Boneh Alvan بنه علوان
- Village
- Location within Iran
- Coordinates: 32°06′00″N 48°29′00″E
- Country: Iran
- Province: Khuzestan
- County: Dezful
- Bakhsh: Central
- Rural District: Shamsabad

Population (2006)
  - Total: 125
- Time zone: UTC+3:30 (IRST)
  - Summer (DST): UTC+4:30 (IRDT)

Boneh Alvan (Persian: بنه علوان, also Romanized as Boneh Alvān and Boneh Alavan) is a village in Shamsabad Rural District, in the Central District of Dezful County, Khuzestan Province, Iran. At the 2006 census, its population was 125, in 17 families.
