= Boneh-ye Rezvan =

Boneh-ye Rezvan بنه رضوان
- Village
- Country: Iran
- Province: Kerman
- County: Jiroft
- Bakhsh: Jebalbarez
- Rural District: Rezvan

Population (2006)
  - Total: 15
- Time zone: UTC+3:30 (IRST)

Boneh-ye Rezvan (Persian: بنه رضوان, also Romanized as Boneh-ye Rez̤vān) is a village in Rezvan Rural District, Jebalbarez District, Jiroft County, Kerman Province, Iran. At the 2006 census, its population was 15, in 4 families.
