= Bon Honi =

Bon Honi بن هنی
- Village
- Location within Iran
- Coordinates: 32°48′13″N 48°19′38″E
- Country: Iran
- Province: Khuzestan
- County: Andimeshk
- Bakhsh: Alvar-e Garmsiri
- Rural District: Qilab

Population (2006)
  - Total: 166
- Time zone: UTC+3:30 (IRST)
  - Summer (DST): UTC+4:30 (IRDT)

Bon Honi (Persian: بن هنی, also Romanized as Bon Honī) is a village in Qilab Rural District, Alvar-e Garmsiri District, Andimeshk County, Khuzestan Province, Iran. At the 2006 census, its population was 166, in 27 families.
