= Boneh Balut, Kohgiluyeh and Boyer-Ahmad =

Boneh Balut بنه بلوط
- Village
- Location within Iran
- Coordinates: 30°57′46″N 50°27′56″E
- Country: Iran
- Province: Kohgiluyeh and Boyer-Ahmad
- County: Landeh
- Bakhsh: Central
- Rural District: Tayebi-ye Garmsiri-ye Shomali

Population (2006)
  - Total: 350
- Time zone: UTC+3:30 (IRST)
  - Summer (DST): UTC+4:30 (IRDT)

Boneh Balut (Persian: بنه بلوط, also Romanized as Boneh Balūţ; also known as Bon Balūţ) is a village in Tayebi-ye Garmsiri-ye Shomali Rural District, in the Central District of Landeh County, Kohgiluyeh and Boyer-Ahmad Province, Iran. At the 2006 census, its population was 350, in 54 families.
