= Boneh-ye Karim =

Boneh-ye Karim بنه كريم
- Village
- Location within Iran
- Coordinates: 31°15′53″N 49°35′00″E
- Country: Iran
- Province: Khuzestan
- County: Ramhormoz
- Bakhsh: Central
- Rural District: Howmeh-ye Gharbi

Population (2006)
  - Total: 279
- Time zone: UTC+3:30 (IRST)
  - Summer (DST): UTC+4:30 (IRDT)

Boneh-ye Karim (Persian: بنه كريم, also Romanized as Boneh-ye Karīm; also known as Boneh-ye Karīmī and Karīmī) is a village in Howmeh-ye Gharbi Rural District, in the Central District of Ramhormoz County, Khuzestan Province, Iran. At the 2006 census, its population was 279, in 61 families.
