= Boneh-ye Dari =

Boneh-ye Dari بنه درئ
- Village
- Location within Iran
- Coordinates: 28°31′42″N 55°23′40″E
- Country: Iran
- Province: Fars
- County: Darab
- Bakhsh: Rostaq
- Rural District: Kuhestan

Population (2006)
  - Total: 155
- Time zone: UTC+3:30 (IRST)
  - Summer (DST): UTC+4:30 (IRDT)

Boneh-ye Dari (Persian: بنه درئ, also Romanized as Boneh-ye Darī) is a village in Kuhestan Rural District, Rostaq District, Darab County, Fars province, Iran.

At the 2006 census, its population was 155, in 31 families.
