= Boneh-ye Chahar =

Village in Kerman, Iran

Boneh-ye Chahar بنه چهار
- Village
- Location within Iran
- Coordinates: 28°34′07″N 58°07′09″E
- Country: Iran
- Province: Kerman
- County: Anbarabad
- Bakhsh: Jebalbarez-e Jonubi
- Rural District: Garmsar

Population (2006)
  - Total: 91
- Time zone: UTC+3:30 (IRST)
  - Summer (DST): UTC+4:30 (IRDT)

Boneh-ye Chahar (Persian: بنه چهار, also Romanized as Boneh-ye Chahār; also known as Boneh-ye Chāreh) is a village in Garmsar Rural District, Jebalbarez-e Jonubi District, Anbarabad County, Kerman Province, Iran. At the 2006 census, its population was 91, in 21 families.
