= Rikhan-e Yek =

Village in Lorestan province, Iran

Rikhan-e Yek Persian: ريخان يك
- Village
- Location within Iran
- Coordinates: 33°16′16″N 48°11′47″E
- Country: Iran
- Province: Lorestan
- County: Mamulan
- District: Afrineh
- Rural District: Miyankuh-e Sharqi

Population (2016)
  - Total: 148
- Time zone: UTC+3:30 (IRST)

Rikhan-e Yek (Persian: ريخان يك) (Note: Also romanized as Rīkhān-e Yek) is a village in Miyankuh-e Sharqi Rural District of Afrineh District in Mamulan County, Lorestan province, Iran.

== Demographics ==
=== Population ===
At the time of the 2006 National Census, the village's population was 152 in 43 households, when it was in Mamulan District (Note: Renamed the Central District of Mamulan County) of Pol-e Dokhtar County. The following census in 2011 counted 159 people in 45 households. The 2016 census measured the population of the village as 148 people in 40 households.

In 2023, the district was separated from the county in the establishment of Mamulan County and renamed the Central District. The rural district was transferred to the new Afrineh District.
