= Posht Darb-e Olya =

Posht Darb-e Olya پشت درب عليا
- Village
- Location within Iran
- Coordinates: 32°13′32″N 48°53′49″E
- Country: Iran
- Province: Khuzestan
- County: Gotvand
- Bakhsh: Aghili
- Rural District: Aghili-ye Shomali

Population (2006)
  - Total: 285
- Time zone: UTC+3:30 (IRST)
  - Summer (DST): UTC+4:30 (IRDT)

Posht Darb-e Olya (Persian: پشت درب عليا, also romanized as Posht Darb-e ‘Olyā; also known as Boneh-ye Rahmānī) is a village in Aghili-ye Shomali Rural District, Aghili District, Gotvand County, Khuzestan Province, Iran. At the 2006 census, its population was 285, in 44 families.
