= Posht Darb-e Sofla =

Posht Darb-e Sofla پشتدربسفلي
- Village
- Location within Iran
- Coordinates: 32°13′20″N 48°55′47″E
- Country: Iran
- Province: Khuzestan
- County: Gotvand
- Bakhsh: Aghili
- Rural District: Aghili-ye Shomali

Population (2006)
  - Total: 294
- Time zone: UTC+3:30 (IRST)
  - Summer (DST): UTC+4:30 (IRDT)

Posht Darb-e Sofla (Persian: پشتدربسفلي, also Romanized as Posht Darb-e Soflá; also known as Boneh-ye ‘Abd and Boneh-ye ‘Abd or Rahman) is a village in Aghili-ye Shomali Rural District, Aghili District, Gotvand County, Khuzestan Province, Iran. At the 2006 census, its population was 294, in 46 families.
