= Kamtuleh-ye Shahriari =

Kamtuleh-ye Shahriari كمتوله شهرياري
- Village
- Location within Iran
- Coordinates: 31°15′38″N 49°33′16″E
- Country: Iran
- Province: Khuzestan
- County: Ramhormoz
- Bakhsh: Central
- Rural District: Howmeh-ye Gharbi

Population (2006)
  - Total: 120
- Time zone: UTC+3:30 (IRST)
  - Summer (DST): UTC+4:30 (IRDT)

Kamtuleh-ye Shahriari (Persian: كمتوله شهرياري, also Romanized as Kamtūleh-ye Shahrīārī; also known as Boneh-ye Kāmtūleh, Kamtooleh, and Kamtūleh) is a village in Howmeh-ye Gharbi Rural District, in the Central District of Ramhormoz County, Khuzestan Province, Iran. At the 2006 census, its population was 120, in 26 families.
