= Boneh-ye Ajam =

Boneh-ye Ajam بنه عجم
- Village
- Location within Iran
- Coordinates: 31°37′29″N 49°13′43″E
- Country: Iran
- Province: Khuzestan
- County: Haftgel
- Bakhsh: Raghiveh
- Rural District: Gazin

Population (2006)
  - Total: 131
- Time zone: UTC+3:30 (IRST)
  - Summer (DST): UTC+4:30 (IRDT)

Boneh-ye Ajam (Persian: بنه عجم, also Romanized as Boneh-ye ‘Ajam; also known as Bon ‘Ajam) is a village in Gazin Rural District, Raghiveh District, Haftgel County, Khuzestan Province, Iran. At the 2006 census, its population was 131, in 26 families.
