= Boneh Var-e Yaqub =

Boneh Var-e Yaqub بنه واريعقوب
- Village
- Location within Iran
- Coordinates: 33°15′00″N 48°48′00″E
- Country: Iran
- Province: Lorestan
- County: Aligudarz
- Bakhsh: Zaz and Mahru
- Rural District: Zaz-e Gharbi

Population (2006)
  - Total: 70
- Time zone: UTC+3:30 (IRST)
  - Summer (DST): UTC+4:30 (IRDT)

Boneh Var-e Yaqub (Persian: بنه واريعقوب, also Romanized as Boneh Vār-e Ya‘qūb and Bonvār-e Ya‘qūb) is a village in Zaz-e Gharbi Rural District, Zaz and Mahru District, Aligudarz County, Lorestan Province, Iran. At the 2006 census, its population was 70, in 15 families.
