= Boneh-ye Rashid =

Boneh-ye Rashid بنه رشيد
- Village
- Location within Iran
- Coordinates: 31°04′49″N 49°40′30″E
- Country: Iran
- Province: Khuzestan
- County: Ramhormoz
- Bakhsh: Central
- Rural District: Soltanabad

Population (2006)
  - Total: 727
- Time zone: UTC+3:30 (IRST)
  - Summer (DST): UTC+4:30 (IRDT)

Boneh-ye Rashid (Persian: بنه رشيد, also Romanized as Boneh-ye Rashīd; also known as Bon-e Rashīd and Bon Rashid) is a village in Soltanabad Rural District, in the Central District of Ramhormoz County, Khuzestan Province, Iran. At the 2006 census, its population was 727, in 144 families.
