= Dastak-e Sofla =

Dastak-e Sofla دستك سفلي
- Village
- Location within Iran
- Coordinates: 34°32′03″N 45°48′11″E
- Country: Iran
- Province: Kermanshah
- County: Sarpol-e Zahab
- Bakhsh: Central
- Rural District: Howmeh-ye Sarpol

Population (2006)
  - Total: 52
- Time zone: UTC+3:30 (IRST)
  - Summer (DST): UTC+4:30 (IRDT)

Dastak-e Sofla (Persian: دستك سفلي, also Romanized as Dastak-e Soflá; also known as Boneh Dastak) is a village in Howmeh-ye Sarpol Rural District, in the Central District of Sarpol-e Zahab County, Kermanshah Province, Iran. At the 2006 census, its population was 52, in 13 families.
