= Boneh Kuh =

Boneh Kuh بن كوه
- Village
- Location within Iran
- Coordinates: 26°57′58″N 54°45′12″E
- Country: Iran
- Province: Hormozgan
- County: Bandar Lengeh
- Bakhsh: Central
- Rural District: Mehran

Population (2006)
  - Total: 249
- Time zone: UTC+3:30 (IRST)
  - Summer (DST): UTC+4:30 (IRDT)

Boneh Kuh (Persian: بن كوه, also Romanized as Boneh Kūh; also known as Bon Kūh) is a village in Mehran Rural District, in the Central District of Bandar Lengeh County, Hormozgan Province, Iran. At the 2006 census, its population was 249, in 45 families.
