= Bon-e Gelu =

Bon-e Gelu بن گلو
- Village
- Location within Iran
- Coordinates: 28°20′14″N 58°24′32″E
- Country: Iran
- Province: Kerman
- County: Anbarabad
- Bakhsh: Jebalbarez-e Jonubi
- Rural District: Nargesan

Population (2006)
  - Total: 340
- Time zone: UTC+3:30 (IRST)
  - Summer (DST): UTC+4:30 (IRDT)

Bon-e Gelu (Persian: بن گلو, also Romanized as Bon-e Gelū; also known as Boneh-ye Gelū) is a village in Nargesan Rural District, Jebalbarez-e Jonubi District, Anbarabad County, Kerman Province, Iran. At the 2006 census, its population was 340, in 68 families.
