= Boneh-ye Abbas, Khuzestan =

Boneh-ye Abbas بنه عباس
- Village
- Location within Iran
- Coordinates: 31°01′48″N 49°43′07″E
- Country: Iran
- Province: Khuzestan
- County: Ramhormoz
- Bakhsh: Central
- Rural District: Soltanabad

Population (2006)
  - Total: 437
- Time zone: UTC+3:30 (IRST)
  - Summer (DST): UTC+4:30 (IRDT)

Boneh-ye Abbas (Persian: بنه عباس, also Romanized as Boneh-ye ‘Abbās; also known as Boneh Ghabbās and Gabbās) is a village in Soltanabad Rural District, in the Central District of Ramhormoz County, Khuzestan Province, Iran. At the 2006 census, its population was 437, in 87 families.
