= Boneh-ye Sukhteh Char =

Village in Kerman, Iran

Boneh-ye Sukhteh Char بنه سوخته چار
- Village
- Location within Iran
- Coordinates: 29°09′41″N 57°48′57″E
- Country: Iran
- Province: Kerman
- County: Bam
- Bakhsh: Central
- Rural District: Howmeh

Population (2006)
  - Total: 63
- Time zone: UTC+3:30 (IRST)
  - Summer (DST): UTC+4:30 (IRDT)

Boneh-ye Sukhteh Char (Persian: بنه سوخته چار, also Romanized as Boneh-ye Sūkhteh Chār; also known as Boneh-ye Sūkhteh and Boneh-ye Sūkhteh Chāl) is a village in Howmeh Rural District, in the Central District of Bam County, Kerman Province, Iran. At the 2006 census, its population was 63, in 13 families.
