= Kheybar Rural District =

Rural district in Khuzestan province, Iran

Kheybar Rural District Persian: دهستان خيبر
- Rural District
- Location within Iran
- Coordinates: 32°05′45″N 48°31′45″E
- Country: Iran
- Province: Khuzestan
- County: Dezful
- District: Choghamish
- Capital: Shahrak-e Kheybar

Population (2016)
  - Total: 15,595
- Time zone: UTC+3:30 (IRST)

Kheybar Rural District (Persian: دهستان خيبر) is in Choghamish District of Dezful County, Khuzestan province, Iran. Its capital is the village of Shahrak-e Kheybar.

== Demographics ==
=== Population ===
At the time of the 2006 National Census, the rural district's population was 13,320 in 2,490 households. There were 14,400 inhabitants in 3,292 households at the following census of 2011. The 2016 census measured the population of the rural district as 15,595 in 4,080 households. The most populous of its 24 villages was Shahrak-e Shahid Beheshti, with 3,351 people.
