= Choghamish Rural District =

Rural district in Khuzestan province, Iran

Choghamish Rural District Persian: دهستان چغامیش
- Rural District
- Location within Iran
- Coordinates: 32°14′27″N 48°33′18″E
- Country: Iran
- Province: Khuzestan
- County: Dezful
- District: Choghamish
- Capital: Choghamish

Population (2016)
  - Total: 13,577
- Time zone: UTC+3:30 (IRST)

Choghamish Rural District (Persian: دهستان چغامیش) is in Choghamish District of Dezful County, Khuzestan province, Iran. It is administered from the city of Choghamish.

== Demographics ==
=== Population ===
At the time of the 2006 National Census, the rural district's population was 15,041 in 3,004 households. There were 13,613 inhabitants in 3,352 households at the following census of 2011. The 2016 census measured the population of the rural district as 13,577 in 3,714 households. The most populous of its 20 villages was Eslamabad (now the city of Jandi Shapur), with 5,298 people.
