= Choghamish District =

District in Khuzestan province, Iran

Choghamish District Persian: بخش چغامیش
- District
- Location within Iran
- Coordinates: 32°09′45″N 48°33′26″E
- Country: Iran
- Province: Khuzestan
- County: Dezful
- Capital: Choghamish

Population (2016)
  - Total: 31,185
- Time zone: UTC+3:30 (IRST)

Choghamish District (Persian: بخش چغامیش) is in Dezful County, Khuzestan province, Iran. Its capital is the city of Choghamish.

== History ==
After the 2006 National Census, the village of Choghamish became a city. After the 2016 census, the village of Eslamabad was elevated to city status as Jandi Shapur.

== Demographics ==
=== Population ===
At the time of the 2006 census, the district's population was 28,361 in 5,494 households. The following census in 2011 counted 30,126 people in 7,078 households. The 2016 census measured the population of the district as 31,185 inhabitants in 8,299 households.

=== Administrative divisions ===
Choghamish District Population
Administrative Divisions	2006	2011	2016
Choghamish RD	15,041	13,613	13,577
Kheybar RD	13,320	14,400	15,595
Choghamish (city)		2,113	2,013
Jandi Shapur (city) (Note: Formerly the village of Eslamabad; became a city after the 2016 census)			
Total	28,361	30,126	31,185
RD = Rural District
