= Bar Aftab =

Bar Aftab or Baraftab (Persian: بَر آفتاب) may refer to:

== Chaharmahal and Bakhtiari province ==
- Bar Aftab-e Khonk, a village in Lordgegan County
- Bar Aftab-e Milas, a village in Lordgegan County
- Bar Aftab-e Sardasht, a village in Lordgegan County
- Bar Aftab-e Shidan, a village in Lordgegan County
- Bar Aftab-e Shirani, a village in Lordgegan County

== Fars province ==
- Bar Aftab, Fars, a village in Mamasani County
- Bar Aftab-e Zirdu, a village in Rostam County

== Hormozgan province ==
- Bar Aftab, Hormozgan, a village in Hajjiabad County

== Ilam province ==
- Baraftab-e Bi, a village in Shirvan and Chardaval County
- Baraftab-e Chalab Zard, a village in Shirvan and Chardaval County
- Baraftab-e Larini, a village in Shirvan and Chardaval County
- Baraftab-e Meleh Maran, a village in Shirvan and Chardaval County

== Kermanshah province ==
- Bar Aftab, Kermanshah
- Baraftab, Gilan-e Gharb, a village in Gilan-e Gharb County
- Bar Aftab-e Golin, a village in Sarpol-e Zahrab County

== Khuzestan province ==
=== Andika County ===
- Bar Aftab-e Akbar, a village in Andika County
- Bar Aftab-e Chel Khorasan, a village in Andika County
- Bar Aftab-e Heydarqoli, a village in Andika County

=== Bagh-e Malek County ===
- Bar Aftab, Bagh-e Malek, a village in Bagh-e Malek County

=== Dezful County ===
- Bar Aftab-e Olya, a village in Dezful County
- Bar Aftab-e Sofla, Khuzestan, a village in Dezful County

=== Izeh County ===
- Bar Aftab, Izeh, a village in Izeh County
- Bar Aftab-e Fazl, a village in Izeh County
- Bar Aftab-e Ali Momen, a village in Izeh County
- Bar Aftab-e Amanallah, a village in Izeh County
- Bar Aftab-e Chah Dowpowk, a village in Izeh County
- Bar Aftab-e Kashkeli, a village in Izeh County
- Bar Aftab-e Rezai, a village in Izeh County
- Bar Aftab-e Sadat, a village in Izeh County
- Bar Aftab-e Zafari, a village in Izeh County

=== Lali County ===
- Bar Aftab-e Sipeh, a village in Lali County

== Kohgiluyeh and Boyer-Ahmad province ==
- Baraftab-e Poshtkuh, a village in Basht County
- Bar Aftab-e Silab, a village in Boyer-Ahmad County
- Bar Aftab-e Tahlivan, a village in Boyer-Ahmad County
- Deh-e Bar Aftab (disambiguation), a village in Boyer-Ahmad County
- Bar Aftab-e Kochala, a village in Charam County
- Bar Aftab-e Sarfaryab, a village in Charam County
- Bar Aftab-e Ali Karami, a village in Dana County
- Bar Aftab-e Jalaleh, a village in Dana County
- Bar Aftab-e Khorbel, a village in Gachsaran County
- Bar Aftab, Kohgiluyeh, a village in Kohgiluyeh County
- Bar Aftab-e Emam Reza, a village in Kohgiluyeh County
- Bar Aftab-e Sefid, a village in Kohgiluyeh County
- Bar Aftab-e Sofla, Kohgiluyeh and Boyer-Ahmad, a village in Kohgiluyeh County

== Lorestan province ==
- Bar Aftab, Dorud, a village in Dorud County
- Bar Aftab-e Deraz, a village in Dorud County
- Kheyrabad-e Olya, Lorestan, a village in Dowreh County
- Qasemali-ye Bar Aftab, a village in Dowreh County
- Bar Aftab-e Humeh, a village in Khorramabad County
- Bar Aftab-e Ali Asgar, a village in Khorramabad County
- Baraftab-e Seyd Mohammad, a village in Kuhdasht County
- Baraftab, Pol-e Dokhtar, a village in Pol-e Dokhtar County
- Bar Aftab-e Ghazal, a village in Pol-e Dokhtar County
