= Posht Asiab =

Neighborhood in Khuzestan province, Iran

Posht Asiab Persian: پشت اسياب
- Neighborhood
- Location within Iran
- Coordinates: 31°37′16″N 50°12′08″E
- Country: Iran
- Province: Khuzestan
- County: Dezpart
- District: Qarun
- Rural District: Shivand
- Village: Nowshivand

Population (2016)
  - Total: 384
- Time zone: UTC+3:30 (IRST)

Posht Asiab (Persian: پشت اسياب) (Note: Also romanized as Posht Āsīāb; also known as Deh Posht Āsyāb-e Sheyvand, Deh-e Hasht Āsīāb-e Shapvand, and Deh-e Posht Āsīāb-e Shīvand) is a neighborhood in the village of Nowshivand, Shivand Rural District, Qarun District, Dezpart County, Khuzestan province, Iran.

== Demographics ==
=== Population ===
At the time of the 2006 National Census, Posht Asiab's population was 511 in 99 households, when it was a village in Donbaleh Rud-e Shomali Rural District (Note: Formerly Donbaleh Rural District) of Dehdez District, (Note: Renamed the Central District of Dezpart County) Izeh County. The following census in 2011 counted 568 people in 122 households. The 2016 census measured the population of the village as 384 people in 85 households.

In 2021, the district was separated from the county in the establishment of Dezpart County and renamed the Central District. Donbaleh Rud-e Jonubi Rural District was separated from the district in the formation of Qarun District, and the village was transferred to Shivand Rural District created in the new district. Posht Asiab and the village of Bozorg Shivand merged with the village of Nowshivand.
