= Bozorg Shivand =

Neighborhood in Khuzestan province, Iran

Bozorg Shivand Persian: بزرگ شيوند
- Neighborhood
- Location within Iran
- Coordinates: 31°37′38″N 50°12′33″E
- Country: Iran
- Province: Khuzestan
- County: Dezpart
- District: Qarun
- Rural District: Shivand
- Village: Nowshivand

Population (2016)
  - Total: 231
- Time zone: UTC+3:30 (IRST)

Bozorg Shivand (Persian: بزرگ شيوند) (Note: Also romanized as Bozorg Shīvand) is a neighborhood in the village of Nowshivand, Shivand Rural District, Qarun District, Dezpart County, Khuzestan province, Iran. It was the capital of Donbaleh Rural District (Note: Renamed Donbaleh Rud-e Shomali Rural District) until its capital was transferred to the village of Bajul, after which it was transferred again to the village of Deh Kian.

== Demographics ==
=== Population ===
At the time of the 2006 National Census, Bozorg Shivand's population was 327 in 65 households, when it was a village in Donbaleh Rud-e Shomali Rural District of Dehdez District, (Note: Renamed the Central District of Dezpart County) Izeh County. The following census in 2011 counted 330 people in 77 households. The 2016 census measured the population of the village as 231 people in 58 households.

In 2021, the district was separated from the county in the establishment of Dezpart County and renamed the Central District. Donbaleh Rud-e Jonubi Rural District was separated from the district in the formation of Qarun District, and the village was transferred to Shivand Rural District created in the new district. Bozorg Shivand and the village of Posht Asiab merged with the village of Nowshivand.
