= Abrak =

Abrak (Persian: اب راك) may refer to one of three villages in Howmeh-ye Sharqi Rural District, in the Central District of Izeh County, Khuzestan Province, Iran:

- Abrak-e Azhgil (آبراک اژگیل), population 936 as of the 2006 census
- Abrak-e Do (آبراک دو), population 225 as of the 2006 census
- Abrak-e Yek (آبراک یک), population 144 as of the 2006 census
