= Deh Now-ye Kizavak =

Neighborhood in Khuzestan province, Iran

Deh Now-ye Kizavak Persian: دهنوكيزوك
- Neighborhood
- Location within Iran
- Coordinates: 31°33′46″N 50°17′51″E
- Country: Iran
- Province: Khuzestan
- County: Dezpart
- District: Qarun
- Rural District: Donbaleh Rud-e Jonubi
- Village: Mallah

Population (2016)
  - Total: 396
- Time zone: UTC+3:30 (IRST)

Deh Now-ye Kizavak (Persian: دهنوكيزوك) (Note: Also romanized as Deh Now-ye Kīzavak) is a neighborhood in the village of Mallah, Donbaleh Rud-e Jonubi Rural District of Qarun District, Dezpart County, Khuzestan province, Iran. As a village, it was the capital of the rural district until its capital was transferred to the village of Bar Aftab-e Fazl.

== Demographics ==
=== Population ===
At the time of the 2006 National Census, Deh Now-ye Kizavak's population was 387 in 75 households, when it was a village in Dehdez District (Note: Renamed the Central District of Dezpart County) of Izeh County. The following census in 2011 counted 335 people in 80 households. The 2016 census measured the population of the village as 396 people in 102 households.

In 2021, the district was separated from the county in the establishment of Dezpart County and renamed the Central District. The rural district was separated from the district in the formation of Qarun District, and Deh Now-ye Kizavak merged with the village of Mallah.
