= Sarrak =

Sarrak (Persian: سررك) may refer to:

- Sarrak, Iran
- Sarrak, alternate name of Chiveh
- Sarrak, alternate name of Sarrag
- Sarrak-e Khvajavi
- Sarrak-e Olya
- Sarrak-e Sofla

== See also ==
- Sarak (disambiguation)
