= Deh Kian =

Village in Khuzestan province, Iran

Deh Kian Persian: ده كيان
- Village
- Location within Iran
- Coordinates: 31°43′36″N 50°14′22″E
- Country: Iran
- Province: Khuzestan
- County: Dezpart
- District: Central
- Rural District: Donbaleh Rud-e Shomali

Population (2016)
  - Total: 660
- Time zone: UTC+3:30 (IRST)

Deh Kian (Persian: ده كيان) (Note: Also romanized as Deh Kīān; also known as Kīān and Kīyān) is a village in, and the capital of, Donbaleh Rud-e Shomali Rural District (Note: Formerly Donbaleh Rural District) of the Central District (Note: Formerly Dehdez District of Izeh County) of Dezpart County, Khuzestan province, Iran. The previous capital of the rural district was the village of Bajul, and prior to that, the village of Bozorg Shivand.

== Demographics ==
=== Population ===
At the time of the 2006 National Census, the village's population was 784 in 132 households, when it was in Dehdez Rural District of Dehdez District, (Note: Renamed the Central District of Dezpart County) Izeh County. The following census in 2011 counted 788 people in 180 households. The 2016 census measured the population of the village as 660 people in 168 households.

In 2021, the district was separated from the county in the establishment of Dezpart County and renamed the Central District. Deh Kian was transferred to Donbaleh Rud-e Shomali Rural District.
