= Tanbaku Kar =

Tanbaku Kar (Persian: تنباكوكار) may refer to:

- Tanbaku Kar, Lali
- Tanbaku Kar-e Ali
- Tanbaku Kar-e Ebrahim
- Tanbaku Kar-e Pain
