= Nowshivand =

Village in Khuzestan province, Iran

Nowshivand Persian: نوشيوند
- Village
- Location within Iran
- Coordinates: 31°37′24″N 50°12′34″E
- Country: Iran
- Province: Khuzestan
- County: Dezpart
- District: Qarun
- Rural District: Shivand

Population (2016)
  - Total: 277
- Time zone: UTC+3:30 (IRST)

Nowshivand (Persian: نوشيوند) (Note: Also romanized as Nowshīvand) is a village in, and the capital of, Shivand Rural District of Qarun District, Dezpart County, Khuzestan province, Iran.

== Demographics ==
=== Population ===
At the time of the 2006 National Census, the village's population was 289 in 55 households, when it was in Donbaleh Rud-e Shomali Rural District (Note: Formerly Donbaleh Rural District) of Dehdez District, (Note: Renamed the Central District of Dezpart County) Izeh County. The following census in 2011 counted 334 people in 66 households. The 2016 census measured the population of the village as 277 people in 65 households.

In 2021, the district was separated from the county in the establishment of Dezpart County and renamed the Central District. The rural district was separated from the district in the formation of Qarun District. The villages of Bozorg Shivand and Posht Asiab merged with Nowshivand, which was transferred to the Shivand Rural District created in the new district.
