= Darbeh-ye Gharibi =

Darbeh-ye Gharibi دربه غريبي
- Village
- Location within Iran
- Coordinates: 31°36′17″N 50°16′04″E
- Country: Iran
- Province: Khuzestan
- County: Izeh
- Bakhsh: Dehdez
- Rural District: Donbaleh Rud-e Jonubi

Population (2006)
  - Total: 554
- Time zone: UTC+3:30 (IRST)
  - Summer (DST): UTC+4:30 (IRDT)

Darbeh-ye Gharibi (Persian: دربه غريبي, also Romanized as Darbeh-ye Gharībī; also known as Darb-e Gharībī) is a village in Donbaleh Rud-e Jonubi Rural District, Dehdez District, Izeh County, Khuzestan Province, Iran. At the 2006 census, its population was 554, in 103 families.

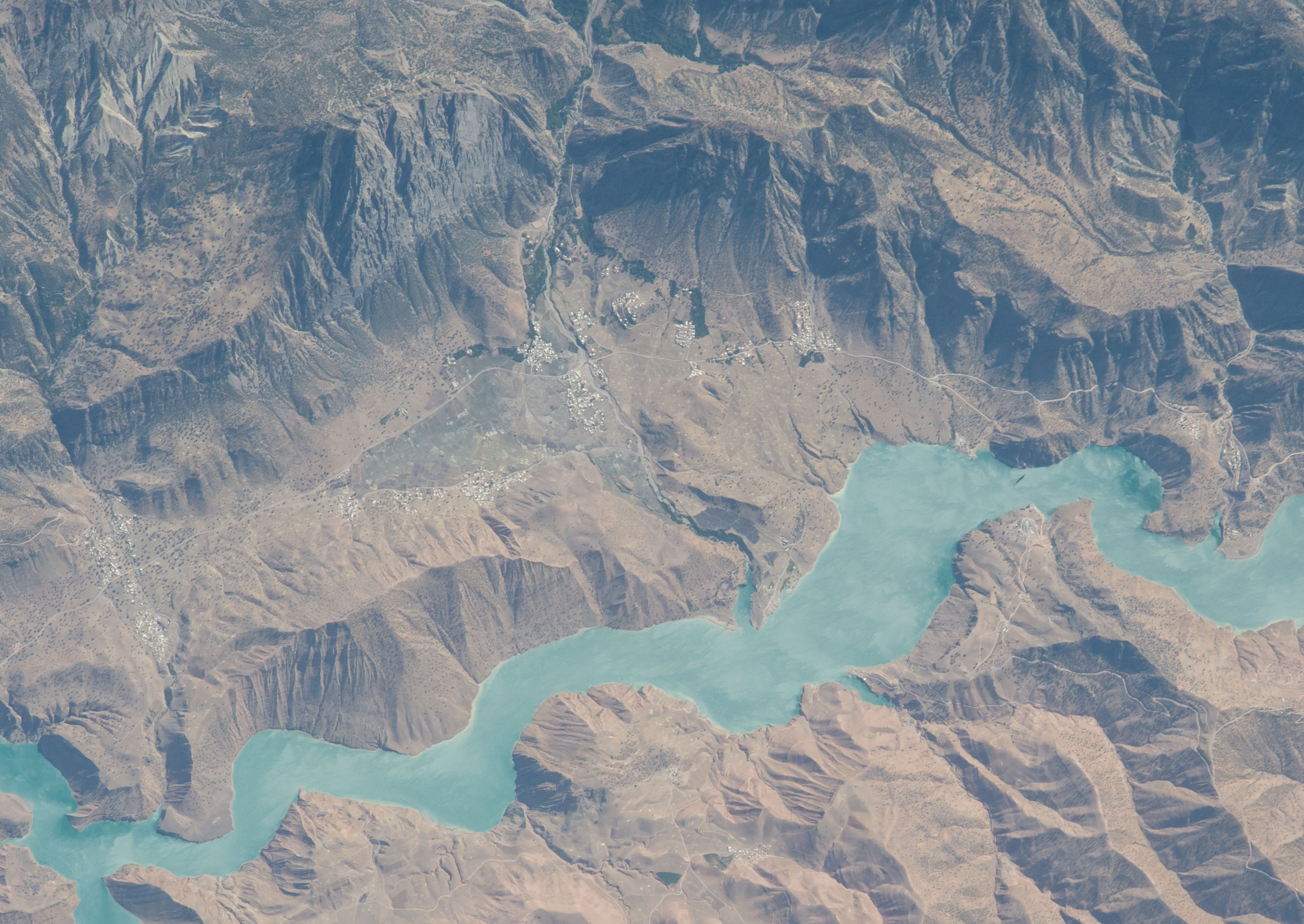
Karun-3 Lake, villages Bar Aftab-e Fazl, Howz Gel and Darbeh-ye Gharibi in Zagros Mountains
