= Sheyvand Waterfall =

Waterfall in Iran

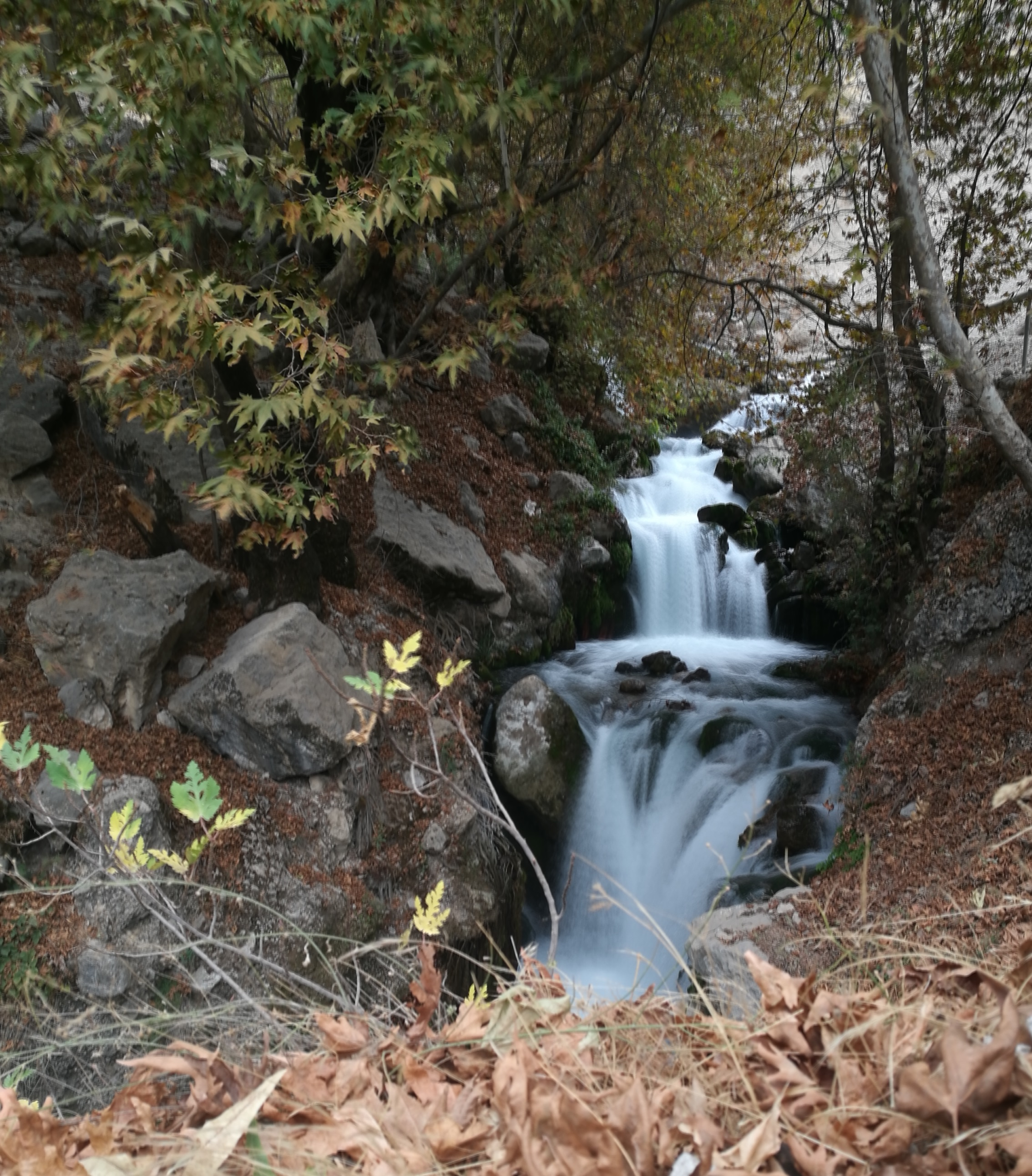
- Sheyvand Waterfall
- Interactive map of Sheyvand Waterfall
- Coordinates: 31°36′33″N 50°11′23″E

Sheyvand Waterfall (Persian: آبشار شیوند, romanized: Abshar-e Sheyvand) is in the Mongasht and Shalu Protected Area near the village of Nowshivand in Shivand Rural District of Qarun District, Dezpart County, Khuzestan province, Iran.

The Karun River borders the village on the east, and the waterfall is located 4 km (2.5 mi) away as it pours into a lake. The area is purported to include a Safavid era inn (Abassi Inn), a tomb, dungeon, and Bardegary inscriptions.
