= Chaman, Khuzestan =

Village in Khuzestan province, Iran

Chaman Persian: چمن
- Village
- Location within Iran
- Coordinates: 31°34′19″N 50°16′42″E
- Country: Iran
- Province: Khuzestan
- County: Dezpart
- District: Qarun
- Rural District: Donbaleh Rud-e Jonubi

Population (2016)
  - Total: 567
- Time zone: UTC+3:30 (IRST)

Chaman (Persian: چمن) is a village in Donbaleh Rud-e Jonubi Rural District of Qarun District, Dezpart County, Khuzestan province, Iran.

== Demographics ==
=== Population ===
At the time of the 2006 National Census, the village's population was 616 in 121 households, when it was in Dehdez District (Note: Renamed the Central District of Dezpart County) of Izeh County. The following census in 2011 counted 635 people in 147 households. The 2016 census measured the population of the village as 567 people in 146 households. It was the most populous village in its rural district.

In 2021, the district was separated from the county in the establishment of Dezpart County and renamed the Central District. The rural district was separated from the district in the formation of Qarun District.
