= Laderaz =

Laderaz لادراز
- Village
- Location within Iran
- Coordinates: 32°03′16″N 49°44′24″E
- Country: Iran
- Province: Khuzestan
- County: Izeh
- Bakhsh: Central
- Rural District: Pian

Population (2006)
  - Total: 58
- Time zone: UTC+3:30 (IRST)
  - Summer (DST): UTC+4:30 (IRDT)

Laderaz (Persian: لادراز, also Romanized as Lāderāz) is a village in Pian Rural District, in the Central District of Izeh County, Khuzestan Province, Iran. At the 2006 census, its population was 58, in 11 families.
