= Bar Aftab-e Sofla =

Bar Aftab-e Sofla (Persian: برافتاب سفلي) or Bar Aftab-e Pain (Persian: برافتاب پائین), both meaning "Lower Bar Aftab", may refer to:

- Bar Aftab-e Sofla, Khuzestan
- Bar Aftab-e Sofla, Kohgiluyeh and Boyer-Ahmad
- Bar Aftab-e Sofla, Charusa, Kohgiluyeh and Boyer-Ahmad Province
