= Ab Gonjeshki =

Ab Gonjeshki اب گنجشكي
- Village
- Location within Iran
- Coordinates: 31°41′42″N 50°09′23″E
- Country: Iran
- Province: Khuzestan
- County: Izeh
- Bakhsh: Dehdez
- Rural District: Donbaleh Rud-e Shomali

Population (2006)
  - Total: 37
- Time zone: UTC+3:30 (IRST)
  - Summer (DST): UTC+4:30 (IRDT)

Ab Gonjeshki (Persian: اب گنجشكي, also Romanized as Āb Gonjeshkī; also known as Āb Gonjeshgān and Āb Gonjeshkān) is a village in Donbaleh Rud-e Shomali Rural District, Dehdez District, Izeh County, Khuzestan Province, Iran. At the 2006 census, its population was 37, in 6 families.
