= Sheykh Madi =

Sheykh Madi شیخ مادی
- Village
- Location within Iran
- Coordinates: 31°40′51″N 50°13′27″E
- Country: Iran
- Province: Khuzestan
- County: Izeh
- Bakhsh: Dehdez
- Rural District: Dehdez

Population (2006)
  - Total: 458
- Time zone: UTC+3:30 (IRST)
  - Summer (DST): UTC+4:30 (IRDT)

Sheykh Madi (Persian: شیخ مادی, also Romanized as Sheykh Mādī; also known as Sheykh Mehdī) is a village in Dehdez Rural District, Dehdez District, Izeh County, Khuzestan Province, Iran. At the 2006 census, its population was 458, in 86 families.
