= Sarak (disambiguation) =

Sarak may refer to:

- Sarak, an Indian caste
- Sərək, Azerbaijan
- Sarak, Alborz, Iran
- Sarak, Gilan, Iran
- Sarak, Izeh, Khuzestan Province, Iran
- Sarak, Lali, Khuzestan Province, Iran

== See also ==
- Sarrak (disambiguation)
- Sadak (disambiguation)
