= Bajul =

Village in Khuzestan province, Iran

Bajuol Persian: باجول
- Village
- Location within Iran
- Coordinates: 31°44′25″N 50°07′47″E
- Country: Iran
- Province: Khuzestan
- County: Dezpart
- District: Central
- Rural District: Donbaleh Rud-e Shomali

Population (2016)
  - Total: 75
- Time zone: UTC+3:30 (IRST)

Bajul (Persian: باجول) (Note: Also romanized as Bājūl; also known as Bājūl-e Shālū) is a village in, and the former capital of, Donbaleh Rud-e Shomali Rural District (Note: Formerly Donbaleh Rural District) of the Central District (Note: Formerly Dehdez District of Izeh County) of Dezpart County, Khuzestan province, Iran. The previous capital of the rural district was the village of Bozorg Shivand. The capital has been transferred to the village of Deh Kian.

== Demographics ==
=== Population ===
At the time of the 2006 National Census, the village's population was 107 in 19 households, when it was in Dehdez District (Note: Renamed the Central District of Dezpart County) of Izeh County. The following census in 2011 counted 56 people in 12 households. The 2016 census measured the population of the village as 75 people in 18 households.

In 2021, the district was separated from the county in the establishment of Dezpart County and renamed the Central District.
