= Deh Rakhda =

Deh Rakhda ده راخدا
- Village
- Country: Iran
- Province: Khuzestan
- County: Izeh
- Bakhsh: Dehdez
- Rural District: Dehdez

Population (2006)
  - Total: 34
- Time zone: UTC+3:30 (IRST)
  - Summer (DST): UTC+4:30 (IRDT)

Deh Rakhda (Persian: ده راخدا, also Romanized as Deh Rākhdā) is a village in Dehdez Rural District, Dehdez District, Izeh County, Khuzestan Province, Iran. At the 2006 census, its population was 34, in 6 families.
