= Chelisad =

Chelisad چليساد
- Village
- Location within Iran
- Coordinates: 31°42′49″N 50°14′55″E
- Country: Iran
- Province: Khuzestan
- County: Izeh
- Bakhsh: Dehdez
- Rural District: Dehdez

Population (2006)
  - Total: 348
- Time zone: UTC+3:30 (IRST)
  - Summer (DST): UTC+4:30 (IRDT)

Chelisad (Persian: چليساد, also Romanized as Chelīsād) is a village in Dehdez Rural District, Dehdez District, Izeh County, Khuzestan Province, Iran. At the 2006 census, its population was 348, in 63 families.
