= Shur Barik =

Shur Barik شورباريك
- Village
- Location within Iran
- Coordinates: 31°47′02″N 49°41′47″E
- Country: Iran
- Province: Khuzestan
- County: Izeh
- Bakhsh: Central
- Rural District: Holayjan

Population (2006)
  - Total: 94
- Time zone: UTC+3:30 (IRST)
  - Summer (DST): UTC+4:30 (IRDT)

Shur Barik (Persian: شورباريك, also Romanized as Shūr Bārīk and Shoor Barik) is a village in Holayjan Rural District, in the Central District of Izeh County, Khuzestan Province, Iran. At the 2006 census, its population was 94, in 19 families.
