= Landeh, Khuzestan =

Landeh لنده
- Village
- Location within Iran
- Coordinates: 31°48′49″N 50°16′35″E
- Country: Iran
- Province: Khuzestan
- County: Izeh
- Bakhsh: Dehdez
- Rural District: Dehdez

Population (2006)
  - Total: 326
- Time zone: UTC+3:30 (IRST)
  - Summer (DST): UTC+4:30 (IRDT)

Landeh (Persian: لنده, also Romanized as Lendeh) is a village in Dehdez Rural District, Dehdez District, Izeh County, Khuzestan Province, Iran. At the 2006 census, its population was 326, in 48 families.
