= Deh Kohneh-ye Muzarm =

Village in Khuzestan province, Iran

Deh Kohneh-ye Muzarm Persian: ده كهنه موزرم
- Village
- Location within Iran
- Coordinates: 31°38′53″N 50°20′09″E
- Country: Iran
- Province: Khuzestan
- County: Dezpart
- District: Central
- Rural District: Dehdez

Population (2016)
  - Total: 1,181
- Time zone: UTC+3:30 (IRST)

Deh Kohneh-ye Moozarm (Persian: ده كهنه موزرم) (Note: Also romanized as Deh Kohneh-ye Moozarm; also known as Moozarm and Moozarn) is a village in, and the capital of, Dehdez Rural District of the Central District (Note: Formerly Dehdez District of Izeh County) of Dezpart County, Khuzestan province, Iran. The rural district was previously administered from the city of Dehdez.

== Demographics ==
=== Population ===
At the time of the 2006 National Census, the village's population was 1,205 in 251 households, when it was in Dehdez District (Note: Renamed the Central District of Dezpart County) of Izeh County. The following census in 2011 counted 1,212 people in 286 households. The 2016 census measured the population of the village as 1,181 people in 309 households. It was the most populous village in its rural district.

In 2021, the district was separated from the county in the establishment of Dezpart County and renamed the Central District.
