= Seyyed Nazar =

Seyyed Nazar سيدنظر
- Village
- Location within Iran
- Coordinates: 31°56′08″N 49°35′52″E
- Country: Iran
- Province: Khuzestan
- County: Izeh
- Bakhsh: Central
- Rural District: Margha

Population (2006)
  - Total: 18
- Time zone: UTC+3:30 (IRST)
  - Summer (DST): UTC+4:30 (IRDT)

Seyyed Nazar (Persian: سيدنظر, also Romanized as Seyyed Naz̧ar; also known as Seyyed Nāşer) is a village in Margha Rural District, in the Central District of Izeh County, Khuzestan Province, Iran. At the 2006 census, its population was 18, in 4 families.
