= Kahshur =

Kahshur (Persian: كهشور) may refer to:

- Kahshur-e Ali Nazer
- Kahshur-e Davud Ali
- Kahshur-e Olya
