= Kahrla =

Kohrela كهرلا
- Village
- Location within Iran
- Coordinates: 31°40′50″N 50°10′59″E
- Country: Iran
- Province: Khuzestan
- County: Izeh
- Bakhsh: Dehdez
- Rural District: Dehdez

Population (2006)
  - Total: 392
- Time zone: UTC+3:30 (IRST)
  - Summer (DST): UTC+4:30 (IRDT)

Kohrela (Persian: كهرلا, also Romanized as Kohrelā) is a village in Dehdez Rural District, Dehdez District, Izeh County, Khuzestan Province, Iran. At the 2006 census, its population was 592, in 134 families. This village is located near a Karoon river. Its people are famous for being brave and generous.
