= Ableh =

Ableh or Abeleh (Persian: ابله) may refer to:

- Ableh-ye Olya, Khuzestan Province
- Ableh-ye Sofla, Khuzestan Province
- Ableh, Kohgiluyeh and Boyer-Ahmad
