= Dasht Mal =

Dasht Mal دشتمال
- Village
- Location within Iran
- Coordinates: 32°13′03″N 49°43′35″E
- Country: Iran
- Province: Khuzestan
- County: Izeh
- Bakhsh: Central
- Rural District: Pian

Population (2006)
  - Total: 26
- Time zone: UTC+3:30 (IRST)
  - Summer (DST): UTC+4:30 (IRDT)

Dasht Mal (Persian: دشتمال, also Romanized as Dasht Māl) is a village in Pian Rural District, in the Central District of Izeh County, Khuzestan Province, Iran. At the 2006 census, its population was 26, in 4 families.
