= Kal-e Chunek =

Kal-e Chunek كلچونك
- Village
- Location within Iran
- Coordinates: 31°38′18″N 50°21′27″E
- Country: Iran
- Province: Khuzestan
- County: Izeh
- Bakhsh: Dehdez
- Rural District: Dehdez

Population (2006)
  - Total: 26
- Time zone: UTC+3:30 (IRST)
  - Summer (DST): UTC+4:30 (IRDT)

Kal-e Chunek (Persian: كلچونك, also Romanized as Kal-e Chūnek; also known as Kalchūnek) is a village in Dehdez Rural District, Dehdez District, Izeh County, Khuzestan Province, Iran. At the 2006 census, its population was 26, in 6 families.
