= Deh Balai =

Deh Balai ده بالايي
- Village
- Location within Iran
- Coordinates: 31°53′55″N 50°06′26″E
- Country: Iran
- Province: Khuzestan
- County: Izeh
- Bakhsh: Dehdez
- Rural District: Donbaleh Rud-e Shomali

Population (2006)
  - Total: 66
- Time zone: UTC+3:30 (IRST)
  - Summer (DST): UTC+4:30 (IRDT)

Deh Balai (Persian: ده بالايي, also Romanized as Deh Bālā’ī) is a village in Donbaleh Rud-e Shomali Rural District, Dehdez District, Izeh County, Khuzestan Province, Iran. At the 2006 census, its population was 66, in 10 families.
