= Mallah, Iran =

Village in Khuzestan province, Iran

Mallah Persian: ملاح
- Village
- Location within Iran
- Coordinates: 31°33′41″N 50°17′47″E
- Country: Iran
- Province: Khuzestan
- County: Dezpart
- District: Qarun
- Rural District: Donbaleh Rud-e Jonubi

Population (2016)
  - Total: 500
- Time zone: UTC+3:30 (IRST)

Mallah (Persian: ملاح) (Note: Also romanized as Mallāḩ) is a village in Donbaleh Rud-e Jonubi Rural District of Qarun District, Dezpart County, Khuzestan province, Iran, serving as capital of the district.

== Demographics ==
=== Population ===
At the time of the 2006 National Census, the village's population was 560 in 112 households, when it was in Dehdez District (Note: Renamed the Central District of Dezpart County) of Izeh County. The following census in 2011 counted 524 people in 120 households. The 2016 census measured the population of the village as 500 people in 123 households.

In 2021, the district was separated from the county in the establishment of Dezpart County and renamed the Central District. The rural district was separated from the district in the formation of Qarun District, and Mallah absorbed the village of Deh Now-ye Kizavak.
