= Cham Arab =

Cham Arab چم عرب
- Village
- Location within Iran
- Coordinates: 31°46′28″N 49°43′38″E
- Country: Iran
- Province: Khuzestan
- County: Izeh
- Bakhsh: Central
- Rural District: Holayjan

Population (2006)
  - Total: 24
- Time zone: UTC+3:30 (IRST)
  - Summer (DST): UTC+4:30 (IRDT)

Cham Arab (Persian: چم عرب, also Romanized as Cham ‘Arab; also known as Cham ‘Arab-e Āsh‘abān) is a village in Holayjan Rural District, in the Central District of Izeh County, Khuzestan Province, Iran. At the 2006 census, its population was 24, in 6 families.
