= Konfeh =

Konfeh كنفه
- Village
- Location within Iran
- Coordinates: 31°58′43″N 49°43′50″E
- Country: Iran
- Province: Khuzestan
- County: Izeh
- Bakhsh: Central
- Rural District: Pian

Population (2006)
  - Total: 41
- Time zone: UTC+3:30 (IRST)
  - Summer (DST): UTC+4:30 (IRDT)

Konfeh (Persian: كنفه; also known as Konfeh-ye Ḩājjīābād) is a village in Pian Rural District, in the Central District of Izeh County, Khuzestan Province, Iran. At the 2006 census, its population was 41, in 7 families.
