= Qaleh-ye Kazhdamak =

Qaleh-ye Kazhdamak قلعه كژدمك
- Village
- Location within Iran
- Coordinates: 31°54′57″N 49°52′18″E
- Country: Iran
- Province: Khuzestan
- County: Izeh
- Bakhsh: Central
- Rural District: Howmeh-ye Sharqi

Population (2006)
  - Total: 276
- Time zone: UTC+3:30 (IRST)
  - Summer (DST): UTC+4:30 (IRDT)

Qaleh-ye Kazhdamak (Persian: قلعه كژدمك, also Romanized as Qal‘eh-ye Kazhdamak; also known as Qal‘eh Gazhdam) is a village in Howmeh-ye Sharqi Rural District, in the Central District of Izeh County, Khuzestan Province, Iran. At the 2006 census, its population was 276, in 46 families.
