= Chahar Tang =

Chahar Tang or Chehar Tang (Persian: چهارتنگ) may refer to:

- Chahar Tang-e Olya, Khuzestan Province
- Chahar Tang-e Sofla, Khuzestan Province
- Chahar Tang, Kohgiluyeh and Boyer-Ahmad
