= Posht-e Pian =

Village in Khuzestan province, Iran

Posht-e Pian Persian: پشت پيان
- Village
- Location within Iran
- Coordinates: 31°57′56″N 49°46′35″E
- Country: Iran
- Province: Khuzestan
- County: Izeh
- District: Central
- Rural District: Pian

Population (2016)
  - Total: 2,325
- Time zone: UTC+3:30 (IRST)

Posht-e Pian (Persian: پشت پيان) (Note: Also romanized as Posht-e Pīān; also known as Posht Peyūn and Posht Peyvan) is a village in, and the capital of, Pian Rural District of the Central District of Izeh County, Khuzestan province, Iran.

== Demographics ==
=== Population ===
At the time of the 2006 National Census, the village's population was 2,372 in 458 households. The following census in 2011 counted 2,488 people in 541 households. The 2016 census measured the population of the village as 2,325 people in 563 households. It was the most populous village in its rural district.
