= Bar Aftab-e Sadat =

Bar Aftab-e Sadat برافتاب سادات
- Village
- Location within Iran
- Coordinates: 31°43′11″N 50°04′04″E
- Country: Iran
- Province: Khuzestan
- County: Izeh
- Bakhsh: Dehdez
- Rural District: Donbaleh Rud-e Shomali

Population (2006)
  - Total: 306
- Time zone: UTC+3:30 (IRST)
  - Summer (DST): UTC+4:30 (IRDT)

Bar Aftab-e Sadat (Persian: برافتاب سادات, also Romanized as Bar Āftāb-e Sādāt) is a village in Donbaleh Rud-e Shomali Rural District, Dehdez District, Izeh County, Khuzestan Province, Iran. At the 2006 census, its population was 306, in 54 families.
