= Sarrak-e Sofla =

Sarrak-e Sofla سراك سفلي
- Village
- Location within Iran
- Coordinates: 31°52′30″N 49°58′42″E
- Country: Iran
- Province: Khuzestan
- County: Izeh
- Bakhsh: Central
- Rural District: Howmeh-ye Sharqi

Population (2006)
  - Total: 808
- Time zone: UTC+3:30 (IRST)
  - Summer (DST): UTC+4:30 (IRDT)

Sarrak-e Sofla (Persian: سراك سفلي, also Romanized as Sarrāk-e Soflá; also known as Sarrāk-e Pā‘īn) is a village in Howmeh-ye Sharqi Rural District, in the Central District of Izeh County, Khuzestan Province, Iran. At the 2006 census, its population was 808, in 136 families.
