= Didargah =

Didargah (Persian: ديدارگاه) may refer to:

- Didargah-e Olya
- Didargah-e Sofla
