= Gowd Gach-e Sofla =

Gowd Gach-e Sofla گودگچ سفلي
- Village
- Country: Iran
- Province: Khuzestan
- County: Izeh
- Bakhsh: Central
- Rural District: Holayjan

Population (2006)
  - Total: 176
- Time zone: UTC+3:30 (IRST)
  - Summer (DST): UTC+4:30 (IRDT)

Gowd Gach-e Sofla (Persian: گودگچ سفلي, also Romanized as Gowd Gach-e Soflá) is a village in Holayjan Rural District, in the Central District of Izeh County, Khuzestan Province, Iran. At the 2006 census, its population was 176, in 27 families.
