= Ableh-ye Olya =

Ableh-ye Olya ابله عليا
- Village
- Location within Iran
- Coordinates: 31°50′28″N 49°43′58″E
- Country: Iran
- Province: Khuzestan
- County: Izeh
- Bakhsh: Central
- Rural District: Holayjan

Population (2006)
  - Total: 50
- Time zone: UTC+3:30 (IRST)
  - Summer (DST): UTC+4:30 (IRDT)

Ableh-ye Olya (Persian: ابله عليا, also Romanized as Ābleh-ye ‘Olyā; also known as Ābleh-ye Bālā) is a village in Holayjan Rural District, in the Central District of Izeh County, Khuzestan Province, Iran. At the 2006 census, its population was 50, in 9 families.
