= Malsaidi =

Malsaidi (Persian: مال سيدي) may refer to:

- Malsaidi-ye Olya
- Malsaidi-ye Sofla
