= Ketf-e Gusheh =

Ketf-e Gusheh كفت گوشه
- Village
- Location within Iran
- Coordinates: 31°39′38″N 50°11′00″E
- Country: Iran
- Province: Khuzestan
- County: Izeh
- Bakhsh: Dehdez
- Rural District: Donbaleh Rud-e Shomali

Population (2006)
  - Total: 157
- Time zone: UTC+3:30 (IRST)
  - Summer (DST): UTC+4:30 (IRDT)

Ketf-e Gusheh (Persian: كفت گوشه, also Romanized as Ketf-e Gūsheh) is a village in Donbaleh Rud-e Shomali Rural District, Dehdez District, Izeh County, Khuzestan Province, Iran. At the 2006 census, its population was 157, in 34 families.
