= Bar Aftab-e Kashkeli =

Bar Aftab-e Kashkeli برافتاب كاشكلي
- Village
- Location within Iran
- Coordinates: 32°01′51″N 49°46′17″E
- Country: Iran
- Province: Khuzestan
- County: Izeh
- Bakhsh: Central
- Rural District: Pian

Population (2006)
  - Total: 873
- Time zone: UTC+3:30 (IRST)
  - Summer (DST): UTC+4:30 (IRDT)

Bar Aftab-e Kashkeli (Persian: برافتاب كاشكلي, also Romanized as Bar Āftāb-e Kāshkelī; also known as Bar Āftāb-e Kāshgelī, Kūshkelī, and Shahrak-e Kāshgelī) is a village in Pian Rural District, in the Central District of Izeh County, Khuzestan Province, Iran. At the 2006 census, its population was 873, in 158 families.
