= Kahshur-e Davud Ali =

Village in Khuzestan Province, Iran

Kahshur-e Davud Ali كهشورداودعلي
- Village
- Country: Iran
- Province: Khuzestan
- County: Izeh
- Bakhsh: Central
- Rural District: Howmeh-ye Sharqi

Population (2006)
  - Total: 29
- Time zone: UTC+3:30 (IRST)
  - Summer (DST): UTC+4:30 (IRDT)

Kahshur-e Davud Ali (Persian: كهشورداودعلي, also romanized as Kahshūr-e Dāvūd ʿAlī) is a village in Howmeh-ye Sharqi Rural District, in the Central District of Izeh County, Khuzestan Province, Iran. At the 2006 census, its population was 29, in 8 families.
