= Ketf-e Zeytun =

Ketf-e Zeytun كفت زيتون
- Village
- Location within Iran
- Coordinates: 31°40′12″N 50°10′10″E
- Country: Iran
- Province: Khuzestan
- County: Izeh
- Bakhsh: Dehdez
- Rural District: Donbaleh Rud-e Shomali

Population (2006)
  - Total: 43
- Time zone: UTC+3:30 (IRST)
  - Summer (DST): UTC+4:30 (IRDT)

Ketf-e Zeytun (Persian: كفت زيتون, also Romanized as Ketf-e Zeytūn) is a village in Donbaleh Rud-e Shomali Rural District, Dehdez District, Izeh County, Khuzestan Province, Iran. At the 2006 census, its population was 43, in 9 families.
