= Cham Reyhan =

Village in Khuzestan province, Iran

Cham Reyhan Persian: چم ريحان
- Village
- Location within Iran
- Coordinates: 31°56′47″N 49°35′44″E
- Country: Iran
- Province: Khuzestan
- County: Izeh
- District: Central
- Rural District: Margha

Population (2016)
  - Total: 93
- Time zone: UTC+3:30 (IRST)

Cham Reyhan (Persian: چم ريحان) (Note: Also romanized as Cham Reihan, Cham Reyḩān, and Cham-e Reyḩān) is a village in, and the capital of, Margha Rural District of the Central District of Izeh County, Khuzestan province, Iran.

== Demographics ==
=== Population ===
At the time of the 2006 National Census, the village's population was 87 in 22 households. The following census in 2011 counted 78 people in 17 households. The 2016 census measured the population of the village as 93 people in 30 households.
