= Gowd Gach-e Olya =

Gowd Gach-e Olya گودگچ عليا
- Village
- Location within Iran
- Coordinates: 31°42′53″N 49°52′32″E
- Country: Iran
- Province: Khuzestan
- County: Izeh
- Bakhsh: Central
- Rural District: Holayjan

Population (2006)
  - Total: 250
- Time zone: UTC+3:30 (IRST)
  - Summer (DST): UTC+4:30 (IRDT)

Gowd Gach-e Olya (Persian: گودگچ عليا, also Romanized as Gowd Gach-e ‘Olyā; also known as Gowd Gach-e Ālīā, Nāshelīl-e 2, and Nāshelīl-e Do) is a village in Holayjan Rural District, in the Central District of Izeh County, Khuzestan Province, Iran. At the 2006 census, its population was 250, in 46 families.
