= Varzard-e Olya =

Varzard-e Olya ورزردعليا
- Village
- Location within Iran
- Coordinates: 31°55′00″N 49°41′03″E
- Country: Iran
- Province: Khuzestan
- County: Izeh
- Bakhsh: Central
- Rural District: Margha

Population (2006)
  - Total: 83
- Time zone: UTC+3:30 (IRST)
  - Summer (DST): UTC+4:30 (IRDT)

Varzard-e Olya (Persian: ورزردعليا, also Romanized as Varzard-e ‘Olyā; also known as Varzard-e Bālā) is a village in Margha Rural District, in the Central District of Izeh County, Khuzestan Province, Iran. At the 2006 census, its population was 83, in 19 families.
