= Didargah-e Olya =

Didargah-e Olya ديدارگاه عليا
- Village
- Location within Iran
- Coordinates: 31°56′37″N 49°35′12″E
- Country: Iran
- Province: Khuzestan
- County: Izeh
- Bakhsh: Central
- Rural District: Margha

Population (2006)
  - Total: 36
- Time zone: UTC+3:30 (IRST)
  - Summer (DST): UTC+4:30 (IRDT)

Didargah-e Olya (Persian: ديدارگاه عليا, also Romanized as Dīdārgāh-e ‘Olyā; also known as Dīdārgāh-e Bālā) is a village in Margha Rural District, in the Central District of Izeh County, Khuzestan Province, Iran. At the 2006 census, its population was 36, in 7 families.
