= Bar Aftab-e Bozorg =

Bar Aftab-e Bozorg (Persian: برافتاب بزرگ) may refer to:

- Bar Aftab-e Fazl
- Bar Aftab-e Rezai
