= Kal Duzakh-e Do =

Kal Duzakh-e Do كل دوزخ دو
- Village
- Location within Iran
- Coordinates: 31°49′03″N 49°53′48″E
- Country: Iran
- Province: Khuzestan
- County: Izeh
- Bakhsh: Central
- Rural District: Howmeh-ye Sharqi

Population (2006)
  - Total: 1,152
- Time zone: UTC+3:30 (IRST)
  - Summer (DST): UTC+4:30 (IRDT)

Kal Duzakh-e Do (Persian: كل دوزخ دو, also Romanized as Kal Dūzakh-e Do; also known as Kaldūzakh-e Do) is a village in Howmeh-ye Sharqi Rural District, in the Central District of Izeh County, Khuzestan Province, Iran. At the 2006 census, its population was 1,152, in 213 families.
