= Rakat-e Olya =

Rakat-e Olya ركعت عليا
- Village
- Location within Iran
- Coordinates: 31°45′22″N 50°09′13″E
- Country: Iran
- Province: Khuzestan
- County: Izeh
- Bakhsh: Dehdez
- Rural District: Donbaleh Rud-e Shomali

Population (2006)
  - Total: 100
- Time zone: UTC+3:30 (IRST)
  - Summer (DST): UTC+4:30 (IRDT)

Rakat-e Olya (Persian: ركعت عليا, also Romanized as Rak‘at-e ‘Olyā) is a village in Donbaleh Rud-e Shomali Rural District, Dehdez District, Izeh County, Khuzestan Province, Iran. At the 2006 census, its population was 100, in 21 families.
