= Bard Gap =

Bard Gap or Bard-e Gap (Persian: بردگپ) may refer to:

- Bard-e Gap, Izeh, Khuzestan Province
- Bard Gep, Khuzestan Province
