= Bard-e Gap, Izeh =

Bard-e Gap بردگپ
- Village
- Location within Iran
- Coordinates: 31°43′58″N 50°12′53″E
- Country: Iran
- Province: Khuzestan
- County: Izeh
- Bakhsh: Dehdez
- Rural District: Dehdez

Population (2006)
  - Total: 62
- Time zone: UTC+3:30 (IRST)
  - Summer (DST): UTC+4:30 (IRDT)

Bard-e Gap (Persian: بردگپ) is a village in Dehdez Rural District, Dehdez District, Izeh County, Khuzestan Province, Iran. At the 2006 census, its population was 62, in 13 families.
