= Kahshur-e Ali Nazer =

Kahshur-e Ali Nazer كهشورعلي نظر
- Village
- Country: Iran
- Province: Khuzestan
- County: Izeh
- Bakhsh: Central
- Rural District: Howmeh-ye Sharqi

Population (2006)
  - Total: 127
- Time zone: UTC+3:30 (IRST)
  - Summer (DST): UTC+4:30 (IRDT)

Kahshur-e Ali Nazer (Persian: كهشورعلي نظر, also Romanized as Kahshūr-e ʿAlī Naẓer) is a village in Howmeh-ye Sharqi Rural District, in the Central District of Izeh County, Khuzestan Province, Iran. At the 2006 census, its population was 127, in 26 families.
