= Kahshur-e Olya =

Kahshur-e Olya كهشورعليا
- Village
- Location within Iran
- Coordinates: 31°46′19″N 49°55′44″E
- Country: Iran
- Province: Khuzestan
- County: Izeh
- Bakhsh: Central
- Rural District: Howmeh-ye Sharqi

Population (2006)
  - Total: 27
- Time zone: UTC+3:30 (IRST)
  - Summer (DST): UTC+4:30 (IRDT)

Kahshur-e Olya (Persian: كهشورعليا, also Romanized as Kahshūr-e ‘Olyā; also known as Kahshūr-e Bālā) is a village in Howmeh-ye Sharqi Rural District, in the Central District of Izeh County, Khuzestan Province, Iran. At the 2006 census, its population was 27, in 7 families.
