= Didargah-e Sofla =

Didargah-e Sofla ديدارگاه سفلي
- Village
- Location within Iran
- Coordinates: 31°56′09″N 49°35′08″E
- Country: Iran
- Province: Khuzestan
- County: Izeh
- Bakhsh: Central
- Rural District: Margha

Population (2006)
  - Total: 30
- Time zone: UTC+3:30 (IRST)
  - Summer (DST): UTC+4:30 (IRDT)

Didargah-e Sofla (Persian: ديدارگاه سفلي, also Romanized as Dīdārgāh-e Soflá; also known as Dīdārgāh-e Pā‘īn) is a village in Margha Rural District, in the Central District of Izeh County, Khuzestan Province, Iran. At the 2006 census, its population was 30, in 6 families.
