= Rakat-e Sofla =

Rakat-e Sofla ركعت سفلي
- Village
- Location within Iran
- Coordinates: 31°45′00″N 50°08′54″E
- Country: Iran
- Province: Khuzestan
- County: Izeh
- Bakhsh: Dehdez
- Rural District: Donbaleh Rud-e Shomali

Population (2006)
  - Total: 37
- Time zone: UTC+3:30 (IRST)
  - Summer (DST): UTC+4:30 (IRDT)

Rakat-e Sofla (Persian: ركعت سفلي, also Romanized as Rak‘at-e Soflá) is a village in Donbaleh Rud-e Shomali Rural District, Dehdez District, Izeh County, Khuzestan Province, Iran. At the 2006 census, its population was 37, in 8 families.
