= Rakat, Iran =

Rakat (Persian: ركعت) may refer to:

- Rakat-e Olya, a village in Iran
- Rakat-e Sofla, a village in Iran
