= Bi Bi Gol Mordeh-ye Sofla =

Bi Bi Gol Mordeh-ye Sofla بی‌بی‌گل‌مرده سفلی
- Village
- Location within Iran
- Coordinates: 31°44′14″N 49°49′37″E
- Country: Iran
- Province: Khuzestan
- County: Izeh
- Bakhsh: Central
- Rural District: Holayjan

Population (2006)
  - Total: 32
- Time zone: UTC+3:30 (IRST)
  - Summer (DST): UTC+4:30 (IRDT)

Bi Bi Gol Mordeh-ye Sofla (Persian: بی‌بی‌گل‌مرده سفلی, also Romanized as Bī Bī Gol Mordeh-ye Soflá) is a village in Holayjan Rural District, in the Central District of Izeh County, Khuzestan Province, Iran. At the 2006 census, its population was 32, in 8 families.
