= Gomyek-e Vosta =

Gomyek-e Vosta گميك وسطي
- Village
- Location within Iran
- Coordinates: 31°48′33″N 49°47′42″E
- Country: Iran
- Province: Khuzestan
- County: Izeh
- Bakhsh: Central
- Rural District: Holayjan

Population (2006)
  - Total: 92
- Time zone: UTC+3:30 (IRST)
  - Summer (DST): UTC+4:30 (IRDT)

Gomyek-e Vosta (Persian: گميك وسطي, also Romanized as Gomyek-e Vosţá; also known as Gomīk and Gom Yek) is a village in Holayjan Rural District, in the Central District of Izeh County, Khuzestan Province, Iran. At the 2006 census, its population was 92, in 17 families.
