= Ketf =

Ketf (Persian: كفت) may refer to:

- Ketf-e Gusheh
- Ketf-e Zeytun
- KETF-CD, a low-power television station (channel 27, virtual 39) licensed to serve Laredo, Texas, United States
- KXOF-CD, a low-power televistion station (channel 31) licensed to serve Laredo, Texas, which held the call signs KETF-CA or KETF-CD from 2005 to 2018
