= Sarrak-e Olya =

Sarrak-e Olya سراك عليا
- Village
- Location within Iran
- Coordinates: 31°52′33″N 49°58′27″E
- Country: Iran
- Province: Khuzestan
- County: Izeh
- Bakhsh: Central
- Rural District: Howmeh-ye Sharqi

Population (2006)
  - Total: 941
- Time zone: UTC+3:30 (IRST)
  - Summer (DST): UTC+4:30 (IRDT)

Sarrak-e Olya (Persian: سراك عليا, also Romanized as Sarrāk-e ‘Olyā; also known as Sarrāk-e Bālā) is a village in Howmeh-ye Sharqi Rural District, in the Central District of Izeh County, Khuzestan Province, Iran. At the 2006 census, its population was 941, in 155 families.
