= Malsaidi-ye Sofla =

Malsaidi-ye Sofla مال سيدي سفلي
- Village
- Location within Iran
- Coordinates: 31°49′00″N 49°45′00″E
- Country: Iran
- Province: Khuzestan
- County: Izeh
- Bakhsh: Central
- Rural District: Holayjan

Population (2006)
  - Total: 74
- Time zone: UTC+3:30 (IRST)
  - Summer (DST): UTC+4:30 (IRDT)

Malsaidi-ye Sofla (Persian: مال سيدي سفلي, also Romanized as Mālsa‘īdī-ye Soflá) is a village in Holayjan Rural District, in the Central District of Izeh County, Khuzestan Province, Iran. At the 2006 census, its population was 74, in 13 families.
