= Varzard =

Varzard (Persian: ورزرد) may refer to:

- Varzard-e Olya
- Varzard-e Sofla
