= Kal Duzakh =

Kal Duzakh or Kalduzakh (Persian: كل دوزخ) may refer to:

- Kal Duzakh 1
- Kal Duzakh 2
