= Chahar Tang-e Olya =

Chahar Tang-e Olya چهارتنگ عليا
- Village
- Location within Iran
- Coordinates: 31°46′22″N 49°52′31″E
- Country: Iran
- Province: Khuzestan
- County: Izeh
- Bakhsh: Central
- Rural District: Howmeh-ye Sharqi

Population (2006)
  - Total: 488
- Time zone: UTC+3:30 (IRST)
  - Summer (DST): UTC+4:30 (IRDT)

Chahar Tang-e Olya (Persian: چهارتنگ عليا, also Romanized as Chahār Tang-e ‘Olyā and Chahār Tang ‘Olyā; also known as Chahār Tang-e Bālā) is a village in Howmeh-ye Sharqi Rural District, in the Central District of Izeh County, Khuzestan Province, Iran. At the 2006 census, its population was 488, in 83 families.
