= Abrak-e Do =

Abrak-e Do اب راك دو
- Village
- Location within Iran
- Coordinates: 31°49′18″N 49°56′57″E
- Country: Iran
- Province: Khuzestan
- County: Izeh
- Bakhsh: Central
- Rural District: Howmeh-ye Sharqi

Population (2006)
  - Total: 225
- Time zone: UTC+3:30 (IRST)
  - Summer (DST): UTC+4:30 (IRDT)

Abrak-e Do (Persian: اب راك دو, also Romanized as Ābrāk-e Do; also known as Ābrāk) is a village in Howmeh-ye Sharqi Rural District, in the Central District of Izeh County, Khuzestan Province, Iran. At the 2006 census, its population was 225, in 39 families.
