= Kubad =

Kubad (Persian: كوباد) may refer to:

- Kubad-e Moradi
- Kal Kubad

== See also ==
- Kubadabad
