= Howz Gel =

Howz Gel حوض گل
- Village
- Location within Iran
- Coordinates: 31°34′46″N 50°18′06″E
- Country: Iran
- Province: Khuzestan
- County: Izeh
- Bakhsh: Dehdez
- Rural District: Donbaleh Rud-e Jonubi

Population (2006)
  - Total: 42
- Time zone: UTC+3:30 (IRST)
  - Summer (DST): UTC+4:30 (IRDT)

Howz Gel (Persian: حوض گل, also Romanized as Ḩowẕ Gel) is a village in Donbaleh Rud-e Jonubi Rural District, Dehdez District, Izeh County, Khuzestan Province, Iran. At the 2006 census, its population was 42, in 6 families.

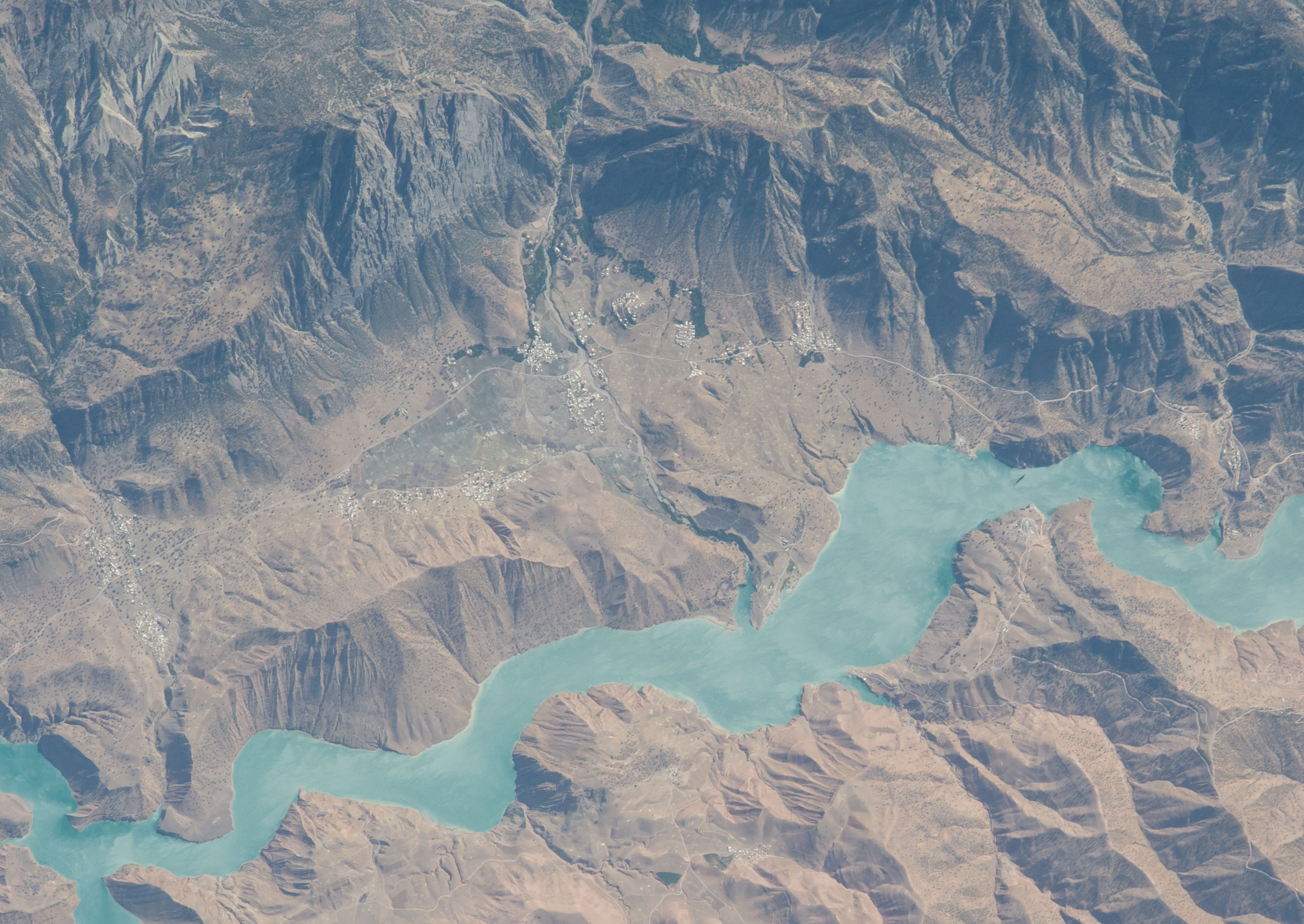
Karun-3 Lake, villages Bar Aftab-e Fazl and Howz Gol in Zagros Mountains
