= Varzard-e Sofla =

Varzard-e Sofla ورزردسفلي
- Village
- Location within Iran
- Coordinates: 31°55′00″N 49°40′37″E
- Country: Iran
- Province: Khuzestan
- County: Izeh
- Bakhsh: Central
- Rural District: Margha

Population (2006)
  - Total: 54
- Time zone: UTC+3:30 (IRST)
  - Summer (DST): UTC+4:30 (IRDT)

Varzard-e Sofla (Persian: ورزردسفلي, also Romanized as Varzard-e Soflá; also known as Varzard-e Pā‘īn) is a village in Margha Rural District, in the Central District of Izeh County, Khuzestan Province, Iran. At the 2006 census, its population was 54, in 12 families.
