= Chenarestan, Khuzestan =

Village in Khuzestan province, Iran

Chenarestan Persian: چنارستان
- Village
- Location within Iran
- Coordinates: 31°46′52″N 49°47′23″E
- Country: Iran
- Province: Khuzestan
- County: Izeh
- District: Central
- Rural District: Holayjan

Population (2016)
  - Total: 521
- Time zone: UTC+3:30 (IRST)

Chenarestan (Persian: چنارستان) (Note: Also romanized as Chenārestān) is a village in, and the capital of, Holayjan Rural District of the Central District of Izeh County, Khuzestan province, Iran.

== Demographics ==
=== Population ===
At the time of the 2006 National Census, the village's population was 655 in 122 households. The following census in 2011 counted 729 people in 149 households. The 2016 census measured the population of the village as 521 people in 128 households. It was the most populous village in its rural district.
