= Ableh-ye Sofla =

Village in Khuzestan, Iran

Ableh-ye Sofla ابله سفلي
- Village
- Location within Iran
- Coordinates: 31°49′12″N 49°43′16″E
- Country: Iran
- Province: Khuzestan
- County: Izeh
- Bakhsh: Central
- Rural District: Holayjan

Population (2006)
  - Total: 215
- Time zone: UTC+3:30 (IRST)
  - Summer (DST): UTC+4:30 (IRDT)

Ableh-ye Sofla (Persian: ابله سفلي, also Romanized as Ābleh-ye Soflá and Ābleh Soflá; also known as Ābeleh-ye Pā’īn, Ābleh, Ābleh-ye Pā’īn, and Ābleh-ye Pāīn) is a village in Holayjan Rural District, in the Central District of Izeh County, Khuzestan Province, Iran. At the 2006 census, its population was 215, in 38 families.
