= Tanbaku Kar-e Ebrahim =

Tanbaku Kar-e Ebrahim تنباكوكارابراهيم
- Village
- Location within Iran
- Coordinates: 31°58′03″N 49°40′18″E
- Country: Iran
- Province: Khuzestan
- County: Izeh
- Bakhsh: Central
- Rural District: Margha

Population (2006)
  - Total: 67
- Time zone: UTC+3:30 (IRST)
  - Summer (DST): UTC+4:30 (IRDT)

Tanbaku Kar-e Ebrahim (Persian: تنباكوكارابراهيم, also Romanized as Tanbākū Kār-e Ebrāhīm; also known as Tanbākū Kār-e Do) is a village in Margha Rural District, in the Central District of Izeh County, Khuzestan Province, Iran. At the 2006 census, its population was 67, in 14 families.
