= Chahar Tang-e Sofla =

Chahar Tang-e Sofla چهارتنگ سفلي
- Village
- Location within Iran
- Coordinates: 31°45′49″N 49°51′47″E
- Country: Iran
- Province: Khuzestan
- County: Izeh
- Bakhsh: Central
- Rural District: Howmeh-ye Sharqi

Population (2006)
  - Total: 345
- Time zone: UTC+3:30 (IRST)
  - Summer (DST): UTC+4:30 (IRDT)

Chahar Tang-e Sofla (Persian: چهارتنگ سفلي, also Romanized as Chahār Tang-e Soflá and Chahār Tang Soflá; also known as Chahār Tang-e Pā’īn) is a village in Howmeh-ye Sharqi Rural District, in the Central District of Izeh County, Khuzestan Province, Iran. At the 2006 census, its population was 345, in 51 families.
