= Jazestan, Khuzestan =

Village in Khuzestan province, Iran

Jazestan Persian: جازستان
- Village
- Location within Iran
- Coordinates: 31°56′04″N 49°37′40″E
- Country: Iran
- Province: Khuzestan
- County: Izeh
- District: Central
- Rural District: Margha

Population (2016)
  - Total: 361
- Time zone: UTC+3:30 (IRST)

Jazestan (Persian: جازستان) (Note: Also romanized as Jāzestān) is a village in Margha Rural District of the Central District of Izeh County, Khuzestan province, Iran.

== Demographics ==
=== Population ===
At the time of the 2006 National Census, the village's population was 231 in 38 households. The following census in 2011 counted 260 people in 51 households. The 2016 census measured the population of the village as 361 people in 74 households. It was the most populous village in its rural district.
