= Bar Aftab-e Ali Momen =

Bar Aftab-e Ali Momen برافتاب علي مومن
- Village
- Location within Iran
- Coordinates: 31°34′00″N 50°19′03″E
- Country: Iran
- Province: Khuzestan
- County: Izeh
- Bakhsh: Dehdez
- Rural District: Donbaleh Rud-e Jonubi

Population (2006)
  - Total: 167
- Time zone: UTC+3:30 (IRST)
  - Summer (DST): UTC+4:30 (IRDT)

Bar Aftab-e Ali Momen (Persian: برافتاب علي مومن, also Romanized as Bar Āftāb-e ‘Alī Mo’men) is a village in Donbaleh Rud-e Jonubi Rural District, Dehdez District, Izeh County, Khuzestan Province, Iran. At the 2006 census, its population was 167, in 29 families.
