= Kahbad =

Kahbad (Persian: كهباد) may refer to:

- Kahbad 1
- Kahbad 2
