= Abrak-e Azhgil =

Abrak-e Azhgil ابراك اژگيل
- Village
- Location within Iran
- Coordinates: 31°48′48″N 49°58′37″E
- Country: Iran
- Province: Khuzestan
- County: Izeh
- Bakhsh: Central
- Rural District: Howmeh-ye Sharqi

Population (2006)
  - Total: 936
- Time zone: UTC+3:30 (IRST)
  - Summer (DST): UTC+4:30 (IRDT)

Abrak-e Azhgil (Persian: ابراك اژگيل, also Romanized as Ābrāk-e Āzhgīl; also known as Ābrāk and Abrak Olya) is a village in Howmeh-ye Sharqi Rural District, in the Central District of Izeh County, Khuzestan Province, Iran. As of 2006, its population was 936, in 173 families.
