= Bi Bi Gol Mordeh =

Bi Bi Gol Mordeh (Persian: بي بي گل مرده) may refer to:

- Bi Bi Gol Mordeh-ye Olya
- Bi Bi Gol Mordeh-ye Sofla
