= Sarrag-e Khvajaveh =

Sarrag-e Khvajaveh سررگ خواجه
- Village
- Location within Iran
- Coordinates: 31°41′31″N 50°14′49″E
- Country: Iran
- Province: Khuzestan
- County: Izeh
- Bakhsh: Dehdez
- Rural District: Dehdez

Population (2006)
  - Total: 428
- Time zone: UTC+3:30 (IRST)
  - Summer (DST): UTC+4:30 (IRDT)

Sarrag-e Khvajaveh (Persian: سررگ خواجه, also Romanized as Sarrag-e Khvājaveh; also known as Sarrak-e Khvājavī) is a village in Dehdez Rural District, Dehdez District, Izeh County, Khuzestan Province, Iran. At the 2006 census, its population was 428, in 79 families.
