= Kal Duzakh-e Yek =

Kal Duzakh-e Yek كل دوزخ يك
- Village
- Location within Iran
- Coordinates: 31°49′16″N 49°54′15″E
- Country: Iran
- Province: Khuzestan
- County: Izeh
- Bakhsh: Central
- Rural District: Howmeh-ye Sharqi

Population (2006)
  - Total: 1,496
- Time zone: UTC+3:30 (IRST)
  - Summer (DST): UTC+4:30 (IRDT)

Kal Duzakh-e Yek (Persian: كل دوزخ يك, also Romanized as Kal Dūzakh-e Yek; also known as Kal Dūzakh) is a village in Howmeh-ye Sharqi Rural District, in the Central District of Izeh County, Khuzestan Province, Iran. At the 2006 census, its population was 1,496, in 256 families.
