= Gowd Gach =

Gowd Gach (Persian: گودگچ) may refer to:

- Gowd Gach-e Olya
- Gowd Gach-e Sofla
