= Bi Bi Gol Mordeh-ye Olya =

Bi Bi Gol Mordeh-ye Olya بی‌بی‌گل‌مرده علیا
- Village
- Location within Iran
- Coordinates: 31°44′33″N 49°49′25″E
- Country: Iran
- Province: Khuzestan
- County: Izeh
- Bakhsh: Central
- Rural District: Holayjan

Population (2006)
  - Total: 42
- Time zone: UTC+3:30 (IRST)
  - Summer (DST): UTC+4:30 (IRDT)

Bi Bi Gol Mordeh-ye Olya (Persian: بی‌بی‌گل‌مرده علیا, also Romanized as Bī Bī Gol Mordeh-ye ‘Olyā) is a village in Holayjan Rural District, in the Central District of Izeh County, Khuzestan Province, Iran. At the 2006 census, its population was 42, in 10 families.
