= Gomyek =

Gomyek or Gomik or Gom Yek (Persian: گميك) may refer to:

- Gomyek-e Sofla
- Gomyek-e Vosta
