= Gomyek-e Sofla =

Gomyek-e Sofla گميك سفلي
- Village
- Location within Iran
- Coordinates: 31°48′08″N 49°48′14″E
- Country: Iran
- Province: Khuzestan
- County: Izeh
- Bakhsh: Central
- Rural District: Holayjan

Population (2006)
  - Total: 40
- Time zone: UTC+3:30 (IRST)
  - Summer (DST): UTC+4:30 (IRDT)

Gomyek-e Sofla (Persian: گميك سفلي, also romanized as Gomyeh-e Soflá; also known as Gowmyek-e Soflá) is a village in Holayjan Rural District, in the Central District of Izeh County, Khuzestan Province, Iran. At the 2006 census its population was 40, in 6 families.
