= Abrak-e Yek =

Abrak-e Yek اب راك يك
- Village
- Location within Iran
- Coordinates: 31°48′09″N 49°57′40″E
- Country: Iran
- Province: Khuzestan
- County: Izeh
- Bakhsh: Central
- Rural District: Howmeh-ye Sharqi

Population (2006)
  - Total: 144
- Time zone: UTC+3:30 (IRST)
  - Summer (DST): UTC+4:30 (IRDT)

Abrak-e Yek (Persian: اب راك يك, also Romanized as Ābrāk-e Yek; also known as Ābrāk) is a village in Howmeh-ye Sharqi Rural District, in the Central District of Izeh County, Khuzestan Province, Iran. At the 2006 census, its population was 144, in 24 families.
