= Chiveh =

Village in Khuzestan, Iran

Chiveh چيوه
- Village
- Location within Iran
- Coordinates: 31°53′56″N 49°57′39″E
- Country: Iran
- Province: Khuzestan
- County: Izeh
- Bakhsh: Central
- Rural District: Howmeh-ye Sharqi

Population (2006)
  - Total: 96
- Time zone: UTC+3:30 (IRST)
  - Summer (DST): UTC+4:30 (IRDT)

Chiveh (Persian: چيوه, also Romanized as Chīveh; also known as Sarak, Sarrāk, and Sarrāk Chīv) is a village in Howmeh-ye Sharqi Rural District, in the Central District of Izeh County, Khuzestan Province, Iran. At the 2006 census, its population was 96, in 17 families.
