= Kahbad-e Yek =

Kahbad-e Yek كهباديك
- Village
- Location within Iran
- Coordinates: 31°50′27″N 49°55′52″E
- Country: Iran
- Province: Khuzestan
- County: Izeh
- Bakhsh: Central
- Rural District: Howmeh-ye Sharqi

Population (2006)
  - Total: 843
- Time zone: UTC+3:30 (IRST)
  - Summer (DST): UTC+4:30 (IRDT)

Kahbad-e Yek (Persian: كهباديك, also Romanized as Kahbād-e Yek; also known as Kal Kūbād) is a village in Howmeh-ye Sharqi Rural District, in the Central District of Izeh County, Khuzestan Province, Iran. At the 2006 census, its population was 843, in 143 families.
