= Bar Aftab-e Fazl =

Village in Khuzestan province, Iran

Bar Aftab-e Fazl Persian: برافتاب فاضل
- Village
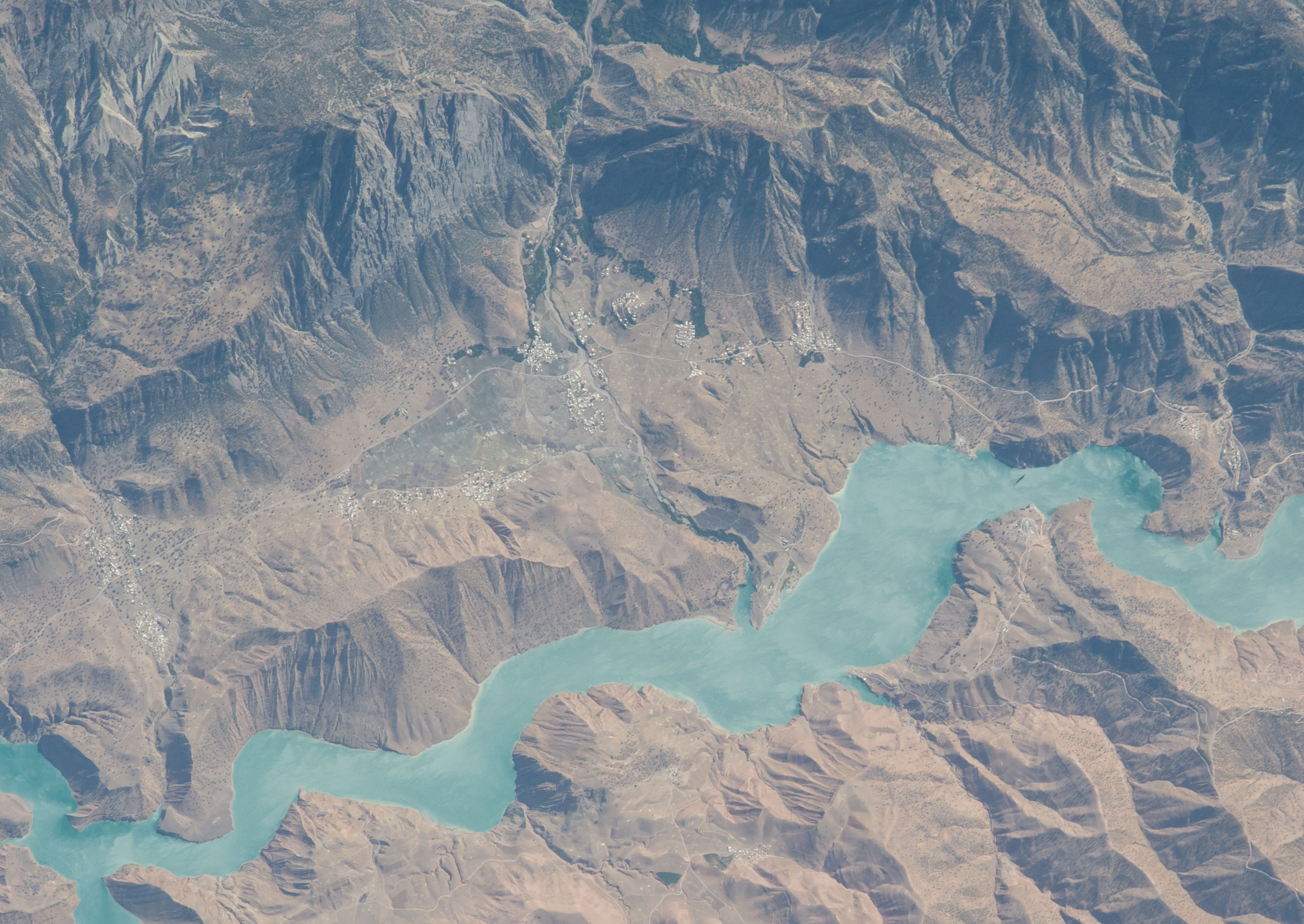
- Karun-3 Lake and the villages of Bar Aftab-e Fazl, Howz Gel, and Darbeh-ye Gharibi in the Zagros Mountains

- Location within Iran
- Coordinates: 31°33′44″N 50°18′33″E
- Country: Iran
- Province: Khuzestan
- County: Dezpart
- District: Qarun
- Rural District: Donbaleh Rud-e Jonubi

Population (2016)
  - Total: 294
- Time zone: UTC+3:30 (IRST)

Bar Aftab-e Fazl (Persian: برافتاب فاضل) (Note: Also romanized as Bar Āftāb-e Fāz̤l; also known as Bar Āftāb-e Bozorg) is a village in, and the capital of, Donbaleh Rud-e Jonubi Rural District of Qarun District, Dezpart County, Khuzestan province, Iran.

== Demographics ==
=== Population ===
At the time of the 2006 National Census, the village's population was 370 in 71 households, when it was in Dehdez District (Note: Renamed the Central District of Dezpart County) of Izeh County. The following census in 2011 counted 341 people in 71 households. The 2016 census measured the population of the village as 294 people in 69 households.

In 2021, the district was separated from the county in the establishment of Dezpart County and renamed the Central District. The rural district was separated from the district in the formation of Qarun District.
