= Sadak (disambiguation) =

Sadak may refer to:

== Places ==
- Satala, ancient Armenian settlement
- Manglaya Sadak, Indian town
- Sadak Arjuni, Indian town

== Other uses ==
- Sadak (name), list of people with the name
- Sadak, 1991 Indian film by Mahesh Bhatt
  - Sadak 2, 2020 Indian film by Mahesh Bhatt, sequel to the 1991 film
- Sadak Chhap, 1987 Indian film
- Sadak in Search of the Waters of Oblivion, a painting by John Martin

== See also ==
- Sarak (disambiguation)
- Pradhan Mantri Gram Sadak Yojana (lit. 'Prime Minister's Village Road Scheme'), a government of India initiative
