= Deh-e Bar Aftab =

Deh-e Bar Aftab (Persian: ده برافتاب) may refer to:

- Deh-e Bar Aftab-e Olya
- Deh-e Bar Aftab Vali-ye Jowkar
