= Bard Gapi =

Village in Khuzestan province, Iran

Bard Gapi Persian: بردگپي
- Village
- Location within Iran
- Coordinates: 31°48′38″N 49°53′22″E
- Country: Iran
- Province: Khuzestan
- County: Izeh
- District: Central
- Rural District: Howmeh-ye Sharqi

Population (2016)
  - Total: 3,318
- Time zone: UTC+3:30 (IRST)

Bard Gapi (Persian: بردگپي) (Note: Also romanized as Bard Gapī and Bard-i-Gappi; also known as Bard Gep) is a village in Howmeh-ye Sharqi Rural District of the Central District of Izeh County, Khuzestan province, Iran.

== Demographics ==
=== Population ===
At the time of the 2006 National Census, the village's population was 1,602 in 288 households. The following census in 2011 counted 2,965 people in 679 households. The 2016 census measured the population of the village as 3,318 people in 795 households. It was the most populous village in its rural district.
