= Kahbad-e Do =

Village in Khuzestan province, Iran

Kahbad-e Do Persian: كهباددو
- Village
- Location within Iran
- Coordinates: 31°51′19″N 49°55′08″E
- Country: Iran
- Province: Khuzestan
- County: Izeh
- District: Central
- Rural District: Howmeh-ye Sharqi

Population (2016)
  - Total: 1,189
- Time zone: UTC+3:30 (IRST)

Kahbad-e Do (Persian: كهباددو) (Note: Also romanized as Kahbād-e Do; also known as Kūbād-e Morādī) is a village in, and is the capital of, Howmeh-ye Sharqi Rural District of the Central District of Izeh County, Khuzestan province, Iran.

== Demographics ==
=== Population ===
At the time of the 2006 National Census, the village's population was 1,448 in 249 households. The following census in 2011, counted 1,382 people in 301 households. The 2016 census measured the population of the village as 1,189 people in 290 households.
