= Bar Aftab-e Amanallah =

Bar Aftab-e Amanallah برافتاب امان اله
- Village
- Location within Iran
- Coordinates: 32°00′16″N 49°50′44″E
- Country: Iran
- Province: Khuzestan
- County: Izeh
- Bakhsh: Susan
- Rural District: Susan-e Gharbi

Population (2006)
  - Total: 123
- Time zone: UTC+3:30 (IRST)
  - Summer (DST): UTC+4:30 (IRDT)

Bar Aftab-e Amanallah (Persian: برافتاب امان اله, also Romanized as Bar Āftāb-e Āmānāllah and Barāftāb-e Āmānollah) is a village in Susan-e Gharbi Rural District, Susan District, Izeh County, Khuzestan Province, Iran. At the 2006 census, its population was 123, in 25 families.
