= Dehdez =

City in Khuzestan province, Iran

Dehdez Persian: دهدز
- City
- Location within Iran
- Coordinates: 31°42′15″N 50°17′31″E
- Country: Iran
- Province: Khuzestan
- County: Dezpart
- District: Central

Population (2016)
  - Total: 5,490
- Time zone: UTC+3:30 (IRST)

Dehdez (Persian: دهدز) (Note: Also romanized as Dehdaz and Deh-e Dez; also known as Deh Diz) is a city in the Central District (Note: Formerly Dehdez District of Izeh County) of Dezpart County, Khuzestan province, Iran, serving as capital of both the county and the district. It was the administrative center for Dehdez Rural District until its capital was transferred to the village of Deh Kohneh-ye Muzarm.

== Demographics ==
=== Population ===
At the time of the 2006 National Census, the city's population was 3,610 in 651 households, when it was the capital of Dehdez District (Note: Renamed the Central District of Dezpart County) of Izeh County. The following census in 2011 counted 4,920 residents in 994 households. The 2016 census measured the population of the city as 5,490 people in 1,312 households.

In 2021, the district was separated from the county in the establishment of Dezpart County and renamed the Central District.

== Climate ==
Dehdez has a Mediterranean-influenced humid continental climate (Köppen: "Dsa"), with cold winters, hot summers, and mild springs and autumns.

Climate data for Dehdez (1991-2021)
Month	Jan	Feb	Mar	Apr	May	Jun	Jul	Aug	Sep	Oct	Nov	Dec	Year
Mean daily maximum °C (°F)	4.1 (39.4)	6.4 (43.5)	14 (57)	20.3 (68.5)	27.3 (81.1)	33.8 (92.8)	36.3 (97.3)	36 (97)	32.1 (89.8)	25.6 (78.1)	15.7 (60.3)	9.1 (48.4)	21.7 (71.1)
Daily mean °C (°F)	−0.4 (31.3)	1.9 (35.4)	9 (48)	15.6 (60.1)	22.3 (72.1)	28.2 (82.8)	30.8 (87.4)	30.5 (86.9)	26.2 (79.2)	20.2 (68.4)	11 (52)	4.2 (39.6)	16.6 (61.9)
Mean daily minimum °C (°F)	−8.8 (16.2)	−3.4 (25.9)	2.9 (37.2)	9.6 (49.3)	15.9 (60.6)	21.1 (70.0)	24.3 (75.7)	23.9 (75.0)	19.6 (67.3)	14.4 (57.9)	5.9 (42.6)	−1.3 (29.7)	10.3 (50.6)
Average precipitation mm (inches)	197 (7.8)	179 (7.0)	196 (7.7)	120 (4.7)	27 (1.1)	1 (0.0)	0 (0)	0 (0)	0 (0)	24 (0.9)	114 (4.5)	175 (6.9)	1,033 (40.6)
Average precipitation days (≥ 1.0 mm)	9	9	9	8	3	0	0	0	0	2	6	7	53
Average relative humidity (%)	68	68	60	50	30	18	19	19	21	31	56	66	42
Source: https://en.climate-data.org/asia/iran/khuzestan/دهدز-956634/
