= Bar Aftab, Izeh =

Bar Aftab برافتاب
- Village
- Location within Iran
- Coordinates: 31°53′18″N 49°59′40″E
- Country: Iran
- Province: Khuzestan
- CountyAnil kasarwal: Izeh
- Bakhsh: Susan
- Rural District: Susan-e Gharbi

Population (2006)
  - Total: 99
- Time zone: UTC+3:30 (IRST)
  - Summer (DST): UTC+4:30 (IRDT)

Bar Aftab (Persian: برافتاب, also Romanized as Bar Āftāb; also known as Bar Aftab Donbaleh Rood and Bar Āftāb-e Talkh Āb) is a village in Susan-e Gharbi Rural District, Susan District, Izeh County, Khuzestan Province, Iran. At the 2006 census, its population was 99, in 19 families.
