= Shivand Rural District =

Rural district in Khuzestan province, Iran

Shivand Rural District Persian: دهستان شیوند
- Rural District
- Location within Iran
- Coordinates: 31°38′16″N 50°08′20″E
- Country: Iran
- Province: Khuzestan
- County: Dezpart
- District: Qarun
- Capital: Nowshivand
- Time zone: UTC+3:30 (IRST)

Shivand Rural District (Persian: دهستان شیوند) is in Qarun District of Dezpart County, Khuzestan province, Iran. Its capital is the village of Nowshivand, whose population at the time of the 2016 National Census was 277 people in 65 households.

== History ==
In 2021, Dehdez District (Note: Renamed the Central District of Dezpart County) was separated from Izeh County in the establishment of Dezpart County and renamed the Central District. Donbaleh Rud-e Jonubi Rural District was separated from the district in the formation of Qarun District, and Shivand Rural District was created in the new district.
