= Bar Aftab, Hormozgan =

Bar Aftab برافتاب
- Village
- Location within Iran
- Coordinates: 28°15′15″N 55°43′48″E
- Country: Iran
- Province: Hormozgan
- County: Hajjiabad
- Bakhsh: Central
- Rural District: Tarom

Population (2006)
  - Total: 472
- Time zone: UTC+3:30 (IRST)
  - Summer (DST): UTC+4:30 (IRDT)

Bar Aftab (Persian: برافتاب, also Romanized as Bar Āftāb) is a village in Tarom Rural District, in the Central District of Hajjiabad County, Hormozgan Province, Iran. At the 2006 census, its population was 472, in 118 families.
