= Jub Baghan-e Sofla =

Jub Baghan-e Sofla جوبباغان سفلي
- Village
- Location within Iran
- Coordinates: 34°19′12″N 45°54′15″E
- Country: Iran
- Province: Kermanshah
- County: Gilan-e Gharb
- Bakhsh: Central
- Rural District: Direh

Population (2006)
  - Total: 140
- Time zone: UTC+3:30 (IRST)
  - Summer (DST): UTC+4:30 (IRDT)

Jub Baghan-e Sofla (Persian: جوبباغان سفلي, also Romanized as Jūb Bāghān-e Soflá; also known as Barāftāb) is a village in Direh Rural District, in the Central District of Gilan-e Gharb County, Kermanshah Province, Iran. At the 2006 census, its population was 140, in 33 families.
