= Bar Aftab-e Golin =

Bar Aftab-e Golin بر افتاب گلين
- Village
- Country: Iran
- Province: Kermanshah
- County: Sarpol-e Zahab
- Bakhsh: Central
- Rural District: Qaleh Shahin

Population (2006)
  - Total: 89
- Time zone: UTC+3:30 (IRST)
  - Summer (DST): UTC+4:30 (IRDT)

Bar Aftab-e Golin (Persian: بر افتاب گلين, also Romanized as Bar Aftāb-e Golīn) is a village in Qaleh Shahin Rural District, in the Central District of Sarpol-e Zahab County, Kermanshah Province, Iran. At the 2006 census, its population was 89, in 18 families.
