= Bar Aftab, Bagh-e Malek =

Bar Aftab برافتاب
- Village
- Location within Iran
- Coordinates: 31°28′08″N 49°56′36″E
- Country: Iran
- Province: Khuzestan
- County: Bagh-e Malek
- Bakhsh: Central
- Rural District: Haparu

Population (2006)
  - Total: 562
- Time zone: UTC+3:30 (IRST)
  - Summer (DST): UTC+4:30 (IRDT)

Bar Aftab (Persian: برافتاب, also Romanized as Bar Āftāb; also known as Bar Āftāb-e Manganān, Bar Āftāb-e Monganān, Bar Aftau, and Bat Aftau) is a village in Haparu Rural District, in the Central District of Bagh-e Malek County, Khuzestan Province, Iran. At the 2006 census, its population was 562, in 104 families.
