= Bar Aftab-e Tahlivan =

Bar Aftab-e Tahlivan برافتاب تهليون
- Village
- Location within Iran
- Coordinates: 30°59′01″N 50°35′57″E
- Country: Iran
- Province: Kohgiluyeh and Boyer-Ahmad
- County: Boyer-Ahmad
- Bakhsh: Ludab
- Rural District: Chin

Population (2006)
  - Total: 112
- Time zone: UTC+3:30 (IRST)
  - Summer (DST): UTC+4:30 (IRDT)

Bar Aftab-e Tahlivan (Persian: برافتاب تهليون, also Romanized as Bar Āftāb-e Tahlīvan; also known as Bar Āftāb, Bar Āftāb-e Bālā, and Bar Āftāb-e ‘Olyā) is a village in Chin Rural District, Ludab District, Boyer-Ahmad County, Kohgiluyeh and Boyer-Ahmad Province, Iran. At the 2006 census, its population was 112, in 17 families.
