= Bar Aftab, Kermanshah =

Bar Aftab برافتاب
- Village
- Location within Iran
- Coordinates: 34°32′02″N 47°22′58″E
- Country: Iran
- Province: Kermanshah
- County: Harsin
- Bakhsh: Bisotun
- Rural District: Cham Chamal

Population (2006)
  - Total: 136
- Time zone: UTC+3:30 (IRST)
  - Summer (DST): UTC+4:30 (IRDT)

Bar Aftab (Persian: برافتاب, also Romanized as Bar Āftāb; also known as Barāftābeh) is a village in Cham Chamal Rural District, Bisotun District, Harsin County, Kermanshah Province, Iran. At the 2006 census, its population was 136, in 34 families.
