= Bar Aftab-e Shirani =

Bar Aftab-e Shirani برافتاب شيراني
- Village
- Country: Iran
- Province: Chaharmahal and Bakhtiari
- County: Lordegan
- Bakhsh: Central
- Rural District: Milas

Population (2006)
  - Total: 4,126
- Time zone: UTC+3:30 (IRST)
  - Summer (DST): UTC+4:30 (IRDT)

Bar Aftab-e Shirani (Persian: برافتاب شيراني, also Romanized as Bar Āftāb-e Shīrānī) is a village in Milas Rural District, in the Central District of Lordegan County, Chaharmahal and Bakhtiari Province, Iran. At the 2006 census, its population was 4,126, in 798 families.
