= Sheykh Mohammad, Fars =

Sheykh Mohammad شيخ محمد
- Village
- Location within Iran
- Coordinates: 30°11′58″N 51°40′40″E
- Country: Iran
- Province: Fars
- County: Mamasani
- Bakhsh: Central
- Rural District: Javid-e Mahuri

Population (2006)
  - Total: 40
- Time zone: UTC+3:30 (IRST)
  - Summer (DST): UTC+4:30 (IRDT)

Sheykh Mohammad (Persian: شيخ محمد, also Romanized as Sheykh Moḩammad; also known as Bar Āftāb and Bar Āftāb Sheykh Mohammad) is a village in Javid-e Mahuri Rural District, in the Central District of Mamasani County, Fars province, Iran. At the 2006 census, its population was 40, in 12 families.
