= Sərək =

Municipality in Astara, Azerbaijan

- Municipality
- Location within Azerbaijan
- Coordinates: 38°29′50″N 48°47′35″E
- Country: Azerbaijan
- Rayon: Astara

Population
  - Total: 1,603
- Time zone: UTC+4 (AZT)
  - Summer (DST): UTC+5 (AZT)

Sərək is a village and municipality in the Astara Rayon of Azerbaijan. It has a population of 1,603.

== Notable natives ==
- Aghahasan Nakhmetov — Full Cavalier of the Order of Glory.
- Yalchin Nasirov — National Hero of Azerbaijan.
