= Kushk, Kohgiluyeh =

Kushk كوشك
- Village
- Location within Iran
- Coordinates: 30°50′13″N 50°37′49″E
- Country: Iran
- Province: Kohgiluyeh and Boyer-Ahmad
- County: Kohgiluyeh
- Bakhsh: Central
- Rural District: Dehdasht-e Sharqi

Population (2006)
  - Total: 392
- Time zone: UTC+3:30 (IRST)
  - Summer (DST): UTC+4:30 (IRDT)

Kushk (Persian: كوشك, also Romanized as Kūshk; also known as Bar Āftāb and Qal‘eh Kūshk) is a village in Dehdasht-e Sharqi Rural District, in the Central District of Kohgiluyeh County, Kohgiluyeh and Boyer-Ahmad Province, Iran. At the 2006 census, its population was 392, in 74 families.
