= Bar Aftab-e Shidan =

Bar Aftab-e Shidan برافتاب شيدان
- Village
- Location within Iran
- Coordinates: 31°31′09″N 50°48′32″E
- Country: Iran
- Province: Chaharmahal and Bakhtiari
- County: Lordegan
- Bakhsh: Central
- Rural District: Milas

Population (2006)
  - Total: 488
- Time zone: UTC+3:30 (IRST)
  - Summer (DST): UTC+4:30 (IRDT)

Bar Aftab-e Shidan (Persian: برافتاب شيدان, also Romanized as Bar Āftāb-e Shīdān) is a village in Milas Rural District, in the Central District of Lordegan County, Chaharmahal and Bakhtiari Province, Iran. At the 2006 census, its population was 488, in 93 families.
