= Chahar Tang-e Qalandari =

Chahar Tang-e Qalandari چهارتنگ قلندري
- Village
- Location within Iran
- Coordinates: 30°59′18″N 50°48′09″E
- Country: Iran
- Province: Kohgiluyeh and Boyer-Ahmad
- County: Boyer-Ahmad
- Bakhsh: Ludab
- Rural District: Ludab

Population (2006)
  - Total: 88
- Time zone: UTC+3:30 (IRST)
  - Summer (DST): UTC+4:30 (IRDT)

Chahar Tang-e Qalandari (Persian: چهارتنگ قلندري, also Romanized as Chahār Tang-e Qalanadrī; also known as Chahār Tang and Chehār Tang) is a village in Ludab Rural District, Ludab District, Boyer-Ahmad County, Kohgiluyeh and Boyer-Ahmad Province, Iran. At the 2006 census, its population was 88, in 19 families.
