= Baraftab-e Bi =

Baraftab-e Bi برافتاب بي
- Village
- Location within Iran
- Coordinates: 33°39′42″N 46°53′31″E
- Country: Iran
- Province: Ilam
- County: Chardavol
- Bakhsh: Zagros
- Rural District: Bijnavand

Population (2006)
  - Total: 524
- Time zone: UTC+3:30 (IRST)
  - Summer (DST): UTC+4:30 (IRDT)

Baraftab-e Bi (Persian: برافتاب بي, also Romanized as Barāftāb-e Bī; also known as Barāftāb-e Bagī and Barāftāb-e Beygī) is a village in Bijnavand Rural District, in the Zagros District of Chardavol County, Ilam Province, Iran. At the 2006 census, its population was 524, in 110 families. The village is populated by Kurds.
