= Bar Aftab-e Heydarqoli =

Bar Aftab-e Heydarqoli برافتاب حيدرقلي
- Village
- Location within Iran
- Coordinates: 32°21′00″N 49°50′53″E
- Country: Iran
- Province: Khuzestan
- County: Andika
- Bakhsh: Chelo
- Rural District: Chelo

Population (2006)
  - Total: 115
- Time zone: UTC+3:30 (IRST)
  - Summer (DST): UTC+4:30 (IRDT)

Bar Aftab-e Heydarqoli (Persian: برافتاب حيدرقلي, also Romanized as Bar Āftāb-e Ḩeydarqolī; also known as Barāftāb) is a village in Chelo Rural District, Chelo District, Andika County, Khuzestan Province, Iran. At the 2006 census, its population was 115, in 20 families.
