= Baraftab-e Chalab Zard =

Baraftab-e Chalab Zard برافتاب چالاب زرد
- Village
- Location within Iran
- Coordinates: 33°40′06″N 46°51′47″E
- Country: Iran
- Province: Ilam
- County: Chardavol
- Bakhsh: Zagros
- Rural District: Bijnavand

Population (2006)
  - Total: 69
- Time zone: UTC+3:30 (IRST)
  - Summer (DST): UTC+4:30 (IRDT)

Baraftab-e Chalab Zard (Persian: برافتاب چالاب زرد, also Romanized as Barāftāb-e Chālāb Zard) is a village in Bijnavand Rural District, in the Zagros District of Chardavol County, Ilam Province, Iran. At the 2006 census, its population was 69, in 16 families. The village is populated by Kurds.
