= Bar Aftab-e Ali Karami =

Bar Aftab-e Ali Karami برافتاب علي كرمي
- Village
- Country: Iran
- Province: Kohgiluyeh and Boyer-Ahmad
- County: Dana
- Bakhsh: Kabgian
- Rural District: Chenar

Population (2006)
  - Total: 53
- Time zone: UTC+3:30 (IRST)
  - Summer (DST): UTC+4:30 (IRDT)

Bar Aftab-e Ali Karami (Persian: برافتاب علي كرمي, also Romanized as Bar Āftāb-e ʿAlī Karamī) is a village in Chenar Rural District, Kabgian District, Dana County, Kohgiluyeh and Boyer-Ahmad Province, Iran. At the 2006 census, its population was 53, in 12 families.
