= Bar Aftab, Dorud =

Bar Aftab برآفتاب
- Village
- Location within Iran
- Coordinates: 33°22′36″N 49°00′23″E
- Country: Iran
- Province: Lorestan
- County: Dorud
- Bakhsh: Central
- Rural District: Dorud

Population (2005)
  - Total: 139
- Time zone: UTC+3:30 (IRST)
  - Summer (DST): UTC+4:30 (IRDT)

Bar Aftab (Persian: برآفتاب, also Romanized as Bar Āftāb) is a village in Dorud Rural District, in the Central District of Dorud County, Lorestan Province, Iran. At the 2006 census, its population was 139, in 24 families.
