= Bar Aftab-e Deraz =

Bar Aftab-e Deraz برآفتاب دراز
- village
- Location within Iran
- Coordinates: 33°34′02″N 49°15′21″E
- Country: Iran
- Province: Lorestan
- County: Dorud
- Bakhsh: Central
- Rural District: Zhan

Population (2006)
  - Total: 60
- Time zone: UTC+3:30 (IRST)
  - Summer (DST): UTC+4:30 (IRDT)

Bar Aftab-e Deraz (Persian: برآفتاب دراز, also Romanized as Bar Āftāb-e Derāz) is a village in Zhan Rural District, within the Central District of Dorud County, Lorestan Province, Iran. According to the 2006 census, the village had a population of 60 residents, in 14 families.
