= Deh-e Bar Aftab Vali-ye Jowkar =

Village in Kohgiluyeh and Boyer-Ahmad, Iran

Deh-e Bar Aftab Vali-ye Jowkar ده برافتاب ولي جوكار
- Village
- Location within Iran
- Coordinates: 30°50′31″N 51°14′08″E
- Country: Iran
- Province: Kohgiluyeh and Boyer-Ahmad
- County: Boyer-Ahmad
- Bakhsh: Margown
- Rural District: Margown

Population (2006)
  - Total: 36
- Time zone: UTC+3:30 (IRST)
  - Summer (DST): UTC+4:30 (IRDT)

Deh-e Bar Aftab Vali-ye Jowkar (Persian: ده برافتاب ولي جوكار, also Romanized as Deh-e Bar Āftāb Valī-ye Jowkār; also known as Deh-e Bar Āftāb) is a village in Margown Rural District, Margown District, Boyer-Ahmad County, Kohgiluyeh and Boyer-Ahmad Province, Iran. At the 2006 census, its population was 36, in 5 families.
