= Tanbaku Kar-e Pain =

Tanbaku Kar-e Pain تنباکوکار پایین
- Village
- Location within Iran
- Coordinates: 32°45′49″N 48°19′03″E
- Country: Iran
- Province: Khuzestan
- County: Andimeshk
- Bakhsh: Alvar-e Garmsiri
- Rural District: Qilab

Population (2006)
  - Total: 15
- Time zone: UTC+3:30 (IRST)
  - Summer (DST): UTC+4:30 (IRDT)

Tanbaku Kar-e Pain (Persian: تنباکوکار پایین, also Romanized as Tanbākū Kār-e Pā’īn; also known as Tanbākū Kār) is a village in Qilab Rural District, Alvar-e Garmsiri District, Andimeshk County, Khuzestan Province, Iran. At the 2006 census, its population was 15, in 4 families.
