= Bar Aftab-e Chel Khorasan =

Bar Aftab-e Chel Khorasan برافتابچل خرسان
- Village
- Location within Iran
- Coordinates: 32°17′51″N 49°50′51″E
- Country: Iran
- Province: Khuzestan
- County: Andika
- Bakhsh: Central
- Rural District: Shalal and Dasht-e Gol

Population (2006)
  - Total: 35
- Time zone: UTC+3:30 (IRST)
  - Summer (DST): UTC+4:30 (IRDT)

Bar Aftab-e Chel Khorasan (Persian: برافتابچل خرسان, also Romanized as Bar Āftāb-e Chel Khorasān; also known as Bar Āftāb) is a village in Shalal and Dasht-e Gol Rural District, in the Central District of Andika County, Khuzestan Province, Iran. At the 2006 census, its population was 35, in 6 families.
