= Sadak (name) =

Sadak is a surname. Notable people with the surname include:

- John Sadak (born 1979), American television and radio sports announcer
- Necmettin Sadak (1890–1953), Turkish politician
- Selim Sadak (1954–2026), Turkish Kurdish politician
