= Deh-e Bar Aftab-e Olya =

Deh-e Bar Aftab-e Olya ده برافتاب عليا
- Village
- Location within Iran
- Coordinates: 30°46′38″N 51°30′39″E
- Country: Iran
- Province: Kohgiluyeh and Boyer-Ahmad
- County: Boyer-Ahmad
- Bakhsh: Central
- Rural District: Sarrud-e Shomali

Population (2006)
  - Total: 1,113
- Time zone: UTC+3:30 (IRST)
  - Summer (DST): UTC+4:30 (IRDT)

Deh-e Bar Aftab-e Olya (Persian: ده برافتاب عليا, also Romanized as Deh-e Bar Āftāb-e ‘Olyā; also known as Bar Āftāb and Deh-e Bar Āftāb) is a village in Sarrud-e Shomali Rural District, in the Central District of Boyer-Ahmad County, Kohgiluyeh and Boyer-Ahmad Province, Iran. At the 2006 census, its population was 1,113, in 232 families.
