= Tanbaku Kar, Lali =

Tanbaku Kar تنباكوكار
- Village
- Country: Iran
- Province: Khuzestan
- County: Lali
- Bakhsh: Hati
- Rural District: Jastun Shah

Population (2006)
  - Total: 50
- Time zone: UTC+3:30 (IRST)
  - Summer (DST): UTC+4:30 (IRDT)

Tanbaku Kar (Persian: تنباكوكار, also Romanized as Tanbāḵū Kār) is a village in Jastun Shah Rural District, Hati District, Lali County, Khuzestan Province, Iran. At the 2006 census, its population was 50, in 11 families.
