= Bar Aftab-e Emam Reza =

Bar Aftab-e Emam Reza برافتاب امام رضا
- Village
- Location within Iran
- Coordinates: 31°13′32″N 50°24′37″E
- Country: Iran
- Province: Kohgiluyeh and Boyer-Ahmad
- County: Kohgiluyeh
- Bakhsh: Charusa
- Rural District: Tayebi-ye Sarhadi-ye Gharbi

Population (2006)
  - Total: 60
- Time zone: UTC+3:30 (IRST)
  - Summer (DST): UTC+4:30 (IRDT)

Bar Aftab-e Emam Reza (Persian: برافتاب امام رضا, also Romanized as Bar Āftāb-e Emām Reẕā; also known as Bar Āftāb) is a village in Tayebi-ye Sarhadi-ye Gharbi Rural District, Charusa District, Kohgiluyeh County, Kohgiluyeh and Boyer-Ahmad Province, Iran. At the 2006 census, its population was 60, in 11 families.
