= Bar Aftab-e Akbar =

Bar Aftab-e Akbar برافتاب اكبر
- Village
- Location within Iran
- Coordinates: 32°19′58″N 49°46′08″E
- Country: Iran
- Province: Khuzestan
- County: Andika
- Bakhsh: Chelo
- Rural District: Chelo

Population (2006)
  - Total: 154
- Time zone: UTC+3:30 (IRST)
  - Summer (DST): UTC+4:30 (IRDT)

Bar Aftab-e Akbar (Persian: برافتاب اكبر, also Romanized as Bar Āftāb-e Ākbar; also known as Barāftāb) is a village in Chelo Rural District, Chelo District, Andika County, Khuzestan Province, Iran. At the 2006 census, its population was 154, in 23 families.
