= Baraftab-e Meleh Maran =

Baraftab-e Meleh Maran برافتاب مله ماران
- Village
- Location within Iran
- Coordinates: 33°36′59″N 46°43′40″E
- Country: Iran
- Province: Ilam
- County: Sirvan
- Bakhsh: Karezan
- Rural District: Zangvan

Population (2006)
  - Total: 149
- Time zone: UTC+3:30 (IRST)
  - Summer (DST): UTC+4:30 (IRDT)

Baraftab-e Meleh Maran (Persian: برافتاب مله ماران, also Romanized as Barāftāb-e Meleh Mārān) is a village in Zangvan Rural District, Karezan District, Sirvan County, Ilam Province, Iran. At the 2006 census, its population was 149, in 29 families. The village is populated by Kurds.
