= Bar Aftab-e Kochala =

Bar Aftab-e Kochala برافتاب كچلا
- Village
- Location within Iran
- Coordinates: 30°45′09″N 50°47′54″E
- Country: Iran
- Province: Kohgiluyeh and Boyer-Ahmad
- County: Charam
- Bakhsh: Sarfaryab
- Rural District: Sarfaryab

Population (2006)
  - Total: 144
- Time zone: UTC+3:30 (IRST)
  - Summer (DST): UTC+4:30 (IRDT)

Bar Aftab-e Kochala (Persian: برافتاب كچلا, also Romanized as Bar Āftāb-e Kochalā; also known as Bar Āftāb) is a village in Sarfaryab Rural District, Sarfaryab District, Charam County, Kohgiluyeh and Boyer-Ahmad Province, Iran. At the 2006 census, its population was 144, in 29 families.
