= Baraftab-e Seyd Mohammad =

Baraftab-e Seyd Mohammad برافتاب سيدمحمد
- Village
- Location within Iran
- Coordinates: 33°28′42″N 47°45′17″E
- Country: Iran
- Province: Lorestan
- County: Kuhdasht
- Bakhsh: Central
- Rural District: Kuhdasht-e Jonubi

Population (2006)
  - Total: 402
- Time zone: UTC+3:30 (IRST)
  - Summer (DST): UTC+4:30 (IRDT)

Baraftab-e Seyd Mohammad (Persian: برافتاب سيدمحمد, also Romanized as Barāftāb-e Şeyd Moḩammad and Bar Āftāb-e Seyyed Moḩammad; also known as Bar Āftāb and Barāftāb Saiyid Muhammad Chinār) is a village in Kuhdasht-e Jonubi Rural District, in the Central District of Kuhdasht County, Lorestan Province, Iran. At the 2006 census, its population was 402, in 80 families.
