= Bar Aftab-e Sofla, Khuzestan =

Bar Aftab-e Sofla برافتاب سفلي
- Village
- Location within Iran
- Coordinates: 32°00′20″N 49°50′41″E
- Country: Iran
- Province: Khuzestan
- County: Dezful
- Bakhsh: Sardasht
- Rural District: Seyyedvaliyeddin

Population (2006)
  - Total: 46
- Time zone: UTC+3:30 (IRST)
  - Summer (DST): UTC+4:30 (IRDT)

Bar Aftab-e Sofla (Persian: برافتاب سفلي, also Romanized as Bar Āftāb-e Soflá; also known as Bar Āftāb-e Pā’īn) is a village in Seyyedvaliyeddin Rural District, Sardasht District, Dezful County, Khuzestan Province, Iran. At the 2006 census, its population was 46, in 8 families.
