= Sarrag =

Village in Khuzestan, Iran

Sarrag سرراگ
- Village
- Location within Iran
- Coordinates: 32°03′23″N 49°39′54″E
- Country: Iran
- Province: Khuzestan
- County: Lali
- Bakhsh: Hati
- Rural District: Jastun Shah

Population (2006)
  - Total: 31
- Time zone: UTC+3:30 (IRST)
  - Summer (DST): UTC+4:30 (IRDT)

Sarrag (Persian: سرراگ, also Romanized as Sarak, Sardag, Sar Rag, and Sarrāk) is a village in Jastun Shah Rural District, Hati District, Lali County, Khuzestan Province, Iran. At the 2006 census, its population was 31, in 6 families.
