= Bar Aftab-e Sefid =

Bar Aftab-e Sefid برافتاب سفيد
- Village
- Location within Iran
- Coordinates: 31°05′03″N 50°44′04″E
- Country: Iran
- Province: Kohgiluyeh and Boyer-Ahmad
- County: Kohgiluyeh
- Bakhsh: Charusa
- Rural District: Tayebi-ye Sarhadi-ye Gharbi

Population (2006)
  - Total: 66
- Time zone: UTC+3:30 (IRST)
  - Summer (DST): UTC+4:30 (IRDT)

Bar Aftab-e Sefid (Persian: برافتاب سفيد, also romanized as Bar Āftāb-e Sefīd; also known as Bar Āftāb-e Soflá) is a village in Tayebi-ye Sarhadi-ye Gharbi Rural District, Charusa District, Kohgiluyeh County, Kohgiluyeh and Boyer-Ahmad Province, Iran. At the 2006 census.its population was 66 and there were 13 families.
