= Bar Aftab-e Sofla, Kohgiluyeh and Boyer-Ahmad =

Bar Aftab-e Sofla برافتاب سفلي
- Village
- Location within Iran
- Coordinates: 30°59′00″N 50°35′00″E
- Country: Iran
- Province: Kohgiluyeh and Boyer-Ahmad
- County: Kohgiluyeh
- Bakhsh: Central
- Rural District: Doshman Ziari

Population (2006)
  - Total: 289
- Time zone: UTC+3:30 (IRST)
  - Summer (DST): UTC+4:30 (IRDT)

Bar Aftab-e Sofla (Persian: برافتاب سفلي, also Romanized as Bar Āftāb-e Soflá; also known as Bar Āftāb-e Pā’īn) is a village in Doshman Ziari Rural District, in the Central District of Kohgiluyeh County, Kohgiluyeh and Boyer-Ahmad Province, Iran. At the 2006 census, its population was 289, in 56 families.
