= Pian Rural District =

Rural district in Khuzestan province, Iran

Pian Rural District Persian: دهستان پيان
- Rural District
- Location within Iran
- Coordinates: 32°06′59″N 49°43′00″E
- Country: Iran
- Province: Khuzestan
- County: Izeh
- District: Central
- Capital: Posht-e Pian

Population (2016)
  - Total: 9,607
- Time zone: UTC+3:30 (IRST)

Pian Rural District (Persian: دهستان پيان) is in the Central District of Izeh County, Khuzestan province, Iran. Its capital is the village of Posht-e Pian.

== Demographics ==
=== Population ===
At the time of the 2006 National Census, the rural district's population was 11,782 in 2,091 households. There were 11,068 inhabitants in 2,194 households at the following census of 2011. The 2016 census measured the population of the rural district as 9,607 in 2,215 households. The most populous of its 92 villages was Posht-e Pian, with 2,325 people.
