= Qarun District =

District in Khuzestan province, Iran

Qarun District Persian: بخش قارون
- District
- Location within Iran
- Coordinates: 31°35′30″N 50°11′04″E
- Country: Iran
- Province: Khuzestan
- County: Dezpart
- Capital: Mallah
- Time zone: UTC+3:30 (IRST)

Qarun District (Persian: بخش قارون) is in Dezpart County of Khuzestan province, Iran. Its capital is the village of Mallah, whose population at the time of the 2016 National Census was 500 people in 123 households.

== History ==
In 2021, Dehdez District (Note: Renamed the Central District of Dezpart County) was separated from Izeh County in the establishment of Dezpart County and renamed the Central District. Donbaleh Rud-e Jonubi Rural District was separated from the district in the formation of Qarun District, including the new Shivand Rural District.

== Demographics ==
=== Administrative divisions ===
Qarun District
Administrative Divisions
Donbaleh Rud-e Jonubi RD
Shivand RD
RD = Rural District
