= Donbaleh Rud-e Jonubi Rural District =

Rural district in Khuzestan province, Iran

Donbaleh Rud-e Jonubi Rural District Persian: دهستان دنباله‌رود جنوبی
- Rural District
- Location within Iran
- Coordinates: 31°30′41″N 50°14′58″E
- Country: Iran
- Province: Khuzestan
- County: Dezpart
- District: Qarun
- Capital: Bar Aftab-e Fazl

Population (2016)
  - Total: 4,886
- Time zone: UTC+3:30 (IRST)

Donbaleh Rud-e Jonubi Rural District (Persian: دهستان دنباله‌رود جنوبی) is in Qarun District of Dezpart County, Khuzestan province, Iran. Its capital is the village of Bar Aftab-e Fazl. The previous capital of the rural district was the village of Deh Now-ye Kizavak, which was absorbed into the village of Mallah.

== Demographics ==
=== Population ===
At the time of the 2006 National Census, the rural district's population (as part of Dehdez District (Note: Renamed the Central District of Dezpart County) of Izeh County) was 6,908 in 1,261 households. There were 5,920 inhabitants in 1,267 households at the following census of 2011. The 2016 census measured the population of the rural district as 4,886 in 1,181 households. The most populous of its 38 villages was Chaman, with 567 people.

In 2021, the district was separated from the county in the establishment of Dezpart County and renamed the Central District. The rural district was separated from the district in the formation of Qarun District.
