= Dehdez Rural District =

Rural district in Khuzestan province, Iran

Dehdez Rural District Persian: دهستان دهدز
- Rural District
- Location within Iran
- Coordinates: 31°42′18″N 50°19′13″E
- Country: Iran
- Province: Khuzestan
- County: Dezpart
- District: Central
- Capital: Deh Kohneh-ye Muzarm

Population (2016)
  - Total: 5,556
- Time zone: UTC+3:30 (IRST)

Dehdez Rural District (Persian: دهستان دهدز) is in the Central District (Note: Formerly Dehdez District of Izeh County) of Dezpart County, Khuzestan province, Iran. Its capital is the village of Deh Kohneh-ye Muzarm. The rural district was previously administered from the city of Dehdez.

== Demographics ==
=== Population ===
At the time of the 2006 National Census, the rural district's population (as a part of Dehdez District (Note: Renamed the Central District of Dezpart County) of Izeh County) was 7,867 in 1,425 households. There were 6,777 inhabitants in 1,497 households at the following census of 2011. The 2016 census measured the population of the rural district as 5,556 in 1,459 households. The most populous of its 51 villages was Deh Kohneh-ye Muzarm, with 1,181 people.

In 2021, the district was separated from the county in the establishment of Dezpart County and renamed the Central District.
