= Margha Rural District =

Rural district in Khuzestan province, Iran

Margha Rural District Persian: دهستان مرغا
- Rural District
- Location within Iran
- Coordinates: 31°55′21″N 49°39′00″E
- Country: Iran
- Province: Khuzestan
- County: Izeh
- District: Central
- Capital: Cham Reyhan

Population (2016)
  - Total: 3,132
- Time zone: UTC+3:30 (IRST)

Margha Rural District (Persian: دهستان مرغا) is in the Central District of Izeh County, Khuzestan province, Iran. Its capital is the village of Cham Reyhan.

== Demographics ==
=== Population ===
At the time of the 2006 National Census, the rural district's population was 3,748 in 650 households. There were 3,463 inhabitants in 703 households at the following census of 2011. The 2016 census measured the population of the rural district as 3,132 in 749 households. The most populous of its 54 villages was Jazestan, with 361 people.
