= Dezpart County =

County in Khuzestan province, Iran

Dezpart County Persian: شهرستان دزپارت
- County
- Location of Dezpart County in Khuzestan province (right, pink)

- Location of Khuzestan province in Iran
- Coordinates: 31°41′N 50°14′E
- Country: Iran
- Province: Khuzestan
- Capital: Dehdez
- Districts: Central, Qarun
- Elevation: 1,580 m (5,180 ft)
- Time zone: UTC+3:30 (IRST)

Dezpart County (Persian: شهرستان دزپارت) is in Khuzestan province, Iran. Its capital is the city of Dehdez, whose population at the time of the 2016 National Census was 5,490 people in 1,312 households.

== History ==
In 2021, Dehdez District (Note: Renamed the Central District of Dezpart County) was separated from Izeh County in the establishment of Dezpart County and renamed the Central District. Donbaleh Rud-e Jonubi Rural District was separated from the district in the formation of Qarun District.

== Demographics ==
=== Administrative divisions ===
Dezpart County's administrative structure is shown in the following table.

Dezpart County
Administrative Divisions
Central District (Note: Formerly Dehdez District of Izeh County)
Dehdez RD
Donbaleh Rud-e Shomali RD (Note: Formerly Donbaleh Rud Rural District)
Dehdez (city)
Qarun District
Donbaleh Rud-e Jonubi RD
Shivand RD
RD = Rural District

== See also ==
Media related to Dezpart County at Wikimedia Commons
