= Donbaleh Rud-e Shomali Rural District =

Rural district in Khuzestan province, Iran

Donbaleh Rud-e Shomali Rural District Persian: دهستان دنباله‌رود شمالی
- Rural District
- Location within Iran
- Coordinates: 31°47′34″N 50°09′52″E
- Country: Iran
- Province: Khuzestan
- County: Dezpart
- District: Central
- Capital: Deh Kian

Population (2016)
  - Total: 3,419
- Time zone: UTC+3:30 (IRST)

Donbaleh Rud-e Shomali Rural District (Persian: دهستان دنباله‌رود شمالی) (Note: Formerly Donbaleh Rud Rural District) is in the Central District (Note: Formerly Dehdez District of Izeh County) of Dezpart County, Khuzestan province, Iran. Its capital is the village of Deh Kian. The previous capital of the rural district was the village of Bajul, and prior to that, the village of Bozorg Shivand.

== Demographics ==
=== Population ===
At the time of the 2006 National Census, the rural district's population (as part of Dehdez District (Note: Renamed the Central District of Dezpart County) of Izeh County) was 5,360 in 1,000 households. There were 3,865 inhabitants in 833 households at the following census of 2011. The 2016 census measured the population of the rural district as 3,419 in 810 households. The most populous of its 58 villages was Posht Asiab, with 384 people.

In 2021, the district was separated from the county in the establishment of Dezpart County and renamed the Central District.
