= Holayjan Rural District =

Rural district in Khuzestan province, Iran

Holayjan Rural District Persian: دهستان هلايجان
- Rural District
- Location within Iran
- Coordinates: 31°47′54″N 49°46′42″E
- Country: Iran
- Province: Khuzestan
- County: Izeh
- District: Central
- Capital: Chenarestan

Population (2016)
  - Total: 5,821
- Time zone: UTC+3:30 (IRST)

Holayjan Rural District (Persian: دهستان هلايجان) is in the Central District of Izeh County, Khuzestan province, Iran. Its capital is the village of Chenarestan.

== Demographics ==
=== Population ===
At the time of the 2006 National Census, the rural district's population was 7,435 in 1,362 households. There were 7,059 inhabitants in 1,581 households at the following census of 2011. The 2016 census measured the population of the rural district as 5,821 in 1,499 households. The most populous of its 78 villages was Chenarestan, with 521 people.
