= Howmeh-ye Sharqi Rural District (Izeh County) =

Rural district in Khuzestan province, Iran

Howmeh-ye Sharqi Rural District Persian: دهستان حومه شرقي
- Rural District
- Location within Iran
- Coordinates: 31°49′31″N 49°57′37″E
- Country: Iran
- Province: Khuzestan
- County: Izeh
- District: Central
- Capital: Kahbad-e Do

Population (2016)
  - Total: 20,897
- Time zone: UTC+3:30 (IRST)

Howmeh-ye Sharqi Rural District (Persian: دهستان حومه شرقي) is in the Central District of Izeh County, Khuzestan province, Iran. Its capital is the village of Kahbad-e Do. (Note: Also known as Kul-e Farah)

== Demographics ==
=== Population ===
At the time of the 2006 National Census, the rural district's population was 17,753 in 3,098 households. There were 20,119 inhabitants in 4,270 households at the following census of 2011. The 2016 census measured the population of the rural district as 20,897 in 4,960 households. The most populous of its 73 villages was Bard Gapi, with 3,318 people.
