= Central District (Dezpart County) =

District in Khuzestan province, Iran

Central District (Dezpart County) Persian: بخش مرکزی شهرستان دزپارت
- District
- Location within Iran
- Coordinates: 31°44′23″N 50°14′34″E
- Country: Iran
- Province: Khuzestan
- County: Dezpart
- Capital: Dehdez
- Time zone: UTC+3:30 (IRST)

The Central District of Dezpart County (Persian: بخش مرکزی شهرستان دزپارت) (Note: Formerly Dehdez District (بخش دهدز) of Izeh County) is in Khuzestan province, Iran. Its capital is the city of Dehdez.

== History ==
In 2021, Dehdez District (Note: Renamed the Central District of Dezpart County) was separated from Izeh County in the establishment of Dezpart County and renamed the Central District. Donbaleh Rud-e Jonubi Rural District was separated from the district in the formation of Qarun District.

== Demographics ==
=== Population ===
At the time of the 2006 National Census, the district's population (as a part of Izeh County) was 23,745 in 4,337 households. The following census in 2011 counted 21,482 people in 4,591 households. The 2016 census measured the population of the district as 19,351 inhabitants in 4,762 households.

Central District (Dezpart County) (Note: As Dehdez District of Izeh County at the 2006, 2011, and 2016 censuses)
Administrative Divisions	2006	2011	2016
Dehdez RD	7,867	6,777	5,556
Donbaleh Rud-e Jonubi RD (Note: Transferred to Qarun District after the 2016 census)	6,908	5,920	4,886
Donbaleh Rud-e Shomali RD (Note: Formerly Donbaleh Rud Rural District)	5,360	3,865	3,419
Dehdez (city)	3,610	4,920	5,490
Total	23,745	21,482	19,351
RD: Rural District
