= Central District (Izeh County) =

District in Khuzestan province, Iran

Central District (Izeh County) Persian: بخش مرکزی شهرستان ایذه
- District
- Location within Iran
- Coordinates: 32°00′00″N 49°44′07″E
- Country: Iran
- Province: Khuzestan
- County: Izeh
- Capital: Izeh

Population (2016)
  - Total: 166,567
- Time zone: UTC+3:30 (IRST)

The Central District of Izeh County (Persian: بخش مرکزی شهرستان ایذه) is in Khuzestan province, Iran. Its capital is the city of Izeh.

== History ==
After the 2006 National Census, Susan-e Gharbi and Susan-e Sharqi Rural Districts were separated from the district in the formation of Susan District.

== Demographics ==
=== Population ===
At the time of the 2006 census, the district's population was 169,765 in 31,786 households. The following census in 2011 counted 166,920 people in 37,597 households. The 2016 census measured the population of the district as 166,567 inhabitants in 41,278 households.

=== Administrative divisions ===
Central District (Izeh County) Population
Administrative Divisions	2006	2011	2016
Holayjan RD	7,435	7,059	5,821
Howmeh-ye Gharbi RD	8,813	8,118	7,711
Howmeh-ye Sharqi RD	17,753	20,119	20,897
Margha RD	3,748	3,463	3,132
Pian RD	11,782	11,068	9,607
Susan-e Gharbi RD (Note: Transferred to Susan District)	11,022		
Susan-e Sharqi RD	5,517		
Izeh (city)	103,695	117,093	119,399
Total	169,765	166,920	166,567
RD = Rural District
