= Izeh County =

County in Khuzestan province, Iran

Izeh County Persian: شهرستان ایذه
- County
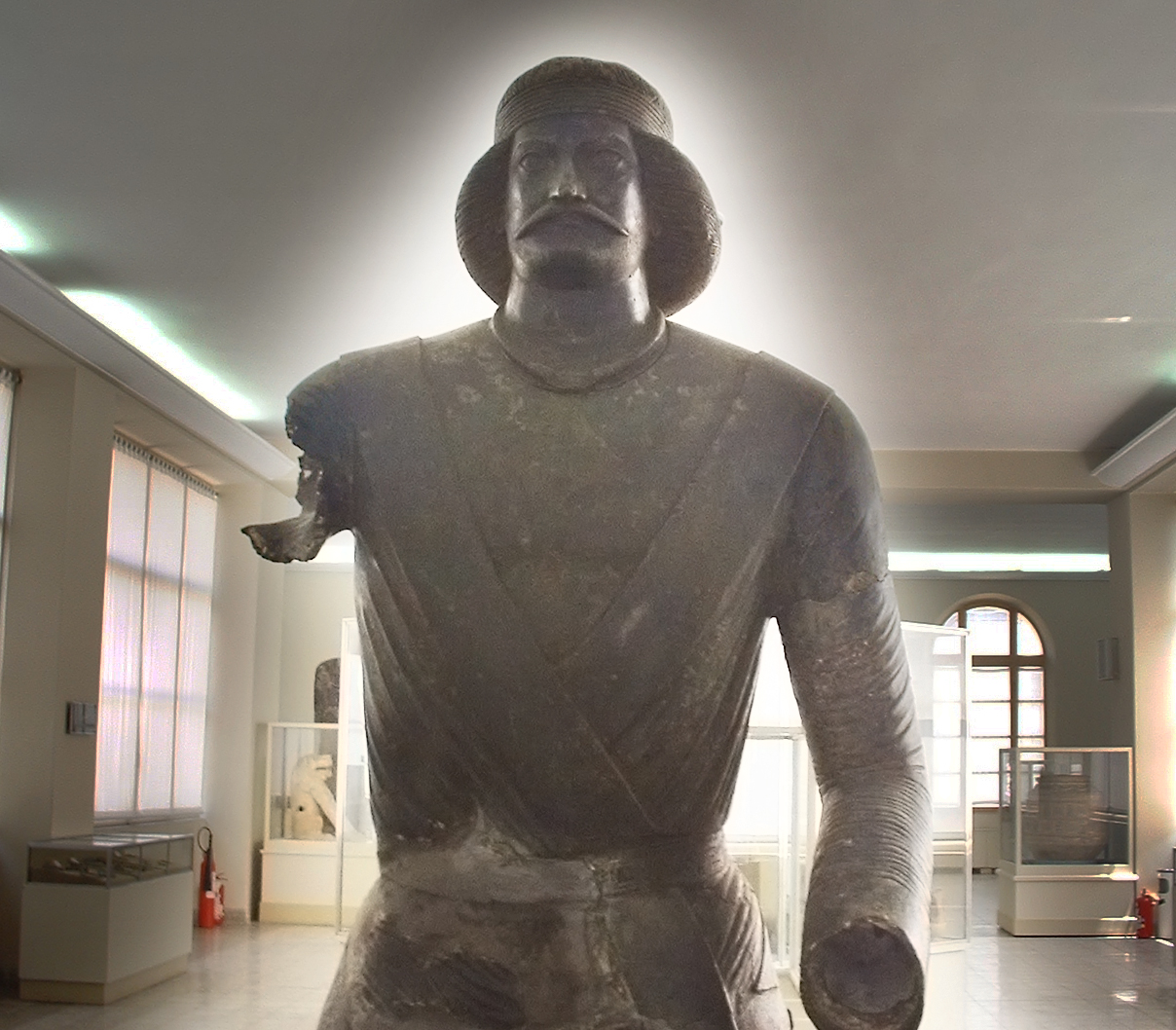
- Bronze statue of Parthian period unearthed in Izeh County

- Location of Izeh County in Khuzestan Province (top right, green)

- Location of Khuzestan Province in Iran
- Coordinates: 32°00′N 49°55′E
- Country: Iran
- Province: Khuzestan
- Capital: Izeh
- Districts: Central, Susan

Population (2016)
  - Total: 198,871
- Time zone: UTC+3:30 (IRST)

Izeh County (Persian: شهرستان ایذه) is in Khuzestan Province, Iran. Its capital is the city of Izeh.

== History ==
After the 2006 National Census, Susan-e Gharbi and Susan-e Sharqi Rural Districts were separated from the Central District in the formation of Susan District.

In 2021, Dehdez District (Note: Renamed the Central District of Dezpart County) was separated from the county in the establishment of Dezpart County.

== Demographics ==
=== Ethnicity ===
The vast majority of its population is from the Bakhtiari tribe, one of the largest in Iran.

=== Population ===
At the time of the 2006 census, the county's population was 193,510 in 36,123 households. The following census in 2011 counted 203,621 people in 45,090 households. The 2016 census measured the population of the county as 198,871 in 48,682 households.

=== Administrative divisions ===
Izeh County's population history and administrative structure over three consecutive censuses are shown in the following table.

Izeh County Population
Administrative Divisions	2006	2011	2016
Central District	169,765	166,920	166,567
Holayjan RD	7,435	7,059	5,821
Howmeh-ye Gharbi RD	8,813	8,118	7,711
Howmeh-ye Sharqi RD	17,753	20,119	20,897
Margha RD	3,748	3,463	3,132
Pian RD	11,782	11,068	9,607
Susan-e Gharbi RD	11,022		
Susan-e Sharqi RD	5,517		
Izeh (city)	103,695	117,093	119,399
Dehdez District (Note: Transferred to Dezpart County)	23,745	21,482	19,351
Dehdez RD	7,867	6,777	5,556
Donbaleh Rud-e Jonubi RD	6,908	5,920	4,886
Donbaleh Rud-e Shomali RD (Note: Formerly Donbaleh Rud Rural District)	5,360	3,865	3,419
Dehdez (city)	3,610	4,920	5,490
Susan District		15,192	12,953
Susan-e Gharbi RD		10,117	8,423
Susan-e Sharqi RD		5,075	4,530
Total	193,510	203,621	198,871
RD = Rural District

== Geography and climate ==
Izeh County is the highest county in Khuzestan province, with an average elevation exceeding 1,000 meters. Its climate differs from the rest of the province, being cooler and more humid. Annual rainfall ranges from 580–740 mm in Margha Station to over 750 mm in the forested valleys near Dehdez.

=== Tourism ===
Izeh County is a major hub for ecotourism in Khuzestan, attracting the highest number of visitors among the province's counties.

The statue of the Parthian nobleman discovered in the Izeh region, often referred to as the "Shami man," is a notable artifact associated with the Parthian period. The statue is celebrated for its craftsmanship, reflecting the artistry and cultural influences of the time. The figure, possibly representing a Parthian aristocrat or a deity, provides insight into the attire and aesthetic sensibilities of the era.

== See also ==
Media related to Izeh County at Wikimedia Commons
