= Eshkaft-e Salman =

Cave and archaeological site in Iran

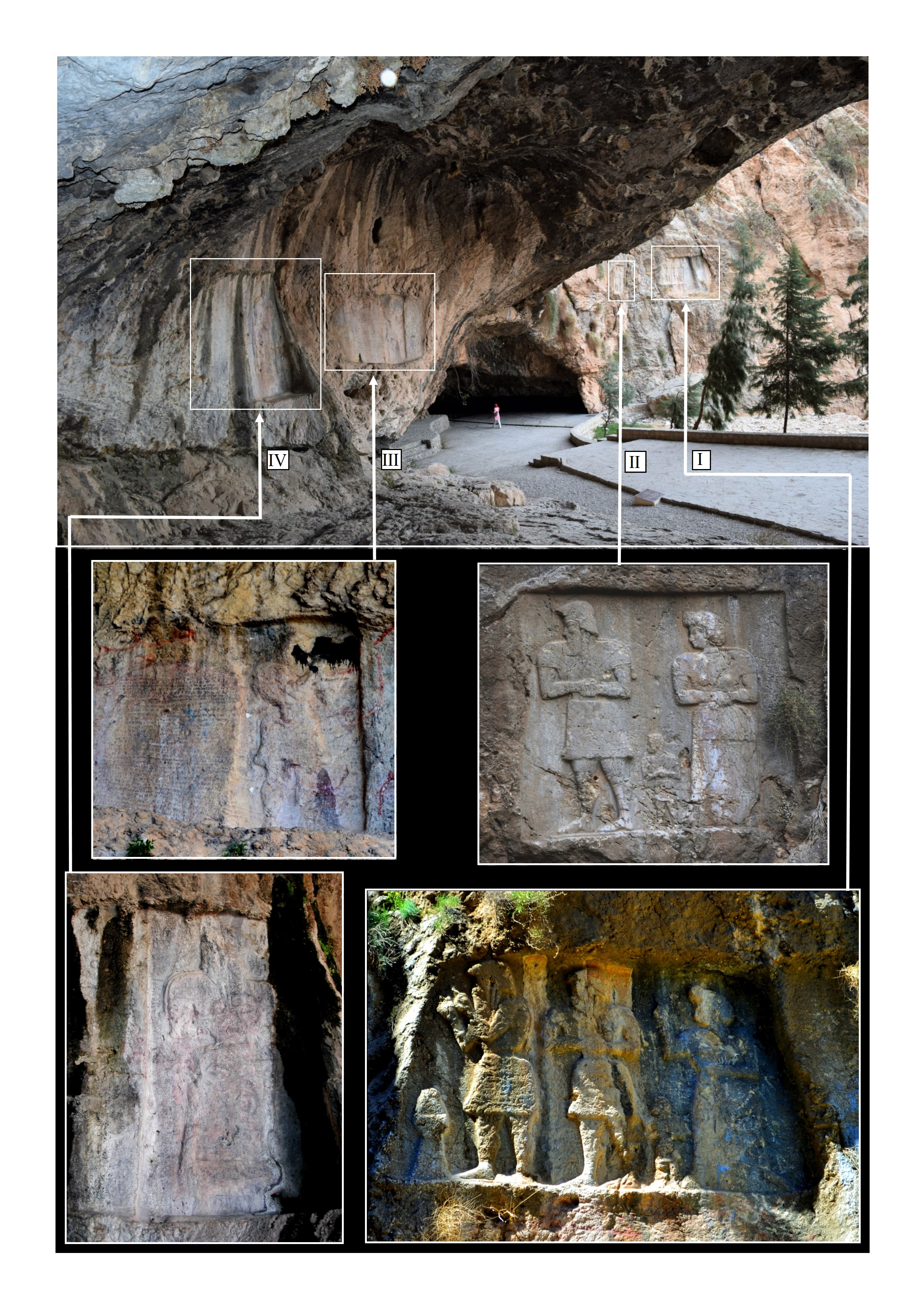
- View of Shekaft-e Salman with location of four Elamite Reliefs (J. Alvarez-Mon)

- Location within Iran Location within Near East
- 31°49′07″N 49°50′59″E
- Location: Izeh, Khuzestan province, Iran

Eshkaft-e Salman (Persian: اشکفت سلمان), also spelled Shekaft-e Salman or Eshkofte Salman, is an archaeological site in the Khuzestan province of Iran.

== Location ==
On the southwest side of the valley, 2.5 km from the town center of Izeh, southwest Iran, is the “romantic grotto” of Shekaft-e Salman (“Solomon’s Cave”) where a waterfall cascades seasonally over a high cliff-face, passing across the entrance to a natural cave below. Its waters merge with the spring water flowing out of the cave.

Four reliefs, Shekaft-e Salman (SSI-IV), were carved inside and to the right of the mouth of the cave. Similarities with inscribed brick panels at Susa advocate a 12th-century BC date for the first two reliefs (SSI and SS II), depicting royal families and probably carved in connection with cultic activities pursued by the Shutrukid dynasty in the open-air highland sanctuaries.

== Description ==
=== Shekaft-e Salman I (12th century and 11th–7th century BC) ===
(H. ca. 1.9 m w. 3.30 m/2.60 m; 12th and 11th-7th centuries BC). Carved inside a rectangular panel about 8.5 m above ground level, SSI depicts two men, a boy, and a woman standing in profile oriented toward the cave making worship gestures before a fire stand. It seems that the original panel, which dates to around the 12th century, had shown only the royal family (Male B, Boy, and Female) and that the fire stand and the man closest to it (Male A) were 11th–7th century additions. A poorly preserved Elamite inscription added to the relief in the 7th–6th century BC by Hanni, kutur (caretaker, protector, ruler) of Ayapir extends over the lower part of the relief. The first man in the group (Male A) raises the arms in front, flexed at the elbow. The hands are closed into a fist, index fingers extended. He has a long beard, a pair of long side-locks ending in a curl, a “visor” hairstyle, and a long braid that extends down the back and ends in a curl at waist level. His garment is short-sleeved, belted at the waist, and has a bell-shaped, knee-length skirt. His feet are bare. The second man (Male B) clasps his hands together at the waist. He has a similar garment, face, hairstyle and physique to the previous. The boy behind him wears a comparable garment and adopts the same clasped-hands gesture. Last in line is the woman, who holds the right arm flexed at the elbow with hand raised and index finger extended in an upward-pointing gesture. The left hand is held in front of the waist and may be grasping a folded textile. The short-sleeved garment shirt molds over small breasts and the long, bell-shaped, floor-length skirt covers the feet and flares into two triangular tips at the hemline. A small band at the forehead follows the line of the hair, which extends upward in a large mass and bulges at the back. The face is rather round, with pronounced cheeks, small mouth and a double chin. The neck is adorned by a necklace with an extension (or a braid?) along the line of the arm (like the female in SSII below).

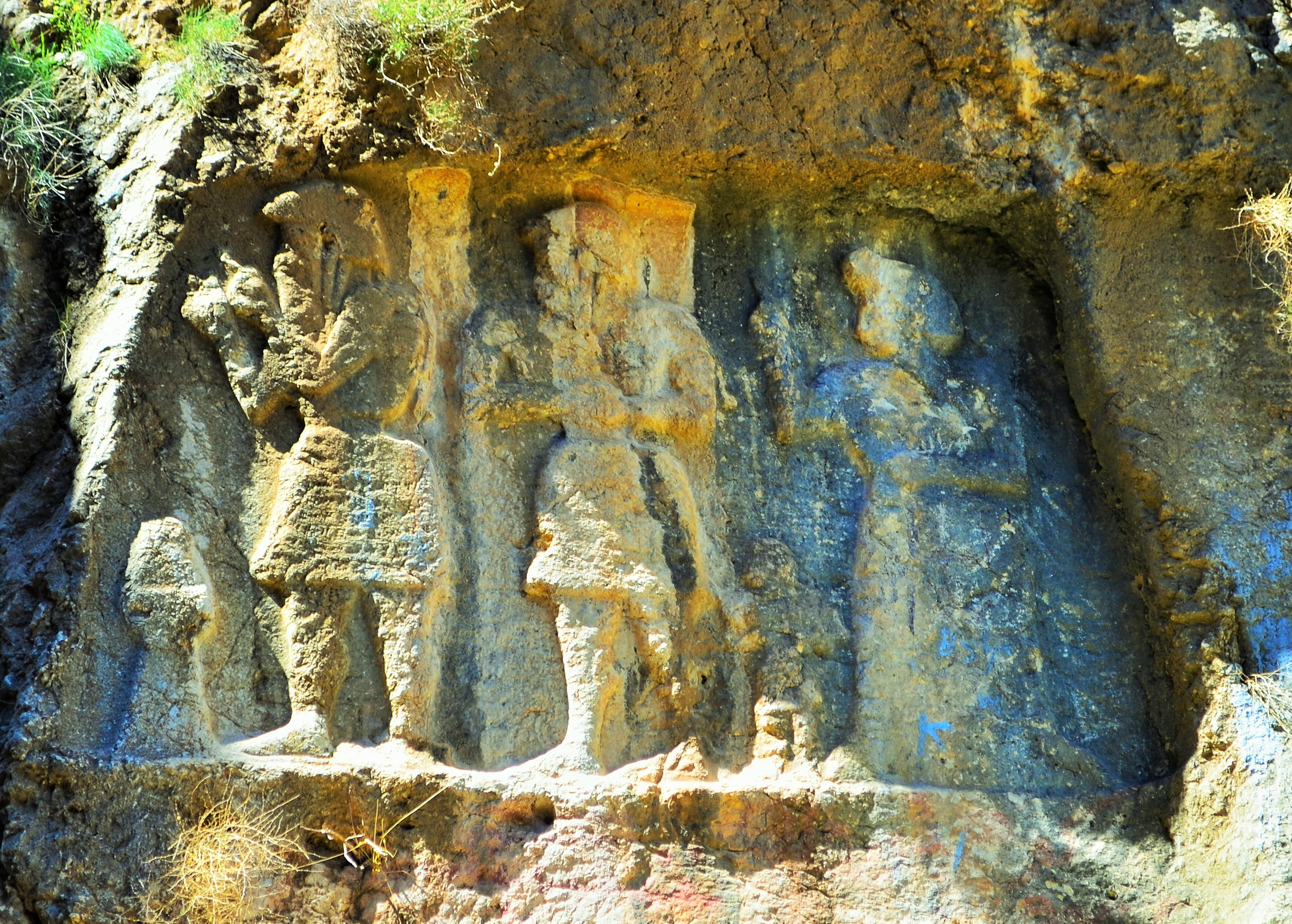
Relief of Shekaft-e Salman I (J. Alvarez-Mon)

=== Shekaft-e Salman II (12th century BC) ===
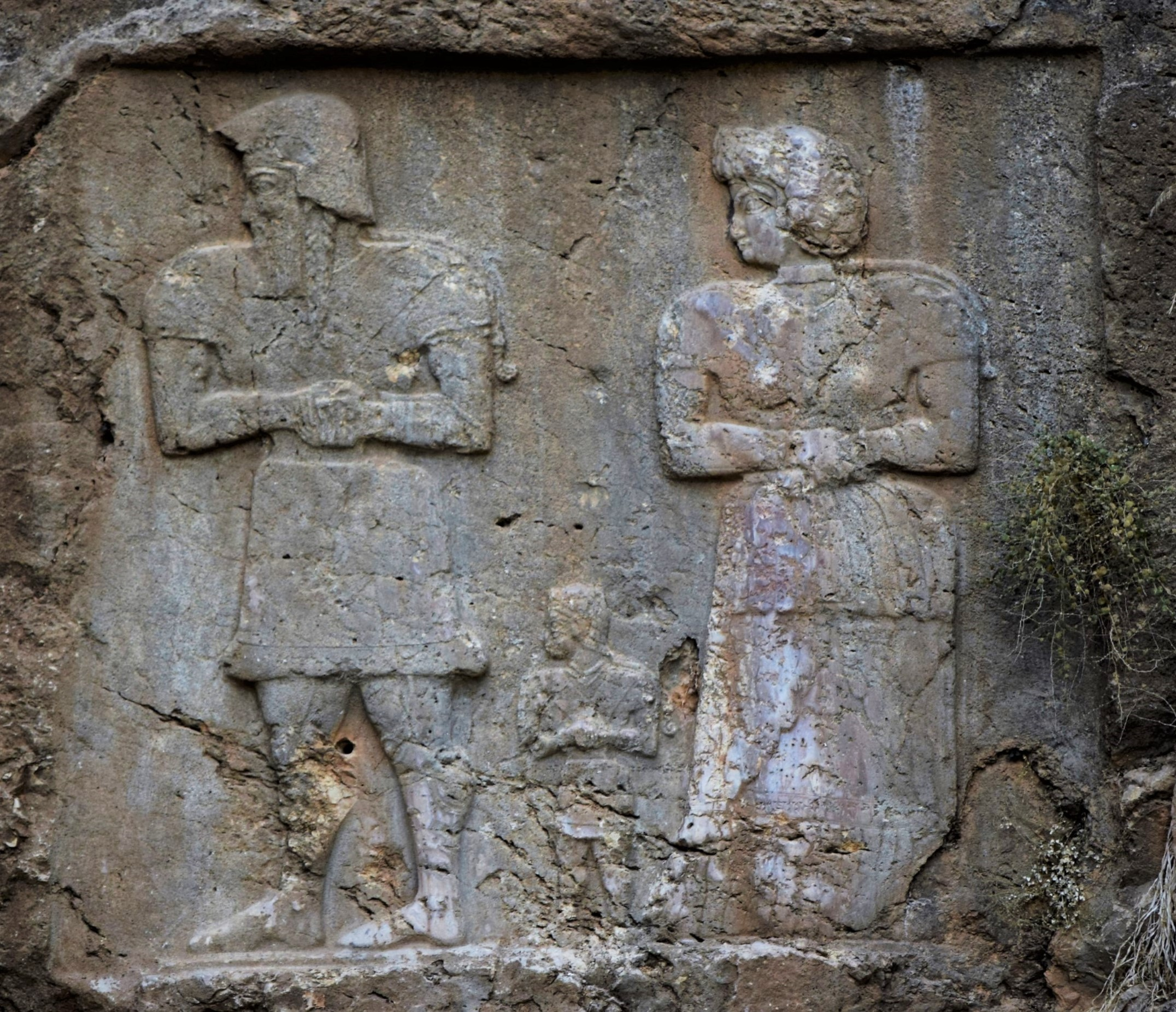
Relief of Shekaft-e Salman II (J. ALvarez-Mon)

(H. 1.92 m, w. 2.23 m; 12th century BC). Carved in a rectangular panel at around the same height (at least 8 m) as SSI, but closer to the cave. It depicts a man, a boy, and a woman standing oriented toward the cave. The man is on a low pedestal in front clasping his hands at the waist. A band above the left wrist extends along the length of the forearm to the elbow (perhaps straps related to archery paraphernalia). The garment has short sleeves and long fringes crossing the chest in a V-shape. A curved line at the neck could indicate an undergarment or a necklace. The narrow waist is girded by a wide band and the bell-shaped skirt flares out above the knee into a fringed hemline. The “visor” hairstyle covers the top of the ear and a narrow band runs along the forehead. A pair of chest-length, braided side-locks narrow toward the end where they curl upward in opposite directions and another long braid runs along the left shoulder, ending in a curl above the elbow. The boy wears the same style of garment, headdress and back-braid and performs the same gesture. Behind him, the woman grips her left wrist with her right hand. The left hand may hold a folded textile. The definition of small breasts with nipples suggests a garment shirt made of fine fabric. The bell-shaped skirt falls from the narrow waist to the ground, covering the feet. It is divided into a sequence of three fringes: an upper row of long fringing, a middle row of wavy fringing that decreases in length toward the center creating a triangular space, and a bottom row of fringing composed of fifteen long tassels. The well-preserved face is round, with a double chin, a small, slightly smiling mouth, a thick monobrow and a large eye. The hair sweeps upward at the front, covers the ear, and bulges in a bun-like mass at the back. The neck is encircled by a choker, which may be fixed by a clasp with a long extension (a braid?) ending in a curl. A narrow band runs along the forehead at the hairline and down toward a figure-eight shape earring.

Three captions were added to this relief by Hanni of Ayapir in the 7th–6th centuries BC. One of them (IIA), now unreadable, was inscribed over the fringe of the adult male's skirt. The other two, one on the boy's skirt (IIB) and the other above the fringed hemline of the female's long dress (IIC), were read by Hinz, respectively, as Zashehshi(?), daughter(?) of Hanni and Amatema, wife or daughter (?) of Hanni.

In certain details these depictions of royal couples at Shekaft-e Salman are strikingly similar to the fragmentary couple from a royal tabernacle at Susa. The closest parallels are in the ruler's distinguishing pair of long, braided side-locks that curl at the ends, the short-sleeved garment with fringes crossing the chest in a V-shape, the wide shoulders, and the clasped-hands gesture. Parallels in the queens are the small breasts and short-sleeved garment shirt. At the same time, there are notable divergences. On the brick panels at Susa, no traces of children were specifically noted (bearing in mind, however, that the bricks were very fragmentary); the king wears a long rather than short garment, shoes, and has no sign of arm bands; the queen has a palmette clasp on the sleeve, no braid (?) along the arm, an open right hand (rather than gripping the left wrist or pointing the index finger), and a slightly shorter garment with feet visible below. Though not identical, the similarities with the inscribed brick panels at Susa advocate a 12th-century BC date for the SSI and II. Shilhak-Inshushinak was apparently keen on royal family portraits, telling us directly that he commissioned a stele in stone depicting himself with Nahhunte-Utu and “our family”.

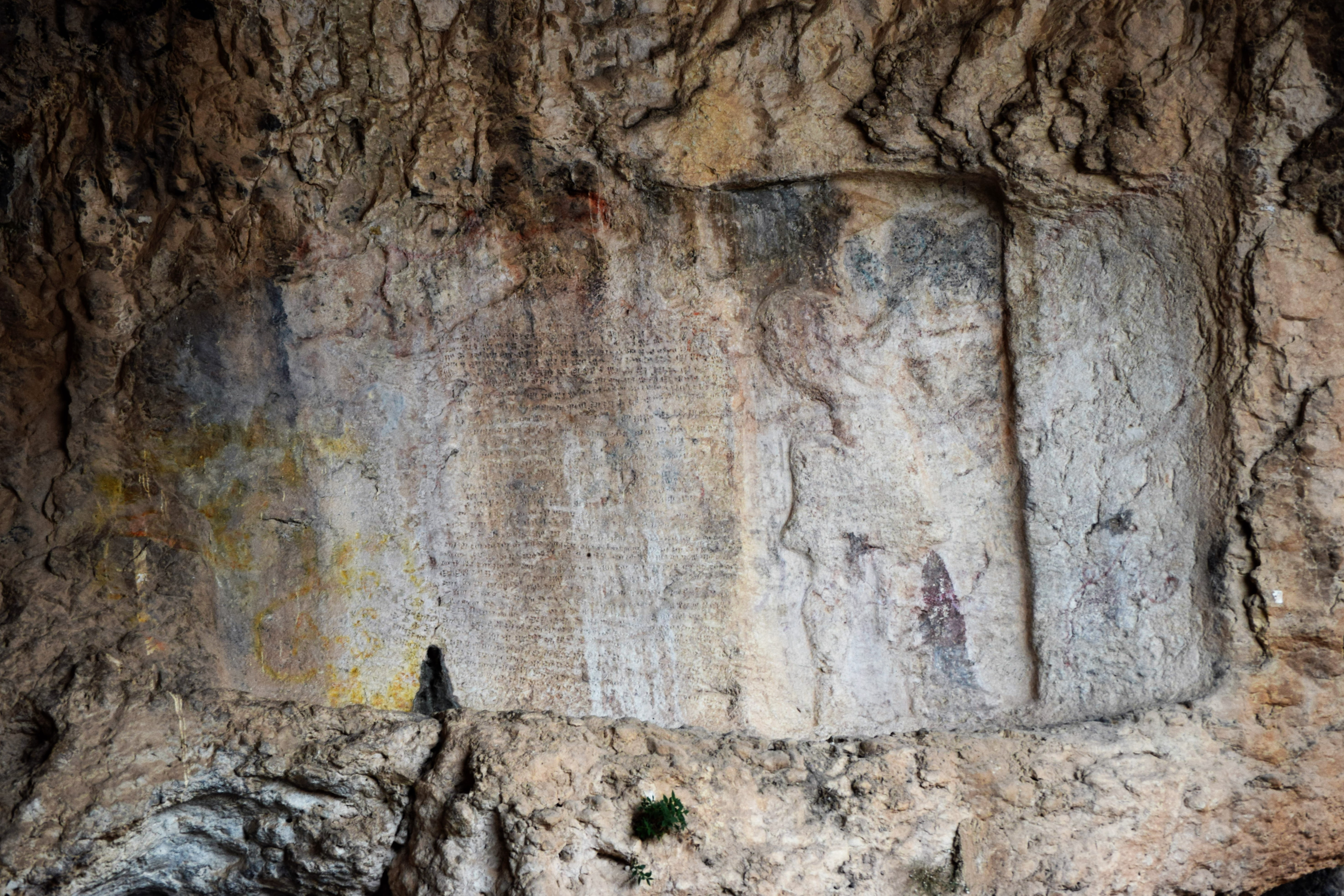
Relief of Shekaft-e Salman III (J. Alvarez-Mon)

=== Shekaft-e Salman III (11th–7th century BC) ===
(H. 2.35 m x 4.45 m). Relief carved inside the mouth of the cave depicting a man standing in profile oriented toward its interior. He wears a short-sleeved garment with a short bell-shaped skirt and raises the hands in front of the face with index fingers extended in a pointing gesture. A long inscription of Hanni was added to his right and a large, blank panel to his left. The date of this relief could be as early as the 11th century and as late as the 7th century.

=== Shekaft-e Salman IV (12th–11th century BC) ===
(H. 2.30 m x 1.25 m). Relief carved inside the mouth of the cave depicting a man standing on a small pedestal oriented toward the cave's interior. He wears a short-sleeved garment with a long skirt and clasps his hands together at the waist. A 12th to 11th century BC date seems most appropriate for this relief.

=== Commentary ===
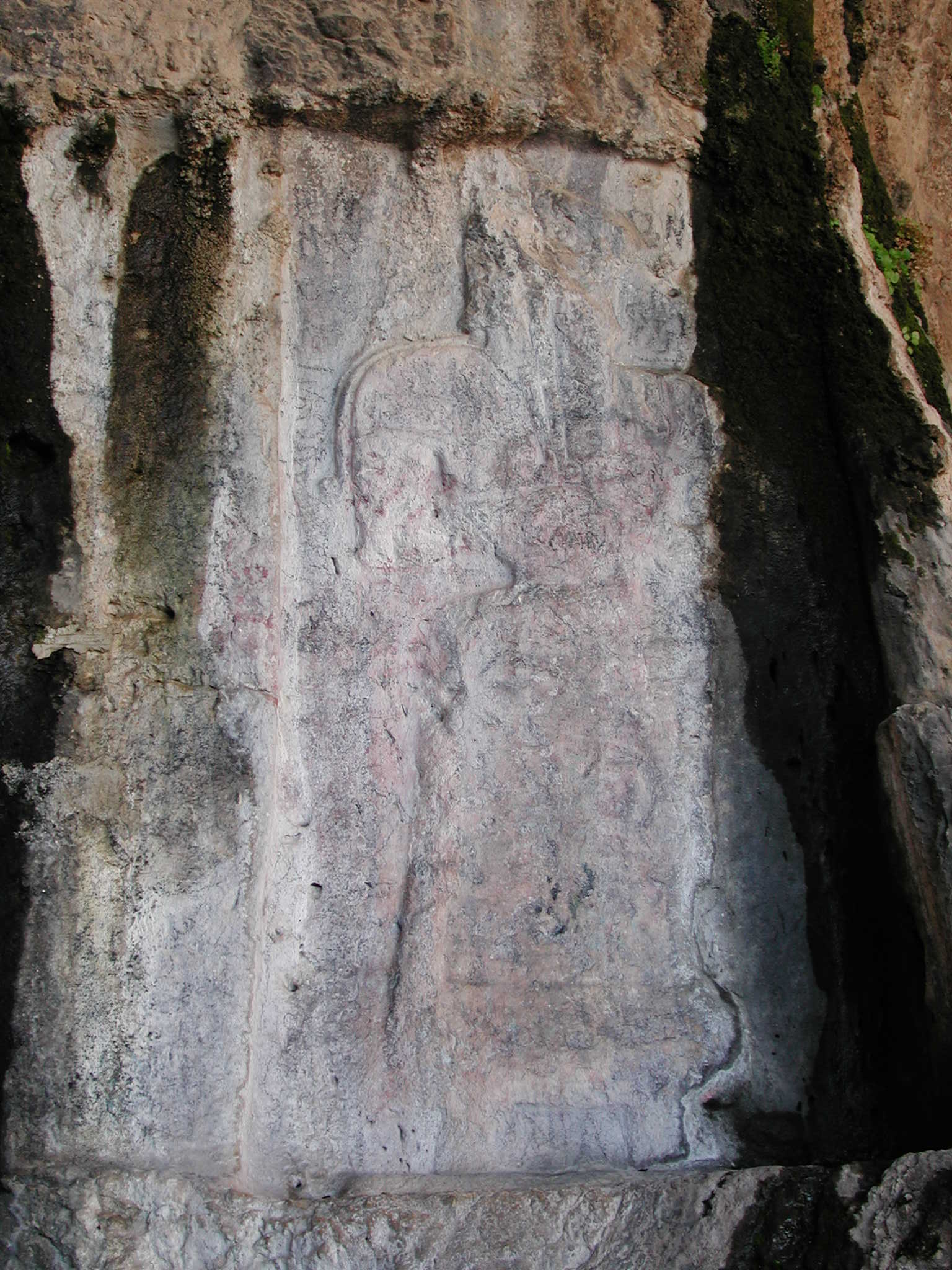
Relief of Shekaft-e Salman IV (J. Alvarez-Mon)

The artistic initiatives of the Shutrukids left a distinctive imprint on subsequent artistic manifestations at both Susa and in the highlands of Elam, especially with respect to the representation of royalty. Much like royal inscriptions, official elite art was by nature archaizing and, consequently, besides honoring tradition and keeping the memory of ancestors alive, the ability to replicate the masterpieces of the past must have been a mark of artistic excellence. An example that may demonstrate this principle is the later addition of the ruler in SSI (Male A), which has much in common with both old-fashioned religious art from the sukkalmah period and with Shutrukid elite imagery, and yet some details suggest a possible later manufacture (perhaps in the Neo-Elamite period).

== Gallery ==
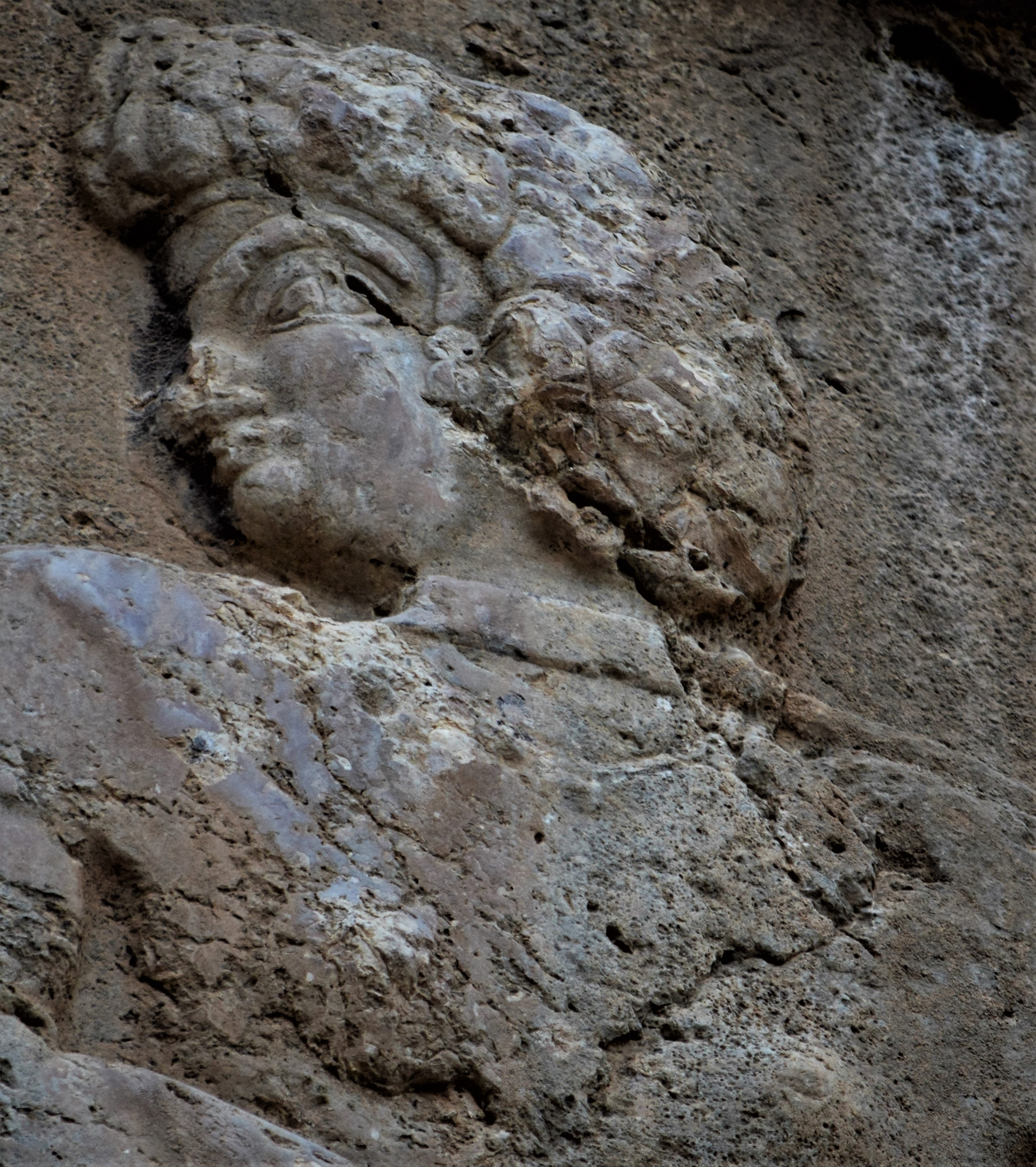
Detail of Elamite Queen exhibited in Shekaft-e Salman II, 12th century BC (J. Alvarez-Mon)

== See also ==
- Sarpol-e Zahab
- Kul-e Farah (Elamite Reliefs)
- Kurangun (Elamite Reliefs)
- Naqsh-e Rostam (Elamite Reliefs)
