= Izeh =

City in Khuzestan province, Iran

Izeh Persian: ايذه
- City
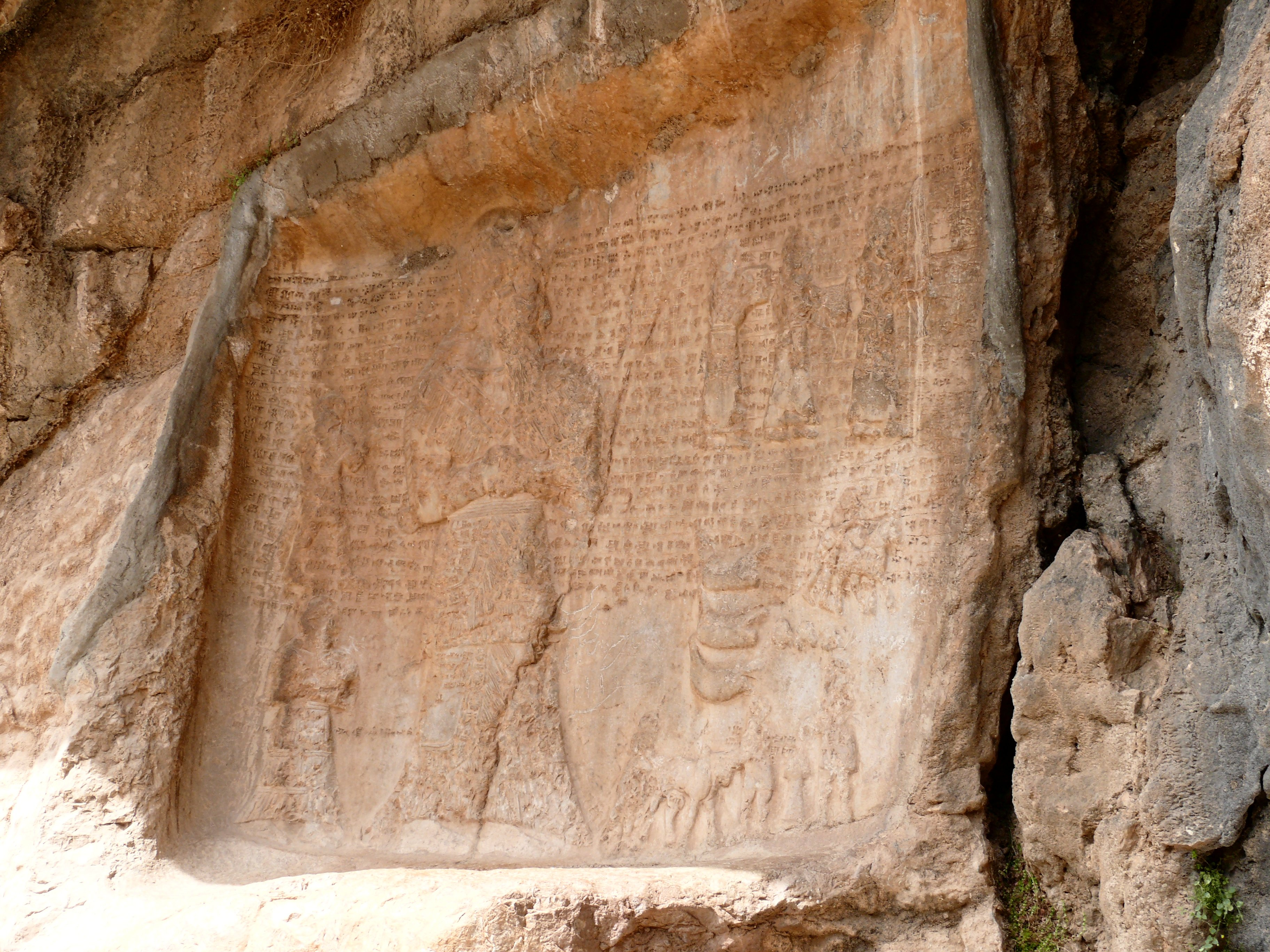
- Kul-e Farah

- Location within Iran
- Coordinates: 31°49′45″N 49°52′07″E
- Country: Iran
- Province: Khuzestan
- County: Izeh
- District: Central

Population (2016)
  - Total: 119,399
- Time zone: UTC+3:30 (IRST)
- Website: izeh24.ir

Izeh (Persian: ايذه) (Note: Also romanized as Eazeh and Īz̄eh; also known as Idhaj, Izaj, Malāmir, Malemir, and Malmir) (Luri : malemir/مالمیر) is a city in the Central District of Izeh County, Khuzestan province, Iran, serving as capital of both the county and the district.

Izeh has mines of rocks and minerals. It is famous for its dam and ancient monuments that are located in Kul-e Farah, Eshkaft-e Salman, Khongazhdar, Tagh-e Tavileh, Shir-e Sangi (Stone Lion cemetery), Shahsavar relief, Khong-e Kamalvand, Khong-e Azhdar, Khong-e Yaralivand, Ghalesard village (Qalesard), and Sheyvand relief.

== Demographics ==
=== Language ===
The majority of the population in Izeh speaks the Persian Bakhtiari dialect of the Luri language.

=== Population ===
Population history
Year	Pop.	±%
1956	1,983	—
1966	5,115	+157.9%
1976	10,257	+100.5%
1986	46,042	+348.9%
1991	64,072	+39.2%
1996	81,288	+26.9%
2006	103,695	+27.6%
2011	117,093	+12.9%
2016	119,399	+2.0%

At the time of the 2006 National Census, the city's population was 103,695 in 20,127 households. The following census in 2011 counted 117,093 people in 27,084 households. The 2016 census measured the population of the city as 119,399 people in 30,066 households.

== Climate ==
Izeh has a Hot-summer Mediterranean climate (Köppen Csa) with scorching, rainless summers and comfortable, somewhat wet winters with cold and often freezing mornings.

Climate data for Izeh (1993-2005)
Month	Jan	Feb	Mar	Apr	May	Jun	Jul	Aug	Sep	Oct	Nov	Dec	Year
Record high °C (°F)	24.0 (75.2)	24.0 (75.2)	29.0 (84.2)	35.4 (95.7)	42.0 (107.6)	46.0 (114.8)	46.6 (115.9)	45.8 (114.4)	42.6 (108.7)	37.8 (100.0)	32.0 (89.6)	27.2 (81.0)	46.6 (115.9)
Mean daily maximum °C (°F)	14.2 (57.6)	15.9 (60.6)	19.3 (66.7)	25.4 (77.7)	32.9 (91.2)	39.1 (102.4)	41.4 (106.5)	41.7 (107.1)	37.5 (99.5)	31.1 (88.0)	22.1 (71.8)	16.9 (62.4)	28.1 (82.6)
Daily mean °C (°F)	9.5 (49.1)	10.6 (51.1)	13.4 (56.1)	18.6 (65.5)	24.7 (76.5)	30.1 (86.2)	33.1 (91.6)	32.9 (91.2)	28.3 (82.9)	23.0 (73.4)	15.9 (60.6)	11.7 (53.1)	21.0 (69.8)
Mean daily minimum °C (°F)	4.8 (40.6)	5.2 (41.4)	7.5 (45.5)	11.7 (53.1)	16.4 (61.5)	21.0 (69.8)	24.8 (76.6)	24.1 (75.4)	19.2 (66.6)	14.9 (58.8)	9.7 (49.5)	6.6 (43.9)	13.8 (56.9)
Record low °C (°F)	−6.8 (19.8)	−3.8 (25.2)	−0.4 (31.3)	1.6 (34.9)	7.6 (45.7)	12.0 (53.6)	18.8 (65.8)	14.6 (58.3)	13.6 (56.5)	5.2 (41.4)	−1.2 (29.8)	−1.0 (30.2)	−6.8 (19.8)
Average rainfall mm (inches)	154.5 (6.08)	106.9 (4.21)	121.0 (4.76)	63.5 (2.50)	11.8 (0.46)	0.6 (0.02)	1.1 (0.04)	0.6 (0.02)	0.1 (0.00)	6.8 (0.27)	84.6 (3.33)	142.6 (5.61)	694.1 (27.3)
Average precipitation days (≥ 1 mm)	9.7	7.0	8.9	5.8	1.8	0.2	0.3	0.2	0.1	1.1	6.4	8.2	49.7
Average snowy days	0.2	0.2	0	0	0	0	0	0	0	0	0	0.1	0.5
Average relative humidity (%)	65	60	58	50	30	19	20	20	20	29	50	62	40
Mean monthly sunshine hours	177.3	187.4	211.8	239.3	313.0	365.6	354.7	351.4	323.3	280.0	212.3	177.0	3,193.1

== Notable people ==
- Iman Mobali Iranian retired football player and coach
- Pouya Dadmarz Iranian Greco-Roman wrestler
- Ramin Taheri Iranian Greco-Roman wrestler
- Aref Aghasi Iranian footballer
- Iman Mohammadi Iranian Greco-Roman wrestler
- Behrouz Jamshidi Iranian Greco-Roman wrestler
- Safdar Hosseini Iranian academic and politician
- Ali Landi student who saved the lives of two elderly women in a fire
- Ali Salehi Iranian poet and writer
- Mahmoud Rahmani Iranian documentary filmmaker
- Sajjad Kouchaki Iranian retired
- Barat Ghobadian

=== Archaeological Investigations in Izeh and Pion ===
Henry T. Wright led the first survey in Izeh in January 1976 and went back to field again in April. Wright and Richard Redding made a brief return visit to Izeh in October the same year. They found only an isolated déjeté scraper of Mousterian type. According to Wright’s report, six rock shelters had the larger blade tools that, in his opinion, made earlier UP occupation probable but majority of the rock shelter sites produced an EP assemblage with typical tools (except geometric microliths). Also several other possible UP and EP assemblages were reported by the same team in Dasht-e Gol and Iveh in northwest of Izeh as a result of the salvation project of Karun Dam 1 Basin. Only 30% of the Valley slopes of Izeh Plain were surveyed intensively during the field mission.

Mozhgan Jayez has surveyed the plain again and the regions in the vicinity of Izeh in the recent years and presented a preliminary analyses of the chipped stone assemblages recovered from the caves and rock shelters, found in the intensive archaeological surveys that led to discovery of Late Paleolithic to Early Neolithic sites. The lithic artifacts reveal evidence of repeated occupation spanning the Upper Paleolithic, Epipalaeolithic, and Early Neolithic periods. While distinguishing between the Upper Paleolithic and Epipalaeolithic assemblages is challenging due to shared tool types, the presence of pressure microblade cores and sickle elements clearly indicates Early Neolithic activity. The study highlights the long-term use of these cave sites and suggests that the apparent scarcity of Early Neolithic village settlements in the Izeh Plain may reflect preservation issues or distinct settlement patterns of the region's early farming communities.

During the most recent survey season, in addition to caves and rock shelters, 39 rock cut installations were recorded, specifically bedrock mortars and basins. These were mostly found in the outer areas of the sites. At this point, it is not possible to determine an exact date for these findings. They were discovered in open areas outside of the caves and rock shelters, so it is difficult to confirm if they are from the same time period as the prehistoric cultural remains.
