= Ali Landi =

Iranian boy who died after saving the lives of two elderly women in a fire (2007–2021)

- Born: 4 March 2007; Izeh, Khuzestan, Iran
- Died: 23 September 2021 (aged 14); Isfahan burn accident hospital
- Cause of death: Severe burn injuries
- Resting place: Izeh, Khuzestan
- Education: Ninth grade
- Known for: Saving the lives of two elderly women in a fire
- Title: Ali Landi, Martyr Ali Landi
- Parents: Davood Landi (father); Ziba Moosavi (mother)
- Family: Donya, Dina (sister)
- Awards: High Medal of Passive Defense Badge of sacrifice of the army of the Islamic Republic of Iran

Ali Landi (Martyr Ali Landi) (Persian: علی لندی, March 4, 2007, in Izeh – September 23, 2021, in Isfahan), was a fourteen-year-old Iranian teenager who died of a severe burn which he suffered when trying to rescue two elderly women from a building fire. The two women were saved but he suffered third degree burns, and finally died on the evening of September 23, 2021, due to an infection in blood and severe respiratory problems.

== Biography ==
Ali Landi was born on 4 March 2007 in Izeh, Khuzestan. At the time of the incident he was a ninth grade student.

== Reactions to his death ==
In response to Ali Landi's death, Ebrahim Raisi, the then President of Iran, said:

"The name of this dear teenager, who bravely and fiercely set fire to his heart to save the lives of two people, will be registered among the national heroes of this land and along with Hossein Fahmideh and Behnam Mohammadi.

The story of the self-sacrifice of this national hero must be narrated in the language of art and the pen of the people of culture and media in a historical way so that this model teenager can inspire the future generations of the children of Islamic Iran. Undoubtedly, every Iranian is proud to have such zealous children."

== Awarding the High Medal of Passive Defense ==
The head of the country's passive defense organization, Gholamreza Jalali, announced that the high passive defense medal was awarded to Ali Landi's family by the organization as the least work in praising this son of the school of self-sacrifice and bravery of Abolfazl Al-Abbas.

== Legacy ==
The National Headquarters of the Union of Students' Islamic Associations announced in a message: "The biography, the story of Ali Landi's martyrdom and honorable deed will be written in schoolbooks like the story of "the selfless farmer" in the minds of all students of this country; May it be a practical model for learning the behavior of great human beings". He said: "Ali was a great man whose story of self-sacrifice is instructive for everyone."

Kourosh Movadat, director general of education in Khuzestan, said that in coordination with the head of the Ministry of Education, it was decided that in coordination with the General Directorate of School Renovation in Khuzestan, an educational building named "Ali Landi" would be registered and we would suggest that the actions of this student be mentioned among the actions of national heroes

== Gallery ==
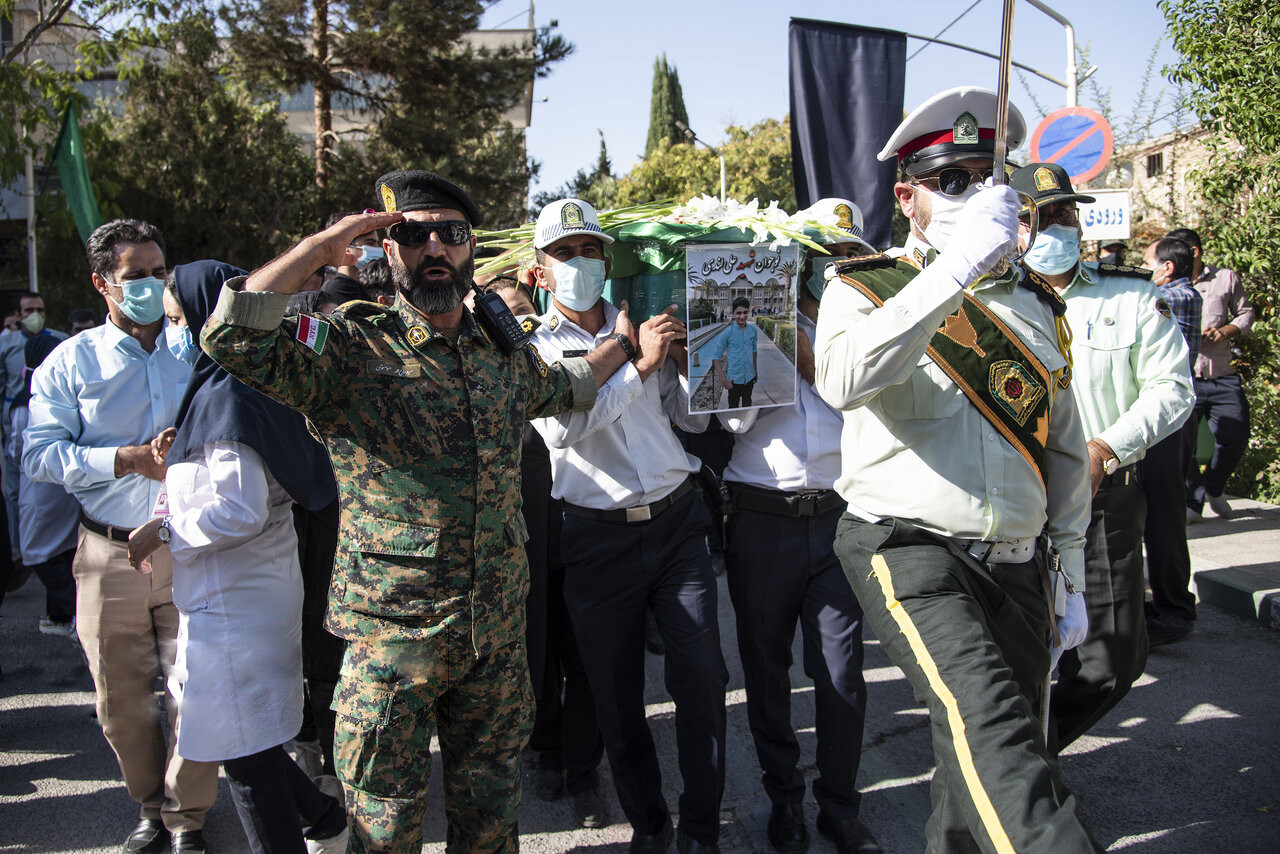
Ali Landi's funeral ceremonies in Isfahan, Iran – 24 September 2021

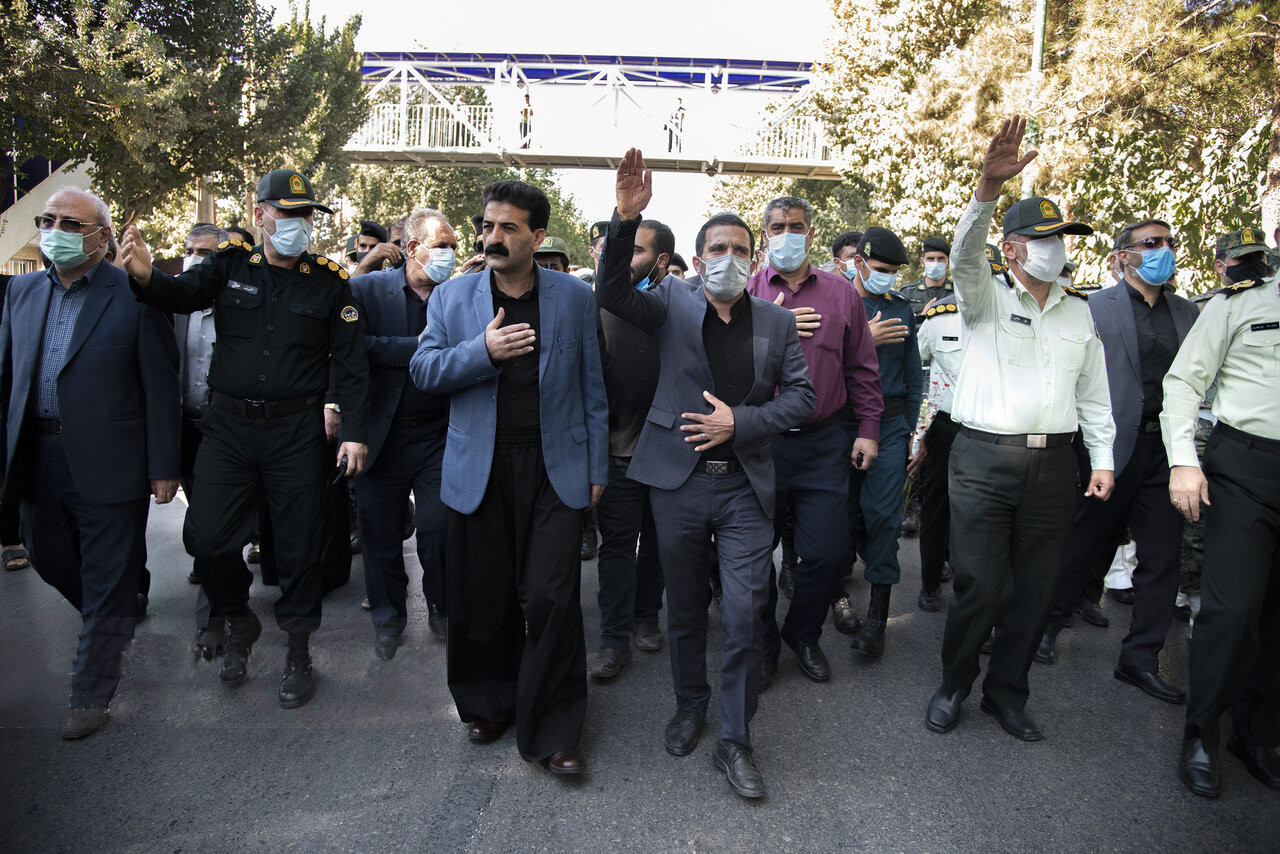
Ali Landi's funeral ceremonies in Isfahan, Iran – 24 September 2021

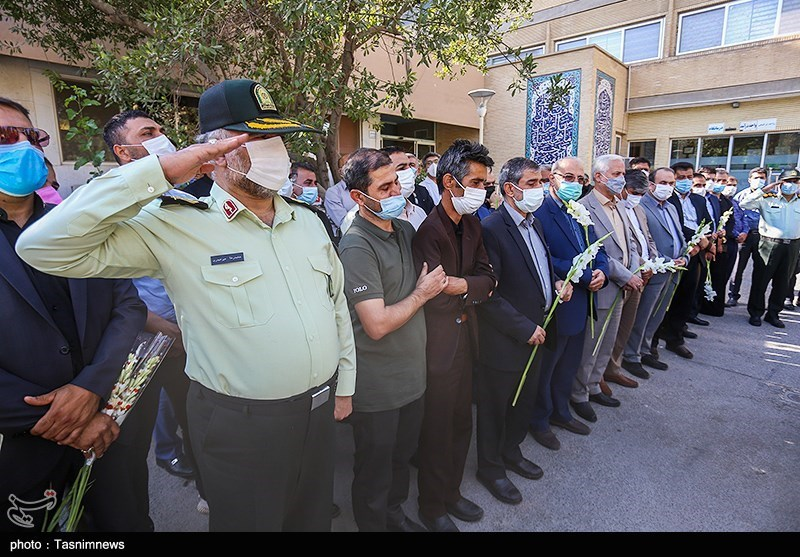
Ali Landi's funeral ceremonies in Isfahan, Iran – 24 September 2021

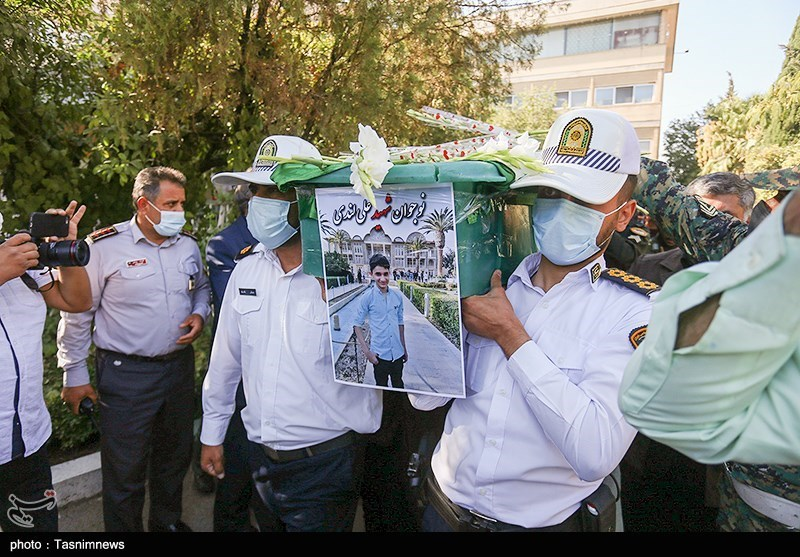
Ali Landi's funeral ceremonies in Isfahan, Iran – 24 September 2021

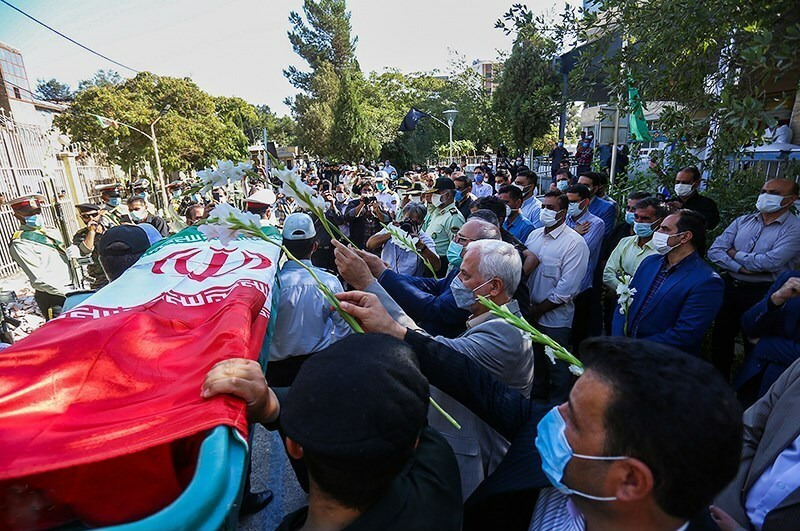
Ali Landi's funeral ceremonies in Isfahan, Iran – 24 September 2021
