= Mahmoud Rahmani =

- محمود رحمانی
- Born: December 18, 1979 (age 45)

Mahmoud Rāhmaní (also spelt Mahmood Rāhmaní, Persian: محمود رحمانی, born 1980) is an Iranian documentary filmmaker and screenwriter.

Born in Izeh, Iran, he has an honours degree from the First Professional Workshop of the Documentary and Experimental Film Center. After early experiences as a filmmaker, he began making documentary films in 2003. He made his debut, Gagola, in 2003 and gained the attention of Iranian critics. His concern for the ethnography and atmosphere of southern Iran is notable in his films.

He made his second short film "Oha" (dragon) in 2004. In 2005, he directed his first documentary Naft Sefid named after the city where oil was discovered. The film was well received in Iran and abroad and was shown at various international film festivals, including Amsterdam, Leipzig, and Milan.

His second documentary film "Zero Degree Orbit" was produced in 2007 and received more than 15 prizes at home and outside Iran. His third documentary "Molf-e Gand" was made in 2008 and contains the longest continuous take in Iranian Cinema. It received a Special Mention at the 7th Nuremberg International Human Rights Festival.

His documentary "My mother, Oak", a "poetic film about a loner and memories of a lost landscape and a condemnation of the ecological damage brought about by a dam project", received an honourable mention at the Munich Documentary Film Festival.

His first assistant in his new documentary is Belal Taheri.

== Filmography ==
- Gagola, 2003
- Oha, 2004
- Naft Sepid, 2005
- Zero Degree Orbit, 2007
- Molf-e Gand, 2008
- My mother, Oak, 2011

== See also ==
- Iranian New Wave
