= Tagh-e Tavileh =

Historic site in Iran

Coordinates: 31.835155°N 49.84969°E

- طاق طویله (Persian)
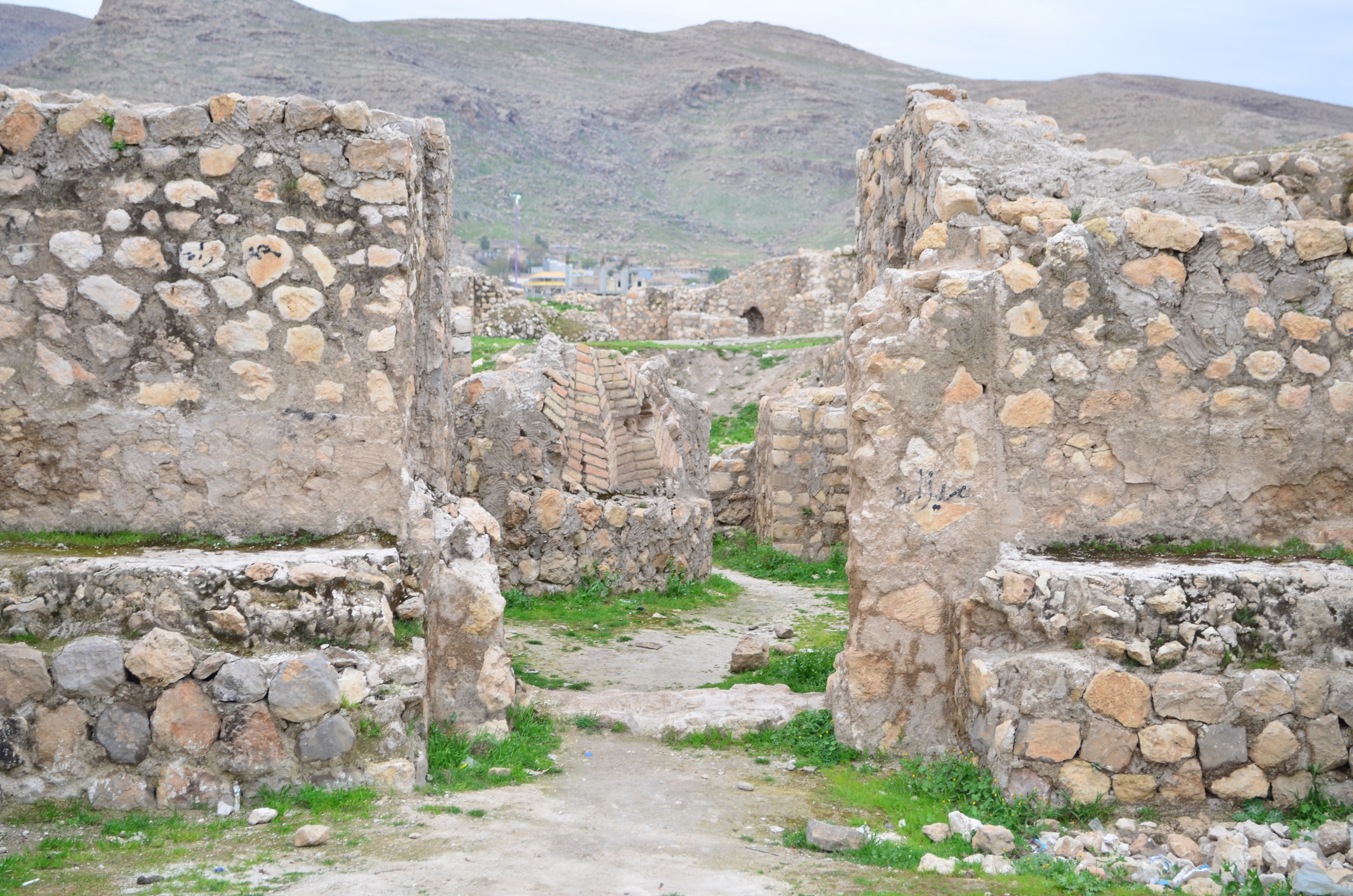
- Interactive map of Tagh-e Tavileh
- Location: near Izeh, Khuzestan province, Iran

Tagh-e Tavileh, or Taq-e Tavileh, is a historic site near Izeh in Iran. According to signage at the sight, Taq-e Tavileh dates to the end of Mohammad Rasool Alla "St." in Izeh and "Lor Atabakan the Greats". The site was discovered during excavations of the hill. It was constructed of stone and plaster with tilework and plasterwork adornment. Clay pipes moved water from Nurabad spring at the foot of Mount Alhak to the building.

== Gallery ==
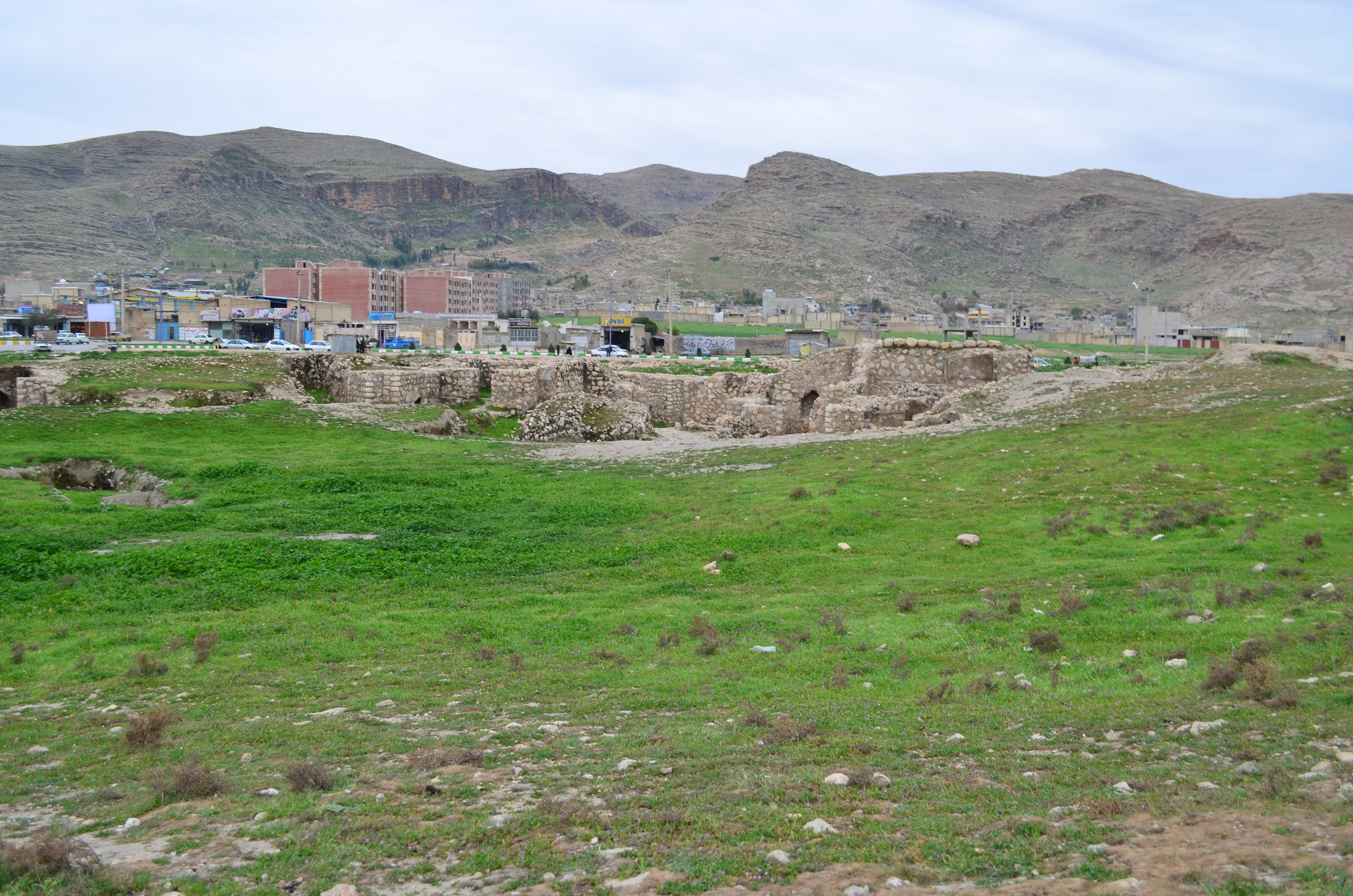

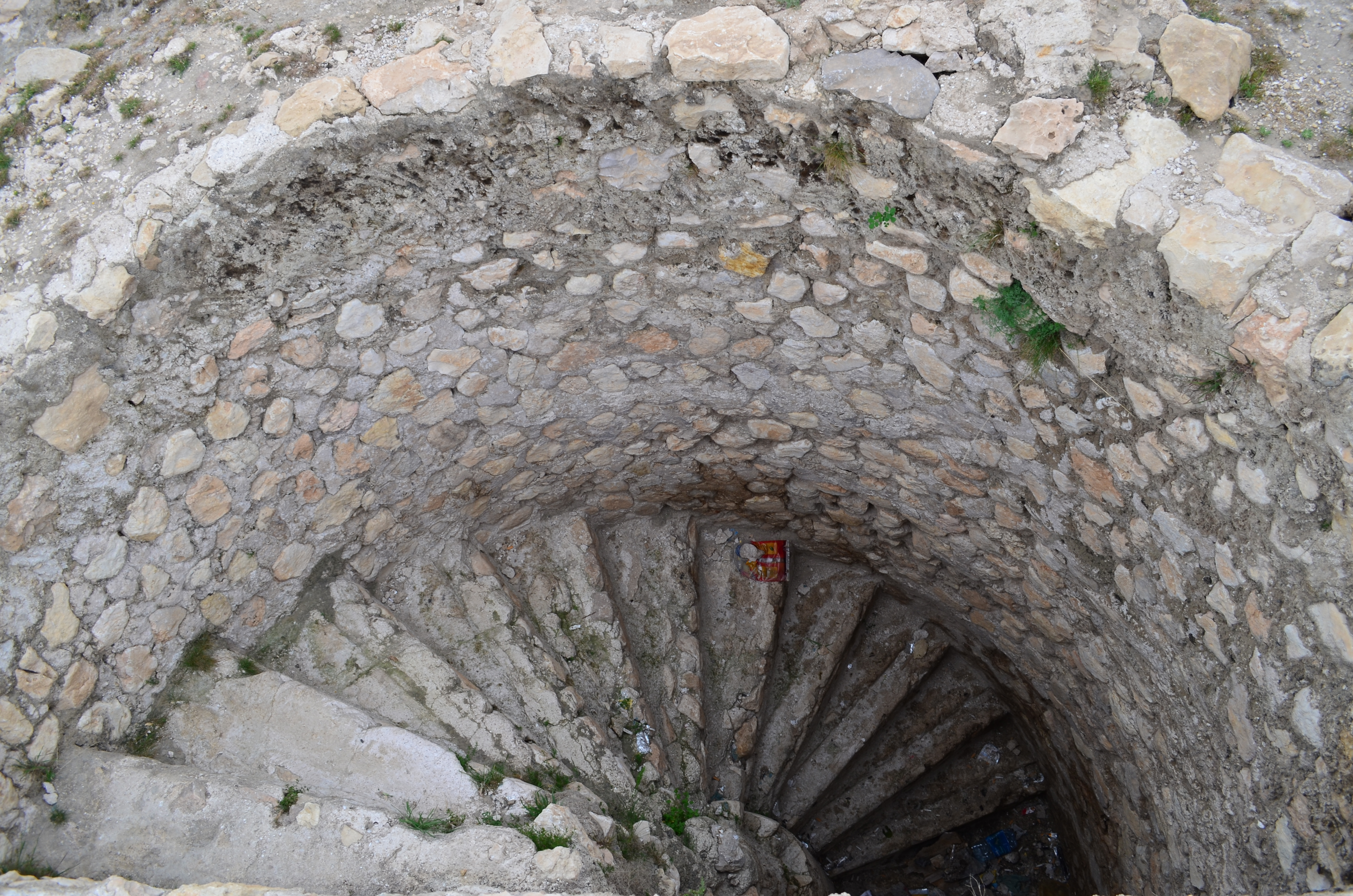

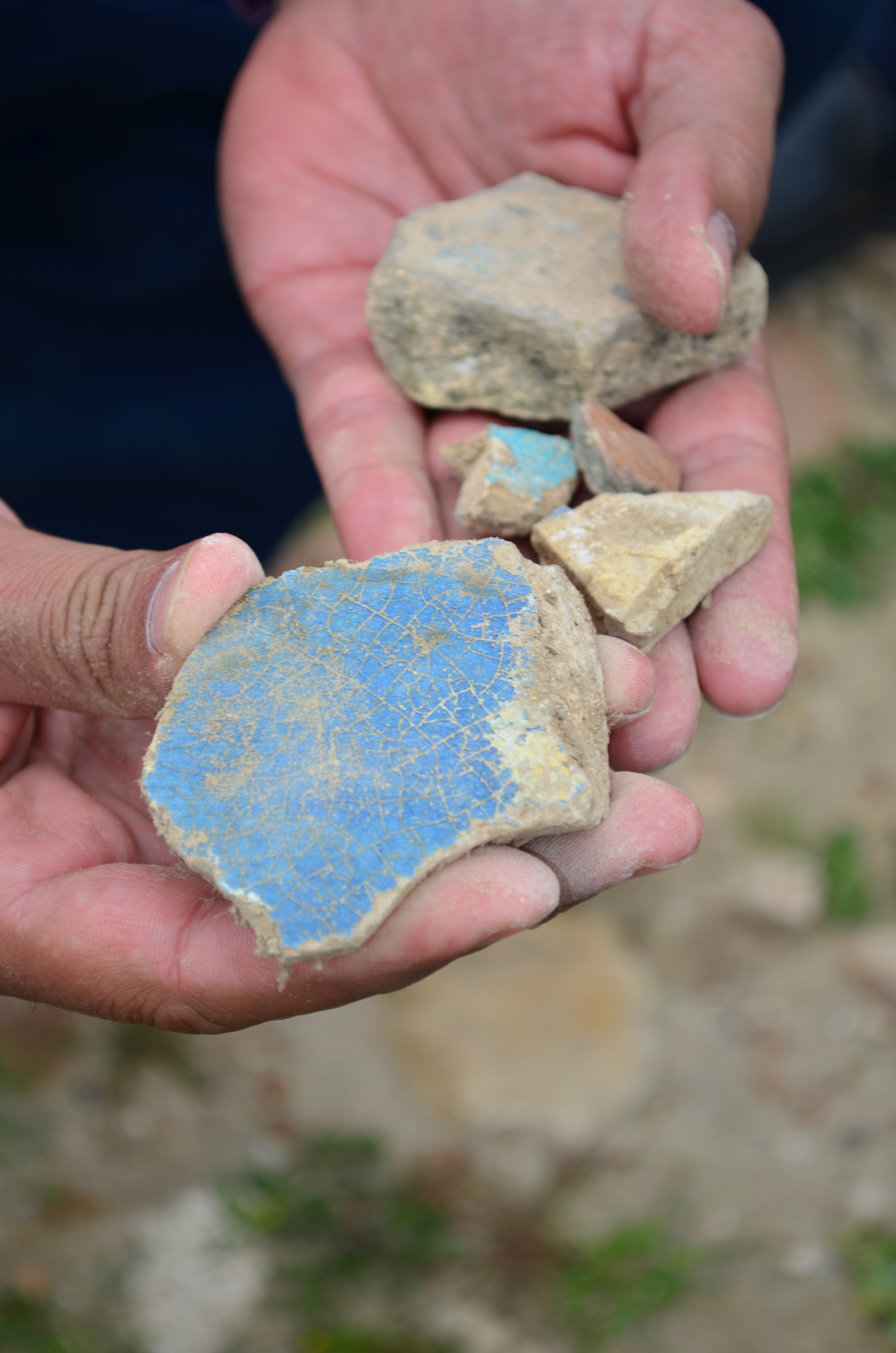

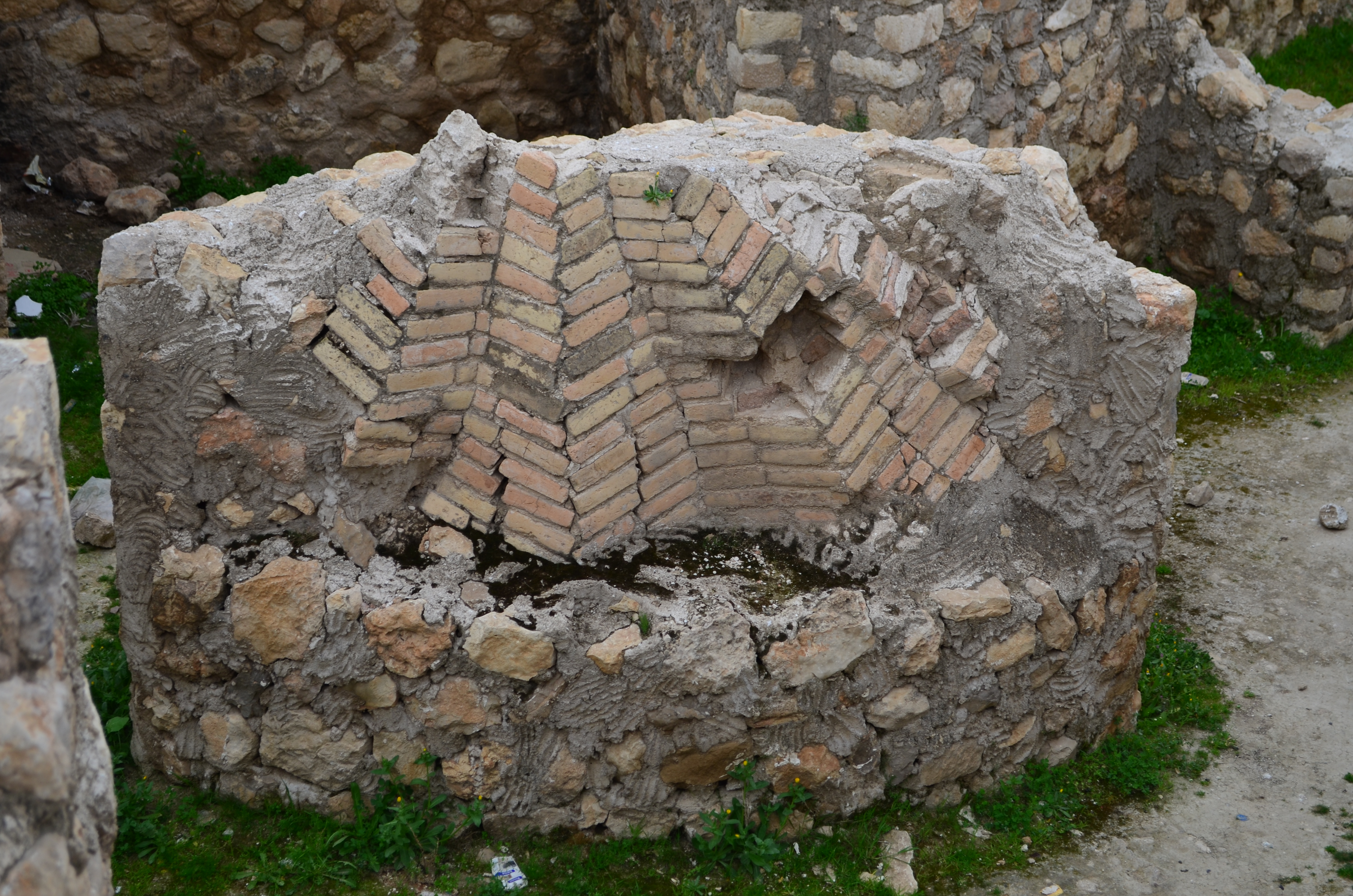
