= Kul-e Farah =

Archaeological site in Iran

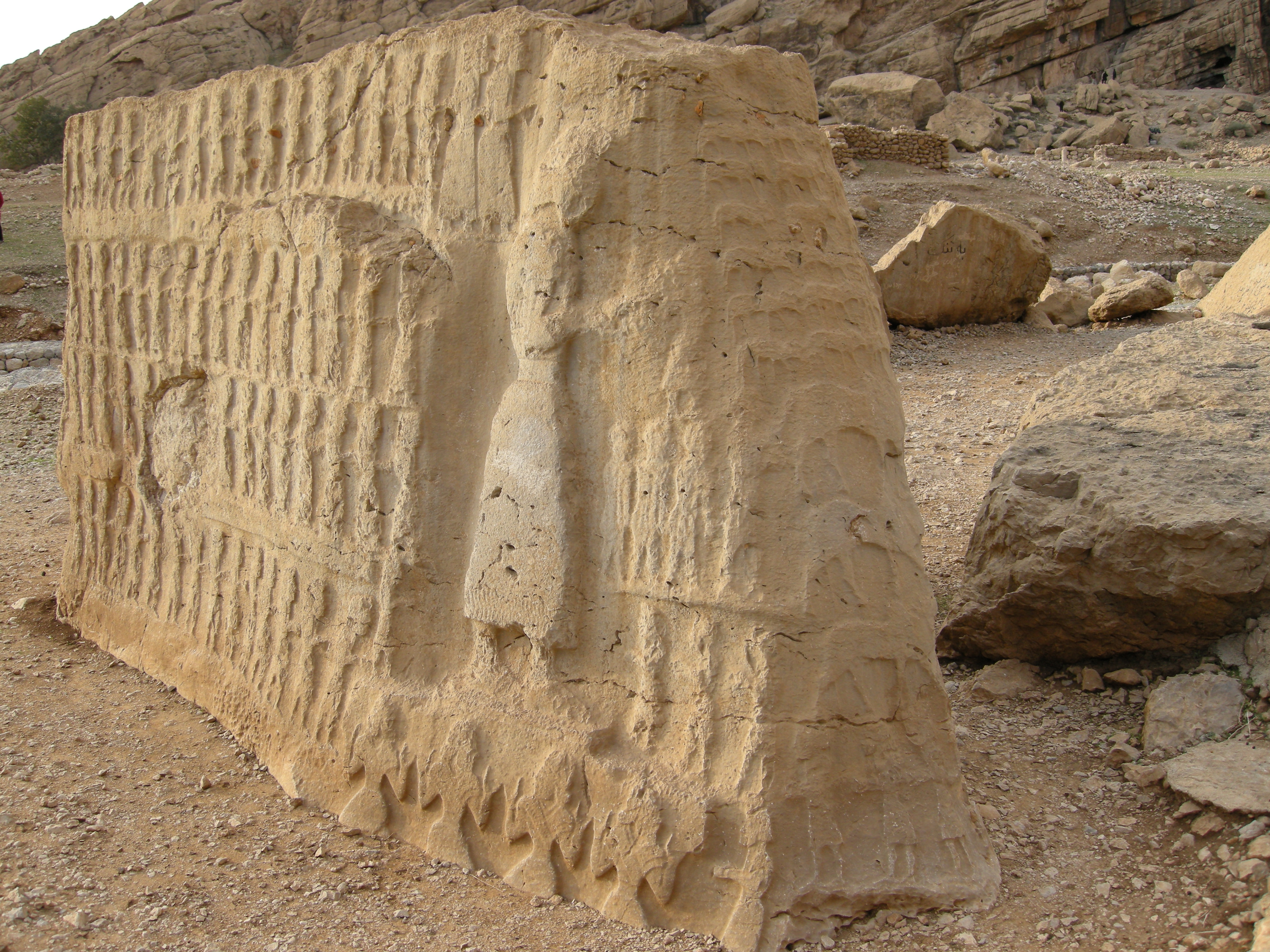
- Boulder of Kul-e Farah III, southern and eastern faces (J. Alvarez-Mon)

- Location within Iran Location within Near East
- 31°52′19″N 49°55′42″E
- Location: Kahbad-e Do, Khuzestan province, Iran

Iran National Heritage List
- Official name: Kul-e Farah Rock Relief
- Type: Rock Relief
- Designated: 1932
- Reference no.: 133
- Conservation organization: Cultural Heritage, Handicrafts and Tourism Organization of Iran

Kul-e Farah (Persian: سنگ‌نگاره کول‌فرح) is an archaeological site and open-air sanctuary situated approximately 800 metres (2,600 ft) above sea level in the Zagros Mountains of Iran. Six Elamite-era rock reliefs are located in a small gorge marked by a seasonal creek bed on the plain's east side of the valley, near the town of Izeh in Khuzestan.

== History of scholarship ==
The earliest reference to the existence of the reliefs was made in 1836 by H.C. Rawlinson (1839) followed by A. H. Layard (1846) whose work included a preliminary account of the cuneiform inscriptions. A complete bibliography was written by Eric De Waele (1976a: 5-8).

A study of selected reliefs was attempted by members of the French archaeological mission in Persia. In particular, the work of Gustave Jéquier (1901), with the ensuing epigraphic work of Father Jean-Vincent Scheil, and sketches made by J. de Morgan. More than half a century later, a Belgian archaeological mission under the direction of L. Vanden Berghe (1963) began a project of more systematic documentation ensued by an in-depth study undertaken by Eric De Waele as the main focus of his doctoral dissertation (for the interlude 1901–1963 see historiography in Vanden Berghe 1963). Work by E. De Waele lasted between 1970 and 1975 (adding a total of close to two months of field work).

The end result came in the form of an unpublished doctoral dissertation and a string of seven articles including illustrations and line-drawings (De Waele 1972a, 1972b, 1973, 1976a, 1976b, 1979, 1981, and 1989). A renewed interest in the reliefs has led to recent works by W. Henkelman (2008; particularly 2011: 128-33) and J. Álvarez-Mon (2010a, 2010b, 2011, 2013, 2017, 2019 and 2020).

== Chronology ==
KF I has been dated to the 8th century to the first half of the 6th century BC in accordance with the contents of a large Elamite cuneiform inscription engraved over its surface and with artistic analysis (Weissbach 1894; Scheil 1901: 102–113; Hinz 1962; König 1965, inscription EKI 75, and captions EKI 75A-K; Stolper 1988).

A more precise date to the last part of the Neo-Elamite period (after the Assyrian campaigns) is now recommended by Vallat (between 585 and c. 539 BC,1996: 387–9, 2006); Tavernier (last quarter of the 7th century BC, 2004: 19, 21; c. 630–610 BC, 2006); Henkelman (“to the very last part of the Neo-Elamite period”; 2008: 329); and Álvarez-Mon (650 – c. 550 BC; 2010: 50, 201, 266).

The other reliefs used to be considered together as a single group manufactured sometime during the Neo-Elamite period or, more precisely: the “époque Elamite récente” (G. Jéquier 1901: 142; L. Vanden Berghe 1963: 39); the period of Elamite-Persian cohabitation (Calmeyer 1973: 15); a broader Neo-Elamite sequence ranging from the 9th to the 6th centuries BC (De Waele 1976a: 337; 1981: 52); and a period comprising the 8th–7th centuries BC (Vanden Berghe 1984: 102–3; for KF III and VI see Álvarez-Mon 2010: 39).

In 1984 E. Carter (1984: 172) proposed a pre-1st millennium BC date for KF IV. This was followed by P. Amiet (1992: 86-7) who, making exception for KF I and V, suggested the reliefs manifested the expression of a local monarchy that developed in eastern Elam after the invasion of the Babylonian king Nebuchadnezzar I (ca. 1104 BC), or perhaps slightly later, at the beginning of the 10th century BC. J. Álvarez-Mon has suggested dating the platform bearers represented at KF III and VI to the second half of the 7th century – 6th century BC ( Álvarez-Mon 2010a: 266; 2010b) and KF IV to the 9th – 8th centuries BC (2019).

== Manufacture ==
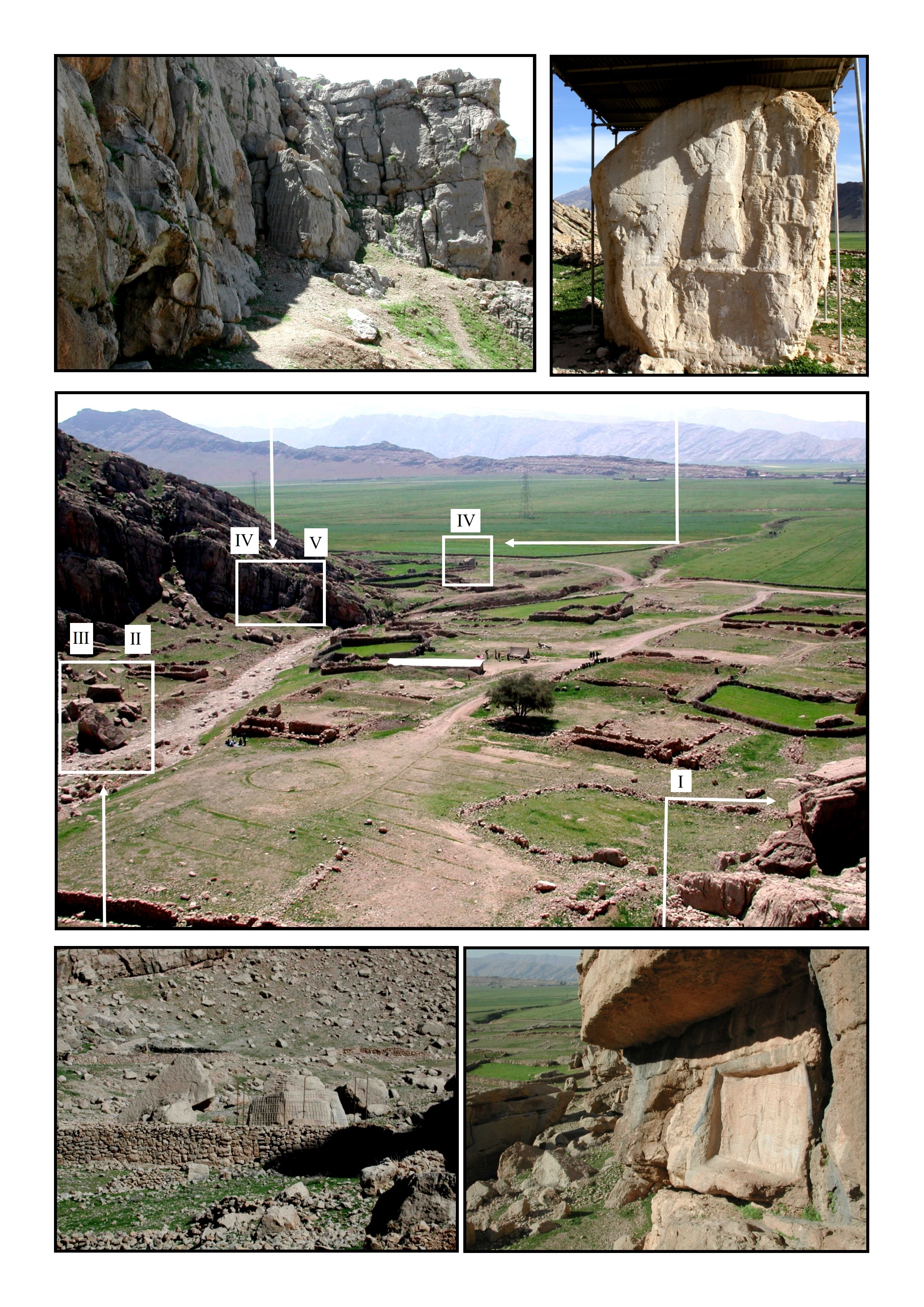
View of Kul-e Farah

L. Vanden Berghe (1986: 161-2) was first to notice the exceptional technical characteristics employed in the manufacture of the Elamite highland reliefs from Izeh/Mālamir and Kurangun. Expanding on this work, J. Álvarez-Mon (2019) tentatively suggests the manufacture of this and related reliefs may have involved the following general steps: (1) a flat panel was cut over the rock; (2) the imagery was carved in low-relief; (3) the surface was plastered and modelled with a bitumen-like solid material; (4) detail was added by incision with the help of a sharp object; (5) the reliefs were painted

== Descriptions ==
The reliefs exhibit processions, the sacrifice of animals, musical performances, and banqueting. They are characterized by the presence of a large-scale ruler (KFI, II, III, V); a large-scale ruler or deity being carried atop a platform (KF III, VI); a sitting ruler presiding over a banquet (KF IV) and animal sacrifice (KFI, KFII, KF V), and the presence of small orchestras (KF I, III, IV).

== Significance ==
The collective display of participants on KFIII (200 individuals), KFIV (about 140 individuals) and Kurangun II and III (about 43 individuals) flag a new chapter in the history of Elamite sculptural arts, offering a spectacle of social hierarchy determined by scale, placement inside registers, physical relationship to rulers, garment, gesture, and activities.

This is an idealized view of a community strengthened through social bonds intimately attached to the notion of sacred space (Kul-e Farah and Kurangun), self-determined ethnic identity (marked by distinctive physical features, particularly long, braided hair), the enactment of specific rituals (processions, animal sacrifice, a communal feasting) and the reinforcement of custom (worship of old Elamite deities). All together: place, self-representation, and ritual provide a nexus of identity markers defining a population characterized by specific culture and socio-political ideology.

The specific location of the reliefs suggests that Kul-e Farah must have enjoyed a particular religious significance; perhaps of transcendent nature. Indeed, this evidence may advocate a belief system where the notion and experience of the supernatural developed out of close association with landscapes of extraordinary aesthetic natural properties. The reliefs from Kul-e Farah provide further indication of the legacy of the Elamite highlands as a cultural and socio-political nexus of ideology announcing that of the Achaemenids.

In the words of W. Henkelman: The sanctuary of Kul-e Farah is “a dazzling complex of iconographic themes, religious concepts, social stratigraphy, and ideological strategies…. It is here, at Aiapir, that we get close to Elamite religion as one possibly can, and it is here that we find the most eloquent expression of a feast that, only a few generations after Hanni, was celebrated in similar form in Pārsa” (Henkelman 2011: 131 and 133).

Amiet (1992b: 89, nt. 37) theorized that this display of communal events and complex rituals expressed a “new consciousness” that arose from the settlement and commingling of Iranian-speaking nomadic populations with local Elamites. Yet, with only a single exception—the relief of Kul-e Farah I commissioned by Hanni of Aiapir—we have no information about who the large groups of people depicted in the reliefs were, or where they were living. Furthermore, the once-favored notion, taken for granted by Amiet, that they were nomadic pastoralists is no longer accepted by most specialists. Instead, it is likely that their socioeconomic and political fabric relied on agro-pastoralist activities, and dynamic power structures and regional alliances integrated within the Elamite kingdom.

Regardless of the linguistic, socio-economic and cultural backgrounds of the participants, the highland reliefs advocate for a continuity in Elamite religious belief and practice. Their placement at Kul-e Farah, and the related open air reliefs in the sanctuaries of Shekaft-e Salman, Kurangun and Naqsh-e Rustam suggests that the natural landscape was an essential component of traditional Elamite cultic ideology and practice.

If the location of the sanctuaries and their resident deities were a vital component of Elamite religion, visiting and interacting with them were also essential elements of what it meant to be a member of Elamite society. Furthermore, the precedents that these reliefs set for Persian sculptural and religious tradition is palpable.

== Gallery ==
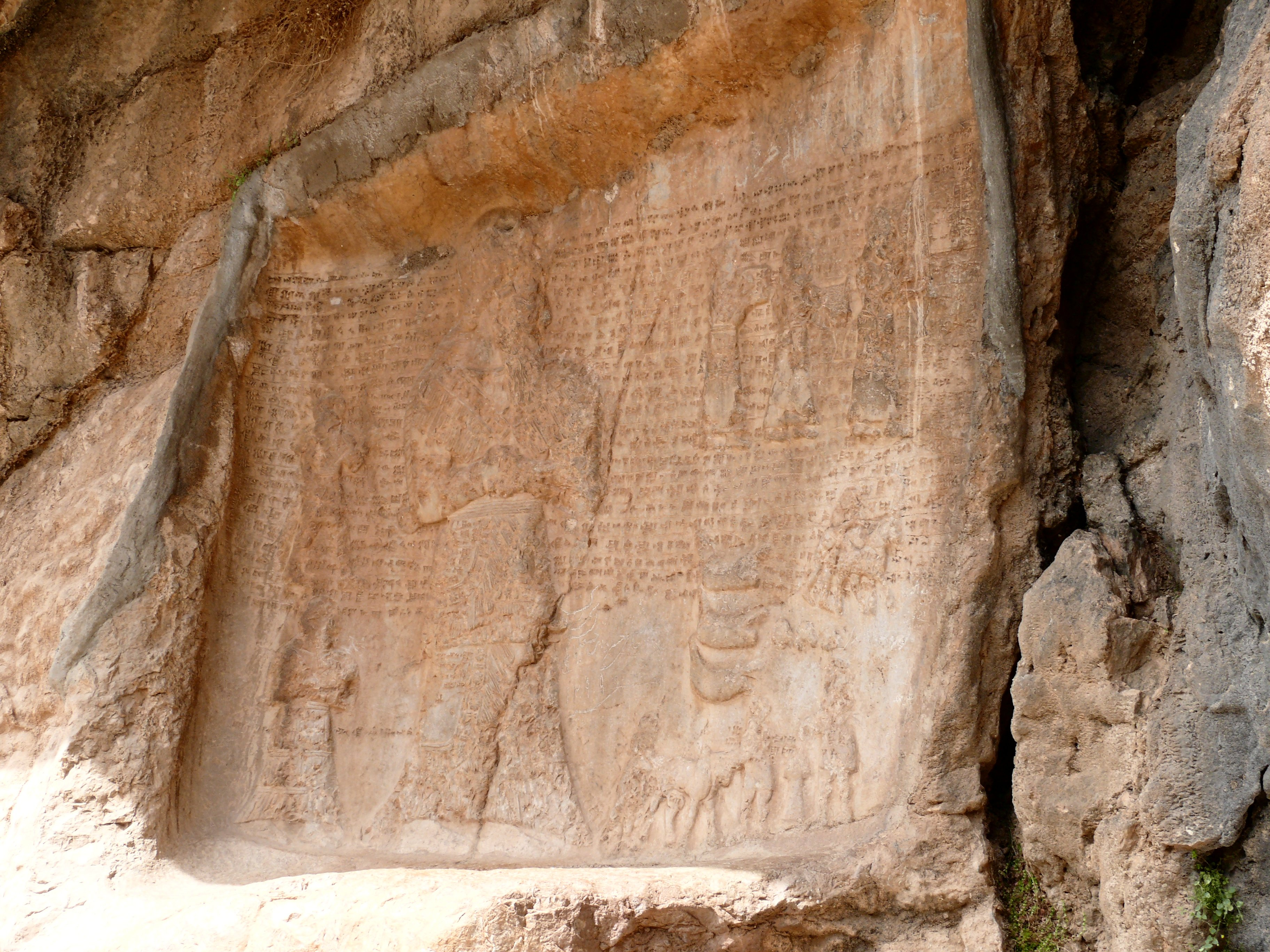
Kul-e Farah I

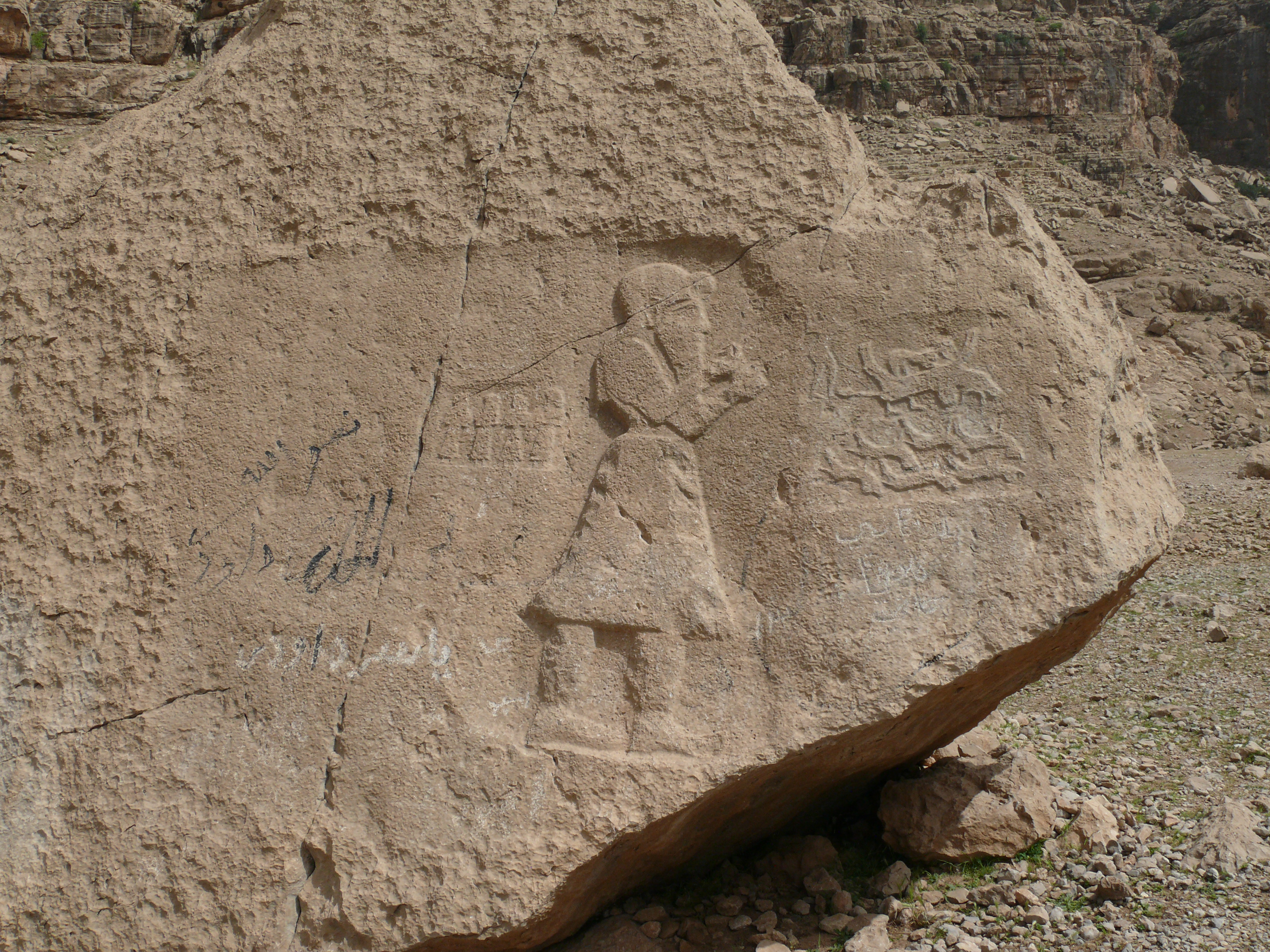
Kul-e Farah II

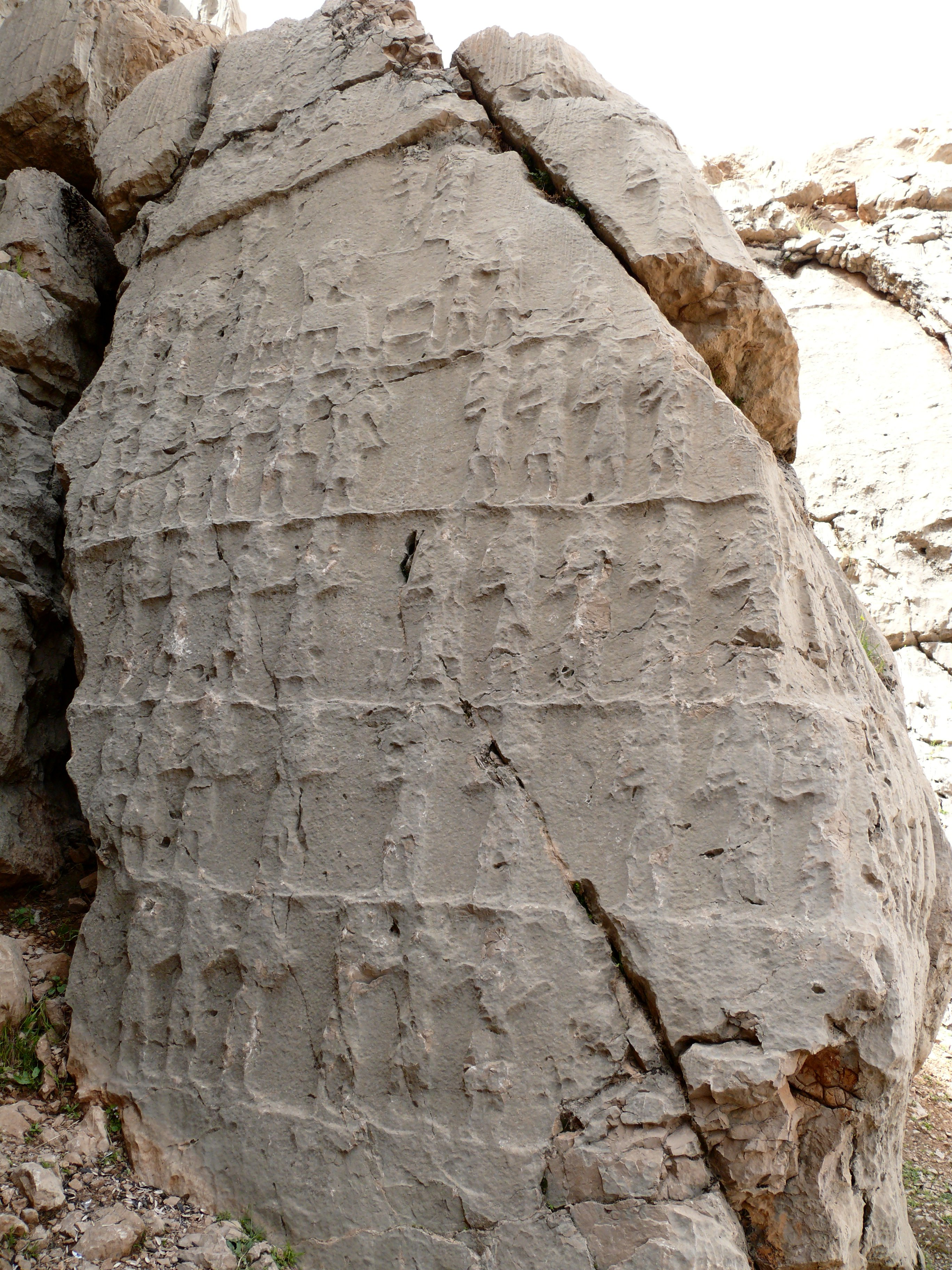
Kul-e Farah IV

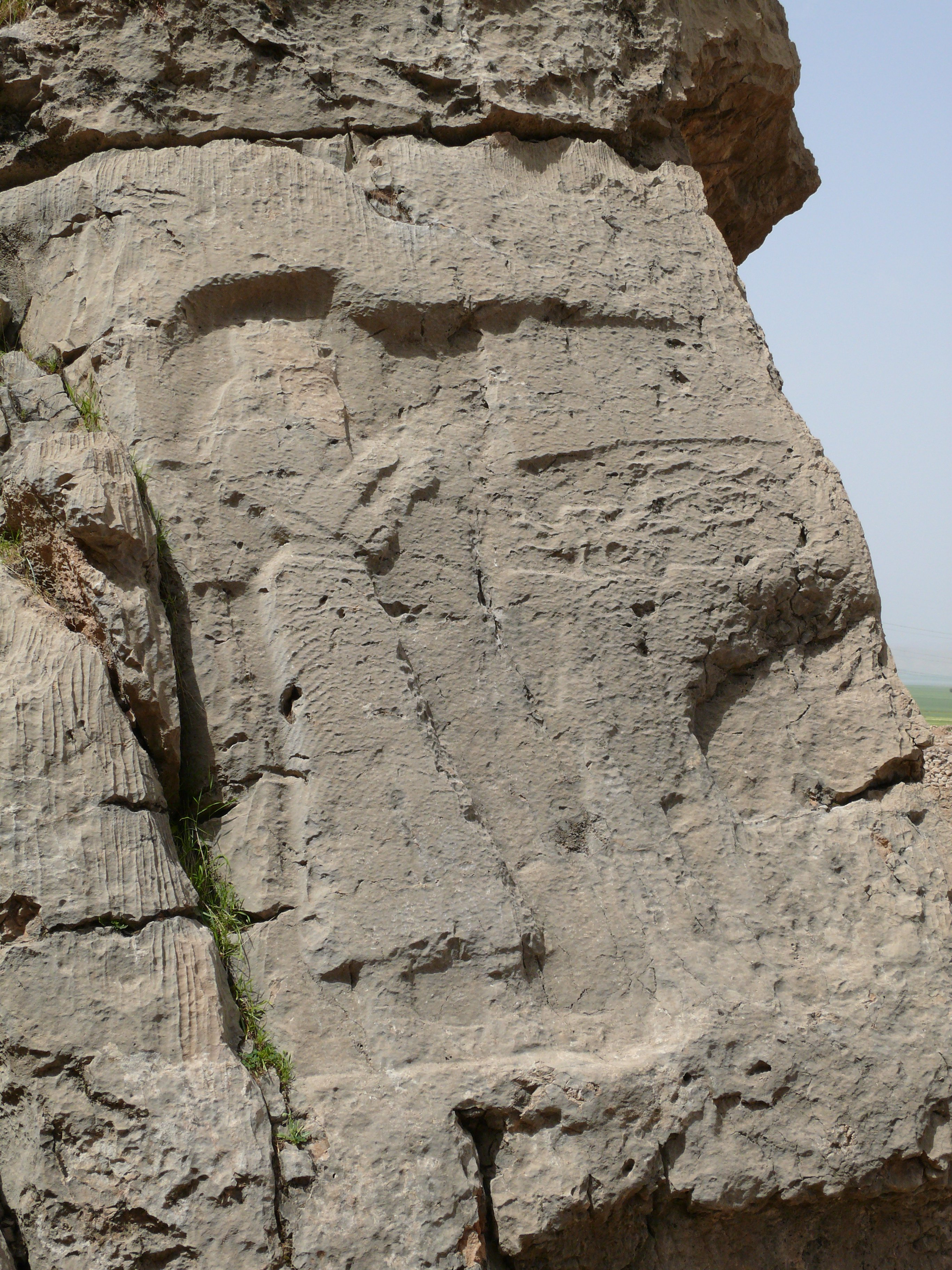
Kul-e Farah V

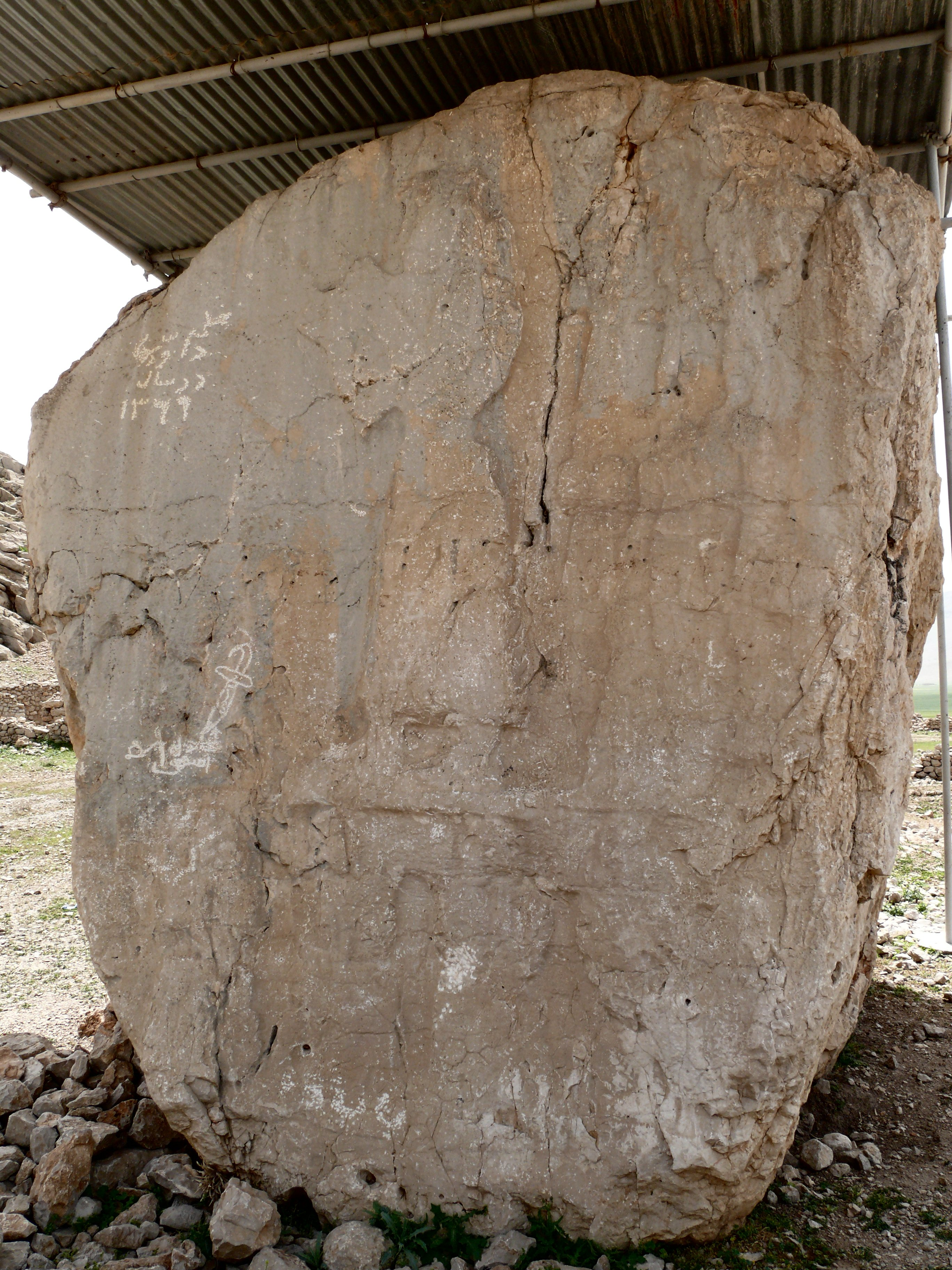
Kul-e Farah VI

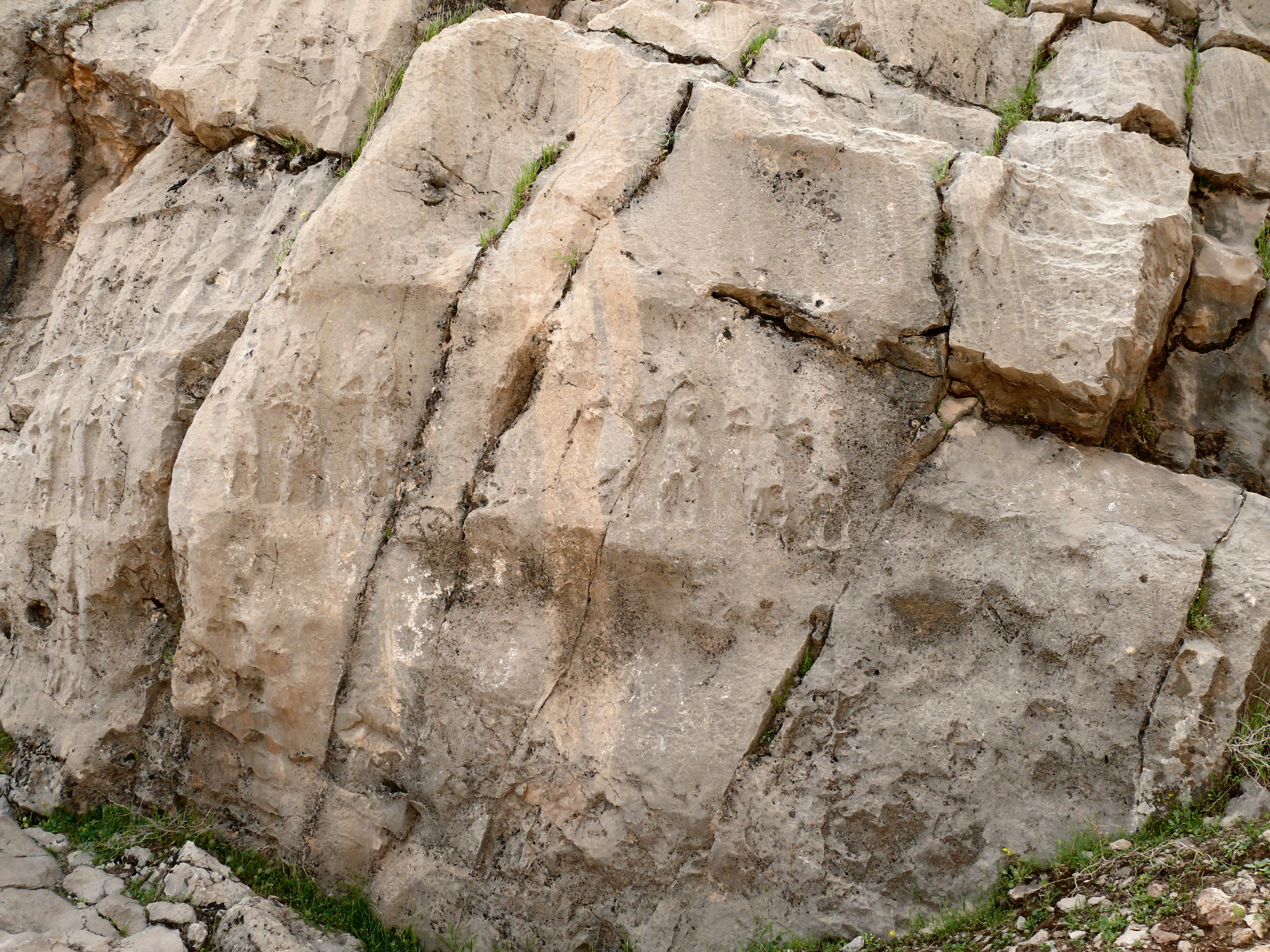
Kul-e farah IV (other view)

== Reliefs ==
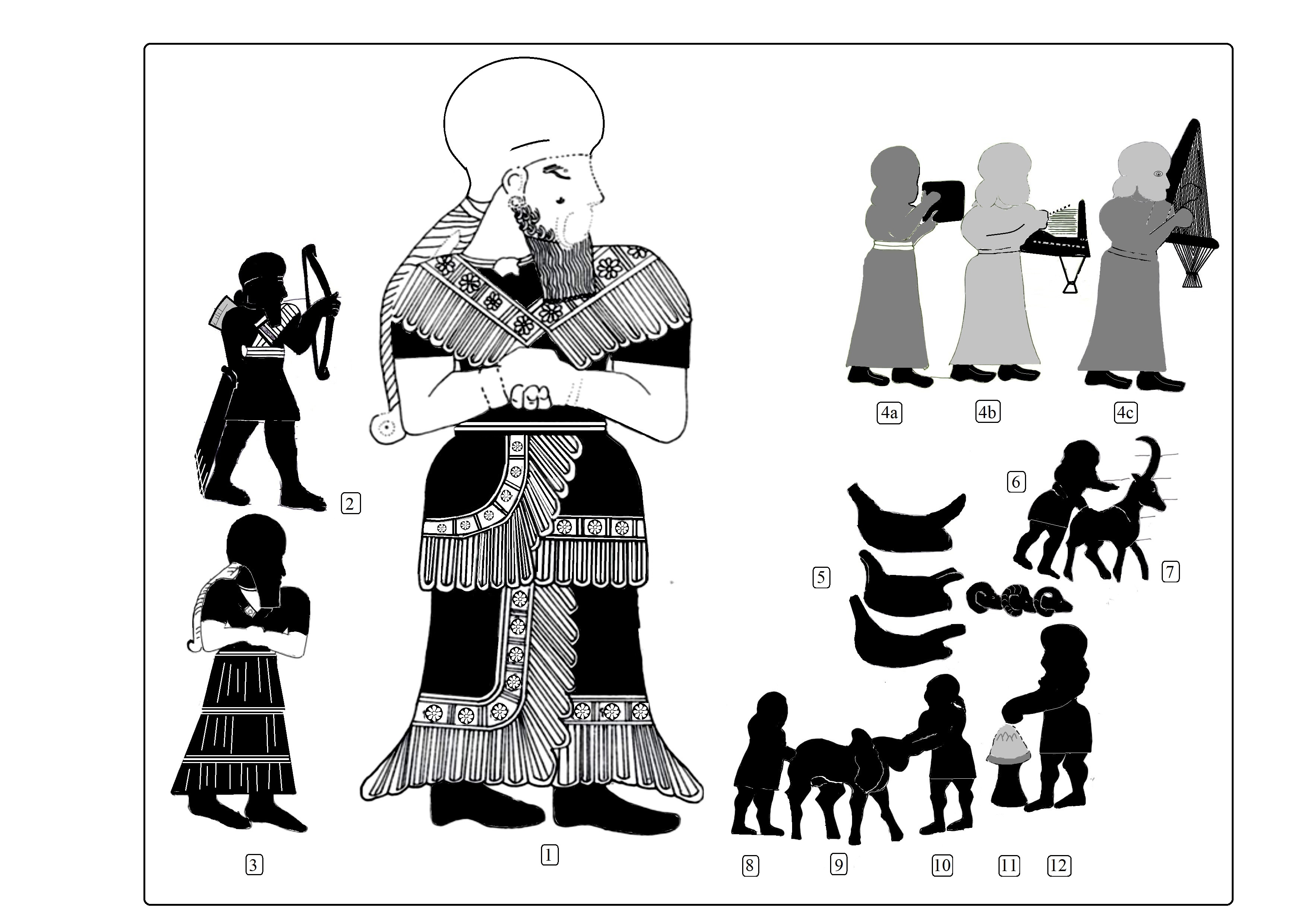
Line-drawing of Kul-e Farah I (by J. Alvarez-Mon)

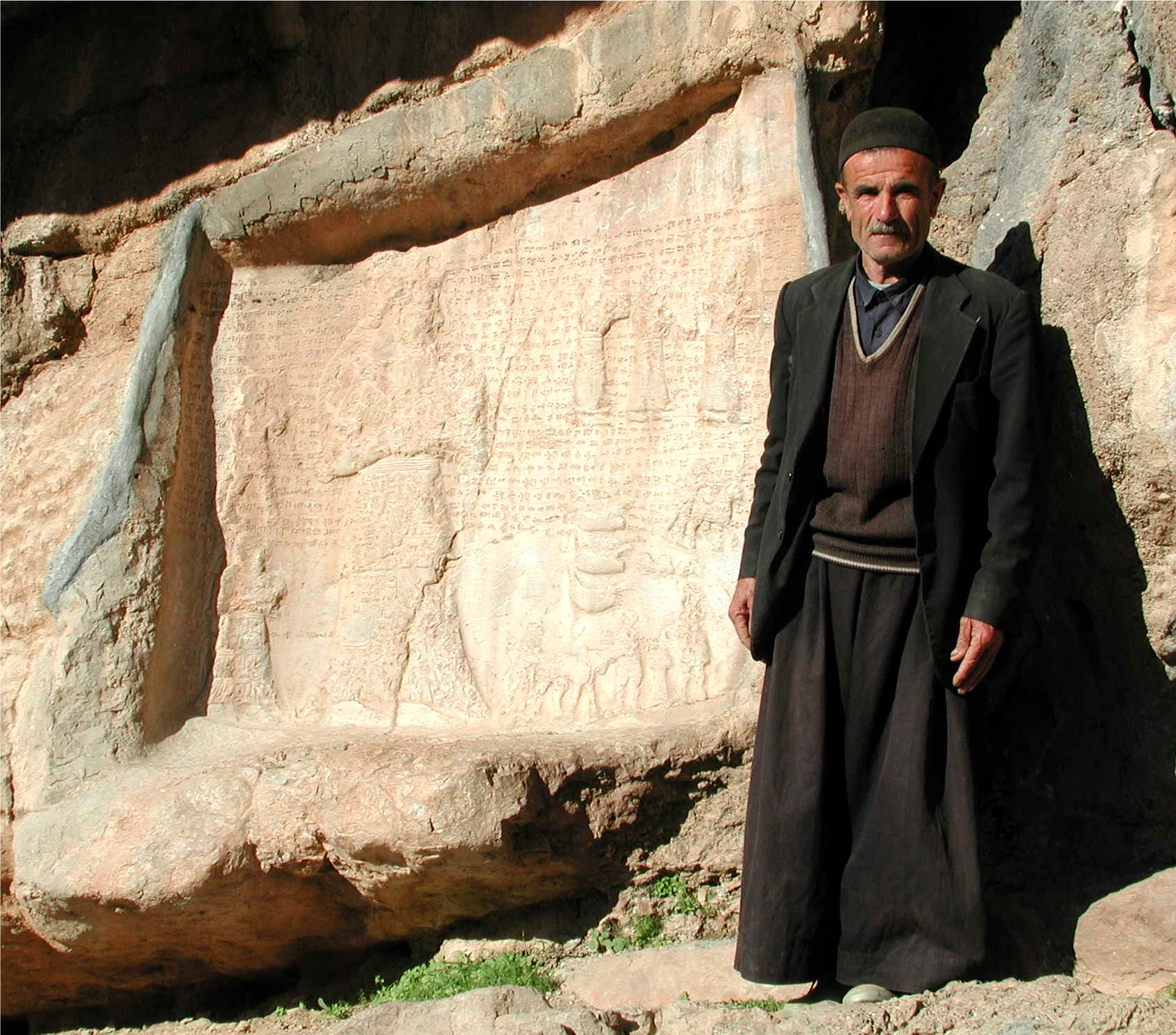
Kul-e Farah I and Mr. Asadi (by J. Alvarez-Mon)

=== Kul-e Farah I (c. 650–575 BC) ===
KFI (h. 1.35 m, w.1.68 m) was the last of the Elamite highland reliefs and assimilates many aspects of the earlier carvings. A long Elamite inscription on the upper half of the relief identifies the large central figure as Hanni, son of Tahhi, “prince” or “chief” (kutur) of Aiapir and vassal of the Elamite king Shutur-Nahhunte, son of Indada. This difficult-to-read text dedicates the Kul-e Farah complex to Tirutir, a deity unattested elsewhere in Elamite sources, and invokes several Elamite deities.

It goes on to talk about Hanni's various pious acts, his loyalty toward the king, his military activity and the sculpting of his own image with an inscription. It curses against anyone who would dare damage the relief. Hanni stands with his hands clasped wearing a bulbous cap, a waist-length braid, and a heavily fringed garment ornamented with rosettes. Behind him stand two smaller-scale court officials, a weapon bearer labeled “Shutruru, the Master of the Palace” carrying a bow, quiver and sword, and a garment bearer with hands clasped.

In front of Hanni are: a trio of musicians playing a horizontal harp, a vertical harp and a square drum; a goat handler next to the carcasses of three rams; two individuals about to slaughter a zebu; and a priest presiding over a fire altar. A series of epigraphs, mostly added onto the garment skirts, name these various individuals.https://artsandculture.google.com/story/aQVRgujFxo1rWQ

=== Kul-e Farah II (7th–6th century BC) ===
Kul-e Farah II (h. 2.40 m, w. 3.55 m). KFII was carved on the southwestern face of a boulder situated in the vicinity of reliefs KFIII and KFIV. From left to right it depicts: four individuals with clasped hands in a small, well-defined rectangular panel; a large-scale male individual making an index-finger-pointing gesture; and an animal sacrifice scene composed of a standing naked individual, a naked individual bending over a zebu, and six smaller round-horned sheep.

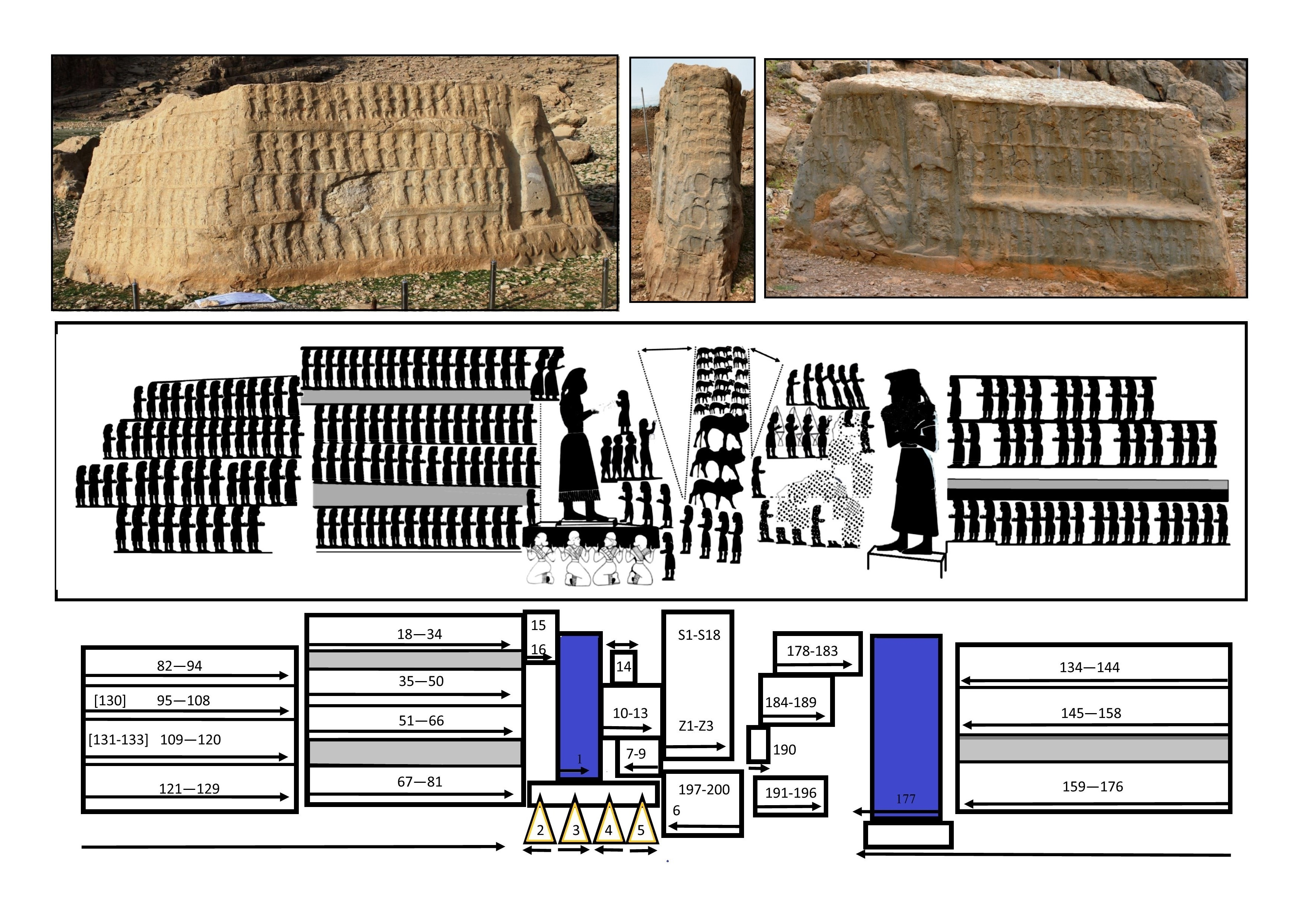
Line-drawing of Kul-e Farah III (by J. Alvarez-Mon)

=== Kul-e Farah III (8th–7th centuries BC) ===
Kul-e Farah III (approx. h. 1.9-4 m, w. 16 m; ). Traveling around the entire 16 m perimeter of a boulder, KFIII depicts a procession involving no less than 200 participants and several domestic animals. At the head of the procession kneel four elite male individuals dressed in caps and long, fringed garments supporting a large-scale male figure [no. 1] on a platform. This figure is oriented toward the narrowest face of the relief showing a flock of eighteen rams and three zebus. He clasps his hands together in front of the waist.

At about the same position on the opposite face is another large-scale male [no. 177], who also faces the animals and clasps the hands together. Besides the animals, the focal space between the two high-status individuals accommodates naked figures, figures wearing long and short garments, three harp players, and a vessel bearer [Pl. 152]. Behind them are large numbers of worshipers arranged in registers making the hands-clasped gesture.

One of the better-preserved figures on the relief [no. 180] retains outlines of the clasped-hands gesture and hairstyle combining a short back-braid and frontal “visor” [Pl. 151].

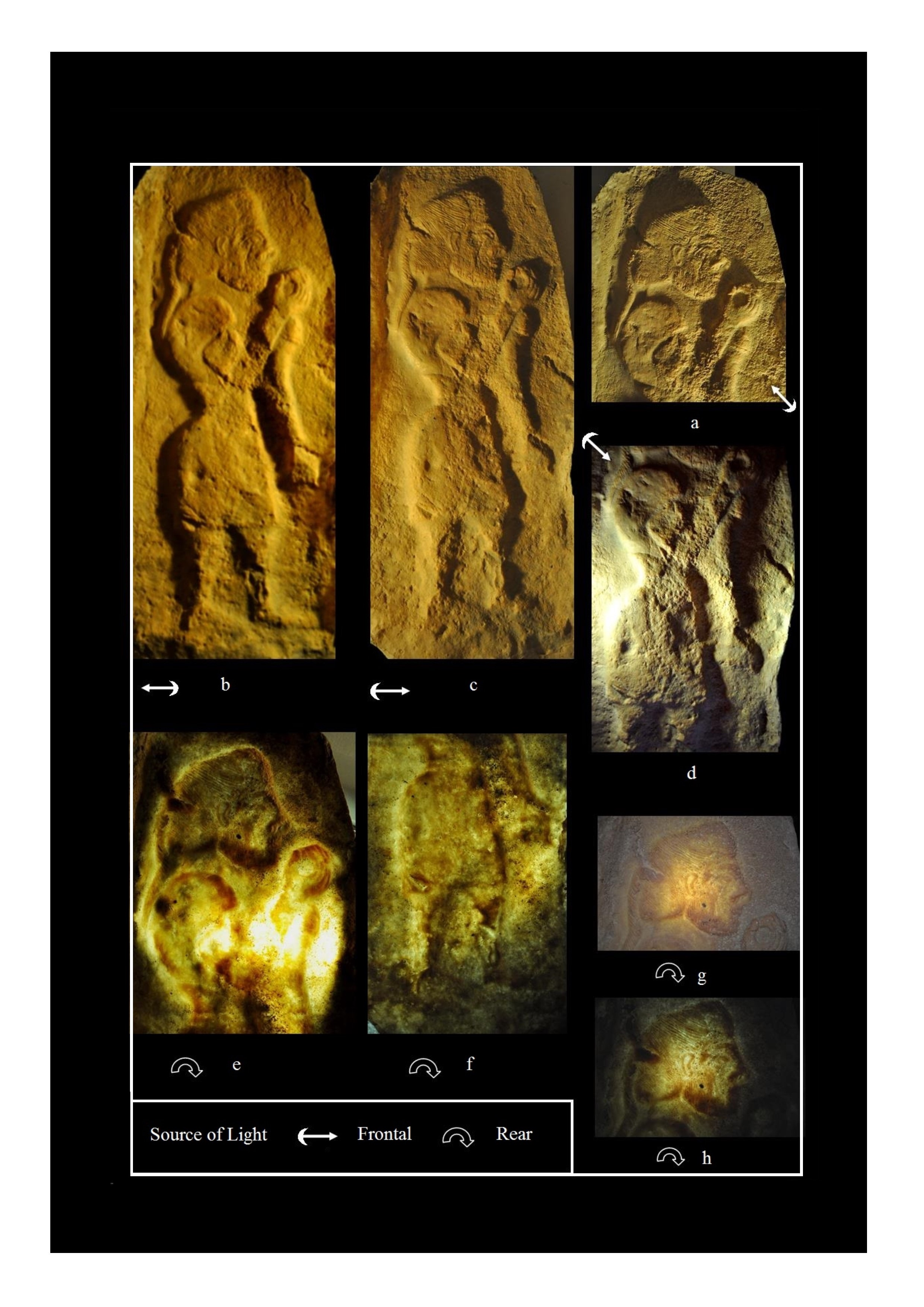
Cast of archer from Ku-e Farah IV (Alvarez-Mon)

=== Kul-e Farah IV (9th–8th century BC) ===
Kul-e Farah IV (approx. h. 6 m, w. 17.70 m). Extending across a large vertical surface of a cliff, KFIV depicts a communal banquet with no less than 141 participants. Presiding over the ceremony is a ruler seated on a high-backed throne framed by two tables, the one behind supporting vessels, the one at the front possibly laden with food.

Further vessels, a pair of distinctive, tall, narrow beakers, stand together two registers below. The ruler is accompanied by attendants, a weapon-bearer, archers, six harp players and over a hundred individuals represented similarly with long, braided hair, short garment, and right hand raising a morsel of food (meat?) to the mouth. The majority of the participants are inside registers, martially organized in rows on both sides of an imaginary focal axial point at approximately the center, and oriented toward it.

One especially well preserved figure provides valuable insights into the sculptural arts of the time. He is represented in profile with the left shoulder projecting forward, the hand holding a short composite bow. He has broad shoulders, a narrow waist and a short-sleeved garment with a short kilt. Sections of his hair, neck, back, and right shoulder have preserved evidence of the plaster, engraving and possibly pigmentation that may have once covered the entire relief. Much of the original volume has been lost through surface erosion but a “natural” plastic treatment of body parts through variable carving depths is still evident.

=== Kul-e Farah V (7th–6th century BC) ===
Kul-e Farah V (h. 2.40 m, w. 1.85 m). KFV was carved near KFIV on the vertical face of a cliff outcrop on the left bank of the seasonal creek. The iconography and structure of the composition are similar to KFII: a large-scale male individual faces an animal sacrifice and makes an index-finger-pointing gesture; behind him stand four worshipers with clasped hands. This time, however, the four figures are arranged vertically. Another novel element is the inclusion of a fire altar below the sacrificial scene.

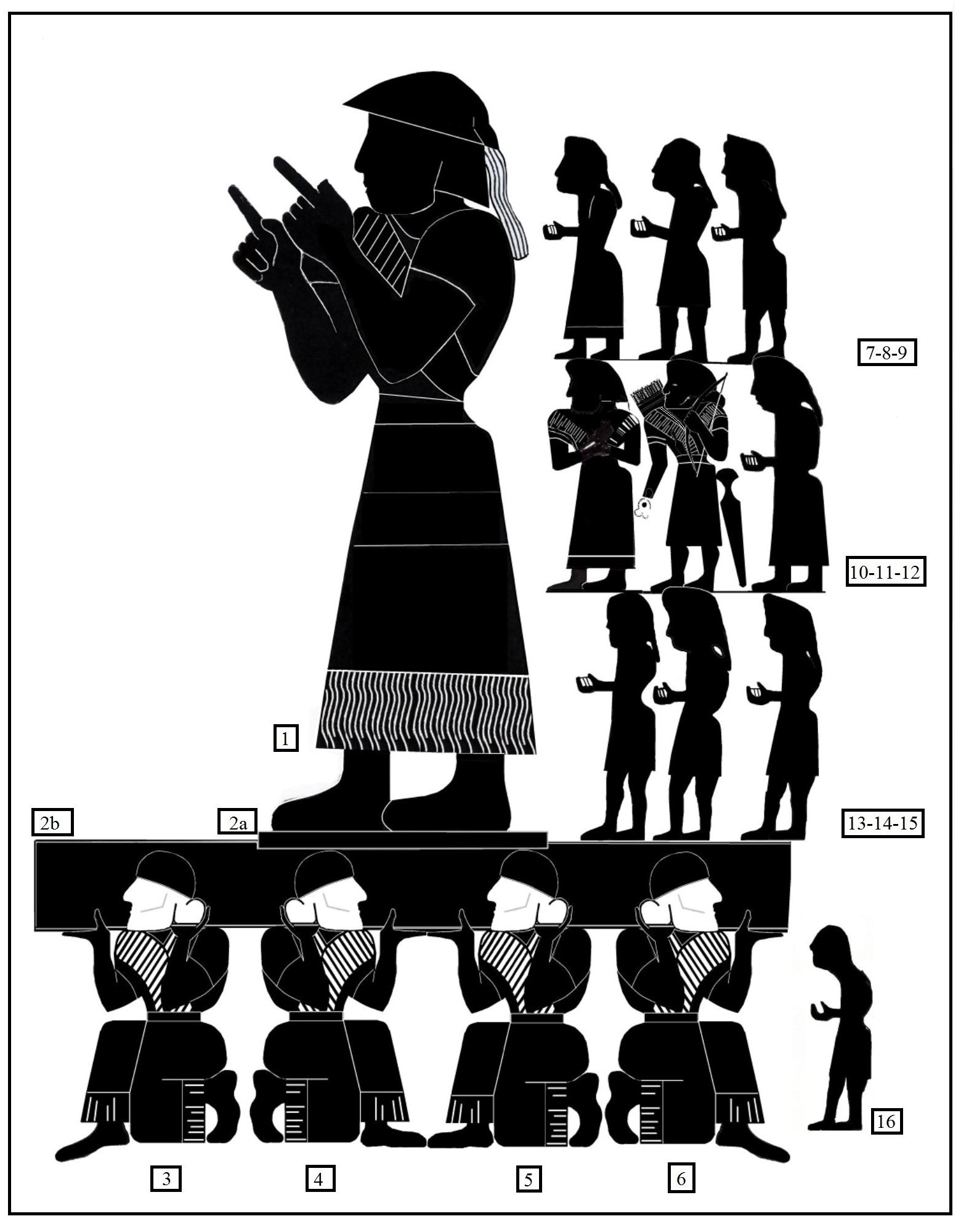
Kul-e Farah VI line drawing by J. Alvarez-Mon

=== Kul-e Farah VI (7th–6th century BC) ===
Kul-e Farah VI (h. 3.7 m, w. 2.8 m).KFVI is carved on the northwest face of a boulder located about 300 meters outside the ravine housing the other reliefs. It depicts a large-scale individual in a long, fringed garment making an index-finger-pointing gesture with both hands. He stands on a pedestal atop a platform carried by four platform-bearers who kneel on one knee. The platform-bearers are all similarly represented with a long, fringed garment, a tight, round cap, a neat hair-bun at the back, and a short beard.

Behind the large-scale figure stand nine worshipers in groups of three along three horizontal registers. Below, another worshiper stands alone next to the platform bearers. Everyone is oriented to the left except for two of the platform bearers. Special importance is allocated to a weapon bearer [no. 11] in the middle of the third register. He is represented frontally, displaying wide shoulders and chest, and the fringes on the upper part of the garment. The right arm is extended downward and the hand appears to hold an intriguing U-shaped object (perhaps an open-ended “ring” of the type discussed later in this chapter; the left hand is raised to the chest and appears to hold a bow; a dagger is tucked under the belt on the right side of the body; a hatched quiver is carried over the right shoulder; and a long sword (presumably inside a scabbard) with a lunate-shaped pommel hangs from the waist at the back, almost touching the ground.

== See also ==
- Sarpol-e Zahab

== Bibliography ==
- Álvarez-Mon. J., 2010a. The Arjān Tomb: at the Crossroads between the Elamite and the Persian Empires. Acta Iranica Series 49, Leuven. 2010.
- Idem, 2010b. “Platform Bearers from Kul-e Farah III and VI”, Iran, Journal of the British Institute of Persian Studies 48, 2010, pp. 27–41.
- Idem, 2011. “Elamite Garments and Headdresses of the Late Neo-Elamite Period (7th – 6th century BC)”, Archäeologischen Mitteilungen aus Iran 42, 2010, pp. 1–29.
- Idem, 2013. “Braids of Glory, Elamite Sculptural Reliefs from the Highlands: Kul-e Farah IV”, in K. de Graef and J. Tavernier (eds.), Susa and Elam. 2009 International Congress. Gent. Iranica Antiqua.
- Idem 2017. Elamite Rock Reliefs. In: Kunst- und Ausstellungshalle der Bundesrepublik Deutschland GmbH. International Museum Exhibit 2017–8, Bonn, Germany.
- Idem. 2019. The Monumental Highland Reliefs of Elam: a Complete Inventory and Analysis (from the 17th to 6th Century BC). Eisenbrauns & Penn State University Press. University Park, Pennsylvania.
- Idem. 2020. The Art of Elam (c. 4200-525 BC). Routledge: London & New York.
- Amiet, P., 1992. “Bronzes Elamites de la Collection George Ortiz”, Archäeologischen Mitteilungen aus Iran 25, 1992, pp. 81–9.
- Carter, E., 1984. “Archaeology”, in E. Carter and M.W. Stolper, Elam, Surveys of Political history and Archaeology, California, pp. 103–230.
- De Waele, E., 1972a. “Shutruk-Nahunte II et les Reliefs Rupestres dits Néo-Elamites d’Iseh/Mālamīr”, Revue des Archéologues et Historiens d’Art de Louvain 5: 17–32.
- Idem, 1972b. “Quelques aspects de la religion d’Élam à travers l’art rupestre d’époque Neo-Élamite D’Izeh/Mālamir”, Iran Bastan Museum Publication, Tehran.
- Idem, 1973. “Une page d’art Iranien : les reliefs rupestres d’Īzeh Mālamīr”, Archeologia 60: 31–46.
- Idem, 1976a. Les Reliefs Rupestres Élamites de Shekāf-e Salmān et Kul-e Farah près d’Izeh (Mālamir). Doctoral Dissertation, Université Catholique de Louvain, Belgium.
- Idem, 1976b. “Remarques sur les Inscriptions Élamites de Šekākt-e Salmān et Kul-e Farah près Izeh, I. Leur Corrélation avec les Bas-Reliefs”, Le Muséon 89, fasc. 3-4 : 441–50.
- Idem, 1979. “Les Processions avec Statues Divines sur les Reliefs Ruprestres Elamites, Kul-e Farah III et Kul-e Farah VI (Īzeh)”, Akten de VII. Internationalen Kongresses für Iranische Kunst und Archäologie, Berlin, pp. 93–101.
- Idem, 1981. “Travaux Archéologiques à Shekaft-e Salmān et Kul-e Farah prés d’Īzeh (Mālamīr)”, IrAnt 16: 45–61.
- Idem, 1989. “Musicians and musical instruments on the rock reliefs in the Elamite sanctuary of Kul-e Farah (Īzeh) ”, Iran 27: 29–38.
- Henkelman, W.F.M. 2008. The Other Gods Who Are, Studies in Elamite Iranian Acculturation based on the Persepolis Fortification Texts, Achaemenid History XIV, Nederlands Instituut voor het Nabije Oosten, Leiden.
- Idem, 2011. “Parnakka's Feast: šip in Pārsa and Elam”, in J. Álvarez-Mon and M.B. Garrison (eds.), Elam and Persia, Winona Lake: 89–166.
- Hinz, W., 1962. “Die Elamischen Inschriften des Hanne”, in: W.B. Hennig & E. Yarshater, eds., A Locust's Leg. Studies in Honour of S.H. Taqizadeh, London: 105–16.
- Idem, 1966. “Nachlese Elamischer Denkmäler”, Iranica Antiqua 6: 43–7.
- Jéquier, G., 1901. “Description du site de Mālamīr (Appendice)”. Mémoires de la Délégation en Perse 3, pp. 133–44.
- König, F.W., 1965. Die elamischen Königsinschriften, Archiv für Orientforschung Beiheft 16, Berlin/Graz.
- Layard, A.H., 1846. "A Description of the Province of Khuzistan", Journal of the Royal Geographical Society XVI: 75–80.
- Potts, D.T., 2004. “The Numinous and the Immanent. Some Thoughts on Kurangunr and the Rudkhaneh-e Fahliyān”, in: K.von Folsach, H. Thrane & I. Thuesen (eds.), From Handaxe to Khan. Essays Presented to Peder Mortensen on the Occasion of his 70th Birthday, Aarhus, 2004. Pp.143–56.
- Rawlinson, H.C., 1839. Notes on a march from Zohab, at the foot of Zagros along the mountains to Khuzistan (Susiana), and thence through the province of Lorestān to Kirmanshah in the Year 1836, JRGS IX.
- Scheil, V., 1901. Textes élamites-anzanites, première série. Mémoires de la Délégation en Perse 3, Paris.
- Stein, M.A., 1940. Old Routes of Western Iran, London.
- Stolper, M., 1988. “Mālamīr. B. Philologisch”. Reallexikon der Assyriologie und vorderasiatischen Archaologie VII, pp. 271–81.
- Tavernier, J., 2004. “Some Thoughts on Neo-Elamite Chronology”, Achaemenid Research on Texts and Archaeology 2004.003: 1–44.
- Idem, 2006. “Elam: Neo-Elamite Period (ca. 1000-530 B.C.), in: W. Eder & J. Renger (eds.), Chronologies of the Ancient World. Names, Dates and Dynasties, Leiden / Boston: 22–4.
- Vallat, F., 1996. “Nouvelle analyse des inscriptions neo-elamites”, in: Gasche H. & Hrouda B. (eds.), Collectanea Orientalia. Histoire, arts de l’espace et industrie de la terre. Etudes offertes en hommage à Agnès Spycket, Civilisations du Proche-Orient 1’ Archeologie et environnement 3, Neuchatel / Paris: 385–96.
- Idem, 2006. “Atta-hamiti-Insusinak, Shutur-Nahhunte et la chronology neo-elamite”, Akkadica 127: 59–62.
- Vanden Berghe, L., 1963. “Les reliefs élamites de Mālamir”, Iranica Antiqua 3: 22–39.
- Idem, 1984. Reliefs Rupestres de L’Iran Ancien, Musees Royaux d’art et d’Histoire, Bruxelles.
- Idem, 1986. “Donnees Nouvelles Concernant le Relief Rupestre Elamite de Kurangunr”, in: L. de Meyer, H. Gasche, and F. Vallat (eds.), Fragmenta Historiae Elamicae, Paris, pp. 157–67.
- Weissbach, F.H., 1894. Neue Beiträge zur Kunde der susischen Inschriften. Abhandlungen der Konigl. Sachsischen Gesellschaft der Wissenschaften XXIV/Phil.-hist. Klasse XIV/7, Leipzig
