= Eshkaft =

Eshkaft or Eshkoft (Persian: اشكفت) may refer to:

- Eshkaft, Fars
- Eshkaft-e Rumeh, Fars Province
- Eshkaft-e Tineh Vand, Fars Province
- Eshkaft Zun, Fars Province
- Eshkaft-e Baba Mir, Khuzestan Province
- Eshkaft-e Baraftab, Khuzestan Province
- Eshkaft-e Gav, Khuzestan Province
- Eshkaft-e Jamushi, Khuzestan Province
- Eshkaft-e Khorma, Khuzestan Province
- Eshkaft-e Mana, Khuzestan Province
- Eshkaft-e Tavileh, Khuzestan Province
- Eshkaft Gav Mishi Kuh Sorkh, Kohgiluyeh and Boyer-Ahmad Province
- Eshkaft Shah-e Sofla, Kohgiluyeh and Boyer-Ahmad Province
- Eshkaft-e Dudar, Kohgiluyeh and Boyer-Ahmad Province
- Eshkaft-e Shiri, Kohgiluyeh and Boyer-Ahmad Province
- Eshkaft-e Olya Gelal, Kohgiluyeh and Boyer-Ahmad Province
- Eshkaft-e Qateri Murzard, Kohgiluyeh and Boyer-Ahmad Province
- Eshkaft-e Salman
- Eshkaft-e Siah (disambiguation)
- Eshkaft-e Siahoo
- Eshkaft-e Zard

== See also ==
- Darreh Eshkaft (disambiguation)
- Eshgaft (disambiguation)
- Sar Eshkaft (disambiguation)
