= Eshgaft =

Eshgaft or Eshgoft (Persian: اشگفت) may refer to:

- Eshgaft-e Rumeh, Fars Province
- Eshgaft-e Baba Mir, Khuzestan Province
- Eshgaft-e Baraftab, Khuzestan Province
- Eshgaft-e Gav, Khuzestan Province
- Eshgaft-e Jamushi, Khuzestan Province
- Eshgaft-e Kahdun, Khuzestan Province
- Eshgaft-e Khorma, Khuzestan Province
- Eshgaft-e Mamadali Khan, Khuzestan Province
- Eshgaft-e Mona, Khuzestan Province
- Eshgaft-e Tavileh, Khuzestan Province
- Eshgaft-e Zard, Khuzestan Province
- Eshgaft-e Qateri, Kohgiluyeh and Boyer-Ahmad Province
- Eshgaft-e Shiri, Kohgiluyeh and Boyer-Ahmad Province
- Eshgaft-e Siah, Kohgiluyeh and Boyer-Ahmad Province

== See also ==
- Darreh Eshgaft (disambiguation)
- Eshkaft (disambiguation)
- Sar Eshgaft (disambiguation)
