= Shir Ali =

Shir Ali or Shir'ali (Persian: شيرعلي) may refer to:

- Shirali, Kermanshah
- Shir Ali, Andika, Khuzestan Province
- Shir Ali, Behbahan, Khuzestan Province
- Shir Ali, Lali, Khuzestan Province
- Shir Ali, Sistan and Baluchestan

== See also ==
- Cheshmeh-ye Shir Ali
- Khor-e Shir Ali
- Shirali
