= Darreh Barik =

Darreh Barik or Darreh-ye Barik or Darrehbarik (Persian: دره باریک) may refer to:

- Darreh Barik, Ilam
- Darreh-ye Barik, Bagh-e Malek, Khuzestan Province
- Darreh Barik, Izeh, Khuzestan Province
- Darreh Barik, Lali, Khuzestan Province
