= Harkaleh (disambiguation) =

Harkaleh is a village in Khuzestan Province, Iran.

Harkaleh (Persian: هاركله) may also refer to:

- Harkaleh-ye Mohammad Jafar
- Harkaleh-ye Mohammadabad
- Harkaleh-ye Monari
