= Sheykhi =

Sheykhi or Shaikhy female of Shaikh (Sheikh). Daughter and Wife of Shaikh.

Sheykhi (Persian: شيخي) may refer to:

- Sheykhi, Fars
- Sheykhi, Rostam, Fars Province
- Sheykhi, Khuzestan
- Jamileh Sheykhi (1930–2001), Iranian actress
