= Abu Jadan Mirza Avaz =

Abu Jadan Mirza Avaz ابوجدان ميرزاعوض
- Village
- Country: Iran
- Province: Khuzestan
- County: Lali
- Bakhsh: Central
- Rural District: Sadat

Population (2006)
  - Total: 137
- Time zone: UTC+3:30 (IRST)
  - Summer (DST): UTC+4:30 (IRDT)

Abu Jadan Mirza Avaz (Persian: ابوجدان ميرزاعوض, also Romanized as Ābū Jadān Mīrzā ʿAvaz̤) is a village in Sadat Rural District, in the Central District of Lali County, Khuzestan Province, Iran. At the 2006 census, its population was 137, in 25 families.
