= Tal Hajj Ali =

Tal Hajj Ali تل حاج علي
- Village
- Country: Iran
- Province: Khuzestan
- County: Lali
- Bakhsh: Hati
- Rural District: Hati

Population (2006)
  - Total: 115
- Time zone: UTC+3:30 (IRST)
  - Summer (DST): UTC+4:30 (IRDT)

Tal Hajj Ali (Persian: تل حاج علي, also Romanized as Tall Ḩājj ʿAlī) is a village in Hati Rural District, Hati District, Lali County, Khuzestan Province, Iran. At the 2006 census, its population was 115, in 19 families.
