= Kun Sorkh =

Ku Sorkh[k/oʊ/ s/o/r/khā/] كُوْ سرخ
- Village
- Location within Iran
- Coordinates: 32°24′55″N 49°12′12″E
- Country: Iran
- Province: Khuzestan
- County: Lali
- Bakhsh: Central
- Rural District: Sadat

Population (2006)
  - Total: 46
- Time zone: UTC+3:30 (IRST)
  - Summer (DST): UTC+4:30 (IRDT)

Kun Sorkh (Persian: كون سرخ, also Romanized as Kūn Sorkh; also known as Kon-e Sorkh and Kon Sorkh) is a village in Sadat Rural District, in the Central District of Lali County, Khuzestan Province, Iran. At the 2006 census, its population was 46, in 7 families.
