= Sarkuli =

Sarkuli سركولي
- Village
- Location within Iran
- Coordinates: 32°19′08″N 49°16′30″E
- Country: Iran
- Province: Khuzestan
- County: Lali
- Bakhsh: Central
- Rural District: Sadat

Population (2006)
  - Total: 486
- Time zone: UTC+3:30 (IRST)
  - Summer (DST): UTC+4:30 (IRDT)

Sarkuli (Persian: سركولي, also Romanized as Sarkūlī) is a village in Sadat Rural District, in the Central District of Lali County, Khuzestan Province, Iran. At the 2006 census, its population was 486, in 72 families.
