= Kul Papa =

Kul Papa كول پاپا
- Village
- Location within Iran
- Coordinates: 32°32′20″N 49°04′22″E
- Country: Iran
- Province: Khuzestan
- County: Lali
- Bakhsh: Hati
- Rural District: Jastun Shah

Population (2006)
  - Total: 119
- Time zone: UTC+3:30 (IRST)
  - Summer (DST): UTC+4:30 (IRDT)

Kul Papa (Persian: كول پاپا, also Romanized as Kūl Pāpā; also known as Kūl Bābā) is a village in Jastun Shah Rural District, Hati District, Lali County, Khuzestan Province, Iran. At the 2006 census, its population was 119, in 24 families.
