= Kulizeh Jaber =

Kulizeh Jaber كوليزه جابر
- Village
- Country: Iran
- Province: Khuzestan
- County: Lali
- Bakhsh: Hati
- Rural District: Jastun Shah

Population (2006)
  - Total: 109
- Time zone: UTC+3:30 (IRST)
  - Summer (DST): UTC+4:30 (IRDT)

Kulizeh Jaber (Persian: كوليزه جابر, also Romanized as Kūlīzeh Jāber) is a village in Jastun Shah Rural District, Hati District, Lali County, Khuzestan Province, Iran. At the 2006 census, its population was 109, in 23 families.
