= Dareshgeft =

Dareshgeft or Dareshgaft or Dar Eshgaft or Darashgoft (Persian: دراشگفت) may refer to:

- Dar Eshgaft, Ilam
- Dareshgaft, Khuzestan
- Dareshgeft, Aligudarz, Lorestan Province
- Dareshgaft, Khorramabad, Lorestan Province
- Dareshgeft, Papi, Lorestan Province
- Dar Eshgaft-e Baba Bahram, Lorestan Province

== See also ==
- Darreh Eshgoft (disambiguation)
