= Cheshmeh Ab-e Neya =

Cheshmeh Ab-e Neya چشمه اب نيا
- Village
- Country: Iran
- Province: Khuzestan
- County: Lali
- Bakhsh: Hati
- Rural District: Hati

Population (2006)
  - Total: 45
- Time zone: UTC+3:30 (IRST)
  - Summer (DST): UTC+4:30 (IRDT)

Cheshmeh Ab-e Neya (Persian: چشمه اب نيا, also Romanized as Cheshmeh Āb-e Neyā) is a village in Hati Rural District, Hati District, Lali County, Khuzestan Province, Iran. At the 2006 census, its population was 45, in 9 families.
