= Keft, Iran =

Keft (Persian: كفت), in Iran, may refer to:

- Keft-e Nashalil
- Keft Gol Anbar
- Keft Kalkhanek
