= Cham Lavand =

Cham Lavand چم لوند
- Village
- Location within Iran
- Coordinates: 32°15′06″N 49°08′16″E
- Country: Iran
- Province: Khuzestan
- County: Lali
- Bakhsh: Central
- Rural District: Dasht-e Lali

Population (2006)
  - Total: 89
- Time zone: UTC+3:30 (IRST)
  - Summer (DST): UTC+4:30 (IRDT)

Cham Lavand (Persian: چم لوند, also Romanized as Cham-e Lavand and Chamlovand) is a village in Dasht-e Lali Rural District, in the Central District of Lali County, Khuzestan Province, Iran. At the 2006 census, its population was 89, in 17 families.
