= Rag-e Halil =

Rag-e Halil رگ هليل
- Village
- Location within Iran
- Coordinates: 32°12′16″N 49°14′38″E
- Country: Iran
- Province: Khuzestan
- County: Lali
- Bakhsh: Central
- Rural District: Dasht-e Lali

Population (2006)
  - Total: 49
- Time zone: UTC+3:30 (IRST)
  - Summer (DST): UTC+4:30 (IRDT)

Rag-e Halil (Persian: رگ هليل, also Romanized as Rag-e Halīl; also known as Kūh-e Halīl) is a village in Dasht-e Lali Rural District, in the Central District of Lali County, Khuzestan Province, Iran. At the 2006 census, its population was 49, in 5 families.
