= Kul Khodadad =

Kul Khodadad كول خداداد
- Village
- Country: Iran
- Province: Khuzestan
- County: Lali
- Bakhsh: Hati
- Rural District: Hati

Population (2006)
  - Total: 55
- Time zone: UTC+3:30 (IRST)
  - Summer (DST): UTC+4:30 (IRDT)

Kul Khodadad (Persian: كول خداداد, also Romanized as Kūl Khodādād) is a village in Hati Rural District, Hati District, Lali County, Khuzestan Province, Iran. As of the 2006 census, its population was 55 people in 7 families.
