= Taluk, Iran =

Taluk asnaki تلوك آباد اسنکی
- Village
- Location within Iran
- Coordinates: 32°17′23″N 49°13′34″E
- Country: Iran
- Province: Khuzestan
- County: Lali
- Bakhsh: Central
- Rural District: Sadat

Population
  - Total: 56
- Time zone: UTC+3:30 (IRST)
  - Summer (DST): UTC+4:30 (IRDT)

Taluk asnaki (Persian: تلوك, also Romanized as Talūk) is a village in Sadat Rural District, in the Central District of Lali County, Khuzestan Province, Iran. At the 2006 census, its population was 56, in 12 families.
