= Nesar-e Sipeh =

Nesar-e Sipeh نثارسيپه
- Village
- Country: Iran
- Province: Khuzestan
- County: Lali
- Bakhsh: Hati
- Rural District: Hati

Population (2006)
  - Total: 73
- Time zone: UTC+3:30 (IRST)
  - Summer (DST): UTC+4:30 (IRDT)

Nesar-e Sipeh (Persian: نثارسيپه, also Romanized as Nes̱ār-e Sīpeh) is a village in Hati Rural District, Hati District, Lali County, Khuzestan Province, Iran. At the 2006 census, its population was 73, in 11 families.
