= Bard-e Gazhdi =

Bard-e Gazhdi بردگژدي
- Village
- Location within Iran
- Coordinates: 32°34′00″N 49°17′00″E
- Country: Iran
- Province: Khuzestan
- County: Lali
- Bakhsh: Hati
- Rural District: Hati

Population (2006)
  - Total: 97
- Time zone: UTC+3:30 (IRST)
  - Summer (DST): UTC+4:30 (IRDT)

Bard-e Gazhdi (Persian: بردگژدي, also Romanized as Bard-e Gazhdī) is a village in Hati Rural District, Hati District, Lali County, Khuzestan Province, Iran. At the 2006 census, its population was 97, in 19 families.
