= Qaleh-ye Harateh =

Qaleh-ye Harateh قلعه حرته
- Village
- Country: Iran
- Province: Khuzestan
- County: Lali
- Bakhsh: Hati
- Rural District: Hati

Population (2006)
  - Total: 90
- Time zone: UTC+3:30 (IRST)
  - Summer (DST): UTC+4:30 (IRDT)

Qaleh-ye Harateh (Persian: قلعه حرته, also Romanized as Qal‘eh-ye Ḩarateh) is a village in Hati Rural District, Hati District, Lali County, Khuzestan Province, Iran. At the 2006 census, its population was 90, in 20 families.
