= Sikvand =

Sikvand سيكوند
- Village
- Location within Iran
- Coordinates: 32°26′06″N 49°03′20″E
- Country: Iran
- Province: Khuzestan
- County: Lali
- Bakhsh: Hati
- Rural District: Jastun Shah

Population (2006)
  - Total: 171
- Time zone: UTC+3:30 (IRST)
  - Summer (DST): UTC+4:30 (IRDT)

Sikvand (Persian: سيكوند, also Romanized as Sīkvand) is a village in Jastun Shah Rural District, Hati District, Lali County, Khuzestan Province, Iran. At the 2006 census, its population was 171, in 30 families.
