= Faryab-e Masjid =

Faryab-e Masjid فارياب مسجد
- Village
- Country: Iran
- Province: Khuzestan
- County: Lali
- Bakhsh: Hati
- Rural District: Hati

Population (2006)
  - Total: 389
- Time zone: UTC+3:30 (IRST)
  - Summer (DST): UTC+4:30 (IRDT)

Faryab-e Masjid (Persian: فارياب مسجد, also Romanized as Fāryāb-e Masjid) is a village in Hati Rural District, Hati District, Lali County, Khuzestan Province, Iran. At the 2006 census, its population was 389, in 59 families.
