= Ab Jaz =

Ab Jaz or Abjaz (Persian: ابجاز) may refer to:

- Ab Jaz, Izeh
- Abjaz, Lali
- Abjaz, Hati, Lali County
