= Naseh-ye Tanbaku Kar =

Naseh-ye Tanbaku Kar نسه تنباكوكار
- Village
- Country: Iran
- Province: Khuzestan
- County: Lali
- Bakhsh: Hati
- Rural District: Jastun Shah

Population (2006)
  - Total: 110
- Time zone: UTC+3:30 (IRST)
  - Summer (DST): UTC+4:30 (IRDT)

Naseh-ye Tanbaku Kar (Persian: نسه تنباكوكار, also Romanized as Naseh-ye Tanbāḵū Kār) is a village in Jastun Shah Rural District, Hati District, Lali County, Khuzestan Province, Iran. At the 2006 census, its population was 110, in 17 families.
