= Ab Malek =

Ab Malek اب ملك
- Village
- Country: Iran
- Province: Khuzestan
- County: Lali
- Bakhsh: Hati
- Rural District: Jastun Shah

Population (2006)
  - Total: 92
- Time zone: UTC+3:30 (IRST)
  - Summer (DST): UTC+4:30 (IRDT)

Ab Malek (Persian: اب ملك, also Romanized as Āb Maleḵ) is a village in Jastun Shah Rural District, Hati District, Lali County, Khuzestan province, Iran. At the 2006 census, its population was 92, in 18 families.
