= Pakurpi-ye Sofla =

Pakurpi-ye Sofla پاكورپي سفلي
- Village
- Country: Iran
- Province: Khuzestan
- County: Lali
- Bakhsh: Hati
- Rural District: Hati

Population (2006)
  - Total: 119
- Time zone: UTC+3:30 (IRST)
  - Summer (DST): UTC+4:30 (IRDT)

Pakurpi-ye Sofla (Persian: پاكورپي سفلي, also Romanized as Pāḵūrpī-ye Soflá) is a village in Hati Rural District, Hati District, Lali County, Khuzestan Province, Iran. At the 2006 census, its population was 119, in 19 families.
