= Qaleh-ye Changai =

Qaleh-ye Changai قلعه چنگايي
- Village
- Location within Iran
- Coordinates: 32°20′00″N 49°03′00″E
- Country: Iran
- Province: Khuzestan
- County: Lali
- Bakhsh: Central
- Rural District: Dasht-e Lali

Population (2006)
  - Total: 808
- Time zone: UTC+3:30 (IRST)
  - Summer (DST): UTC+4:30 (IRDT)

Qaleh-ye Changai (Persian: قلعه چنگايي, also Romanized as Qal‘eh-ye Changā’ī; also known as Changā’ī) is a village in Dasht-e Lali Rural District, in the Central District of Lali County, Khuzestan Province, Iran. At the 2006 census, its population was 808, in 116 families.
