= Chal Shahrgariveh =

Chal Shahrgariveh چال شهرگريوه
- Village
- Country: Iran
- Province: Khuzestan
- County: Lali
- Bakhsh: Central
- Rural District: Sadat

Population (2006)
  - Total: 95
- Time zone: UTC+3:30 (IRST)
  - Summer (DST): UTC+4:30 (IRDT)

Chal Shahrgariveh (Persian: چال شهرگريوه, also Romanized as Chāl Shahrgarīveh) is a village in Sadat Rural District, in the Central District of Lali County, Khuzestan Province, Iran. At the 2006 census, its population was 95, in 18 families.
