= Lir Kuyu-ye Now =

Lir Kuyu-ye Now ليركويونو
- Village
- Country: Iran
- Province: Khuzestan
- County: Lali
- Bakhsh: Central
- Rural District: Sadat

Population (2006)
  - Total: 35
- Time zone: UTC+3:30 (IRST)
  - Summer (DST): UTC+4:30 (IRDT)

Lir Kuyu-ye Now (Persian: ليركويونو, also Romanized as Līr Kūyū-ye Now) is a village in Sadat Rural District, in the Central District of Lali County, Khuzestan Province, Iran. At the 2006 census, its population was 35, in 4 families.
