= Dul Taher =

Dul Taher دول طاهر
- Village
- Location within Iran
- Coordinates: 32°34′00″N 49°03′00″E
- Country: Iran
- Province: Khuzestan
- County: Lali
- Bakhsh: Hati
- Rural District: Jastun Shah

Population (2006)
  - Total: 98
- Time zone: UTC+3:30 (IRST)
  - Summer (DST): UTC+4:30 (IRDT)

Dul Taher (Persian: دول طاهر, also Romanized as Dūl Ţāher) is a village in Jastun Shah Rural District, Hati District, Lali County, Khuzestan Province, Iran. At the 2006 census, its population was 98, in 24 families.
