= Hoseyn Aqa =

Hoseyn Aqa حسين اقا
- Village
- Country: Iran
- Province: Khuzestan
- County: Lali
- Bakhsh: Hati
- Rural District: Jastun Shah

Population (2006)
  - Total: 104
- Time zone: UTC+3:30 (IRST)
  - Summer (DST): UTC+4:30 (IRDT)

Hoseyn Aqa (Persian: حسين اقا, also Romanized as Ḩoseyn Āqā) is a village in Jastun Shah Rural District, Hati District, Lali County, Khuzestan Province, Iran. At the 2006 census, its population was 104, in 21 families.
