= Posht-e Taqehai Chahar Bisheh =

Posht-e Taqehai Chahar Bisheh پشت طاقهاي چهاربيشه
- Village
- Country: Iran
- Province: Khuzestan
- County: Lali
- Bakhsh: Hati
- Rural District: Jastun Shah

Population (2006)
  - Total: 26
- Time zone: UTC+3:30 (IRST)
  - Summer (DST): UTC+4:30 (IRDT)

Posht-e Taqehai Chahar Bisheh (Persian: پشت طاقهاي چهاربيشه, also romanized as Posht-e Tāqehāī Chahār Bīsheh) is a village in Jastun Shah Rural District, Hati District, Lali County, Khuzestan Province, Iran. At the 2006 census, its population was 26, in 4 families.
