= Tang-e Tahak =

Tang-e Tahak تنگ طاهك
- Village
- Location within Iran
- Coordinates: 32°18′00″N 49°14′00″E
- Country: Iran
- Province: Khuzestan
- County: Lali
- Bakhsh: Central
- Rural District: Sadat

Population (2006)
  - Total: 16
- Time zone: UTC+3:30 (IRST)
  - Summer (DST): UTC+4:30 (IRDT)

Tang-e Tahak (Persian: تنگ طاهك, also Romanized as Tang-e Ţāhak) is a village in Sadat Rural District, in the Central District of Lali County, Khuzestan Province, Iran. At the 2006 census, its population was 16, in 4 families.
