= Benvar, Lali =

Benvar بنوار
- Village
- Location within Iran
- Coordinates: 32°28′49″N 49°06′58″E
- Country: Iran
- Province: Khuzestan
- County: Lali
- Bakhsh: Hati
- Rural District: Jastun Shah

Population (2006)
  - Total: 39
- Time zone: UTC+3:30 (IRST)
  - Summer (DST): UTC+4:30 (IRDT)

Benvar (Persian: بنوار, also Romanized as Benvār and Bonvār; also known as Boneh Vār) is a village in Jastun Shah Rural District, Hati District, Lali County, Khuzestan Province, Iran. At the 2006 census, its population was 39, in 7 families.
