= Seh Lor =

Seh Lor سه لر
- Village
- Location within Iran
- Coordinates: 32°22′14″N 49°13′42″E
- Country: Iran
- Province: Khuzestan
- County: Lali
- Bakhsh: Central
- Rural District: Sadat

Population (2006)
  - Total: 310
- Time zone: UTC+3:30 (IRST)
  - Summer (DST): UTC+4:30 (IRDT)

Seh Lor (Persian: سه لر; also known as Seh Lozh) is a village in Sadat Rural District, in the Central District of Lali County, Khuzestan Province, Iran. At the 2006 census, its population was 310, in 55 families.
