= Tatar, Khuzestan =

Village in Khuzestan province, Iran

Tatar Persian: ططر
- Village
- Location within Iran
- Coordinates: 32°21′46″N 49°02′48″E
- Country: Iran
- Province: Khuzestan
- County: Lali
- District: Central
- Rural District: Dasht-e Lali

Population (2016)
  - Total: 870
- Time zone: UTC+3:30 (IRST)

Tatar (Persian: ططر) (Note: Also romanized as Ţaṭar) is a village in, and the capital of, Dasht-e Lali Rural District of the Central District of Lali County, Khuzestan province, Iran.

== Demographics ==
=== Population ===
At the time of the 2006 National Census, the village's population was 947 in 152 households. The following census in 2011 counted 999 people in 210 households. The 2016 census measured the population of the village as 870 people in 208 households.
