= Abjaz, Hati =

Abjaz ابجاز
- Village
- Location within Iran
- Coordinates: 32°05′17″N 49°42′03″E
- Country: Iran
- Province: Khuzestan
- County: Lali
- Bakhsh: Hati
- Rural District: Jastun Shah

Population (2006)
  - Total: 34
- Time zone: UTC+3:30 (IRST)
  - Summer (DST): UTC+4:30 (IRDT)

Abjaz (Persian: ابجاز, also Romanized as Ābjāz) is a village in Jastun Shah Rural District, Hati District, Lali County, Khuzestan Province, Iran. At the 2006 census, its population was 34, in 6 families.
