= Darreh Barik, Lali =

Darreh Barik دره باريك
- Village
- Country: Iran
- Province: Khuzestan
- County: Lali
- Bakhsh: Hati
- Rural District: Hati

Population (2006)
  - Total: 73
- Time zone: UTC+3:30 (IRST)
  - Summer (DST): UTC+4:30 (IRDT)

Darreh Barik (Persian: دره باريك, also Romanized as Darreh Bārīk) is a village in Hati Rural District, Hati District, Lali County, Khuzestan Province, Iran. In the 2006 census, it was found that the population was 73, in 15 families.
