= Galeh Bardar, Khuzestan =

Galeh Bardar گله بردر
- Village
- Country: Iran
- Province: Khuzestan
- County: Lali
- Bakhsh: Central
- Rural District: Sadat

Population (2006)
  - Total: 45
- Time zone: UTC+3:30 (IRST)
  - Summer (DST): UTC+4:30 (IRDT)

Galeh Bardar (Persian: گله بردر) is a village in Sadat Rural District, in the Central District of Lali County, Khuzestan Province, Iran. At the 2006 census, its population was 45, in 9 families.
