= Valiabad, Lali =

Village in Khuzestan province, Iran

Valiabad Persian: ولي اباد
- Village
- Location within Iran
- Coordinates: 32°27′33″N 49°06′04″E
- Country: Iran
- Province: Khuzestan
- County: Lali
- District: Hati
- Rural District: Jastun Shah

Population (2016)
  - Total: 64
- Time zone: UTC+3:30 (IRST)

Valiabad (Persian: ولي اباد) (Note: Also romanized as Valīābād) is a village in, and the capital of, Jastun Shah Rural District of Hati District, Lali County, Khuzestan province, Iran.

== Demographics ==
=== Population ===
At the time of the 2006 National Census, the village's population was 67 in 10 households. The following census in 2011 counted 91 people in 19 households. The 2016 census measured the population of the village as 64 people in 17 households.
