= Khvajehabad =

Khvajehabad or Khajeh Abad (Persian: خواجه اباد) may refer to:

- Khvajehabad, Kerman
- Khvajehabad, Khuzestan
- Khvajehabad, Razavi Khorasan
