= Ab Maik-e Golzari =

Ab Maik-e Golzari اب مايك گلزاري
- Village
- Location within Iran
- Coordinates: 32°14′35″N 49°12′02″E
- Country: Iran
- Province: Khuzestan
- County: Lali
- Bakhsh: Central
- Rural District: Dasht-e Lali

Population (2006)
  - Total: 61
- Time zone: UTC+3:30 (IRST)
  - Summer (DST): UTC+4:30 (IRDT)

Ab Maik-e Golzari (Persian: اب مايك گلزاري, also Romanized as Āb Mā’īk-e Golzārī; also known as Golzārī) is a village in Dasht-e Lali Rural District, in the Central District of Lali County, Khuzestan province, Iran. At the 2006 census, its population was 61, in 10 families.
