= Gandomriz, Lali =

Gandomriz گندم ريز
- Village
- Location within Iran
- Coordinates: 32°10′47″N 49°14′22″E
- Country: Iran
- Province: Khuzestan
- County: Lali
- Bakhsh: Central
- Rural District: Dasht-e Lali

Population (2006)
  - Total: 24
- Time zone: UTC+3:30 (IRST)
  - Summer (DST): UTC+4:30 (IRDT)

Gandomriz (Persian: گندم ريز, also Romanized as Gandomrīz; also known as Kandowmrīz) is a village in Dasht-e Lali Rural District, in the Central District of Lali County, Khuzestan Province, Iran. At the 2006 census, its population was 24, in 5 families.
