= Darreh-ye Eshkaft =

Darreh-ye Eshkaft or Darreh Eshkaft (Persian: دره اشكفت) may refer to:

- Darreh-ye Eshkaft, Lorestan
- Darreh Eshkaft-e Bala, Khuzestan Province
- Darreh Eshkaft-e Sarak, Khuzestan Province

== See also ==
- Darreh Eshgaft (disambiguation)
