= Chal Bardar =

Chal Bardar or Chal Bar Dar (Persian: چال بردر) may refer to:

- Chal Bardar, Izeh
- Chal Bardar, Lali
