= Jan Ali =

Jan Ali or Jan'ali (Persian: جانعلي) may refer to:

- Jan Ali, Kermanshah
- Jan Ali, Khuzestan
- Jan Ali, Sistan and Baluchestan
