= Farajabad, Lali =

Farajabad فرج اباد
- Village
- Location within Iran
- Coordinates: 32°28′31″N 49°07′19″E
- Country: Iran
- Province: Khuzestan
- County: Lali
- Bakhsh: Hati
- Rural District: Hati

Population (2006)
  - Total: 95
- Time zone: UTC+3:30 (IRST)
  - Summer (DST): UTC+4:30 (IRDT)

Farajabad (Persian: فرج اباد, also Romanized as Farajābād; also known as Eshkaft-e Manā) is a village in Hati Rural District, Hati District, Lali County, Khuzestan Province, Iran. At the 2006 census, its population was 95, in 15 families.
