= Keft Gol Anbar =

Keft Gol Anbar كفت گل انبار
- Village
- Country: Iran
- Province: Khuzestan
- County: Lali
- Bakhsh: Central
- Rural District: Dasht-e Lali

Population (2006)
  - Total: 33
- Time zone: UTC+3:30 (IRST)
  - Summer (DST): UTC+4:30 (IRDT)

Keft Gol Anbar (Persian: كفت گل انبار, also Romanized as Keft Gol Ānbār) is a village in Dasht-e Lali Rural District, in the Central District of Lali County, Khuzestan Province, Iran. At the 2006 census, its population was 33, in 5 families.
