= Chiti, Khuzestan =

Chiti چيتي
- Village
- Location within Iran
- Coordinates: 32°17′18″N 49°12′44″E
- Country: Iran
- Province: Khuzestan
- County: Lali
- Bakhsh: Central
- Rural District: Sadat

Population (2006)
  - Total: 97
- Time zone: UTC+3:30 (IRST)
  - Summer (DST): UTC+4:30 (IRDT)

Chiti (Persian: چيتي, also Romanized as Chītī; also known as Qal‘eh Chetī and Qal‘eh Chītī) is a village in Sadat Rural District, in the Central District of Lali County, Khuzestan province, Iran. At the 2006 census, its population was 97, in 14 families.
