= Harkaleh-ye Mohammadabad =

Harkaleh-ye Mohammadabad هاركله محمداباد
- Village
- Location within Iran
- Coordinates: 32°19′54″N 49°18′01″E
- Country: Iran
- Province: Khuzestan
- County: Lali
- Bakhsh: Central
- Rural District: Sadat

Population (2006)
  - Total: 113
- Time zone: UTC+3:30 (IRST)
  - Summer (DST): UTC+4:30 (IRDT)

Harkaleh-ye Mohammadabad (Persian: هاركله محمداباد, also Romanized as Hārkaleh-ye Moḩammadābād; also known as Maḩmūdābād and Shahrak-e Hārkaleh) is a village in Sadat Rural District, in the Central District of Lali County, Khuzestan Province, Iran. At the 2006 census, its population was 113, in 17 families.
