= Harkaleh-ye Mohammad Jafar =

Harkaleh-ye Mohammad Jafar هاركله محمدجعفر
- Village
- Location within Iran
- Coordinates: 32°19′00″N 49°19′00″E
- Country: Iran
- Province: Khuzestan
- County: Lali
- Bakhsh: Central
- Rural District: Sadat

Population (2006)
  - Total: 137
- Time zone: UTC+3:30 (IRST)
  - Summer (DST): UTC+4:30 (IRDT)

Harkaleh-ye Mohammad Jafar (Persian: هاركله محمدجعفر, also Romanized as Hārkaleh-ye Moḩammad Ja‘far) is a village in Sadat Rural District, in the Central District of Lali County, Khuzestan Province, Iran. At the 2006 census, its population was 137, in 21 families.
