= Gach Gorsa =

Village in Khuzestan province, Iran

Gach Gorsa Persian: گچ گرسا
- Village
- Location within Iran
- Coordinates: 32°25′24″N 48°58′34″E
- Country: Iran
- Province: Khuzestan
- County: Lali
- District: Central
- Rural District: Dasht-e Lali

Population (2016)
  - Total: 1,182
- Time zone: UTC+3:30 (IRST)

Gach Gorsa (Persian: گچ گرسا) (Note: Also romanized as Gach Gorsā; also known as Gach Kersā) is a village in Dasht-e Lali Rural District of the Central District of Lali County, Khuzestan province, Iran.

== Demographics ==
=== Population ===
At the time of the 2006 National Census, the village's population was 1,618 in 222 households. The following census in 2011 counted 1,613 people in 352 households. The 2016 census measured the population of the village as 1,182 people in 274 households. It was the most populous village in its rural district.
