= Hati, Iran =

Village in Khuzestan province, Iran

Hati Persian: هتي
- Village
- Location within Iran
- Coordinates: 32°30′09″N 49°10′09″E
- Country: Iran
- Province: Khuzestan
- County: Lali
- District: Hati
- Rural District: Hati

Population (2016)
  - Total: 54
- Time zone: UTC+3:30 (IRST)

Hati (Persian: هتي) (Note: Also romanized as Hatī; also known as Tang-e Ḩatī) is a village in, and the capital of, Hati Rural District of Hati District, Lali County, Khuzestan province, Iran.

== Demographics ==
=== Population ===
At the time of the 2006 National Census, the village's population was 186 in 33 households. The following census in 2011 counted 41 people in nine households. The 2016 census measured the population of the village as 54 people in 11 households.
