= Menazel Sazmani =

Menazel Sazmani or Manazel Sazmani (Persian: منازل سازماني) may refer to:

- Menazel Sazmani, Bagh-e Malek
- Manazel Sazmani, Lali
