= Darreh Buri =

Village in Khuzestan province, Iran

Darreh Buri Persian: دره بوري
- Village
- Location within Iran
- Coordinates: 32°23′22″N 49°14′32″E
- Country: Iran
- Province: Khuzestan
- County: Lali
- District: Central
- Rural District: Sadat

Population (2016)
  - Total: 1,330
- Time zone: UTC+3:30 (IRST)

Darreh Buri (Persian: دره بوري) (Note: Also romanized as Darreh Būrī) is a village in, and the capital of, Sadat Rural District of the Central District of Lali County, Khuzestan province, Iran.

== Demographics ==
=== Population ===
At the time of the 2006 National Census, the village's population was 1,040 in 196 households. The following census in 2011 counted 1,533 people in 296 households. The 2016 census measured the population of the village as 1,330 people in 290 households. It was the most populous village in its rural district.
