= Chini =

Chini چینی
- Village
- Location within Iran
- Coordinates: 32°25′13″N 49°13′09″E
- Country: Iran
- Province: Khuzestan
- County: Lali
- Bakhsh: Central
- Rural District: Sadat

Population (2006)
  - Total: 161
- Time zone: UTC+3:30 (IRST)
  - Summer (DST): UTC+4:30 (IRDT)

Chini (Persian: چینی, also Romanized as Chīnī; also known as Chaman Galleh) is a village in Sadat Rural District, in the Central District of Lali County, Khuzestan Province, Iran. At the 2006 census, its population was 161, in 36 families.
