= Darreh Eshgoft =

Darreh Eshgoft or Darreh Eshgoft or Darreh Eshgaft or Darreh-ye Eshgaft (Persian: دره اشگفت) may refer to:

- Darreh-ye Eshgaft, Chaharmahal and Bakhtiari
- Darreh Eshgoft, Hormozgan
- Darreh Eshgaft, Izeh, Khuzestan Province
- Darreh Eshgaft, Lorestan
- Darreh Eshgoft, South Khorasan

== See also ==
- Dareshgeft (disambiguation)
- Darreh Eshkaft (disambiguation)
