= Soltanabad, Lali =

Village in Khuzestan province, Iran

Soltanabad Persian: سلطان اباد
- Village
- Country: Iran
- Province: Khuzestan
- County: Lali
- District: Hati
- Rural District: Hati

Population (2016)
  - Total: 396
- Time zone: UTC+3:30 (IRST)

Soltanabad (Persian: سلطان اباد) (Note: Also romanized as Solṭānābād) is a village in Hati Rural District of Hati District, Lali County, Khuzestan province, Iran.

== Demographics ==
=== Population ===
At the time of the 2006 National Census, the village's population was 260 in 42 households. The following census in 2011 counted 380 people in 67 households. The 2016 census measured the population of the village as 396 people in 72 households. It was the most populous village in its rural district.
