= Khvajehabad, Khuzestan =

Khvajehabad خواجه اباد
- Village
- Location within Iran
- Coordinates: 31°53′14″N 49°20′04″E
- Country: Iran
- Province: Khuzestan
- County: Lali
- Bakhsh: Central
- Rural District: Dasht-e Lali

Population (2006)
  - Total: 491
- Time zone: UTC+3:30 (IRST)
  - Summer (DST): UTC+4:30 (IRDT)

Khvajehabad (Persian: خواجه اباد, also romanized as Khvājehābād and Khājeh Ābād) is a village in Dasht-e Lali Rural District, in the Central District of Lali County, Khuzestan Province, Iran. At the 2006 census, its population was 491, in 88 families.
