= Sar Eshgaft =

Sar Eshgaft or Sar Eshkaft or Sareshgaft or Sar Eshkoft (Persian: سراشكفت or سراشگفت) may refer to:

- Sar Eshkaft, Andimeshk
- Sar Eshkoft, Bagh-e Malek
- Sar Eshgaft-e Daraki
- Sar Eshgaft, Dezful
