= Manazel Sazmani, Lali =

Manazel Sazmani منازل سازماني
- Village
- Country: Iran
- Province: Khuzestan
- County: Lali
- Bakhsh: Central
- Rural District: Dasht-e Lali

Population (2006)
  - Total: 114
- Time zone: UTC+3:30 (IRST)
  - Summer (DST): UTC+4:30 (IRDT)

Manazel Sazmani (Persian: منازل سازماني, also Romanized as Manāzel Sāzmānī) is a village in Dasht-e Lali Rural District, in the Central District of Lali County, Khuzestan Province, Iran. At the 2006 census, its population was 114, in 25 families.
