= Eshkaft-e Siah =

Eshkaft-e Siah or Eshkaft Siah or Eshkoft-e Siah (Persian: اشكفت سياه) may refer to:

- Eshkaft-e Siah, Hormozgan
- Eshkaft Siah, Boyer-Ahmad, Kohgiluyeh and Boyer-Ahmad Province
- Eshkaft Siah, Charam, Kohgiluyeh and Boyer-Ahmad Province
