= Chini (state constituency) =

Political subdivision in Malaysia

Chini (N23)
Pahang constituency

State constituency
- Legislature: Pahang State Legislative Assembly
MLA
Mohd Sharim Md Zain
BN
- Constituency created: 1974
- Constituency abolished: 1986
- Constituency re-created: 1994
- First contested: 1974
- Last contested: 2022

Demographics
- Electors (2022): 26,121

Chini is a state constituency in Pahang, Malaysia, that has been represented in the Pahang State Legislative Assembly.

== Demographics ==
Ethnic breakdown of Chini's electorate as of 2022
1. Malay (88.1%)
2. Other ethnicities (11.5%)
3. Chinese (0.28%)
4. Indian (0.10%)

== History ==
=== Polling districts ===
According to the federal gazette issued on 31 October 2022, the Chini constituency is divided into 13 polling districts.

State constituency	Polling district	Code	Location
Chini (N23)	Terpai	085/23/01	SK Kinchir
Chini (N23)	Salong	085/23/02	Dewan Mempelas Kampung Baru PPSK Salong Mukim Penyor 1
Chini (N23)	Mambang	085/23/03	SK Mambang
Chini (N23)	Paloh Hinai	085/23/04	SMK Paloh Hinai
Chini (N23)	Kampung Dusun	085/23/05	Balai Raya Dan Perpustakaan Desa Kampung Dusun
Chini (N23)	FELDA Chini Timur 3 & 4	085/23/06	SK LKTP Chini Timur 2
Chini (N23)	FELDA Chini Timur 1	085/23/07	SK LKTP Chini Timur 1
Chini (N23)	FELDA Chini Timur 2	085/23/08	SMK Chini Timur
Chini (N23)	FELDA Chini 5	085/23/09	SK LKTP Chini 3 & 5
Chini (N23)	FELDA Chini 4	085/23/10	SK LKTP Chini 1 & 4
Chini (N23)	FELDA Chini 1	085/23/11	SA Rakyat (KAFA) Nur Ilham FELDA Chini 1
Chini (N23)	FELDA Chini 2	085/23/12	SMK Chini 2
Chini (N23)	FELDA Chini 3	085/23/13	KAFA Kelas Al-Quran Dan Fardu Ain FELDA Chini 03; Dewan Semai Bakti Kg. FELDA Chini 3

=== Representation history ===
Members of Pahang State Legislature Assembly for Chini
Assemnbly	No	Years	Member	Party
Constituency created from Pahang Tua
Chini
4th	N25	1974 - 1978	Mohammed Abdul Ghani	BN (UMNO)
5th	N25	1978 - 1982	Mohammed Abdul Ghani	BN (UMNO)
6th	N25	1982 - 1986	Wan Mohamad Razali Wan Mahussin	BN (UMNO)
Cini
7th	N31	1986 - 1990	Wan Mohamad Razali Wan Mahussin	BN (UMNO)
8th	N31	1990 - 1995	Wan Mohamad Razali Wan Mahussin	BN (UMNO)
9th	N20	1995–1999	Wan Mohamad Razali Wan Mahussin	BN (UMNO)
10th	N20	1999–2004	Mohd Jafri Ab Rashid	KeADILan
Chini
11th	N23	2004–2008	Abu Bakar Harun	BN (UMNO)
12th	N23	2008–2013	Abu Bakar Harun	BN (UMNO)
13th	N23	2013–2018	Abu Bakar Harun	BN (UMNO)
14th	N23	2018–2020	Abu Bakar Harun	BN (UMNO)
14th	N23	2020–2022	Mohd Sharim Md Zain	BN (UMNO)
15th	N23	2022–present	Mohd Sharim Md Zain	BN (UMNO)

== Election results ==
Pahang state election, 2022
Party	Candidate	Votes	%	∆%
BN	Mohd Sharim Md Zain	10,588	53.25	▼37.83
PN	Fahrur Rozi Jalaluddin	8,463	42.56	▲42.56
PH	Mohamad Yazid Che Mat	833	4.19	▲4.19
Total valid votes		19,884	100.00	
Total rejected ballots		320		
Unreturned ballots		40		
Turnout		20,244	76.12	▲2.25
Registered electors		26,121		
Majority		2,125	10.69	▼72.37
BN hold		Swing		

Pahang state by-election, 2020 Upon the death of the incumbent, Abu Bakar Harun
Party	Candidate	Votes	%	∆%
BN	Mohd Sharim Md Zain	13,872	91.08	▲30.3
Independent	Tengku Zainul Hisham Tengku Hussin	1,222	8.02	▲8.02
Independent	Mohd Shukri Mohd Ramli	137	0.90	▲0.90
Total valid votes		15,231	100.00	
Total rejected ballots		239		
Unreturned ballots		36		
Turnout		15,506	73.87	▼5.18
Registered electors		20,990		
Majority		12,650	83.06	▲55.04
BN hold		Swing		
Source(s): 1. "His Majesty's Government Gazette - Notice of Contested Election, By-election of State Legislative Assembly of N.23 Chini for the State of Pahang [P.U. (B) 287/2020]" (PDF). Attorney General's Chambers of Malaysia. 22 June 2020.; 2. "Federal Government Gazette - Results of Contested Election and Statements of the Poll after the Official Addition of Votes for the By-election of N.23 Chini [P.U. (B) 320/2020]" (PDF). Attorney General's Chambers of Malaysia. 6 July 2020.

Pahang state election, 2018: Chini (state constituency)
Party	Candidate	Votes	%	∆%
BN	Abu Bakar Harun	10,027	60.78	▼11.85
PAS	Mohd.Fadhil Noor Abdul Karim	5,405	32.76	▲4.78
PKR	Mohd.Razali Ithnain	1,065	6.46	▼19.05
Total valid votes		16,497	100.00	
Total rejected ballots		232		
Unreturned ballots		69		
Turnout		16,798	79.05	▼5.57
Registered electors		21,251		
Majority		4,622	28.02	▼19.10
BN hold		Swing		
Source(s): 1. "His Majesty's Government Gazette - Notice of Contested Election, State Legislative Assembly for the State of Pahang [P.U. (B) 254/2018]" (PDF). Attorney General's Chambers of Malaysia. 3 May 2018.; 2. "Federal Government Gazette - Results of Contested Election and Statements of the Poll after the Official Addition of Votes, State Constituencies for the State of Pahang [P.U. (B) 328/2018]" (PDF). Attorney General's Chambers of Malaysia. 28 May 2018.

Pahang state election, 2013: Chini (state constituency)
Party	Candidate	Votes	%	∆%
BN	Abu Bakar Harun	11,829	72.63	▲0.61
PKR	Sitarunisah Abdul Kadir	4,154	25.51	▲25.51
Total valid votes		15,983	100.00	
Total rejected ballots		303	2	
Unreturned ballots		18		
Turnout		16,286	84.62	▲2.79
Registered electors		19,247		
Majority		7,675	47.12	▲3.08
BN hold		Swing		
Source(s): 1. "undi.info-CHINI (P85-N23)". MalaysiaKini. 2020. Archived from the original on 22 July 2020.

Pahang state election, 2008: Chini (state constituency)
Party	Candidate	Votes	%	∆%
BN	Abu Bakar Harun	7,398	72.02	▲2.16
PAS	Mohd.Fadhil Noor Abdul Karim	2,874	27.98	▲27.98
Total valid votes		10,272	100.00	
Total rejected ballots		249		
Unreturned ballots		18		
Turnout		10,539	81.97	▼1.96
Registered electors		12,857		
Majority		4,524	44.04	▲1.08
BN hold		Swing		
Source(s): 1. "undi.info-CHINI (P85-N23)". MalaysiaKini. 2020. Archived from the original on 22 July 2020.

Pahang state election, 2004: Chini (state constituency)
Party	Candidate	Votes	%	∆%
BN	Abu Bakar Harun	6,664	69.86	▲21.51
PKR	Mohd Jafri Ab. Rashid	2,659	27.52	▲28.52
Total valid votes		9,323	100.00	
Total rejected ballots		190		
Unreturned ballots		26		
Turnout		9,539	83.93	▲8.65
Registered electors		11,365		
Majority		4,005	42.96	▲42.90
BN gain from PKR		Swing		?
Source(s): 1. "undi.info-CHINI (P85-N23)". MalaysiaKini. 2020. Archived from the original on 22 July 2020.

Pahang state election, 1999: Cini
Party	Candidate	Votes	%	∆%
PKR	Mohd Jafri Ab Rashid	4,060	50.03	▲50.03
BN	Wan Mohamad Razali Wan Mahussin	4,055	49.97	▼21.21
Total valid votes		8,115	100.00	
Total rejected ballots		292		
Unreturned ballots		1		
Turnout		8,408	75.29	▲2.09
Registered electors		11,168		
Majority		5	0.06	▼42.30
PKR gain from BN		Swing		-

Pahang state election, 1995: Cini
Party	Candidate	Votes	%	∆%
BN	Wan Mohamad Razali Wan Mahussin	5,362	71.18	▼0.30
S46	Alias Sulaiman	2,171	28.82	▲0.30
Total valid votes		7,533	100.00	
Total rejected ballots		224		
Unreturned ballots		86		
Turnout		7,843	73.20	▼0.78
Registered electors		10,715		
Majority		3,191	42.36	▼0.60
BN hold		Swing		

Pahang state election, 1990: Cini
Party	Candidate	Votes	%	∆%
BN	Wan Mohamad Razali Wan Mahussin	5,897	71.48	▲2.05
S46	Ab Aziz Mohd Nor	2,353	28.52	▲28.52
Total valid votes		8,250	100.00	
Total rejected ballots		412		
Unreturned ballots		6		
Turnout		8,668	73.98	▲5.67
Registered electors		11,717		
Majority		3,544	42.96	▲4.09
BN hold		Swing		

Pahang state election, 1986: Cini
Party	Candidate	Votes	%	∆%
BN	Wan Mohamad Razali Wan Mahussin	4,159	69.43	▲0.91
PAS	Ab Rahim Aw Bakar	1,831	30.57	▼0.91
Total valid votes		5,990	100.00	
Total rejected ballots		254		
Unreturned ballots		0		
Turnout		6,244	68.31	▼2.43
Registered electors		9,141		
Majority		2,328	38.86	▲1.82
BN hold		Swing		

Pahang state election, 1982
Party	Candidate	Votes	%	∆%
BN	Wan Mohamad Razali Wan Mahussin	3,056	68.52	▼4.65
PAS	Ab Rahim Aw Bakar	1,404	31.48	▲4.65
Total valid votes		4,460	100.00	
Total rejected ballots		143		
Unreturned ballots		0		
Turnout		4,603	70.74	▼0.98
Registered electors		6,507		
Majority		1,652	37.04	▼9.30
BN hold		Swing		

Pahang state election, 1978
Party	Candidate	Votes	%	∆%
BN	Mohamed Abdul Ghani	2,539	73.17	▲9.44
PAS	Tengku Ali Shahdan Tengku Endut	931	26.83	▲26.83
Total valid votes		3,470	100.00	
Total rejected ballots		228		
Unreturned ballots		0		
Turnout		3,698	71.72	▼2.40
Registered electors		5,156		
Majority		1,608	46.34	▲18.88
BN hold		Swing		

Pahang state election, 1974
Party	Candidate	Votes	%
BN	Mohamed Abdul Ghani	2,031	63.73
Independent	Raja Puji Tengku Abdul Hamid	1,156	36.27
Total valid votes		3,187	100.00
Total rejected ballots		41	
Unreturned ballots		0	
Turnout		3,228	74.12
Registered electors		4,355	
Majority		875	27.46
This was a new constituency created.
