= Galeh Bardar =

Galeh Bardar (Persian: گله بردر) may refer to:

- Galeh Bardar, Khuzestan
- Galeh Bardar, Lorestan
