= Eshgaft-e Tavileh =

Eshgaft-e Tavileh اشگفت طويله
- Village
- Location within Iran
- Coordinates: 32°29′32″N 49°09′03″E
- Country: Iran
- Province: Khuzestan
- County: Lali
- Bakhsh: Hati
- Rural District: Jastun Shah

Population (2006)
  - Total: 23
- Time zone: UTC+3:30 (IRST)
  - Summer (DST): UTC+4:30 (IRDT)

Eshgaft-e Tavileh (Persian: اشگفت طويله, also Romanized as Eshgaft-e Ţavīleh; also known as Eshkaft and Eshkaft-e Ţavīleh) is a village in Jastun Shah Rural District, Hati District, Lali County, Khuzestan Province, Iran. At the 2006 census, its population was 23, in 6 families.
