= Golzari =

Golzari (Persian: گلزاري) may refer to:

- Golzari, Iran, a village in Khuzestan Province, Iran
- Sam Golzari (b. 1979), British actor
- Nasser Golzari, architect and academic
