= Chiti, Iran =

Chiti, Iran may refer to:

- Chiti, Fars or Jiti, a village in Khesht Rural District, Khesht District, Kazerun County
- Chiti, Khuzestan or Qal‘eh Chītī, a village in Sadat Rural District, Central District, Lali County
- Chiti, Lorestan, a village in Zalaqi-ye Gharbi Rural District, Besharat District, Aligudarz County
