= Monari =

- Michela Monari, Italian female volleyball player
- Pellegrino Monari, Italian painter
- 10722 Monari, a minor planet
- Harkaleh-ye Monari, village in Sadat Rural District, in the Central District of Lali County, Khuzestan Province, Iran
- Monari Wakita, past member of girl group Especia
