= Chuza =

This page disambiguates the Persian name transliterated with the following spellings,

Chuza, Chuzah, Choozeh, Chowzeh or Chuzeh (Persian: چوزه)

the Japanese name transliterated with the following spelling variants,

Chūza, Chuza, Chûza, or Chuuza (中座)

and the word Chuza in any language utilizing the Latin alphabet

Thus, Chuza may refer to:

== Places ==
- Chuzah, Khuzestan, a village in Iran
- Chuzah, Qazvin, another village in Iran
- Chuza reservoir, a man-made body of water held within the Chingaza Dam in Cundinamarca Department, Colombia

== People ==
- Makoto Chūza (中座 真; born 1970), Japanese retired professional shogi player

== See also ==
- Joanna, wife of Chuza, the New Testament person
