= Gandomriz =

Gandomriz or Gandom Riz or Gandum Riz (Persian: گندم ريز) may refer to:

- Gandomriz, Bushehr
- Gandomriz, Lali, Khuzestan Province
