= Kataf =

Kataf may refer to:

- the name of the Atyap people in the Hausa language
- Kataf, Iran, a village
