= Harkaleh-ye Monari =

Harkaleh-ye Monari هاركله مناري
- Village
- Location within Iran
- Coordinates: 32°20′43″N 49°17′26″E
- Country: Iran
- Province: Khuzestan
- County: Lali
- Bakhsh: Central
- Rural District: Sadat

Population (2006)
  - Total: 102
- Time zone: UTC+3:30 (IRST)
  - Summer (DST): UTC+4:30 (IRDT)

Harkaleh-ye Monari (Persian: هاركله مناري, also Romanized as Hārkaleh-ye Monārī; also known as Monārīābād) is a village in Sadat Rural District, in the Central District of Lali County, Khuzestan Province, Iran. At the 2006 census, its population was 102, in 13 families.
