= Eshgaft-e Baraftab =

Eshgaft-e Baraftab اشگفت برافتاب
- Village
- Location within Iran
- Coordinates: 32°24′00″N 49°06′00″E
- Country: Iran
- Province: Khuzestan
- County: Lali
- Bakhsh: Hati
- Rural District: Jastun Shah

Population (2006)
  - Total: 146
- Time zone: UTC+3:30 (IRST)
  - Summer (DST): UTC+4:30 (IRDT)

Eshgaft-e Baraftab (Persian: اشگفت برافتاب, also Romanized as Eshgaft-e Barāftāb; also known as Eshkaft-e Barāftāb) is a village in Jastun Shah Rural District, Hati District, Lali County, Khuzestan Province, Iran. At the 2006 census, its population was 146, in 25 families.
