= Mohd Sharim Md Zain =

Malaysian politician

Yang Berhormat Dato' Mohd Sharim Md Zain DIMP MLA
- محمد شريم محمد زين

Member of the Pahang State Legislative Assembly for Chini
- Incumbent
- Assumed office 4 July 2020
- Preceded by: Abu Bakar Harun (BN–UMNO)
- Majority: 12,650 (2020); 2,125 (2022)

Personal details
- Born: 13 March 1979 (age 47) Felda Chini 3, Pekan, Pahang, Malaysia
- Citizenship: Malaysian
- Party: United Malays National Organisation (UMNO)
- Other political affiliations: Barisan Nasional (BN)
- Spouse: Norhiliyana Abd Hamid
- Children: 5
- Occupation: Politician

Mohd Sharim bin Md Zain (born 13 March 1979) is a Malaysian politician and currently serves as member of State Assembly for Chini.

== Political career ==
He joined UMNO and served as officer to his predecessor, Abu Bakar Harun who was Chini assemblyman.

He currently holds position as Committee Member of UMNO Pekan as well as Youth Chief of UMNO FELDA Chini 3 Branch.

=== 2020 Chini by-election ===
In July 2020, Mohd Sharim first contested to become a Member of the Legislative Assembly (MLA) in Chini by-election. The election was held following the death of the incumbent Member of the Legislative Assembly (MLA) from United Malays National Organisation (UMNO), Abu Bakar Harun on 7 May who had held the seat since 2004.

On 18 June, Barisan Nasional decided to nominate Mohd Sharim, who is a FELDA resident as its candidate for the by-election.

He won the by-election after defeating two other Independent candidates, Tengku Zainul Hisham Tengku Hussin (former Deputy Division Chief of BERSATU Pekan) and Mohd Shukri Mohd Ramli (Social Activist), by 12,650 majority.

== Election results ==
Pahang State Legislative Assembly
Year	Constituency	Candidate	Votes	Pct	Opponent(s)	Votes	Pct	Ballots cast	Majority	Turnout
2020	N23 Chini	Mohd Sharim Md Zain (UMNO)	13,872	91.08%	Tengku Zainul Hisham Tengku Hussin (IND)	1,222	8.02%	15,506	12,650	73.87%
2020	N23 Chini	Mohd Sharim Md Zain (UMNO)	13,872	91.08%	Mohd Shukri Mohd Ramli (IND)	137	0.90%	15,506	12,650	73.87%
2022	N23 Chini	Mohd Sharim Md Zain (UMNO)	10,588	53.25%	Fahrur Rozi Jalaluddin (PAS)	8,463	42.56%	20,244	2,125	76.12%
2022	N23 Chini	Mohd Sharim Md Zain (UMNO)	10,588	53.25%	Mohamad Yazid Che Mat (PKR)	833	4.19%	20,244	2,125	76.12%

== Honours ==
- Pahang
  - Knight Companion of the Order of the Crown of Pahang (DIMP) – Dato' (2024)
