= Taraz, Khuzestan =

City in Khuzestan province, Iran

Taraz Persian: تاراز
- City
- Location within Iran
- Coordinates: 32°25′00″N 49°08′30″E
- Country: Iran
- Province: Khuzestan
- County: Lali
- District: Hati
- Established as a municipality: 2022

Population (2016)
  - Total: 511
- Time zone: UTC+3:30 (IRST)

Taraz (Persian: تراز) (Note: Also romanized as Tārāz; also known as Tārāz-e Hayāt Qolī) is a city in, and the capital of, Hati District of Lali County, Khuzestan province, Iran.

== Demographics ==
=== Population ===
At the time of the 2006 National Census, Taraz's population was 424 in 77 households, when it was a village in Jastun Shah Rural District. The following census in 2011 counted 545 people in 112 households. The 2016 census measured the population of the village as 511 people in 126 households. It was the most populous village in its rural district.

In 2022, the village of Taraz was elevated to the status of a city.
