= Lali, Iran =

City in Khuzestan province, Iran

Lali Persian: لالی
- City
- Location within Iran
- Coordinates: 32°19′46″N 49°05′30″E
- Country: Iran
- Province: Khuzestan
- County: Lali
- District: Central

Population (2016)
  - Total: 18,473
- Time zone: UTC+3:30 (IRST)

Lali (Persian: لالی) (Note: Also romanized as Lālī; also known as Dasht-e Lālī and Lālī Pelāyen) is a city in the Central District of Lali County, Khuzestan province, Iran, serving as capital of both the county and district.

== Demographics ==
=== Population ===
At the time of the 2006 National Census, the city's population was 16,213 in 3,041 households. The following census in 2011 counted 17,745 people in 4,106 households. The 2016 census measured the population of the city as 18,473 people in 4,823 households.

== Climate ==
Typically of the Khuzestan Plain, Lali has a hot semi-arid climate (Köppen BSh) characterised by brutally hot, rainless summers and comfortable winters with usually cold nights and occasional periods of heavy rainfall.

Climate data for Lali
Month	Jan	Feb	Mar	Apr	May	Jun	Jul	Aug	Sep	Oct	Nov	Dec	Year
Mean daily maximum °C (°F)	16.7 (62.1)	18.1 (64.6)	23.3 (73.9)	29.9 (85.8)	36.8 (98.2)	42.7 (108.9)	45.5 (113.9)	44.6 (112.3)	42.3 (108.1)	35.8 (96.4)	26.4 (79.5)	19.3 (66.7)	31.8 (89.2)
Mean daily minimum °C (°F)	5.1 (41.2)	6.0 (42.8)	10.5 (50.9)	15.8 (60.4)	20.3 (68.5)	23.6 (74.5)	27.1 (80.8)	25.9 (78.6)	22.8 (73.0)	18.3 (64.9)	12.9 (55.2)	7.2 (45.0)	16.3 (61.3)
Average rainfall mm (inches)	95 (3.7)	72 (2.8)	62 (2.4)	46 (1.8)	12 (0.5)	0 (0)	0 (0)	0 (0)	0 (0)	3 (0.1)	52 (2.0)	82 (3.2)	424 (16.5)
Source: Climate-data.org
