= 2020 Chini by-election =

State by-election in Pahang, Malaysia

- 4 July 2020

N23 Chini seat in the Pahang State Legislative Assembly
	Majority party	Minority party	Third party
	BN	IND	IND
Candidate	Mohd Sharim Md Zain	Tengku Zainul Hisham Tengku Hussin	Mohd Shukri Mohd Ramli
Party	UMNO	Independent	Independent
Alliance	BN-MN-PN	Bersatu Blackout-PH
Popular vote	13,872	1,222	137
Percentage	91.08%	8.02%	0.90%
MLA before election
Abu Bakar Harun (died)
Barisan Nasional (UMNO)
Elected MLA
Mohd Sharim Md Zain
Barisan Nasional (UMNO)

The N23 Chini state constituency boundaries within the P85 Pekan parliamentary constituency in Pahang.

A by-election was held on 4 July 2020 for the seat of Chini in the Pahang State Legislative Assembly. The seat became vacant following the death of the incumbent Member of the Legislative Assembly (MLA) from United Malays National Organisation (UMNO) of Barisan Nasional (BN) coalition, Abu Bakar Harun on 7 May 2020 who had held the seat since 2004. Mohd Sharim Md Zain from BN won the by-election with a 12,650 majority to retain the seat again.

The Election Commission (EC) had set the nomination day on 20 June 2020, early voting on 30 June and polling day for 4 July with a 14-day campaign period.

Chini, one of the four state constituencies within the Pekan federal constituency which is currently held by BN's adviser and former Prime Minister Najib Razak, is a majority Malay seat with 91% Malays. There are 20,990 registered voters for the Chini by-election comprising 20,972 ordinary voters and 18 early voters. The voters comprise 10,269 men and 10,721 women. This will be the first election in the country following the 2020 political crisis and COVID-19 pandemic. The by-election to be conducted under the special standard operating procedure (SOP) imposed by EC due to the New Normal as the country is still observing the recovery phase of Movement Control Order (MCO) for COVID-19.

== Nominations ==
Secretary-General of UMNO and BN, Annuar Musa confirmed that BN will place its candidate in the by-election and continue to work with Pan-Malaysian Islamic Party (PAS) on the concept of Muafakat Nasional (MN) as in the previous by-elections. UMNO also confirmed it will represent BN to defend the seat. Najib Razak's eldest son, Mohd Nizar Najib who is the Pekan UMNO Youth chief has been coined as a potential party candidate of the by-election. On 18 June, Barisan Nasional decided to nominate Mohd Sharim Md Zain, a FELDA resident as its candidate for the by-election.

Malaysian United Indigenous Party (BERSATU) had also declared its full support to the chosen BN candidate who will be representing the new Perikatan Nasional (PN) government. Pekan BERSATU deputy chief, Tengku Zainul Hisham Tengku Hussin, however announced his candidacy for the by-election as an independent candidate on 18 June.

People's Justice Party (PKR) Secretary-general, Saifuddin Nasution Ismail announced that Pakatan Harapan (PH) will not contest the by-election. Saifuddin cited that the COVID-19 pandemic may affect the safety of voters, therefore abandoning the race. Conceding the coalition's presidential council decision, PH might back independent candidate instead at the polls in order to fight against UMNO and BN.

On Nomination Day, the BN candidate Mohd Sharim, alongside two independents; later-got-sacked BERSATU's Tengku Zainul (house logo) and social activist Mohd Shukri Mohd Ramli (key logo), filed their nomination papers for a three-way race for the state assembly seat.

== Results ==
Pahang state by-election, 2020: Chini Upon the death of the incumbent, Abu Bakar Bin Harun
Party	Candidate	Votes	%	∆%
BN	Mohd Sharim Md Zain	13,872	91.08	-2.46
Independent	Tengku Zainul Hisham Tengku Hussin	1,222	8.02	+1.56
Independent	Mohd Shukri Mohd Ramli	137	0.90	N/A
Total valid votes		15,231	100.00	
Total rejected ballots		239		
Unreturned ballots		36		
Turnout		15,506	73.87	
Registered electors		20,990		
Majority		12,650		
BN hold		Swing		-2.01
Source(s): 1. "His Majesty's Government Gazette - Notice of Contested Election, By-election of State Legislative Assembly of N.23 Chini for the State of Pahang [P.U. (B) 287/2020]" (PDF). Attorney General's Chambers of Malaysia. 22 June 2020.; 2. "Federal Government Gazette - Results of Contested Election and Statements of the Poll after the Official Addition of Votes for the By-election of N.23 Chini [P.U. (B) 320/2020]" (PDF). Attorney General's Chambers of Malaysia. 6 July 2020.

=== Results based on polling district ===
BN won all polling districts and post and early votes.

Polling District	Polling District Code	Polling Station	Polling Station No.	Voters (2016)
Terpai	085/23/01	SK Kinchir	2	428
Salong	085/23/02	Dewan Mempelas Kampung Baru PPSK Salong Mukim Penyor 1	2	296
Mambang	085/23/03	SK Mambang	3	708
Paloh Hinai	085/23/04	SMK Paloh Hinai	4	807
Kampung Dusun	085/23/05	Balai Raya & Perpustakaan Desa Kampung Dusun	3	480
FELDA Chini Timur 3 & 4	085/23/06	SK LKTP Chini Timur 2	3	649
FELDA Chini Timur 1	085/23/07	SK LKTP Chini Timur 1	7	1,661
FELDA Chini Timur 2	085/23/08	SMK Chini Timur	6	1,399
FELDA Chini 5	085/23/09	SK LKTP Chini 3 & 5	6	1,467
FELDA Chini 4	085/23/10	SK LKTP Chini 1 & 4	7	1,685
FELDA Chini 1	085/23/11	1. Sekolah Agama Rakyat (KAFA) Nur Ilham FELDA Chini 1; 2. Dewan Semai Bakti Kampung FELDA Chini 1	7	1,746
FELDA Chini 2	085/23/12	SMK Chini 2	8	1,977
FELDA Chini 3	085/23/13	1. KAFA Kelas Al-Quran Dan Fardu Ain FELDA Chini 03; 2. Dewan Semai Bakti Kampung FELDA Chini 3	7	2,030
Undi Awal	058/23/00	Balai Polis Chini Bilik Maklumat	2	17

== Previous results ==
Pahang state election, 2018: Chini
Party	Candidate	Votes	%	∆%
BN	Abu Bakar Harun	10,027	60.78	-11.85
PAS	Mohd. Fadhil Noor Abdul Karim	5,405	32.76	+4.78
PH	Mohd. Razali Ithnain	1,065	6.46	+6.46
Total valid votes		16,497	100.00	
Total rejected ballots		232		
Unreturned ballots		69		
Turnout		16,798	79.05	
Registered electors		21,251		
Majority		4,622	28.02	
BN hold		Swing		
Source(s) "His Majesty's Government Gazette - Notice of Contested Election, State Legislative Assembly for the State of Pahang [P.U. (B) 254/2018]" (PDF). Attorney General's Chambers of Malaysia. 3 May 2018. "Federal Government Gazette - Results of Contested Election and Statements of the Poll after the Official Addition of Votes, State Constituencies for the State of Pahang [P.U. (B) 328/2018]" (PDF). Attorney General's Chambers of Malaysia. 28 May 2018.
