= Eshkaft-e Siah, Hormozgan =

Coordinates: 27.1480°N 54.8344°E

Eshkaft-e Siah اشكفت سياه
- Village
- Interactive map of Eshkaft-e Siah
- Country: Iran
- Province: Hormozgan
- County: Bastak
- Bakhsh: Jenah
- Rural District: Jenah

Population (2006)
  - Total: 36
- Time zone: UTC+3:30 (IRST)
  - Summer (DST): UTC+4:30 (IRDT)

Eshkaft-e Siah (Persian: اشكفت سياه, also Romanized as Eshkaft-e Sīāh) is a village in Jenah Rural District, Jenah District, Bastak County, Hormozgan Province, Iran. At the 2006 census, its population was 36, in 8 families.
