= Sheykhi, Fars =

Sheykhi شيخي
- Village
- Location within Iran
- Coordinates: 29°45′18″N 51°35′23″E
- Country: Iran
- Province: Fars
- County: Kazerun
- Bakhsh: Central
- Rural District: Shapur

Population (2006)
  - Total: 323
- Time zone: UTC+3:30 (IRST)
  - Summer (DST): UTC+4:30 (IRDT)

Sheykhi (Persian: شيخي, also Romanized as Sheykhī) is a village in Shapur Rural District, in the Central District of Kazerun County, Fars province, Iran. At the 2006 census, its population was 323, in 75 families.
