= Darreh Eshkaft-e Sarak =

Darreh Eshkaft-e Sarak دره اشكفت سراك
- Village
- Location within Iran
- Coordinates: 31°55′30″N 49°51′47″E
- Country: Iran
- Province: Khuzestan
- County: Izeh
- Bakhsh: Central
- Rural District: Howmeh-ye Sharqi

Population (2006)
  - Total: 109
- Time zone: UTC+3:30 (IRST)
  - Summer (DST): UTC+4:30 (IRDT)

Darreh Eshkaft-e Sarak (Persian: دره اشكفت سراك, also Romanized as Darreh Eshkaft-e Sarāk; also known as Darreh Eshkaft) is a village in Howmeh-ye Sharqi Rural District, in the Central District of Izeh County, Khuzestan Province, Iran. At the 2006 census, its population was 109, in 18 families.
