= Chal Bardar, Izeh =

Chal Bardar چال بردر
- Village
- Location within Iran
- Coordinates: 32°02′04″N 49°45′23″E
- Country: Iran
- Province: Khuzestan
- County: Izeh
- Bakhsh: Central
- Rural District: Pian

Population (2006 August)
  - Total: 163
- Time zone: UTC+3:30 (IRST)
  - Summer (DST): UTC+4:30 (IRDT)

Chal Bardar (Persian: چال بردر, also Romanized as Chāl Bardār and Chāl Bar Dar) is a village in Pian Rural District, in the Central District of Izeh County, Khuzestan Province, Iran. At the 2006 census, its population was 163, in 27 families.
