= Jan Ali, Kermanshah =

Jan Ali جانعلي
- Village
- Location within Iran
- Coordinates: 35°00′07″N 47°21′02″E
- Country: Iran
- Province: Kermanshah
- County: Sonqor
- Bakhsh: Kolyai
- Rural District: Agahan

Population (2006)
  - Total: 93
- Time zone: UTC+3:30 (IRST)
  - Summer (DST): UTC+4:30 (IRDT)

Jan Ali (Persian: جانعلي, also Romanized as Jān ‘Alī and Jān‘alī) is a village in Agahan Rural District, Kolyai District, Sonqor County, Kermanshah Province, Iran. At the 2006 census, its population was 93, in 18 families.
