= Dar Eshgaft-e Baba Bahram =

Dar Eshgaft-e Baba Bahram دراشگفت بابابهرام
- Village
- Location within Iran
- Coordinates: 33°14′28″N 47°53′12″E
- Country: Iran
- Province: Lorestan
- County: Pol-e Dokhtar
- Bakhsh: Central
- Rural District: Malavi

Population (2006)
  - Total: 50
- Time zone: UTC+3:30 (IRST)
  - Summer (DST): UTC+4:30 (IRDT)

Dar Eshgaft-e Baba Bahram (Persian: دراشگفت بابابهرام, also Romanized as Dar Eshgaft-e Bābā Bahrām) is a village in Malavi Rural District, in the Central District of Pol-e Dokhtar County, Lorestan Province, Iran. At the 2006 census, its population was 50, in 12 families.
