= Darreh Barik, Izeh =

Darreh Barik دره باريك
- Village
- Location within Iran
- Coordinates: 31°39′49″N 49°47′31″E
- Country: Iran
- Province: Khuzestan
- County: Izeh
- Bakhsh: Central
- Rural District: Margha

Population (2006)
  - Total: 87
- Time zone: UTC+3:30 (IRST)
  - Summer (DST): UTC+4:30 (IRDT)

Darreh Barik (Persian: دره باريك, also Romanized as Darreh Bārīk; also known as Darrehbārīk) is a village in Margha Rural District, in the Central District of Izeh County, Khuzestan Province, Iran. At the 2006 census, its population was 87, in 13 families.
