= Menazel Sazmani, Bagh-e Malek =

Menazel Sazmani منازل سازماني
- Village
- Country: Iran
- Province: Khuzestan
- County: Bagh-e Malek
- Bakhsh: Central
- Rural District: Qaleh Tall

Population (2006)
  - Total: 83
- Time zone: UTC+3:30 (IRST)
  - Summer (DST): UTC+4:30 (IRDT)

Menazel Sazmani (Persian: منازل سازماني, also Romanized as Menāzal Sāzmānī) is a village in Qaleh Tall Rural District, in the Central District of Bagh-e Malek County, Khuzestan Province, Iran. At the 2006 census, its population was 83, in 21 families.
