= Darreh-ye Eshgaft, Chaharmahal and Bakhtiari =

Darreh-ye Eshgaft دره اشگفت
- Village
- Location within Iran
- Coordinates: 31°31′40″N 50°21′56″E
- Country: Iran
- Province: Chaharmahal and Bakhtiari
- County: Lordegan
- Bakhsh: Manj
- Rural District: Barez

Population (2006)
  - Total: 163
- Time zone: UTC+3:30 (IRST)
  - Summer (DST): UTC+4:30 (IRDT)

Darreh-ye Eshgaft (Persian: دره اشگفت) is a village in Barez Rural District, Manj District, Lordegan County, Chaharmahal and Bakhtiari Province, Iran. At the 2006 census, its population was 163, in 30 families. The village is populated by Lurs.
