= Darreh Barik, Ilam =

Darreh Barik دره باريك
- Village
- Location within Iran
- Coordinates: 33°45′10″N 46°57′24″E
- Country: Iran
- Province: Ilam
- County: Chardavol
- Bakhsh: Helilan
- Rural District: Helilan

Population (2006)
  - Total: 203
- Time zone: UTC+3:30 (IRST)
  - Summer (DST): UTC+4:30 (IRDT)

Darreh Barik (Persian: دره باريك, also Romanized as Darreh Barīk) is a village in Helilan Rural District, Helilan District, Chardavol County, Ilam Province, Iran. At the 2006 census, its population was 203, in 37 families. The village is populated by Kurds.
