= Khvajehabad, Kerman =

Khvajehabad خواجه اباد
- Village
- Location within Iran
- Coordinates: 28°56′00″N 58°41′00″E
- Country: Iran
- Province: Kerman
- County: Narmashir
- Bakhsh: Central
- Rural District: Azizabad

Population (2006)
  - Total: 336
- Time zone: UTC+3:30 (IRST)
  - Summer (DST): UTC+4:30 (IRDT)

Khvajehabad (Persian: خواجه اباد, also Romanized as Khvājehābād) is a village in Azizabad Rural District, in the Central District of Narmashir County, Kerman Province, Iran. At the 2006 census, its population was 336, in 76 families.
