= Titevand =

Titevand تي توند
- Village
- Location within Iran
- Coordinates: 30°32′39″N 51°13′31″E
- Country: Iran
- Province: Fars
- County: Rostam
- Bakhsh: Sorna
- Rural District: Poshtkuh-e Rostam

Population (2006)
  - Total: 23
- Time zone: UTC+3:30 (IRST)
  - Summer (DST): UTC+4:30 (IRDT)

Titevand (Persian: تي توند, also Romanized as Tītevand; also known as Eshkaft-e Tīneh Vand and Tīneh Vand) is a village in Poshtkuh-e Rostam Rural District, Sorna District, Rostam County, Fars province, Iran. At the 2006 census, its population was 23, in 4 families.
