= Eshgaft-e Mamadali Khan =

Eshgaft-e Mamadali Khan اشگفت ممدلي خان
- Village
- Country: Iran
- Province: Khuzestan
- County: Dezful
- Bakhsh: Sardasht
- Rural District: Sardasht

Population (2006)
  - Total: 31
- Time zone: UTC+3:30 (IRST)
  - Summer (DST): UTC+4:30 (IRDT)

Eshgaft-e Mamadali Khan (Persian: اشگفت ممدلي خان, also Romanized as Eshgaft-e Mamadalī Khān) is a village in Sardasht Rural District, Sardasht District, Dezful County, Khuzestan Province, Iran. At the 2006 census, its population was 31, in 7 families.
