= Shir Ali Khan, Iran =

Shir Ali Khan شيرعلي خان
- Village
- Location within Iran
- Coordinates: 31°01′59″N 61°45′42″E
- Country: Iran
- Province: Sistan and Baluchestan
- County: Hirmand
- Bakhsh: Central
- Rural District: Jahanabad

Population (2006)
  - Total: 61
- Time zone: UTC+3:30 (IRST)
  - Summer (DST): UTC+4:30 (IRDT)

Shir Ali Khan (Persian: شيرعلي خان, also Romanized as Shīr ‘Alī Khān; also known as Shīr ‘Alī) is a village in Jahanabad Rural District, in the Central District of Hirmand County, Sistan and Baluchestan Province, Iran. At the 2006 census, its population was 61, in 16 families.
