= Eshkaft-e Siahoo =

Cave and archaeological site in Iran

Eshkaft-e Siahoo cave
- Eshkaft-e Siahoo
- location in Iran
- 30°11′15″N 52°4′2″E
- Periods: Neolithic
- Location: Marvdasht Plain
- Region: Fars province, Iran

Site notes
- Excavation dates: 2006
- Archaeologists: Mohammad Feizkhah

Eshkaft-e Siahoo (Persian: اشکفت سیاهو), meaning "Black Cave" in the regional dialect, was used by Neolithic humans as a rock shelter between 12,000 and 10,000-years ago. It is located near Rahmat Mountain on the Marvdasht Plain in the Fars province, Iran. The cave was discovered in June 2006 and archaeological excavations were subsequently undertaken, led by Iranian archeologist Mohammad Feizkhah.
