= Cheshmeh-ye Shir Ali =

Cheshmeh-ye Shir Ali چشمه شيرعلي
- Village
- Country: Iran
- Province: Ilam
- County: Ilam
- Bakhsh: Chavar
- Rural District: Arkavazi

Population (2006)
  - Total: 40
- Time zone: UTC+3:30 (IRST)
  - Summer (DST): UTC+4:30 (IRDT)

Cheshmeh-ye Shir Ali (Persian: چشمه شيرعلي, also Romanized as Cheshmeh-ye Shīr ʿAlī) is a village in Arkavazi Rural District, Chavar District, Ilam County, Ilam Province, Iran. At the 2006 census, its population was 40, in 7 families. The village is populated by Kurds.
