= Seh Eshgaftan Sabzi =

Seh Eshgaftan Sabzi سه اشگفتان سبزي
- Village
- Location within Iran
- Coordinates: 32°32′00″N 48°49′00″E
- Country: Iran
- Province: Khuzestan
- County: Dezful
- Bakhsh: Sardasht
- Rural District: Sardasht

Population (2006)
  - Total: 23
- Time zone: UTC+3:30 (IRST)
  - Summer (DST): UTC+4:30 (IRDT)

Seh Eshgaftan Sabzi (Persian: سه اشگفتان سبزي, also romanized as Seh Eshgaftān Sabzī; also known as Sarash Gaft, Sar Eshgaft, Seh Eshgaftān, and Seh Eshkaftan) is a village in Sardasht Rural District, Sardasht District, Dezful County, Khuzestan Province, Iran. At the 2006 census, its population was 23, in 4 families.
