= Sheykhi Zirdu =

Sheykhi Zirdu شيخي زيردو
- Village
- Location within Iran
- Coordinates: 30°14′23″N 51°26′33″E
- Country: Iran
- Province: Fars
- County: Rostam
- Bakhsh: Central
- Rural District: Rostam-e Yek

Population (2006)
  - Total: 249
- Time zone: UTC+3:30 (IRST)
  - Summer (DST): UTC+4:30 (IRDT)

Sheykhi Zirdu (Persian: شيخي زيردو, also Romanized as Sheykhī Zīrdū and Sheykhī Zīr Do; also known as Karia-yi-Shaikhi, Karīyeh-ye Sheykhī, and Sheykhī) is a Zirdu village in Rostam-e Yek Rural District, in the Central District of Rostam County, Fars province, Iran. At the 2006 census, its population was 249, in 48 families.
