= Sar Eshgaft-e Daraki =

Sar Eshgaft-e Daraki سراشگفت درکی
- Village
- Location within Iran
- Coordinates: 32°47′27″N 48°19′50″E
- Country: Iran
- Province: Khuzestan
- County: Andimeshk
- Bakhsh: Alvar-e Garmsiri
- Rural District: Qilab

Population (2006)
  - Total: 62
- Time zone: UTC+3:30 (IRST)
  - Summer (DST): UTC+4:30 (IRDT)

Sar Eshgaft-e Daraki (Persian: سراشگفت درکی, also Romanized as Sar Eshgaft-e Darakī and Sar Eshkaft-e Darakī; also known as Sar Eshkaft and Sar Eshkaftī) is a village in Qilab Rural District, Alvar-e Garmsiri District, Andimeshk County, Khuzestan Province, Iran. At the 2006 census, its population was 62, in 11 families.
