= Eshkaft-e Olya Gelal =

Village in Kohgiluyeh and Boyer-Ahmad, Iran

Eshkaft-e Olya Gelal اشكفت علياگلال
- Village
- Location within Iran
- Coordinates: 30°53′43″N 50°36′06″E
- Country: Iran
- Province: Kohgiluyeh and Boyer-Ahmad
- County: Boyer-Ahmad
- Bakhsh: Ludab
- Rural District: Chin

Population (2006)
  - Total: 19
- Time zone: UTC+3:30 (IRST)
  - Summer (DST): UTC+4:30 (IRDT)

Eshkaft-e Olya Gelal (Persian: اشكفت علياگلال, also Romanized as Eshkaft-e ‘Olyā Gelāl; also known as Eshkaft) is a village in Chin Rural District, Ludab District, Boyer-Ahmad County, Kohgiluyeh and Boyer-Ahmad Province, Iran. At the 2006 census, its population was 19, in 4 families.
