= Eshkaft Shah-e Sofla =

Eshkaft Shah-e Sofla اشكفت شاه سفلي
- Village
- Location within Iran
- Coordinates: 30°33′51″N 51°04′40″E
- Country: Iran
- Province: Kohgiluyeh and Boyer-Ahmad
- County: Basht
- Bakhsh: Central
- Rural District: Kuh Mareh Khami

Population (2006)
  - Total: 61
- Time zone: UTC+3:30 (IRST)
  - Summer (DST): UTC+4:30 (IRDT)

Eshkaft Shah-e Sofla (Persian: اشكفت شاه سفلي, also Romanized as Eshkaft Shāh-e Soflá; also known as Eshkaft Shāh-e Pā’īn) is a village in Kuh Mareh Khami Rural District, in the Central District of Basht County, Kohgiluyeh and Boyer-Ahmad Province, Iran. At the 2006 census, its population was 61, in 16 families.
