= Eshkaft, Fars =

Eshkaft اشكفت
- Village
- Location within Iran
- Coordinates: 30°10′57″N 52°03′38″E
- Country: Iran
- Province: Fars
- County: Sepidan
- Bakhsh: Hamaijan
- Rural District: Hamaijan

Population (2006)
  - Total: 133
- Time zone: UTC+3:30 (IRST)
  - Summer (DST): UTC+4:30 (IRDT)

Eshkaft (Persian: اشكفت; also known as Dūzāb, Shādāb, Shegoft Shādāb, and Shohadā) is a village in Hamaijan Rural District, Hamaijan District, Sepidan County, Fars province, Iran. At the 2006 census, its population was 133, in 26 families.
