= Eshgaft-e Kahdun =

Eshgaft-e Kahdun اشگفت كاهدون
- Village
- Country: Iran
- Province: Khuzestan
- County: Dezful
- Bakhsh: Sardasht
- Rural District: Seyyedvaliyeddin

Population (2006)
  - Total: 27
- Time zone: UTC+3:30 (IRST)
  - Summer (DST): UTC+4:30 (IRDT)

Eshgaft-e Kahdun (Persian: اشگفت كاهدون, also Romanized as Eshgaft-e Kāhdūn) is a village in Seyyedvaliyeddin Rural District, Sardasht District, Dezful County, Khuzestan Province, Iran. At the 2006 census, its population was 27, in 4 families.
