= Ab Jaz, Izeh =

Ab Jaz ابجاز
- Village
- Location within Iran
- Coordinates: 31°52′50″N 49°45′00″E
- Country: Iran
- Province: Khuzestan
- County: Izeh
- Bakhsh: Central
- Rural District: Pian

Population (2006)
  - Total: 29
- Time zone: UTC+3:30 (IRST)
  - Summer (DST): UTC+4:30 (IRDT)

Ab Jaz (Persian: ابجاز, also Romanized as Āb Jāz; also known as Āb Jārī and Āb Jāzī) is a village in Pian Rural District, in the Central District of Izeh County, Khuzestan Province, Iran. At the 2006 census, its population was 29, in 4 families.
