= Darreh-ye Barik, Bagh-e Malek =

Darreh-ye Barik دره باريك
- Village
- Country: Iran
- Province: Khuzestan
- County: Bagh-e Malek
- Bakhsh: Central
- Rural District: Qaleh Tall

Population (2006)
  - Total: 65
- Time zone: UTC+3:30 (IRST)
  - Summer (DST): UTC+4:30 (IRDT)

Darreh-ye Barik (Persian: دره باريك, also Romanized as Darreh-ye Bārīḵ) is a village in Qaleh Tall Rural District, in the Central District of Bagh-e Malek County, Khuzestan Province, Iran. At the 2006 census, its population was 65, in 16 families.
