= Shir Ali, Behbahan =

Shir Ali شيرعلي
- Village
- Location within Iran
- Coordinates: 30°39′00″N 50°06′16″E
- Country: Iran
- Province: Khuzestan
- County: Behbahan
- Bakhsh: Central
- Rural District: Howmeh

Population (2006)
  - Total: 23
- Time zone: UTC+3:30 (IRST)
  - Summer (DST): UTC+4:30 (IRDT)

Shir Ali (Persian: شيرعلي, also Romanized as Shīr ‘Alī) is a village in Howmeh Rural District, in the Central District of Behbahan County, Khuzestan Province, Iran. At the 2006 census, its population was 23, in 5 families.
