= Eshkaft-e Shiri =

Eshkaft-e Shiri اشكفت شيري
- Village
- Location within Iran
- Coordinates: 30°31′05″N 50°24′43″E
- Country: Iran
- Province: Kohgiluyeh and Boyer-Ahmad
- County: Gachsaran
- Bakhsh: Central
- Rural District: Lishtar

Population (2006)
  - Total: 133
- Time zone: UTC+3:30 (IRST)
  - Summer (DST): UTC+4:30 (IRDT)

Eshkaft-e Shiri (Persian: اشكفت شيري, also Romanized as Eshkaft-e Shīrī; also known as Eshgaft-e Shīrī) is a village in Lishtar Rural District, in the Central District of Gachsaran County, Kohgiluyeh and Boyer-Ahmad Province, Iran. At the 2006 census, its population was 133, in 27 families.
