= Eshgaft-e Jamushi =

Eshgaft-e Jamushi اشگفت جاموشي
- Village
- Location within Iran
- Coordinates: 31°48′23″N 49°54′21″E
- Country: Iran
- Province: Khuzestan
- County: Izeh
- Bakhsh: Central
- Rural District: Howmeh-ye Sharqi

Population (2006)
  - Total: 414
- Time zone: UTC+3:30 (IRST)
  - Summer (DST): UTC+4:30 (IRDT)

Eshgaft-e Jamushi (Persian: اشگفت جاموشي, also Romanized as Eshgaft-e Jāmūshī; also known as Eshkaft-e Jāmūshī) is a village in Howmeh-ye Sharqi Rural District, in the Central District of Izeh County, Khuzestan Province, Iran. At the 2006 census, its population was 414, in 69 families.
