= Eshgaft-e Khorma =

Eshgaft-e Khorma اشگفت خرما
- Village
- Location within Iran
- Coordinates: 32°31′13″N 48°43′48″E
- Country: Iran
- Province: Khuzestan
- County: Dezful
- Bakhsh: Sardasht
- Rural District: Sardasht

Population (2006)
  - Total: 67
- Time zone: UTC+3:30 (IRST)
  - Summer (DST): UTC+4:30 (IRDT)

Eshgaft-e Khorma (Persian: اشگفت خرما, also Romanized as Eshgaft-e Khormā; also known as Eshkaft-e Khorma) is a village in Sardasht Rural District, Sardasht District, Dezful County, Khuzestan Province, Iran. At the 2006 census, its population was 67, in 10 families.
