= Eshkaft-e Qateri Murzard =

Eshkaft-e Qateri Murzard اشكفت قاطري مورزرد
- Village
- Location within Iran
- Coordinates: 31°13′46″N 50°47′57″E
- Country: Iran
- Province: Kohgiluyeh and Boyer-Ahmad
- County: Boyer-Ahmad
- Bakhsh: Margown
- Rural District: Margown

Population (2006)
  - Total: 106
- Time zone: UTC+3:30 (IRST)
  - Summer (DST): UTC+4:30 (IRDT)

Eshkaft-e Qateri Murzard (Persian: اشكفت قاطري مورزرد, also Romanized as Eshkaft-e Qāţerī Mūrzard; also known as Eshgaft-e Qāţerī) is a village in Margown Rural District, Margown District, Boyer-Ahmad County, Kohgiluyeh and Boyer-Ahmad Province, Iran. At the 2006 census, its population was 106, in 22 families.
