= Eshgaft-e Baba Mir =

Eshgaft-e Baba Mir اشگفت بابامير
- Village
- Location within Iran
- Coordinates: 31°42′30″N 49°43′39″E
- Country: Iran
- Province: Khuzestan
- County: Izeh
- Bakhsh: Central
- Rural District: Holayjan

Population (2006)
  - Total: 356
- Time zone: UTC+3:30 (IRST)
  - Summer (DST): UTC+4:30 (IRDT)

Eshgaft-e Baba Mir (Persian: اشگفت بابامير, also Romanized as Eshgaft-e Bābā Mīr; also known as Eshkaft-e Bābā Mīr) is a village in Holayjan Rural District, in the Central District of Izeh County, Khuzestan Province, Iran. At the 2006 census, its population was 356, in 60 families.
