= Eshgaft-e Gav =

Eshkaft Gah اشگفت گاه
- Village
- Location within Iran
- Coordinates: 31°49′39″N 49°56′44″E
- Country: Iran
- Province: Khuzestan
- County: Izeh
- Bakhsh: Central
- Rural District: Howmeh-ye Sharqi

Population (2006)
  - Total: 262
- Time zone: UTC+3:30 (IRST)
  - Summer (DST): UTC+4:30 (IRDT)

Eshgaft Gah (Persian: اشگفت گاه, also Romanized as Eshkaft Gāh; also known as Eshkaft Gāh and Eshkaft Gah) is a village in Howmeh-ye Sharqi Rural District, in the Central District of Izeh County, Khuzestan Province, Iran. At the 2006 census, its population was 262, in 47 families.
