= Eshgaft-e Rumeh =

Eshgaft-e Rumeh اشگفت رومه
- Village
- Location within Iran
- Coordinates: 30°14′14″N 51°43′35″E
- Country: Iran
- Province: Fars
- County: Mamasani
- Bakhsh: Central
- Rural District: Jowzar

Population (2006)
  - Total: 91
- Time zone: UTC+3:30 (IRST)
  - Summer (DST): UTC+4:30 (IRDT)

Eshgaft-e Rumeh (Persian: اشگفت رومه, also Romanized as Eshgaft-e Rūmeh; also known as Eshkaft-e Rūmeh) is a village in Jowzar Rural District, in the Central District of Mamasani County, Fars province, Iran. At the 2006 census, its population was 91, in 23 families.
