= Eshkaft Siah, Charam =

Eshkaft Siah اشكفت سياه
- Village
- Location within Iran
- Coordinates: 30°59′41″N 50°49′19″E
- Country: Iran
- Province: Kohgiluyeh and Boyer-Ahmad
- County: Charam
- Bakhsh: Sarfaryab
- Rural District: Poshteh-ye Zilayi

Population (2006)
  - Total: 52
- Time zone: UTC+3:30 (IRST)
  - Summer (DST): UTC+4:30 (IRDT)

Eshkaft Siah (Persian: اشكفت سياه, also Romanized as Eshkaft Sīāh; also known as Eshgaft-e Sīāh) is a village in Poshteh-ye Zilayi Rural District, Sarfaryab District, Charam County, Kohgiluyeh and Boyer-Ahmad Province, Iran. At the 2006 census, its population was 52, in 11 families.
