= Kataf-e Nashalil =

Kataf-e Nashalil كتف ناشليل
- Village
- Location within Iran
- Coordinates: 31°41′49″N 49°53′33″E
- Country: Iran
- Province: Khuzestan
- County: Izeh
- Bakhsh: Central
- Rural District: Holayjan

Population (2006)
  - Total: 33
- Time zone: UTC+3:30 (IRST)
  - Summer (DST): UTC+4:30 (IRDT)

Kataf-e Nashalil (Persian: كتف ناشليل, also Romanized as Kataf-e Nāshalīl; also known as Keft-e Nāshalīl) is a village in Holayjan Rural District, in the Central District of Izeh County, Khuzestan Province, Iran. At the 2006 census, its population was 33, in 5 families.
