= Dareshgeft, Papi =

Dareshgeft دراشگفت
- Village
- Location within Iran
- Coordinates: 33°13′24″N 48°48′42″E
- Country: Iran
- Province: Lorestan
- County: Khorramabad
- Bakhsh: Papi
- Rural District: Sepiddasht

Population (2006)
  - Total: 162
- Time zone: UTC+3:30 (IRST)
  - Summer (DST): UTC+4:30 (IRDT)

Dareshgeft (Persian: دراشگفت, also Romanized as Darreh Eshgaft and Darreh-ye Eshkaft) is a village in Sepiddasht Rural District, Papi District, Khorramabad County, Lorestan Province, Iran. At the 2006 census, its population was 162, in 28 families.
