= Darreh Eshgaft, Izeh =

Dareshkaft در اشکفت
- Village
- Location within Iran
- Coordinates: 31°56′27″N 49°39′35″E
- Country: Iran
- Province: Khuzestan
- County: Izeh
- Bakhsh: Central
- Rural District: Margha

Population (2006)
  - Total: 95
- Time zone: UTC+3:30 (IRST)
  - Summer (DST): UTC+4:30 (IRDT)

Dareshkaft (Persian: دره اشگفت; also known as Dareshgaft-e 'Olyā and Dareshkaft-e Bālā) is a village in Margha Rural District, in the Central District of Izeh County, Khuzestan province, Iran. At the 2006 census, its population was 95, in 15 families.
