= Dasht-e Lali Rural District =

Rural district in Khuzestan province, Iran

Dasht-e Lali Rural District Persian: دهستان دشت لالی
- Rural District
- Location within Iran
- Coordinates: 32°18′59″N 49°04′17″E
- Country: Iran
- Province: Khuzestan
- County: Lali
- District: Central
- Capital: Tatar

Population (2016)
  - Total: 4,714
- Time zone: UTC+3:30 (IRST)

Dasht-e Lali Rural District (Persian: دهستان دشت لالی) is in the Central District of Lali County, Khuzestan province, Iran. Its capital is the village of Tatar.

== Demographics ==
=== Population ===
At the time of the 2006 National Census, the rural district's population was 5,478 in 856 households. There were 5,644 inhabitants in 1,195 households at the following census of 2011. The 2016 census measured the population of the rural district as 4,714 in 1,084 households. The most populous of its 79 villages was Gach Gorsa, with 1,182 people.
