= Jastun Shah Rural District =

Rural district in Khuzestan province, Iran

Jastun Shah Rural District Persian: دهستان جاستون شهه
- Rural District
- Location within Iran
- Coordinates: 32°29′33″N 49°03′48″E
- Country: Iran
- Province: Khuzestan
- County: Lali
- District: Hati
- Capital: Valiabad

Population (2016)
  - Total: 3,317
- Time zone: UTC+3:30 (IRST)

Jastun Shah Rural District (Persian: دهستان جاستون شهه) is in Hati District of Lali County, Khuzestan province, Iran. Its capital is the village of Valiabad.

== Demographics ==
=== Population ===
At the time of the 2006 National Census, the rural district's population was 3,272 in 640 households. There were 3,298 inhabitants in 646 households at the following census of 2011. The 2016 census measured the population of the rural district as 3,317 in 753 households. The most populous of its 62 villages was Taraz (now a city), with 511 people.
