= Hati Rural District =

Rural district in Khuzestan province, Iran

Hati Rural District Persian: دهستان حتی
- Rural District
- Location within Iran
- Coordinates: 32°30′11″N 49°16′24″E
- Country: Iran
- Province: Khuzestan
- County: Lali
- District: Hati
- Capital: Hati

Population (2016)
  - Total: 5,555
- Time zone: UTC+3:30 (IRST)

Hati Rural District (Persian: دهستان حتی) is in Hati District of Lali County, Khuzestan province, Iran. Its capital is the village of Hati.

== Demographics ==
=== Population ===
At the time of the 2006 National Census, the rural district's population was 5,121 in 856 households. There were 4,856 inhabitants in 897 households at the following census of 2011. The 2016 census measured the population of the rural district as 5,555 in 1,194 households. The most populous of its 58 villages was Soltanabad, with 396 people.
