= Sadat Rural District =

Rural district in Khuzestan province, Iran

Sadat Rural District Persian: دهستان سادات
- Rural District
- Location within Iran
- Coordinates: 32°20′56″N 49°14′32″E
- Country: Iran
- Province: Khuzestan
- County: Lali
- District: Central
- Capital: Darreh Buri

Population (2016)
  - Total: 5,904
- Time zone: UTC+3:30 (IRST)

Sadat Rural District (Persian: دهستان سادات) is in the Central District of Lali County, Khuzestan province, Iran. Its capital is the village of Darreh Buri.

== Demographics ==
=== Population ===
At the time of the 2006 National Census, the rural district's population was 5,465 in 948 households. There were 5,656 inhabitants in 1,091 households at the following census of 2011. The 2016 census measured the population of the rural district as 5,904 in 1,346 households. The most populous of its 55 villages was Darreh Buri, with 1,330 people.
