= Central District (Lali County) =

District in Khuzestan province, Iran

Central District (Lali County) Persian: بخش مرکزی شهرستان لالی
- District
- Location within Iran
- Coordinates: 32°18′59″N 49°08′23″E
- Country: Iran
- Province: Khuzestan
- County: Lali
- Capital: Lali

Population (2016)
  - Total: 29,091
- Time zone: UTC+3:30 (IRST)

The Central District of Lali County (Persian: بخش مرکزی شهرستان لالی) is in Khuzestan province, Iran. Its capital is the city of Lali.

== Demographics ==
=== Population ===
At the time of the 2006 National Census, the district's population was 27,156 in 4,845 households. The following census in 2011 counted 29,045 people in 6,392 households. The 2016 census measured the population of the district as 29,091 inhabitants in 7,253 households.

=== Administrative divisions ===
Central District (Lali County) Population
Administrative Divisions	2006	2011	2016
Dasht-e Lali RD	5,478	5,644	4,714
Sadat RD	5,465	5,656	5,904
Lali (city)	16,213	17,745	18,473
Total	27,156	29,045	29,091
RD = Rural District
