= Hati District =

District in Khuzestan province, Iran

Hati District Persian: بخش حتی
- District
- Location within Iran
- Coordinates: 32°29′33″N 49°12′09″E
- Country: Iran
- Province: Khuzestan
- County: Lali
- Capital: Taraz

Population (2016)
  - Total: 8,872
- Time zone: UTC+3:30 (IRST)

Hati District (Persian: بخش حتی) (Note: Also Romanized as Hatti) is in Lali County, Khuzestan province, Iran. Its capital is the city of Taraz.

== Demographics ==
=== Population ===
At the time of the 2006 National Census, the district's population was 8,393 in 1,496 households. The following census in 2011 counted 8,154 people in 1,543 households. The 2016 census measured the population of the district as 8,872 inhabitants in 1,947 households.

In 2022, the village of Taraz was elevated to the status of a city.

=== Administrative divisions ===
Hati District Population
Administrative Divisions	2006	2011	2016
Hati RD	5,121	4,856	5,555
Jastun Shah RD	3,272	3,298	3,317
Taraz (city) (Note: Became a city after the 2016 census)			
Total	8,393	8,154	8,872
RD = Rural District
