= Lali County =

County in Khuzestan province, Iran

Lali County Persian: شهرستان لالی
- County
- Location of Lali County in Khuzestan province (top right, yellow)

- Location of Khuzestan province in Iran
- Coordinates: 32°25′N 49°12′E
- Country: Iran
- Province: Khuzestan
- Capital: Lali
- Districts: Central, Hati

Population (2016)
  - Total: 37,963
- Time zone: UTC+3:30 (IRST)

Lali County (Persian: شهرستان لالی) is in Khuzestan province, Iran. Its capital is the city of Lali.

== History ==
In 2022, the village of Taraz was elevated to the status of a city.

== Demographics ==
=== Population ===
At the time of the 2006 census, the county's population was 35,549 in 6,341 households. The following census in 2011 counted 37,381 people in 7,964 households. The 2016 census measured the population of the county as 37,963, in 9,200 households.

=== Administrative divisions ===
Lali County's population history and administrative structure over three consecutive censuses are shown in the following table.

Lali County Population
Administrative Divisions	2006	2011	2016
Central District	27,156	29,045	29,091
Dasht-e Lali RD	5,478	5,644	4,714
Sadat RD	5,465	5,656	5,904
Lali (city)	16,213	17,745	18,473
Hati District	8,393	8,154	8,872
Hati RD	5,121	4,856	5,555
Jastun Shah RD	3,272	3,298	3,317
Taraz (city) (Note: Became a city after the 2016 census)			
Total	35,549	37,381	37,963
RD = Rural District

== See also ==
Media related to Lali County at Wikimedia Commons
