= Do Ab =

Do Ab or Dow Ab or Du Ab or Doab or Dowab or Duab (Persian: دواب), meaning "two rivers", may refer to:

- Doab, a geographical feature in India
- Do Ab, Bamiyan, a village in Bamiyan Province, Afghanistan
- Do Ab (Iran), a rural area near Tehran, Iran
- Do Ab, Gilan, a village in Gilan Province, Iran
- Do Ab Mardakh, a village in Gilan Province, Iran
- Do Ab, Hormozgan, a village in Hormozgan Province, Iran
- Do Ab, Ilam, a village in Ilam Province, Iran
- Do Ab, Shirvan and Chardaval, a village in Ilam Province, Iran
- Do Ab, Kangavar, a village in Kermanshah Province, Iran
- Do Ab, Ravansar, a village in Kermanshah Province, Iran
- Doab, Sahneh, a village in Kermanshah Province, Iran
- Do Ab, Masjed Soleyman, a village in Masjed Soleyman County, Khuzestan Province, Iran
- Do Ab-e Bala, a village in Andimeshk County, Khuzestan Province, Iran
- Do Ab-e Huran, a village in Andimeshk County, Khuzestan Province, Iran
- Doab, Kohgiluyeh and Boyer-Ahmad, a village in Kohgiluyeh and Boyer-Ahmad Province, Iran
- Do Ab-e Kalus, a village in Kohgiluyeh and Boyer-Ahmad Province, Iran
- Do Ab, Lorestan, a village in Lorestan Province, Iran
- Do Ab, Markazi, a village in Markazi Province, Iran
- Do Ab, Mazandaran, a village in Mazandaran Province, Iran
- Do Ab, Nowshahr, a village in Mazandaran Province, Iran
- Bala Do Ab, a village in Savadkuh County, Mazandaran Province, Iran
- Pain Do Ab, a village in Savadkuh County, Mazandaran Province, Iran
- Do Ab Training Camp, Savadkuh County, Mazandaran Province
- Do Ab, North Khorasan, a village in North Khorasan Province, Iran
- Do Ab, Tehran, a village in Tehran Province, Iran
- Do Ab, West Azerbaijan, a village in West Azerbaijan Province, Iran
- Do Ab prison, a prison in Panjshir, Afghanistan
- Doab Rural District (Chaharmahal and Bakhtiari Province), Iran
- Doab Rural District (Lorestan Province), Iran
- Do Ab-e Mikh-e Zarrin, Afghanistan
- Do Ab-e Valian, Afghanistan
- Dow Ab-e Zivdar, Iran
- Du Ab District, Afghanistan
- Kaloch Do Ab, a village in Badakhshan province, Afghanistan

== See also ==
- Doabi dialect, a dialect of Punjabi spoken in Doab, India
