= Shirin Ab =

Shirin Ab (Persian: شيرين اب) may refer to:

- Shirin Ab, Kermanshah
- Shirin Ab, Andika, Khuzestan Province
- Shirin Ab, Mazu, Andimeshk County, Khuzestan Province
- Shirin Ab, Qilab, Andimeshk County, Khuzestan Province
- Shirin Ab, Dezful, Khuzestan Province
- Shirin Ab, Izeh, Khuzestan Province
- Shirin Ab, Lali, Khuzestan Province
- Shirin Ab, Kurdistan
- Shirin Ab, West Azerbaijan

== See also ==
- Ab Shirin (disambiguation)
