= Ab Shirin =

Ab Shirin or Abshirin (Persian: اب شيرين) may refer to:

- Ab Shirin, Firuzabad, Fars Province
- Ab Shirin, Mamasani, Fars Province
- Ab Shirin, Hormozgan
- Ab Shirin, Isfahan
- Ab Shirin, Kohgiluyeh and Boyer-Ahmad
- Ab Shirin, Sistan and Baluchestan

== See also ==
- Shirin Ab (disambiguation)
