= Shahzadeh Ahmad =

Shahzadeh Ahmad شاهزاده احمد
- Village
- Location within Iran
- Coordinates: 32°54′54″N 48°33′36″E
- Country: Iran
- Province: Khuzestan
- County: Andimeshk
- Bakhsh: Alvar-e Garmsiri
- Rural District: Mazu

Population (2006)
  - Total: 84
- Time zone: UTC+3:30 (IRST)
  - Summer (DST): UTC+4:30 (IRDT)

Shahzadeh Ahmad (Persian: شاهزاده احمد, also Romanized as Shāhzādeh Aḩmad and Shahzādeh Ahmad; also known as Āstāneh-ye Shāhzādeh Aḩmad and Āstāneh-ye Shāhzādeh-ye Aḩmad) is a village in Mazu Rural District, Alvar-e Garmsiri District, Andimeshk County, Khuzestan Province, Iran. At the 2006 census, its population was 84, in 19 families.
