= Pareh Kabud =

Pareh Kabud پره کبود
- Village
- Location within Iran
- Coordinates: 32°47′00″N 48°23′00″E
- Country: Iran
- Province: Khuzestan
- County: Andimeshk
- Bakhsh: Alvar-e Garmsiri
- Rural District: Qilab

Population (2006)
  - Total: 20
- Time zone: UTC+3:30 (IRST)
  - Summer (DST): UTC+4:30 (IRDT)

Pareh Kabud (Persian: پره کبود, also Romanized as Pareh Kabūd; also known as Par Kabūd) is a village in Qilab Rural District, Alvar-e Garmsiri District, Andimeshk County, Khuzestan Province, Iran. At the 2006 census, its population was 20, in 4 families.
