= Gol Mohak =

Gol Mohak گل مهک
- Village
- Location within Iran
- Coordinates: 32°38′30″N 48°18′59″E
- Country: Iran
- Province: Khuzestan
- County: Andimeshk
- Bakhsh: Alvar-e Garmsiri
- Rural District: Hoseyniyeh

Population (2006)
  - Total: 33
- Time zone: UTC+3:30 (IRST)
  - Summer (DST): UTC+4:30 (IRDT)

Gol Mohak (Persian: گل مهک, also Romanized as Gol Moḩak and Gol Maḩak) is a village in Hoseyniyeh Rural District, Alvar-e Garmsiri District, Andimeshk County, Khuzestan Province, Iran. At the 2006 census, its population was 33, in 9 families.
