= Taq Hoseyn-e Seyd Hadi =

Taq Hoseyn-e Seyd Hadi طاق حسین سیدهادی
- Village
- Location within Iran
- Coordinates: 32°37′07″N 48°11′11″E
- Country: Iran
- Province: Khuzestan
- County: Andimeshk
- Bakhsh: Alvar-e Garmsiri
- Rural District: Hoseyniyeh

Population (2006)
  - Total: 20
- Time zone: UTC+3:30 (IRST)
  - Summer (DST): UTC+4:30 (IRDT)

Taq Hoseyn-e Seyd Hadi (Persian: طاق حسین سیدهادی, also Romanized as Ţāq Ḩoseyn-e Şeyd Hādī; also known as Ţāq Ḩoseyn) is a village in Hoseyniyeh Rural District, Alvar-e Garmsiri District, Andimeshk County, Khuzestan Province, Iran. At the 2006 census, its population was 20, in 8 families.
