= Shahrak-e Ansar =

Shahrak-e Ansar شهرک انصار
- Village
- Location within Iran
- Coordinates: 32°24′50″N 48°18′26″E
- Country: Iran
- Province: Khuzestan
- County: Andimeshk
- Bakhsh: Central
- Rural District: Howmeh

Population (2006)
  - Total: 88
- Time zone: UTC+3:30 (IRST)
  - Summer (DST): UTC+4:30 (IRDT)

Shahrak-e Ansar (Persian: شهرک انصار, also Romanized as Shahrak-e Anşār) is a village in Howmeh Rural District, in the Central District of Andimeshk County, Khuzestan Province, Iran. At the 2006 census, its population was 88, composed of fourteen families.
