= Papiabad =

Papiabad پاپی‌آباد
- Village
- Location within Iran
- Coordinates: 32°17′38″N 48°16′27″E
- Country: Iran
- Province: Khuzestan
- County: Andimeshk
- Bakhsh: Central
- Rural District: Howmeh

Population (2006)
  - Total: 122
- Time zone: UTC+3:30 (IRST)
  - Summer (DST): UTC+4:30 (IRDT)

Papiabad (Persian: پاپی‌آباد, also Romanized as Pāpīābād) is a village in Howmeh Rural District, in the Central District of Andimeshk County, Khuzestan Province, Iran. At the 2006 census, its population was 122, in 21 families.
