= Karg Ab =

Karg Ab کرگ‌آب
- Village
- Location within Iran
- Coordinates: 32°49′49″N 48°37′03″E
- Country: Iran
- Province: Khuzestan
- County: Andimeshk
- Bakhsh: Alvar-e Garmsiri
- Rural District: Mazu

Population (2006)
  - Total: 35
- Time zone: UTC+3:30 (IRST)
  - Summer (DST): UTC+4:30 (IRDT)

Karg Ab (Persian: کرگ‌آب, also Romanized as Karg Āb; also known as Kargarāb) is a village in Mazu Rural District, Alvar-e Garmsiri District, Andimeshk County, Khuzestan Province, Iran. At the 2006 census, its population was 35, in 7 families.
