= Aliabad, Andimeshk =

Aliabad علی‌آباد
- Village
- Location within Iran
- Coordinates: 32°18′46″N 48°16′56″E
- Country: Iran
- Province: Khuzestan
- County: Andimeshk
- Bakhsh: Central
- Rural District: Howmeh

Population (2006)
  - Total: 505
- Time zone: UTC+3:30 (IRST)
  - Summer (DST): UTC+4:30 (IRDT)

Aliabad (Persian: علی‌آباد, also Romanized as ‘Alīābād) is a village in Howmeh Rural District, in the Central District of Andimeshk County, Khuzestan Province, Iran. At the 2006 census, its population was 505, in 111 families.
