= Vali Kuchekeh =

Vali Kuchekeh ولی کوچکه
- Village
- Location within Iran
- Coordinates: 32°46′01″N 48°12′24″E
- Country: Iran
- Province: Khuzestan
- County: Andimeshk
- Bakhsh: Alvar-e Garmsiri
- Rural District: Hoseyniyeh

Population (2006)
  - Total: 173
- Time zone: UTC+3:30 (IRST)
  - Summer (DST): UTC+4:30 (IRDT)

Vali Kuchekeh (Persian: ولی کوچکه, also Romanized as Valī Kūchekeh) is a village in Hoseyniyeh Rural District, Alvar-e Garmsiri District, Andimeshk County, Khuzestan Province, Iran. At the 2006 census, its population was 173, in 28 families.
