= Abd ol Rahman =

Abd ol Rahman عبدالرحمن
- Village
- Location within Iran
- Coordinates: 32°50′49″N 48°28′12″E
- Country: Iran
- Province: Khuzestan
- County: Andimeshk
- Bakhsh: Alvar-e Garmsiri
- Rural District: Qilab

Population (2006)
  - Total: 74
- Time zone: UTC+3:30 (IRST)
  - Summer (DST): UTC+4:30 (IRDT)

Abd ol Rahman (Persian: عبدالرحمن, also Romanized as ʿAbd ol Raḥman) is a village in Qilab Rural District, Alvar-e Garmsiri District, Andimeshk County, Khuzestan Province, Iran. At the 2006 census, its population was 74, in 13 families.
