= Kuhran =

Kuhran کوهران
- Village
- Location within Iran
- Coordinates: 32°49′00″N 48°37′00″E
- Country: Iran
- Province: Khuzestan
- County: Andimeshk
- Bakhsh: Alvar-e Garmsiri
- Rural District: Mazu

Population (2006)
  - Total: 43
- Time zone: UTC+3:30 (IRST)
  - Summer (DST): UTC+4:30 (IRDT)

Kuhran (Persian: کوهران, also Romanized as Kūhrān; also known as Kūhrū) is a village in Mazu Rural District, Alvar-e Garmsiri District, Andimeshk County, Khuzestan Province, Iran. At the 2006 census, its population was 43, in 10 families.
