= Chavani Ab Bahar =

Chavani Ab Bahar چاونی آب‌بهار
- Village
- Location within Iran
- Coordinates: 32°54′00″N 48°15′00″E
- Country: Iran
- Province: Khuzestan
- County: Andimeshk
- Bakhsh: Alvar-e Garmsiri
- Rural District: Qilab

Population (2006)
  - Total: 17
- Time zone: UTC+3:30 (IRST)
  - Summer (DST): UTC+4:30 (IRDT)

Chavani Ab Bahar (Persian: چاونی آب‌بهار, also romanized as Chāvanī Āb Bāhār; also known as Chāvanī Bāhār Āb) is a village in Qilab Rural District, Alvar-e Garmsiri District, Andimeshk County, Khuzestan Province, Iran. At the 2006 census, its population was 17, in 4 families.
