= Qarah Veysi =

Qarah Veysi قره‌ویسی
- Village
- Location within Iran
- Coordinates: 32°46′55″N 48°30′25″E
- Country: Iran
- Province: Khuzestan
- County: Andimeshk
- Bakhsh: Alvar-e Garmsiri
- Rural District: Mazu

Population (2006)
  - Total: 37
- Time zone: UTC+3:30 (IRST)
  - Summer (DST): UTC+4:30 (IRDT)

Qarah Veysi (Persian: قره‌ویسی, also Romanized as Qarah Veysī; also known as Qarah Veys) is a village in Mazu Rural District, Alvar-e Garmsiri District, Andimeshk County, Khuzestan Province, Iran. At the 2006 census, its population was 37, in 9 families.
