= Darhupal =

Darhupal درهوپل
- Village
- Location within Iran
- Coordinates: 32°48′06″N 48°24′10″E
- Country: Iran
- Province: Khuzestan
- County: Andimeshk
- Bakhsh: Alvar-e Garmsiri
- Rural District: Qilab

Population (2006)
  - Total: 50
- Time zone: UTC+3:30 (IRST)
  - Summer (DST): UTC+4:30 (IRDT)

Darhupal (Persian: درهوپل, also Romanized as Darhūpal; also known as Darhapal) is a village in Qilab Rural District, Alvar-e Garmsiri District, Andimeshk County, Khuzestan Province, Iran. At the 2006 census, its population was 50, in 9 families.
