= Dej Marij =

Dej Marij دجمریج
- Village
- Location within Iran
- Coordinates: 32°46′53″N 48°17′21″E
- Country: Iran
- Province: Khuzestan
- County: Andimeshk
- Bakhsh: Alvar-e Garmsiri
- Rural District: Qilab

Population (2006)
  - Total: 35
- Time zone: UTC+3:30 (IRST)
  - Summer (DST): UTC+4:30 (IRDT)

Dej Marij (Persian: دجمریج, also Romanized as Dej Marīj and Dej Merīj; also known as Dech Merīch and Dezh Mārīj) is a village in Qilab Rural District, Alvar-e Garmsiri District, Andimeshk County, Khuzestan Province, Iran. At the 2006 census, its population was 35, in 5 families.
