= Ab Nagun =

Ab Nagun آب‌نگون
- Village
- Location within Iran
- Coordinates: 32°54′13″N 48°37′44″E
- Country: Iran
- Province: Khuzestan
- County: Andimeshk
- Bakhsh: Alvar-e Garmsiri
- Rural District: Mazu

Population (2006)
  - Total: 36
- Time zone: UTC+3:30 (IRST)
  - Summer (DST): UTC+4:30 (IRDT)

Ab Nagun (Persian: آب‌نگون, also Romanized as Āb Nagūn and Ābnagūn) is a village in Mazu Rural District, Alvar-e Garmsiri District, Andimeshk County, Khuzestan province, Iran. At the 2006 census, its population was 36, in 9 families.
