= Sar Seyl-e Zardab-e Mohammad Taher =

Sar Seyl-e Zardab-e Mohammad Taher سرسیل زرداب محمدطاهر
- Village
- Location within Iran
- Coordinates: 32°51′00″N 48°23′00″E
- Country: Iran
- Province: Khuzestan
- County: Andimeshk
- Bakhsh: Alvar-e Garmsiri
- Rural District: Qilab

Population (2006)
  - Total: 192
- Time zone: UTC+3:30 (IRST)
  - Summer (DST): UTC+4:30 (IRDT)

Sar Seyl-e Zardab-e Mohammad Taher (Persian: سرسیل زرداب محمدطاهر, also Romanized as Sar Seyl-e Zardāb-e Moḩammad Ţāher; also known as Sar Seyl-e Zardābeh-ye Moḩammad Ţāher) is a village in Qilab Rural District, Alvar-e Garmsiri District, Andimeshk County, Khuzestan Province, Iran. At the 2006 census, its population was 192, in 32 families.
