= Dasht-e Laleh =

Dasht-e Laleh دشت لاله
- Village
- Location within Iran
- Coordinates: 32°56′00″N 48°32′00″E
- Country: Iran
- Province: Khuzestan
- County: Andimeshk
- Bakhsh: Alvar-e Garmsiri
- Rural District: Mazu

Population (2006)
  - Total: 132
- Time zone: UTC+3:30 (IRST)
  - Summer (DST): UTC+4:30 (IRDT)

Dasht-e Laleh (Persian: دشت لاله, also Romanized as Dasht-e Lāleh) is a village in Mazu Rural District, Alvar-e Garmsiri District, Andimeshk County, Khuzestan Province, Iran. At the 2006 census, its population was 132, in 22 families.
