= Sarnamak-e Darkul =

Sarnamak-e Darkul سرنمک درکول
- Village
- Location within Iran
- Coordinates: 32°50′16″N 48°30′05″E
- Country: Iran
- Province: Khuzestan
- County: Andimeshk
- Bakhsh: Alvar-e Garmsiri
- Rural District: Mazu

Population (2006)
  - Total: 88
- Time zone: UTC+3:30 (IRST)
  - Summer (DST): UTC+4:30 (IRDT)

Sarnamak-e Darkul (Persian: سرنمک درکول, also Romanized as Sarnamak-e Darkūl) is a village in Mazu Rural District, Alvar-e Garmsiri District, Andimeshk County, Khuzestan Province, Iran. At the 2006 census, its population was 88, in 16 families.
