= Qaleh Razeh =

Qaleh Razeh قلعه رزه
- Village
- Location within Iran
- Coordinates: 32°47′12″N 48°08′47″E
- Country: Iran
- Province: Khuzestan
- County: Andimeshk
- Bakhsh: Alvar-e Garmsiri
- Rural District: Hoseyniyeh

Population (2006)
  - Total: 527
- Time zone: UTC+3:30 (IRST)
  - Summer (DST): UTC+4:30 (IRDT)

Qaleh Razeh (Persian: قلعه رزه, also Romanized as Qal‘eh Razeh, Qal‘eh-i-Riza, Qal‘eh Razah, Qal‘eh Riza, and Qal‘eh-ye Razeh; also known as Razeh) is a village in Hoseyniyeh Rural District, Alvar-e Garmsiri District, Andimeshk County, Khuzestan Province, Iran. At the 2006 census, its population was 527, in 112 families.
