= Mohammad Khan, Khuzestan =

Mohammad Khan محمدخان
- Village
- Location within Iran
- Coordinates: 32°35′00″N 48°25′00″E
- Country: Iran
- Province: Khuzestan
- County: Andimeshk
- Bakhsh: Central
- Rural District: Howmeh

Population (2006)
  - Total: 333
- Time zone: UTC+3:30 (IRST)
  - Summer (DST): UTC+4:30 (IRDT)

Mohammad Khan (Persian: محمدخان, also Romanized as Moḩammad Khān; also known as Pāpī Kamp) is a village in Howmeh Rural District, in the Central District of Andimeshk County, Khuzestan Province, Iran. At the 2006 census, its population was 333, in 65 families.
