= Deh Iji =

Deh Iji ده یجی
- Village
- Location within Iran
- Coordinates: 32°21′18″N 48°15′32″E
- Country: Iran
- Province: Khuzestan
- County: Andimeshk
- Bakhsh: Central
- Rural District: Howmeh

Population (2006)
  - Total: 305
- Time zone: UTC+3:30 (IRST)
  - Summer (DST): UTC+4:30 (IRDT)

Deh Iji (Persian: ده یجی, also Romanized as Deh Ījī; also known as Da‘chī, Da echī, Da‘ījī, Deh Eījī, Deh Ichi, and Dehjī) is a village in Howmeh Rural District, in the Central District of Andimeshk County, Khuzestan Province, Iran. At the 2006 census, its population was 305, in 54 families.
