= Qaleh-ye Dez Do =

Qaleh-ye Dez Do قلعه دز دو
- Village
- Location within Iran
- Coordinates: 32°45′19″N 48°25′00″E
- Country: Iran
- Province: Khuzestan
- County: Andimeshk
- Bakhsh: Alvar-e Garmsiri
- Rural District: Qilab

Population (2006)
  - Total: 23
- Time zone: UTC+3:30 (IRST)
  - Summer (DST): UTC+4:30 (IRDT)

Qaleh-ye Dez Do (Persian: قلعه دز دو, also Romanized as Qal‘eh-ye Dez Do and Qal‘eh-ye Dozdū; also known as Qal‘eh Dez, Qal‘eh-ye Dez, and Qalmāb) is a village in Qilab Rural District, Alvar-e Garmsiri District, Andimeshk County, Khuzestan Province, Iran. At the 2006 census, its population was 23, in 4 families.
