= Kulak-e Bordabal =

Kulak-e Bordabal کولک بردبل
- Village
- Country: Iran
- Province: Khuzestan
- County: Andimeshk
- Bakhsh: Alvar-e Garmsiri
- Rural District: Mazu

Population (2006)
  - Total: 40
- Time zone: UTC+3:30 (IRST)
  - Summer (DST): UTC+4:30 (IRDT)

Kulak-e Bordabal (Persian: کولک بردبل, also Romanized as Kūlaḵ-e Bordabal) is a village in Mazu Rural District, Alvar-e Garmsiri District, Andimeshk County, Khuzestan Province, Iran. At the 2006 census, its population was 40, in 7 families.
