= Pifeh =

Village in Iran

Pifeh پیفه
- Village
- Location within Iran
- Coordinates: 32°57′27″N 48°30′16″E
- Country: Iran
- Province: Khuzestan
- County: Andimeshk
- Bakhsh: Alvar-e Garmsiri
- Rural District: Mazu

Population (2006)
  - Total: 27
- Time zone: UTC+3:30 (IRST)
  - Summer (DST): UTC+4:30 (IRDT)

Pifeh (Persian: پیفه, also romanized as Pīfeh) is a village in Mazu Rural District, Alvar-e Garmsiri District, Andimeshk County, Khuzestan Province, Iran. At the 2006 census its population was 27, in 6 families.
