= Tok Tokab =

Tok Tokab تک تک‌آب
- Village
- Location within Iran
- Coordinates: 32°42′00″N 48°14′59″E
- Country: Iran
- Province: Khuzestan
- County: Andimeshk
- Bakhsh: Alvar-e Garmsiri
- Rural District: Hoseyniyeh

Population (2006)
  - Total: 166
- Time zone: UTC+3:30 (IRST)
  - Summer (DST): UTC+4:30 (IRDT)

Tok Tokab (Persian: تک تک‌آب, also Romanized as Tok Tokāb; also known as Towk Towk Āb and Tūk Tūkāb) is a village in Hoseyniyeh Rural District, Alvar-e Garmsiri District, Andimeshk County, Khuzestan Province, Iran. At the 2006 census, its population was 166, in 34 families.
