= Sar Taf =

Sar Taf سرتاف
- Village
- Location within Iran
- Coordinates: 32°48′59″N 48°28′59″E
- Country: Iran
- Province: Khuzestan
- County: Andimeshk
- Bakhsh: Alvar-e Garmsiri
- Rural District: Qilab

Population (2006)
  - Total: 129
- Time zone: UTC+3:30 (IRST)
  - Summer (DST): UTC+4:30 (IRDT)

Sar Taf (Persian: سرتاف, also Romanized as Sar Tāf) is a village in Qilab Rural District, Alvar-e Garmsiri District, Andimeshk County, Khuzestan Province, Iran. At the 2006 census, its population was 129, in 22 families.
