= Ghol Gholab Balayi =

Ghol Gholab Balayi غل غلاب بالایی
- Village
- Country: Iran
- Province: Khuzestan
- County: Andimeshk
- Bakhsh: Alvar-e Garmsiri
- Rural District: Qilab

Population (2006)
  - Total: 32
- Time zone: UTC+3:30 (IRST)
  - Summer (DST): UTC+4:30 (IRDT)

Ghol Gholab Balayi (Persian: غل غلاب بالایی, also Romanized as Ghol Gholāb Bālāyī) is a village in Qilab Rural District, Alvar-e Garmsiri District, Andimeshk County, Khuzestan Province, Iran. At the 2006 census, its population was 32, in 5 families.
