= Chin-e Ruzah =

Chin-e Ruzah چین‌روزه
- Village
- Location within Iran
- Coordinates: 32°48′57″N 48°35′54″E
- Country: Iran
- Province: Khuzestan
- County: Andimeshk
- Bakhsh: Alvar-e Garmsiri
- Rural District: Mazu

Population (2006)
  - Total: 45
- Time zone: UTC+3:30 (IRST)
  - Summer (DST): UTC+4:30 (IRDT)

Chin-e Ruzah (Persian: چین‌روزه, also Romanized as Chīn-e Rūzah) is a village in Mazu Rural District, Alvar-e Garmsiri District, Andimeshk County, Khuzestan Province, Iran. At the 2006 census, its population was 45, in 9 families.
