= Gur-e Hasanali =

Gur-e Hasanali گورحسنعلی
- Village
- Location within Iran
- Coordinates: 32°43′10″N 48°15′15″E
- Country: Iran
- Province: Khuzestan
- County: Andimeshk
- Bakhsh: Alvar-e Garmsiri
- Rural District: Hoseyniyeh

Population (2006)
  - Total: 74
- Time zone: UTC+3:30 (IRST)
  - Summer (DST): UTC+4:30 (IRDT)

Gur-e Hasanali (Persian: گورحسنعلی, also Romanized as Gūr-e Ḩāsan‘alī, Gūr-e Ḩāsan ‘Alī, and Gūr Ḩasan ‘Alī) is a village in Hoseyniyeh Rural District, Alvar-e Garmsiri District, Andimeshk County, Khuzestan Province, Iran. At the 2006 census, its population was 74, in 15 families.
