= Takab (disambiguation) =

Takab is a city in West Azerbaijan Province, Iran.

Takab may also refer to:

== Places ==
- Takap or Takab, Khuzestan Province, Iran
- Takab Bandan, Khuzestan Province, Iran
- Takab County, West Azerbaijan Province, Iran

== Other uses ==
- Security Paper Mill (TAKAB), a paper mill and a subsidiary of the Central Bank of Iran

== See also ==
- Takab Rural District (disambiguation)
- Taqab (disambiguation)
