= Darreh-ye Gayelan =

Darreh-ye Gayelan دره گایلان
- Village
- Location within Iran
- Coordinates: 32°48′39″N 48°28′35″E
- Country: Iran
- Province: Khuzestan
- County: Andimeshk
- Bakhsh: Alvar-e Garmsiri
- Rural District: Qilab

Population (2006)
  - Total: 63
- Time zone: UTC+3:30 (IRST)
  - Summer (DST): UTC+4:30 (IRDT)

Darreh-ye Gayelan (Persian: دره گایلان, also Romanized as Darreh-ye Gāyelān; also known as Darreh Gavīlūn) is a village in Qilab Rural District, Alvar-e Garmsiri District, Andimeshk County, Khuzestan Province, Iran. At the 2006 census, its population was 63, in 11 families.
