= Mian Chak-e Talkor =

Mian Chak-e Talkor میان چاک تل‌کر
- Village
- Location within Iran
- Coordinates: 32°47′02″N 48°24′07″E
- Country: Iran
- Province: Khuzestan
- County: Andimeshk
- Bakhsh: Alvar-e Garmsiri
- Rural District: Qilab

Population (2006)
  - Total: 29
- Time zone: UTC+3:30 (IRST)
  - Summer (DST): UTC+4:30 (IRDT)

Mian Chak-e Talkor (Persian: میان چاک تل‌کر, also Romanized as Mīān Chāk-e Talkor; also known as Mīān Do Chāk) is a village in Qilab Rural District, Alvar-e Garmsiri District, Andimeshk County, Khuzestan Province, Iran. At the 2006 census, its population was 29, in 7 families.
