= Nimardi =

Nimardi نیمردی
- Village
- Location within Iran
- Coordinates: 32°51′00″N 48°28′00″E
- Country: Iran
- Province: Khuzestan
- County: Andimeshk
- Bakhsh: Alvar-e Garmsiri
- Rural District: Qilab

Population (2006)
  - Total: 64
- Time zone: UTC+3:30 (IRST)
  - Summer (DST): UTC+4:30 (IRDT)

Nimardi (Persian: نیمردی, also Romanized as Nīm Mardī) is a village in Qilab Rural District, Alvar-e Garmsiri District, Andimeshk County, Khuzestan Province, Iran. At the 2006 census, its population was 64, in 12 families.
