= Dasht-e Roba =

Dasht-e Roba دشت ربا
- Village
- Country: Iran
- Province: Khuzestan
- County: Andimeshk
- Bakhsh: Alvar-e Garmsiri
- Rural District: Qilab

Population (2006)
  - Total: 54
- Time zone: UTC+3:30 (IRST)
  - Summer (DST): UTC+4:30 (IRDT)

Dasht-e Roba (Persian: دشت ربا, also Romanized as Dasht-e Robā) is a village in Qilab Rural District, Alvar-e Garmsiri District, Andimeshk County, Khuzestan Province, Iran. At the 2006 census, its population was 54, in 9 families.
