= Golkapargeh =

Golkapargeh گل کپرگه
- Village
- Location within Iran
- Coordinates: 32°43′55″N 48°13′39″E
- Country: Iran
- Province: Khuzestan
- County: Andimeshk
- Bakhsh: Alvar-e Garmsiri
- Rural District: Hoseyniyeh

Population (2006)
  - Total: 100
- Time zone: UTC+3:30 (IRST)
  - Summer (DST): UTC+4:30 (IRDT)

Golkapargeh (Persian: گل کپرگه) is a village in Hoseyniyeh Rural District, Alvar-e Garmsiri District, Andimeshk County, Khuzestan Province, Iran. At the 2006 census, its population was 100, in 20 families.
