= Pol-e Azh =

Pol-e Azh پل آژ
- Village
- Country: Iran
- Province: Khuzestan
- County: Andimeshk
- Bakhsh: Alvar-e Garmsiri
- Rural District: Hoseyniyeh

Population (2006)
  - Total: 41
- Time zone: UTC+3:30 (IRST)
  - Summer (DST): UTC+4:30 (IRDT)

Pol-e Azh (Persian: پل آژ, also Romanized as Pol-e Āzh) is a village in Hoseyniyeh Rural District, Alvar-e Garmsiri District, Andimeshk County, Khuzestan Province, Iran. At the 2006 census, its population was 41, in 9 families.
