= Garmamir-e Bala =

Garmamir-e Bala گرمامیر بالا
- Village
- Location within Iran
- Coordinates: 32°43′25″N 48°22′56″E
- Country: Iran
- Province: Khuzestan
- County: Andimeshk
- Bakhsh: Alvar-e Garmsiri
- Rural District: Hoseyniyeh

Population (2006)
  - Total: 29
- Time zone: UTC+3:30 (IRST)
  - Summer (DST): UTC+4:30 (IRDT)

Garmamir-e Bala (Persian: گرمامیر بالا, also Romanized as Garmāmīr-e Bālā; also known as Garmāmīr) is a village in Hoseyniyeh Rural District, Alvar-e Garmsiri District, Andimeshk County, Khuzestan Province, Iran. At the 2006 census, its population was 29, in 9 families.
