= Ab Mishan =

Ab Mishan آب‌میشان
- Village
- Location within Iran
- Coordinates: 32°47′04″N 48°33′38″E
- Country: Iran
- Province: Khuzestan
- County: Andimeshk
- Bakhsh: Alvar-e Garmsiri
- Rural District: Mazu

Population (2006)
  - Total: 64
- Time zone: UTC+3:30 (IRST)
  - Summer (DST): UTC+4:30 (IRDT)

Ab Mishan (Persian: آب‌میشان, also Romanized as Āb Mīshān) is a village in Mazu Rural District, Alvar-e Garmsiri District, Andimeshk County, Khuzestan province, Iran. At the 2006 census, its population was 64, in 14 families.
