= Lirkhun =

Lirkhun لیرخون
- Village
- Location within Iran
- Coordinates: 32°52′25″N 48°31′06″E
- Country: Iran
- Province: Khuzestan
- County: Andimeshk
- Bakhsh: Alvar-e Garmsiri
- Rural District: Mazu

Population (2006)
  - Total: 22
- Time zone: UTC+3:30 (IRST)
  - Summer (DST): UTC+4:30 (IRDT)

Lirkhun (Persian: لیرخون, also Romanized as Līrkhūn; also known as Līrhān) is a village in Mazu Rural District, Alvar-e Garmsiri District, Andimeshk County, Khuzestan Province, Iran. At the 2006 census, its population was 22, in 5 families.
