= Kul Huni =

Kul Huni کولهونی
- Village
- Location within Iran
- Coordinates: 32°45′36″N 48°10′52″E
- Country: Iran
- Province: Khuzestan
- County: Andimeshk
- Bakhsh: Alvar-e Garmsiri
- Rural District: Hoseyniyeh

Population (2006)
  - Total: 27
- Time zone: UTC+3:30 (IRST)
  - Summer (DST): UTC+4:30 (IRDT)

Kul Huni (Persian: کولهونی, also Romanized as Kūl Hūnī; also known as Tappeh-ye Kūlhownī) is a village in Hoseyniyeh Rural District, Alvar-e Garmsiri District, Andimeshk County, Khuzestan Province, Iran. At the 2006 census, its population was 27, in 5 families.
