= Bidrubeh =

Bidrubeh (Persian: گبير) may refer to:

- Bidrubeh-ye Markazi
- Bidrubeh-ye Olya
- Bidrubeh-ye Sofla
- Bidrubeh Pumping Stations
