= Shahrak-e Shahid Madani =

Shahrak-e Shahid Madani شهرك شهيدمدني
- Village
- Location within Iran
- Coordinates: 32°21′16″N 48°12′59″E
- Country: Iran
- Province: Khuzestan
- County: Andimeshk
- Bakhsh: Central
- Rural District: Howmeh

Population (2006)
  - Total: 1,245
- Time zone: UTC+3:30 (IRST)
  - Summer (DST): UTC+4:30 (IRDT)

Shahrak-e Shahid Madani (Persian: شهرك شهيدمدني, also Romanized as Shahrak-e Shahīd Madanī; also known as Khammāţ) is a village in Howmeh Rural District, in the Central District of Andimeshk County, Khuzestan Province, Iran. At the 2006 census, its population was 1,245, in 264 families.
