= Amir Seyf =

Amir Seyf اميرسيف
- Village
- Location within Iran
- Coordinates: 32°48′31″N 48°18′06″E
- Country: Iran
- Province: Khuzestan
- County: Andimeshk
- Bakhsh: Alvar-e Garmsiri
- Rural District: Qilab

Population (2006)
  - Total: 89
- Time zone: UTC+3:30 (IRST)
  - Summer (DST): UTC+4:30 (IRDT)

Amir Seyf (Persian: اميرسيف, also Romanized as Amīr Seyf; also known as Amīr Seyt) is a village in Qilab Rural District, Alvar-e Garmsiri District, Andimeshk County, Khuzestan Province, Iran. At the 2006 census, its population was 89, in 18 families.
