= Deh-e Darreh =

Deh-e Darreh ده دره
- Village
- Location within Iran
- Coordinates: 32°50′41″N 48°25′19″E
- Country: Iran
- Province: Khuzestan
- County: Andimeshk
- Bakhsh: Alvar-e Garmsiri
- Rural District: Qilab

Population (2006)
  - Total: 146
- Time zone: UTC+3:30 (IRST)
  - Summer (DST): UTC+4:30 (IRDT)

Deh-e Darreh (Persian: ده دره, also Romanized as Deh-e Darreh, Deh Darah, and Deh Darreh) is a village in Qilab Rural District, Alvar-e Garmsiri District, Andimeshk County, Khuzestan Province, Iran. At the 2006 census, its population was 146, in 33 families.
