= Shahrak-e Eslamabad, Khuzestan =

Shahrak-e Eslamabad شهرک اسلام‌آباد
- Village
- Location within Iran
- Coordinates: 32°24′46″N 48°17′27″E
- Country: Iran
- Province: Khuzestan
- County: Andimeshk
- Bakhsh: Central
- Rural District: Howmeh

Population (2006)
  - Total: 1,365
- Time zone: UTC+3:30 (IRST)
  - Summer (DST): UTC+4:30 (IRDT)

Shahrak-e Eslamabad (Persian: شهرک اسلام‌آباد, also Romanized as Shahrak-e Eslāmābād; also known as Benvār-e Nāz̧er and Bonvār Nāz̧er) is a village in Howmeh Rural District, in the Central District of Andimeshk County, Khuzestan Province, Iran. At the 2006 census, its population was 1,365, in 274 families.
