= Talleh =

Talleh (Persian: تله) may refer to:

- Talleh-ye Bala
- Talleh Zang
- Talleh Zargeh

== See also ==
- Taleh, Iran (disambiguation)
