= Qalam Ab =

Qalam Ab قلم‌آب
- Village
- Location within Iran
- Coordinates: 32°46′25″N 48°28′40″E
- Country: Iran
- Province: Khuzestan
- County: Andimeshk
- Bakhsh: Alvar-e Garmsiri
- Rural District: Mazu

Population (2006)
  - Total: 55
- Time zone: UTC+3:30 (IRST)
  - Summer (DST): UTC+4:30 (IRDT)

Qalam Ab (Persian: قلم‌آب, also Romanized as Qalam Āb; also known as Kolanī-ye Qalam Āb) is a village in Mazu Rural District, Alvar-e Garmsiri District, Andimeshk County, Khuzestan Province, Iran. At the 2006 census, its population was 55, in 12 families.
