= Shahrak-e Emam Reza =

Shahrak-e Emam Reza شهرک امام‌رضا
- Village
- Location within Iran
- Coordinates: 32°22′21″N 48°17′54″E
- Country: Iran
- Province: Khuzestan
- County: Andimeshk
- Bakhsh: Central
- Rural District: Howmeh

Population (2006)
  - Total: 528
- Time zone: UTC+3:30 (IRST)
  - Summer (DST): UTC+4:30 (IRDT)

Shahrak-e Emam Reza (Persian: شهرک امام‌رضا, also Romanized as Shahrak-e Emām Reẕā; also known as Dobendār, Do Bondār, Dubandar, and Dūbendār) is a village in Howmeh Rural District, in the Central District of Andimeshk County, Khuzestan Province, Iran. At the 2006 census, its population was 528, in 125 families.
