= Shahrak-e Qaleh Mokhtar =

Shahrak-e Qaleh Mokhtar شهرك قلعه مختار
- Village
- Country: Iran
- Province: Khuzestan
- County: Andimeshk
- Bakhsh: Central
- Rural District: Howmeh

Population (2006)
  - Total: 319
- Time zone: UTC+3:30 (IRST)
  - Summer (DST): UTC+4:30 (IRDT)

Shahrak-e Qaleh Mokhtar (Persian: شهرك قلعه مختار, also Romanized as Shahrak-e Qal‘eh Mokhtār) is a village in Howmeh Rural District, in the Central District of Andimeshk County, Khuzestan Province, Iran. At the 2006 census, its population was 319, in 38 families.
