= Kornas =

Kornas کرناس
- Village
- Location within Iran
- Coordinates: 32°53′53″N 48°41′29″E
- Country: Iran
- Province: Khuzestan
- County: Andimeshk
- Bakhsh: Alvar-e Garmsiri
- Rural District: Mazu

Population (2006)
  - Total: 30
- Time zone: UTC+3:30 (IRST)
  - Summer (DST): UTC+4:30 (IRDT)

Kornas (Persian: کرناس, also Romanized as Kornās; also known as Dasteh Ney) is a village in Mazu Rural District, Alvar-e Garmsiri District, Andimeshk County, Khuzestan Province, Iran. At the 2006 census, its population was 30, in 6 families.
