= Bidrubeh-ye Olya =

Neighborhood in Khuzestan province, Iran

Bidrubeh-ye Olya Persian: بیدروبه علیا
- Neighborhood
- Location within Iran
- Coordinates: 32°45′44″N 48°13′40″E
- Country: Iran
- Province: Khuzestan
- County: Andimeshk
- District: Alvar-e Garmsiri
- City: Bidrubeh

Population (2006)
  - Total: 228
- Time zone: UTC+3:30 (IRST)

Bidrubeh-ye Olya (Persian: بیدروبه علیا) (Note: Also romanized as Bīdrūbeh-ye ‘Olyā) is a neighborhood of Bidrubeh in Alvar-e Garmsiri District of Andimeshk County, Khuzestan province, Iran.

== Demographics ==
=== Population ===
At the time of the 2006 National Census, Bidrubeh-ye Olya's population was 228 in 39 households, when it was a village in Hoseyniyeh Rural District. The village did not appear in the following census of 2011.

In 2013, the villages of Bidrubeh Pumping Stations, Bidrubeh-ye Markazi, Bidrubeh-ye Olya, Bidrubeh-ye Sofla, and Namak Talkeh-ye Rashnow merged to form the new city of Bidrubeh.
