= Do Ab-e Huran =

Do Ab-e Huran دوآب هوران
- Village
- Location within Iran
- Coordinates: 32°55′08″N 48°45′56″E
- Country: Iran
- Province: Khuzestan
- County: Andimeshk
- Bakhsh: Alvar-e Garmsiri
- Rural District: Mazu

Population (2006)
  - Total: 24
- Time zone: UTC+3:30 (IRST)
  - Summer (DST): UTC+4:30 (IRDT)

Do Ab-e Huran (Persian: دوآب هوران, also Romanized as Do Āb-e Hūrān; also known as Do Āb and Dow Āb) is a village in Mazu Rural District, Alvar-e Garmsiri District, Andimeshk County, Khuzestan Province, Iran. At the 2006 census, its population was 24, in 5 families.
