= Sorkhakan, Khuzestan =

Village in Khuzestan province, Iran

Sorkhakan Persian: سرخکان
- Village
- Location within Iran
- Coordinates: 32°46′41″N 48°19′29″E
- Country: Iran
- Province: Khuzestan
- County: Andimeshk
- District: Alvar-e Garmsiri
- Rural District: Qilab

Population (2016)
  - Total: 280
- Time zone: UTC+3:30 (IRST)

Sorkhakan (Persian: سرخکان) (Note: Also romanized as Sorkh Kan and Sorkh Kān) is a village in, and the capital of, Qilab Rural District of Alvar-e Garmsiri District, Andimeshk County, Khuzestan province, Iran.

== Demographics ==
=== Population ===
At the time of the 2006 National Census, the village's population was 347 in 72 households. The following census in 2011 counted 343 people in 84 households. The 2016 census measured the population of the village as 280 people in 76 households.
