= Namak Talkeh-ye Rashnow =

Neighborhood in Khuzestan province, Iran

Namak Talkeh-ye Rashnow Persian: نمک تلخه رشنو
- Neighborhood
- Location within Iran
- Coordinates: 32°44′35″N 48°14′32″E
- Country: Iran
- Province: Khuzestan
- County: Andimeshk
- District: Alvar-e Garmsiri
- City: Bidrubeh

Population (2011)
  - Total: 154
- Time zone: UTC+3:30 (IRST)

Namak Talkeh-ye Rashnow (Persian: نمک تلخه رشنو) (Note: Also known as Rashnoodi, Rashnū, and Rashnūdī) is a neighborhood of Bidrubeh in Alvar-e Garmsiri District of Andimeshk County, Khuzestan province, Iran.

== Demographics ==
=== Population ===
At the time of the 2006 National Census, Namak Talkeh-ye Rashnow's population was 224 in 48 households, when it was a village in Hoseyniyeh Rural District. The following census in 2011 counted 154 people in 44 households.

In 2013, the villages of Bidrubeh Pumping Stations, Bidrubeh-ye Markazi, Bidrubeh-ye Olya, Bidrubeh-ye Sofla, and Namak Talkeh-ye Rashnow merged to form the new city of Bidrubeh.
