= Edrisi-ye Sofla =

Edrisi-ye Sofla ادریسی سفلی
- Village
- Location within Iran
- Coordinates: 32°48′42″N 48°32′01″E
- Country: Iran
- Province: Khuzestan
- County: Andimeshk
- Bakhsh: Alvar-e Garmsiri
- Rural District: Mazu

Population (2006)
  - Total: 156
- Time zone: UTC+3:30 (IRST)
  - Summer (DST): UTC+4:30 (IRDT)

Edrisi-ye Sofla (Persian: ادریسی سفلی, also Romanized as Edrīsī-ye Soflá; also known as Edrīsī) is a village in Mazu Rural District, Alvar-e Garmsiri District, Andimeshk County, Khuzestan Province, Iran. At the 2006 census, its population was 156, in 38 families.
