= Talleh Zang =

Talleh Zang تله زنگ
- Village
- Location within Iran
- Coordinates: 32°49′01″N 48°46′13″E
- Country: Iran
- Province: Khuzestan
- County: Andimeshk
- Bakhsh: Alvar-e Garmsiri
- Rural District: Mazu

Population (2006)
  - Total: 540
- Time zone: UTC+3:30 (IRST)
  - Summer (DST): UTC+4:30 (IRDT)

Talleh Zang (Persian: تله زنگ, also Romanized as Taleh Zang and Talleh Zang-e Pā'īn) is a village in Mazu Rural District, Alvar-e Garmsiri District, Andimeshk County, Khuzestan Province, Iran. At the 2006 census, its population was 540, in 104 families.
