= Takht Arreh =

Takht Arreh (Persian: تخت اره) may refer to:

- Takht Arreh 1
- Takht Arreh 2
