= Chichali =

Chichali (Persian: چيچالي) may refer to:

- Chichali Ahmad, Ben Moala Rural District, Khuzestan Province, Iran
- Chichali Gholamreza, Howmeh Rural District, Khuzestan Province, Iran
- Chichali (archaeological site), an archaeological site in India
