= Jurvand =

Village in Khuzestan province, Iran

Jurvand Persian: جوروند
- Village
- Location within Iran
- Coordinates: 32°50′45″N 48°27′02″E
- Country: Iran
- Province: Khuzestan
- County: Andimeshk
- District: Alvar-e Garmsiri
- Rural District: Qilab

Population (2016)
  - Total: 604
- Time zone: UTC+3:30 (IRST)

Jurvand (Persian: جوروند) (Note: Also romanized as Jowrvand and Jūrvand; also known as Jorwand) is a village in Qilab Rural District of Alvar-e Garmsiri District, Andimeshk County, Khuzestan province, Iran.

== Demographics ==
=== Population ===
At the time of the 2006 National Census, the village's population was 622 in 118 households. The following census in 2011 counted 629 people in 145 households. The 2016 census measured the population of the village as 604 people in 156 households. It was the most populous village in its rural district.
