= Chichali Gholamreza =

Chichali Gholamreza چیچالی غلامرضا
- Village
- Location within Iran
- Coordinates: 32°21′53″N 48°10′21″E
- Country: Iran
- Province: Khuzestan
- County: Andimeshk
- Bakhsh: Central
- Rural District: Howmeh

Population (2006)
  - Total: 107
- Time zone: UTC+3:30 (IRST)
  - Summer (DST): UTC+4:30 (IRDT)

Chichali Gholamreza (Persian: چیچالی غلامرضا, also Romanized as Chīchālī Gholāmreẕā; also known as Chīchālī-e Seh and) is a village in Howmeh Rural District, in the Central District of Andimeshk County, Khuzestan Province, Iran. At the 2006 census, its population was 107, in 20 families.
