= Bidrubeh-ye Markazi =

Neighborhood in Khuzestan province, Iran

Bidrubeh-ye Markazi Persian: بیدرویه مرکزی
- Neighborhood
- Location within Iran
- Coordinates: 32°45′40″N 48°14′15″E
- Country: Iran
- Province: Khuzestan
- County: Andimeshk
- District: Alvar-e Garmsiri
- City: Bidrubeh

Population (2011)
  - Total: 2,579
- Time zone: UTC+3:30 (IRST)

Bidrubeh-ye Markazi (Persian: بیدرویه مرکزی) (Note: Also romanized as Bīdrūbeh-ye Markazī; also known as Bīdrūbeh-ye Vosţá) is a neighborhood of Bidrubeh in Alvar-e Garmsiri District of Andimeshk County, Khuzestan province, Iran.

== Demographics ==
=== Population ===
At the time of the 2006 National Census, Bidrubeh-ye Markazi's population was 1,904 in 382 households, when it was a village in Hoseyniyeh Rural District. The following census in 2011 counted 2,579 people in 637 households.

In 2013, the villages of Bidrubeh Pumping Stations, Bidrubeh-ye Markazi, Bidrubeh-ye Olya, Bidrubeh-ye Sofla, and Namak Talkeh-ye Rashnow merged to form the new city of Bidrubeh.
