= Golkhaneh =

Golkhaneh (Persian: گلخانه) may refer to:

- Golkhaneh, Afghanistan
- Golkhaneh, Iran
