= Bidrubeh-ye Sofla =

Neighborhood in Khuzestan province, Iran

Bidrubeh-ye Sofla Persian: بیدروبه سفلی
- Neighborhood
- Location within Iran
- Coordinates: 32°45′07″N 48°14′14″E
- Country: Iran
- Province: Khuzestan
- County: Andimeshk
- District: Alvar-e Garmsiri
- City: Bidrubeh

Population (2006)
  - Total: 99
- Time zone: UTC+3:30 (IRST)

Bidrubeh-ye Sofla (Persian: بیدروبه سفلی) (Note: Also romanized as Bīdrūbeh-ye Soflá; also known as Bīd Rooyeh Fath Alī, Bīdrūbeh, Bīdrū”īyeh Falḩ‘alī, Bīdrūweh, and Bīdrūye-ye Fatḩ‘alī) is a neighborhood of Bidrubeh in Alvar-e Garmsiri District of Andimeshk County, Khuzestan province, Iran.

== Demographics ==
=== Population ===
At the time of the 2006 National Census, Bidrubeh-ye Sofla's population was 99 in 24 households, when it was a village in Hoseyniyeh Rural District. The village did not appear in the following census of 2011.

In 2013, the villages of Bidrubeh Pumping Stations, Bidrubeh-ye Markazi, Bidrubeh-ye Olya, Bidrubeh-ye Sofla, and Namak Talkeh-ye Rashnow merged to form the new city of Bidrubeh.
