= Shirin Ab, Qilab =

Shirin Ab شیرین‌آب
- Village
- Location within Iran
- Coordinates: 32°47′01″N 48°17′51″E
- Country: Iran
- Province: Khuzestan
- County: Andimeshk
- Bakhsh: Alvar-e Garmsiri
- Rural District: Qilab

Population (2006)
  - Total: 87
- Time zone: UTC+3:30 (IRST)
  - Summer (DST): UTC+4:30 (IRDT)

Shirin Ab (Persian: شیرین‌آب, also Romanized as Shīrīn Āb) is a village in Qilab Rural District, Alvar-e Garmsiri District, Andimeshk County, Khuzestan Province, Iran. At the 2006 census, its population was 87, in 16 families.
