= Shahrak-e Do Kuheh =

Village in Khuzestan province, Iran

Shahrak-e Do Kuheh Persian: شهرک دوکوهه
- Village
- Location within Iran
- Coordinates: 32°32′04″N 48°18′58″E
- Country: Iran
- Province: Khuzestan
- County: Andimeshk
- District: Central
- Rural District: Howmeh

Population (2016)
  - Total: 2,922
- Time zone: UTC+3:30 (IRST)

Shahrak-e Do Kuheh (Persian: شهرک دوکوهه) (Note: Also romanized as Shahrak-e Do Kūheh) is a village in Howmeh Rural District of the Central District of Andimeshk County, Khuzestan province, Iran.

== Demographics ==
=== Population ===
At the time of the 2006 National Census, the village's population was 1,485 in 329 households. The following census in 2011 counted 2,511 people in 666 households. The 2016 census measured the population of the village as 2,922 people in 803 households. It was the most populous village in its rural district.
