= Edrisi-ye Olya =

Edrisi-ye Olya ادریسی علیا
- Village
- Location within Iran
- Coordinates: 32°49′36″N 48°32′32″E
- Country: Iran
- Province: Khuzestan
- County: Andimeshk
- Bakhsh: Alvar-e Garmsiri
- Rural District: Mazu

Population (2006)
  - Total: 197
- Time zone: UTC+3:30 (IRST)
  - Summer (DST): UTC+4:30 (IRDT)

Edrisi-ye Olya (Persian: ادریسی علیا, also Romanized as Edrīsī-ye ‘Olyā) is a village in Mazu Rural District, Alvar-e Garmsiri District, Andimeshk County, Khuzestan Province, Iran. At the 2006 census, its population was 197, in 39 families.
