= Mazu, Iran =

Village in Khuzestan province, Iran

Mazu Persian: مازو
- Village
- Location within Iran
- Coordinates: 32°47′15″N 48°30′36″E
- Country: Iran
- Province: Khuzestan
- County: Andimeshk
- District: Alvar-e Garmsiri
- Rural District: Mazu

Population (2016)
  - Total: 416
- Time zone: UTC+3:30 (IRST)

Mazu (Persian: مازو) (Note: Also romanized as Māzū) is a village in, and the capital of, Mazu Rural District of Alvar-e Garmsiri District, Andimeshk County, Khuzestan province, Iran.

== Demographics ==
=== Population ===
At the time of the 2006 National Census, the village's population was 498 in 111 households. The following census in 2011 counted 427 people in 117 households. The 2016 census measured the population of the village as 416 people in 115 households. It was the most populous village in its rural district.
