= Takap =

Takap تاکاپ
- Village
- Location within Iran
- Coordinates: 32°47′46″N 48°19′29″E
- Country: Iran
- Province: Khuzestan
- County: Andimeshk
- Bakhsh: Alvar-e Garmsiri
- Rural District: Qilab

Population (2006)
  - Total: 146
- Time zone: UTC+3:30 (IRST)
  - Summer (DST): UTC+4:30 (IRDT)

Takap (Persian: تاکاپ, also Romanized as Tāḵāp; also known as Tāg Āb, Tākāb, and Talkāb) is a village in Qilab Rural District, Alvar-e Garmsiri District, Andimeshk County, Khuzestan Province, Iran. At the 2006 census, its population was 146, in 28 families.
