= Taqab, Khuzestan =

Taqab تاقاب
- Village
- Location within Iran
- Coordinates: 32°44′24″N 48°17′01″E
- Country: Iran
- Province: Khuzestan
- County: Andimeshk
- Bakhsh: Alvar-e Garmsiri
- Rural District: Hoseyniyeh

Population (2006)
  - Total: 152
- Time zone: UTC+3:30 (IRST)
  - Summer (DST): UTC+4:30 (IRDT)

Taqab (Persian: تاقاب, also Romanized as Tāqāb) is a village in Hoseyniyeh Rural District, Alvar-e Garmsiri District, Andimeshk County, Khuzestan Province, Iran. At the 2006 census, its population was 152, in 33 families.
