= Edrisi, Iran =

Edrisi (Persian: ادريسي) may refer to:

- Edrisi-ye Olya
- Edrisi-ye Sofla
