= Valian =

Valian or Vilian (Persian: وليان) may refer to:

- Mohammad Amin Valian (born 1989), Iranian activist
- Dahan-e Valian, a village in Baghlan Province, Afghanistan
- Do Ab-e Valian, a village in Baghlan Province, Afghanistan
- Valian, Alborz, a village in Alborz Province, Iran
- Valian, Lorestan, a village in Lorestan Province, Iran
