= Sar Ziarat, Khuzestan =

Sar Ziarat سرزیارت
- Village
- Location within Iran
- Coordinates: 32°53′00″N 48°17′00″E
- Country: Iran
- Province: Khuzestan
- County: Andimeshk
- Bakhsh: Alvar-e Garmsiri
- Rural District: Qilab

Population (2006)
  - Total: 20
- Time zone: UTC+3:30 (IRST)
  - Summer (DST): UTC+4:30 (IRDT)

Sar Ziarat (Persian: سرزیارت, also romanized as Sar Zīārat) is a village in Qilab Rural District, Alvar-e Garmsiri District, Andimeshk County, Khuzestan Province, Iran. At the 2006 census, its population was 20, in 6 families.
