= Kohnab-e Bala, Khuzestan =

Kohnab-e Bala کهناب بالا
- Village
- Location within Iran
- Coordinates: 32°43′42″N 48°18′33″E
- Country: Iran
- Province: Khuzestan
- County: Andimeshk
- Bakhsh: Alvar-e Garmsiri
- Rural District: Hoseyniyeh

Population (2006)
  - Total: 29
- Time zone: UTC+3:30 (IRST)
  - Summer (DST): UTC+4:30 (IRDT)

Kohnab-e Bala (Persian: کهناب بالا, also Romanized as Kohnāb-e Bālā; also known as Do Āb-e Bālā, Konāb, and Konāb-e Bālā) is a village in Hoseyniyeh Rural District, Alvar-e Garmsiri District, Andimeshk County, Khuzestan Province, Iran. At the 2006 census, its population was 29, in 6 families.
