= Sar Ziarat =

Sar Ziarat (Persian: سرزيارت) may refer to:

- Sar Ziarat, Alborz
- Sar Ziarat, Khuzestan
