= Golkhaneh, Iran =

Village in Khuzestan province, Iran

Golkhaneh Persian: گلخانه
- Village
- Location within Iran
- Coordinates: 32°37′55″N 48°17′08″E
- Country: Iran
- Province: Khuzestan
- County: Andimeshk
- District: Alvar-e Garmsiri
- Rural District: Hoseyniyeh

Population (2016)
  - Total: 370
- Time zone: UTC+3:30 (IRST)

Golkhaneh (Persian: گلخانه) (Note: Also romanized as Golkhāneh) is a village in Hoseyniyeh Rural District of Alvar-e Garmsiri District, Andimeshk County, Khuzestan province, Iran.

== Demographics ==
=== Population ===
At the time of the 2006 National Census, the village's population was 377 in 70 households. The following census in 2011 counted 377 people in 86 households. The 2016 census measured the population of the village as 370 people in 88 households. It was the most populous village in its rural district.
