= Bidrubeh, Iran =

City in Khuzestan province, Iran

Bidrubeh Persian: بيدروبه
- City
- Location within Iran
- Coordinates: 32°45′37″N 48°14′14″E
- Country: Iran
- Province: Khuzestan
- County: Andimeshk
- District: Alvar-e Garmsiri

Population (2016)
  - Total: 2,386
- Time zone: UTC+3:30 (IRST)

Bidrubeh (Persian: بيدروبه) is a city in Alvar-e Garmsiri District of Andimeshk County, Khuzestan province, Iran. It is the merger of the former villages of Bidrubeh Pumping Stations, Bidrubeh-ye Markazi, Bidrubeh-ye Olya, Bidrubeh-ye Sofla, and Namak Talkeh-ye Rashnow.

== Demographics ==
=== Population ===
At the time of the 2006 National Census, the population (as the total of its constituent villages before the merger) was 2,554 in 511 households, when it was in Hoseyniyeh Rural District. The following census in 2011 counted 2,799 people in 696 households. The 2016 census measured the population as 2,386 people in 633 households, by which time the five villages had merged to form the new city of Bidrubeh.
