= Rashnudi =

Rashnudi may refer to:

- Rashnudi, Khuzestan
- Rashnudi, Lorestan
