= Kuran Castle =

Castle in Khuzestan Province, Iran

Kuran castle
- قلعه کوران

General information
- Type: Castle
- Location: Andimeshk County, Iran

Kuran castle (Persian: قلعه کوران) is a historical castle located in Andimeshk County in Khuzestan Province, Iran. The longevity of this fortress dates back to the Safavid dynasty.
