= Cham Golak =

City in Khuzestan province, Iran

Cham Golak Persian: چم گلک
- City
- Location within Iran
- Coordinates: 32°26′47″N 48°26′41″E
- Country: Iran
- Province: Khuzestan
- County: Andimeshk
- District: Central

Population (2016)
  - Total: 5,446
- Time zone: UTC+3:30 (IRST)
- Website: chamgolak.ostan-khz.ir

Cham Golak (Persian: چم گلک) (Note: Also romanized as Cham-e Golak, Chamgalak, and Chamgolak; also known as Chamgūlak) is a city in the Central District of Andimeshk County, Khuzestan province, Iran.

== Demographics ==
=== Population ===
At the time of the 2006 National Census, Cham Golak's population was 2,980 in 579 households, when it was a village in Howmeh Rural District. The following census in 2011 counted 4,046 people in 1,024 households. The 2016 census measured the population as 5,446 people in 1,468 households, by which time Cham Golak had been elevated to the status of a city.
