= Taqab =

Taqab (Persian: تاقاب or تقاب) may refer to:

- Taqab, Khuzestan (تاقاب - Tāqāb)
- Taqab, South Khorasan (تقاب - Taqāb)

== See also ==
- Takab (disambiguation)
