= Razeh Castle =

Castle in Khuzestan Province, Iran

Razeh castle
- قلعه رزه

General information
- Type: Castle
- Location: Andimeshk County, Iran

Razeh castle (Persian: قلعه رزه) is a historical castle located in Andimeshk County in Khuzestan Province, The longevity of this fortress dates back to the Safavid dynasty.
