= Hosseini Castle =

Castle in Khuzestan Province, Iran

Hosseini castle
- قلعه حسینی

General information
- Type: Castle
- Location: Andimeshk County, Iran

Hosseini castle (Persian: قلعه حسینی) is a historical castle located in Andimeshk County in Khuzestan Province, The longevity of this fortress dates back to the Safavid dynasty.
