= Taleh, Iran =

Taleh (Persian: طاله or تله) in Iran may refer to:

- Taleh, Mazandaran (تله - Taleh)
- Taleh, Qazvin (طاله - Ţāleh)

== See also ==
- Talleh (disambiguation)
