= Azadi, Andimeshk =

City in Khuzestan province, Iran

Azadi Persian: آزادی
- City
- Location within Iran
- Coordinates: 32°24′13″N 48°15′02″E
- Country: Iran
- Province: Khuzestan
- County: Andimeshk
- District: Central

Population (2016)
  - Total: 4,957
- Time zone: UTC+3:30 (IRST)
- Area code: 061

Azadi (Persian: آزادی) (Note: formerly the village of Shahrak-e Babak (شهرك بابك), also romanized as Shahrak-e Bābāk; also known as Shahrak-e Āzādī) is a city in the Central District of Andimeshk County, Khuzestan province, Iran, serving as the administrative center for Howmeh Rural District.

== Demographics ==
=== Population ===
At the time of the 2006 National Census, the population was 4,576 in 925 households, when it was the village of Shahrak-e Babak in Howmeh Rural District. The following census in 2011 counted 4,655 people in 1,205 households. The 2016 census measured the population as 4,957 people in 1,354 households, by which time the village had been elevated to the status of a city as Azadi.
