= Hoseyniyeh, Khuzestan =

City in Khuzestan province, Iran

Hoseyniyeh Persian: حسينيه
- City
- Location within Iran
- Coordinates: 32°40′57″N 48°14′45″E
- Country: Iran
- Province: Khuzestan
- County: Andimeshk
- District: Alvar-e Garmsiri

Population (2016)
  - Total: 1,821
- Time zone: UTC+3:30 (IRST)

Hoseyniyeh (Persian: حسينيه) (Note: Also romanized as Ḩoseynīyeh; also known as Ḩoseymīeh, Ḩoseynīyeh-ye Khodā Dād, Ḩoseynīyeh-ye ‘Olyā, and Qal‘eh Hūsaīnīyeh) is a city in, and the capital of, Alvar-e Garmsiri District of Andimeshk County, Khuzestan province, Iran. It also serves as the administrative center for Hoseyniyeh Rural District.

== Demographics ==
=== Population ===
At the time of the 2006 National Census, the city's population was 1,863 in 405 households. The following census in 2011 counted 1,963 people in 506 households. The 2016 census measured the population of the city as 1,821 people in 533 households.
