= Andimeshk =

City in Khuzestan province, Iran

Andimeshk اندیمشک
- City
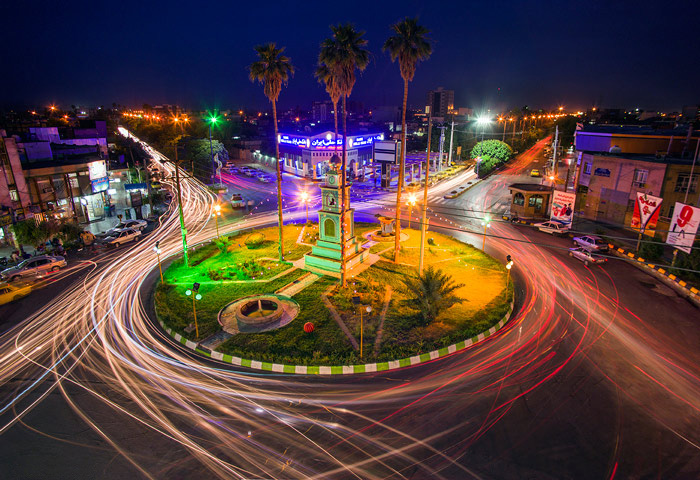
- Andimeshk
- Nicknames: اری ترین, اندیمشک, لور, سال‌آباد, اردریکا
- Location within Iran
- Coordinates: 32°28′17″N 48°20′56″E
- Country: Iran
- Province: Khuzestan
- County: Andimeshk
- District: Central
- Elevation: 176 m (577 ft)

Population (2016)
  - Total: 135,116
- Time zone: UTC+3:30 (IRST)
- Website: www.andimeshk.ir

Andimeshk (Persian: اندیمشک) (Note: Also romanized as Āndīmeshḵ) is a city in the Central District of Andimeshk County, Khuzestan province, Iran, serving as capital of both the county and the district. The city is about 34 kilometres (21 mi) north of Shush, on the main road and the rail line between Tehran and Ahvaz.

== Demographics ==
=== Population ===
Population history
Year	Pop.	±%
1956	7,324	—
1966	16,195	+121.1%
1976	32,085	+98.1%
1986	56,288	+75.4%
1991	73,759	+31.0%
1996	106,923	+45.0%
2006	119,422	+11.7%
2011	126,811	+6.2%
2016	135,116	+6.5%

At the time of the 2006 National Census, the city's population was 119,422 in 26,140 households. The following census in 2011 counted 126,811 people in 32,904 households. The 2016 census measured the population of the city as 135,116 people in 39,151 households.

== History ==
The name first appears in cuneiform tablets from Mesopotamia from the Ur III period (21st to 20th century BCE) in the form "Adamshakh", with a probable meaning "Crocodile (Town)". Later it was called "Andamaska" or "Andimaska", meaning "plenty of butter"; local villages like Gheel-AB and Lour and two fortresses were added to it. The city was en route to Elam and Anshan and subsequently to Lorestan, which made it strategically important until the late Sasanian era.

In the Andimeshk region, an individual known as Saleh-Khan Mukri (a Kurd from Kermanshah and the ruler of Shushtar during the Qajar era) built several buildings, including a fortress, for his residence, which became known as Saleh Castle or Lor Castle. During the reign of Reza Shah Pahlavi and the construction of the Trans-Iranian Railway, Andimeshk railway station was built in the vicinity of Lor Castle, and Andimeshk gradually expanded with the start of construction around it.

At the same time, the American General Motors Company established a branch of its military automobile factory in this city. During the reign of Mohammad Reza Pahlavi, with the arrival of numerous domestic and foreign companies, Andimeshk became an industrial city and thus hosted thousands of domestic and foreign doctors, engineers, employees and workers. It was during this period that Andimeshk traveled the path of expansion and progress

During the Pahlavi era, Andimeshk received a great deal of modern development projects because of its location and resources. These included a railway, the Dokoohe military depot and an aluminum factory-silo, as well as many other industrial developments. The city had been connected along the Trans-Iranian Railway in 1929. During World War II a pipeline was also laid from Abadan, then the location of the world's largest refinery, to Andimeshk; from there the fuel was re-loaded onto trucks and transported to the Soviet Union through the Persian Corridor. In 1955, the pipeline was extended from Andimeshk to Tehran.

== Archaeology ==
North Khuzestan was home to some of the oldest civilizations in the world. The Choghamish hills have more than 8,000 years of treasures from different periods, and archaeologists have called on the city of dawn. Susa's Zanbil temple date to 3,000 years ago. Apadana Palace is a major Achaemenid site in Susa. Shushtar Historical Hydraulic System were registered as a UNESCO World Heritage Site in 2009. Cole Farah Izeh and Lure area in the west of Andimeshk County.

== Famous dams ==
=== Karkheh Dam ===
The Karkheh dam is located on the Karkheh River in the north-western province of Khuzestan, the closest city being Andimeshk to the east. It is 127 metres high, with a reservoir capacity of 5.9 billion cubic metres. It has damaged wild life down stream, including the city Shoush, located roughly 20-30 km south. The Karkheh Dam is designed to irrigate 320,000 hectares of land, produce 520 MW of hydro-electricity and prevent downstream floods. In 1956, studies began on the Karkheh Dam by the American company Development and Resources Corporation, which was headed by David E. Lilienthal, the former chairman of the TVA. In 1990, the final studies were completed by Mahab Ghods Consulting Engineers. The engineering division of the Islamic Revolutionary Guards Corps (IRGC) started construction on the Karkheh Dam in 1992 and the dam was complete in 2001. During construction, 120 contractual and over eight consultative companies worked on the dam. 5,000 workers constructed the dam with 40 dying in the process.

=== Dez Dam ===
At 203 metres tall, the Dez Dam is famous for producing electricity for irrigation of agricultural lands. It is located on the Dez River, 23 km from Andimshk city in Khuzestan province of Iran. The construction of this dam started in 1959 and was built in 1963 by an Italian company. This dam has a height of 203 meters with a capacity of 3,340,000,000 cubic meters.

== Geography ==
=== Location ===
Andimeshk sits close to the foothills of the Zagros Mountains on the main north–south highway from Tehran to Ahvaz, the provincial capital of Khuzestan. The main rail line from Tehran to the Persian Gulf is 15 km (9 mi) from Andimeshk. The Persian Gulf is at least 200 km south.

=== Climate ===
Andimeshk has a hot semi-arid climate (Köppen climate classification BSh) with extremely hot summers and mild winters. Rainfall is higher than most of southern Iran, but is almost exclusively confined to the period from November to April, though on occasions it can exceed 250 millimetres (9.8 in) per month or 600 millimetres (24 in) per year.

Climate data for Andimeshk
Month	Jan	Feb	Mar	Apr	May	Jun	Jul	Aug	Sep	Oct	Nov	Dec	Year
Record high °C (°F)	28.0 (82.4)	29.0 (84.2)	36.0 (96.8)	40.5 (104.9)	46.5 (115.7)	50.0 (122.0)	53.6 (128.5)	52.0 (125.6)	48.0 (118.4)	43.0 (109.4)	35.0 (95.0)	29.0 (84.2)	53.6 (128.5)
Mean daily maximum °C (°F)	17.2 (63.0)	19.6 (67.3)	24.1 (75.4)	30.0 (86.0)	37.5 (99.5)	43.7 (110.7)	46.0 (114.8)	44.9 (112.8)	41.7 (107.1)	34.8 (94.6)	26.2 (79.2)	19.3 (66.7)	32.1 (89.8)
Daily mean °C (°F)	10.8 (51.4)	13.2 (55.8)	17.3 (63.1)	22.8 (73.0)	29.9 (85.8)	35.1 (95.2)	37.0 (98.6)	35.8 (96.4)	32.0 (89.6)	25.6 (78.1)	17.9 (64.2)	12.5 (54.5)	24.2 (75.5)
Mean daily minimum °C (°F)	5.3 (41.5)	6.8 (44.2)	10.0 (50.0)	14.7 (58.5)	20.5 (68.9)	23.8 (74.8)	26.2 (79.2)	25.5 (77.9)	21.1 (70.0)	16.2 (61.2)	10.8 (51.4)	6.8 (44.2)	15.6 (60.2)
Record low °C (°F)	−9 (16)	−4.0 (24.8)	−2 (28)	3.0 (37.4)	10.0 (50.0)	16.0 (60.8)	19.0 (66.2)	16.5 (61.7)	10.0 (50.0)	6.0 (42.8)	1.0 (33.8)	−2 (28)	−9 (16)
Average rainfall mm (inches)	100.6 (3.96)	60.0 (2.36)	50.2 (1.98)	34.5 (1.36)	9.2 (0.36)	0.0 (0.0)	0.2 (0.01)	0.0 (0.0)	0.0 (0.0)	7.4 (0.29)	39.1 (1.54)	83.2 (3.28)	384.4 (15.14)
Average rainy days	9.9	8.1	8.1	6.5	3.0	0.0	0.1	0.0	0.0	2.1	6.2	8.0	52
Average relative humidity (%)	75	68	59	49	32	22	24	28	29	40	59	73	47
Mean monthly sunshine hours	131.6	158.4	192.3	217.7	272.5	325.6	322.7	317.0	291.3	234.8	158.2	121.9	2,744
Source: NOAA (1961-1990)

== Notable people ==
- Qadam Kheyr of Qalâvand, Luri woman warrior
- Saeid Abdevali, national wrestling athlete
- Habibollah Akhlaghi, national wrestling athlete
