= Dar Parusheh =

Village in Ilam, Iran

Dar Parusheh دارپروشه
- Village
- Location within Iran
- Coordinates: 33°42′36″N 47°05′27″E
- Country: Iran
- Province: Ilam
- County: Chardavol
- Bakhsh: Helilan
- Rural District: Helilan

Population (2006)
  - Total: 323
- Time zone: UTC+3:30 (IRST)
  - Summer (DST): UTC+4:30 (IRDT)

Dar Parusheh (Persian: دارپروشه, also Romanized as Dār Parūsheh and Dārparūsheh; also known as Dāl Parūsheh and Do Āb) is a village in Helilan Rural District, Helilan District, Chardavol County, Ilam Province, Iran. At the 2006 census, its population was 323, in 63 families. The village is populated by Kurds.
