= Shirin Ab, Izeh =

Shirin Ab شيرين اب
- Village
- Location within Iran
- Coordinates: 31°51′21″N 49°41′53″E
- Country: Iran
- Province: Khuzestan
- County: Izeh
- Bakhsh: Central
- Rural District: Holayjan

Population (2006)
  - Total: 81
- Time zone: UTC+3:30 (IRST)
  - Summer (DST): UTC+4:30 (IRDT)

Shirin Ab (Persian: شيرين اب, also Romanized as Shīrīn Āb) is a village in Holayjan Rural District, in the Central District of Izeh County, Khuzestan Province, Iran. At the 2011 census, its population was at 52, in 11 households.
