= Do Ab, Bamiyan =

Do Ab
- Location in Afghanistan
- Coordinates: 35°21′57″N 67°47′52″E
- Country: Afghanistan
- Province: Bamyan Province
- Elevation: 6,394 ft (1,949 m)

Population (2004)
  - Total: 2,381
- Time zone: + 4.30

Do Ab (also spelt Do Abe and Do ab-E Mikh-E Zarrin) is a village in Bamiyan Province in central Afghanistan. It is located in a pass in a mountainous region North East of Barmiyan town on the Ghandak highway 10 km from the border with Baghlan Province. It has a bazaar, a coal weigh station built in 2007 and a police check point. Do Abe is the centre of a coal mining industry that employed manual methods to extract coal from shafts in sacks. Coal seams visible on the surface are followed deep underground. The shaft roof is unsupported so accidents are common. From 2009/10 a contract was to be let to a Chinese coal mining group to extract the coal using mechanized equipment. Prior to the establishment of the weigh station coal smuggling across the border into Baghan province was rife. Kiwi 5 patrol of the New Zealand Provincial Reconstruction Team spent time in Do Abe in 2008 training the ANP in order to stop coal smuggling. This area is subject to attacks by roadside bombs. It was near Do Ab, close to the Ish Pesta ANP check point that a New Zealand soldier was later killed in a roadside bomb blast. After the IED exploded the 3 vehicles were attacked by RPGs and automatic gun fire. This led to a combined NZ/US attack on the Taliban group responsible that resulted in 13 terrorists being killed.

== Baghak Attack ==
In August 2012 2 New Zealand soldiers were killed at Do Abe by automatic gunfire and RPG. The NZ soldiers had been called to give assistance to the ANP who were attempting to arrest a known Taliban bomb maker. The force was attacked by a second group of between 12 and 17 Taliban who shot and wounded the NZ commander, an ex SAS soldier. One of the kiwi soldiers was killed while going to rescue his wounded commander. He was Lance Corporal Malone, the great-grandson of Lt Colonel William Malone, who was killed at the battle of Chunuk Bar, Gallipoli, Turkey, leading the New Zealand forces in 1915. The other, Lance Corporal Pralli Durrer, an LAV commander, was hit by small arms fire in the head. He was standing out of the turret, attempting to deal with an ammunition fire caused by insurgent activity at the time. 2 ANP soldiers were also killed and 4 wounded. One civilian was wounded. On Anzac day 2013, it was announced by Lt General Jones of the NZ Army, that following an investigation, it was found that 2 of the wounded had been hit by shell fragments fired from a New Zealand Forces LAV 25mm cannon that was supporting the infantry. The gunner was found not to be at fault as he was firing danger close to the troops in their support following normal military procedures. In the 12minute gun battle the bomb maker escaped but one Taliban insurgent was captured. The Taliban force was seen escaping back to Baghan province to the North East. As well as 2 KIA the kiwis suffered 6 wounded in the gun battle. The NZ soldiers were unable to follow the escaping insurgents as they do not have authority to manoeuvre in Baghan province which is under the military control of the Hungarian PRT. The following day the NZ army was given authority to manoeuvre in Baghan province and reinforcements were flown to Bamiyan. In previous counter insurgency operations into Baghan Province the force has mainly comprised NZ SAS and US special forces. The two New Zealand soldiers were buried with full military honours at a ceremony in Christchurch New Zealand.

== Valley Attack with IED ==
On 19 August 2012 a four Humvee Kiwi convoy was attacked with a 20 kg roadside bomb about 3 km west of the forward operating base at Do Abe. The convoy had picked up a sick soldier from the FOB and was returning to Romero Base. Three soldiers were killed by a bomb which Lt General Jones described as very large, probably a pressure plate or remote command wire bomb. The soldiers were Corporal Tamatea, Lance Corporal Jacinda Baker and Private Richard Harris. All of the soldiers were experienced. Female soldiers make up about 15% of each kiwi PRT team. Most serve as driver/medics. One of the early PRT rotations was commanded by a female officer. The bomb completely destroyed the last vehicle in the convoy. This western area is so rugged that Humvees are preferred as they can manoeuvre off-road better than LAVs. The valley where the attack occurred is very narrow and overlooked by steep, rock-covered mountain sides. Taliban insurgents fired down from near the top of the mountains. The New Zealand soldiers replied with automatic small arms fire and turret mounted 25mm cannon fire from the Humvees. In New Zealand General Jones said it was not a remotely exploded wireless bomb as the convoy was equipped with anti electronic pulsing equipment which disrupts wireless bomb control signals. The vehicle destroyed was an armoured Humvee. Kiwi soldiers patrol the road which goes to the capital Kabul at irregular periods. The Bamiyan ANP commander said that insurgents had been increasingly active on the highway in the last month, stopping people going to and from the capital. Recently five people associated with the government were taken at illegal check points and beheaded. General Jones said the NZ SAS would be sent into the Do Abe mountain area to gather intelligence. The New Zealand PRT team which is the 20th rotation, is scheduled for final withdrawal about April 2013. At the military funeral of the 3 soldiers in Christchurch, attended by the Prime Minister John Key, the officer wounded in the first August attack spoke about the soldiers and added that the same infantry unit were ready and able to reinforce the PRT team at any time if directed.

A Taliban spokesperson said that during the winter Bamiyan province had been infiltrated by a number of different groups who all had separate targets. He called for the New Zealand PRT team to leave Baniyan immediately. He claimed the Taliban would now target New Zealand soldiers. The Bamiyan provincial governor said the local forces are not well enough armed to fight the Taliban by themselves and called for heavier weapons. Radio New Zealand reported NZ Prime Minister John Key as saying that last week 4 New Zealand SAS intelligence officers had flown to Bamiyan to gather information to make a case for a counter insurgency operation by US special forces against insurgents responsible for recent attacks in the area. Afghan and Coalition counter insurgency forces in Afghanistan arrested three Taliban near Do Ab in an early morning helicopter raid on the village of Taleh bah Wafer, Baglan province, yesterday. One is described as a local third tier Taliban leader, connected with gun dealing. During the raid one Taliban insurgent was killed. The prime minister of New Zealand said no New Zealand troops took part in the raid. The Taliban leader is said to be behind the attack that killed two kiwi soldiers in August. Special forces are still hunting a known bomb maker in the same area. The Prime minister announced that a new New Zealand army company, plus forty disestablishment specialists, will go to Afghanistan shortly. They will be the last large unit of the New Zealand army sent to Afghanistan before the handover of security in Bamyan to local security forces in 2013. The new company will extend the range of patrols into Baglan province which formerly had been the exclusive manoeuvre zone of Hungarian coalition forces.

A Baglan-based Taliban warlord, Abdullah Kulta, who was responsible for planting the roadside bomb that killed the 3 kiwis soldiers on 19 August 2012, has been killed in an airstrike by coalition forces, acting on intelligence gathered by the New Zealand SAS, the New Zealand Prime Minister announced. The Taliban leader had been crossing the border to operate in Bamyan province. Kulta (also spelt Kalta) was also involved in the attack on NZ forces which resulted in the death of Corporal Malone

== See also ==
- Bamyan Province
