= Takab Rural District =

Takab Rural District (Persian: دهستان تكاب) may refer to:

- Takab Rural District (Kerman Province)
- Takab Rural District (Dargaz County), in Razavi Khorasan Province
- Takab Rural District (Kashmar County), in Razavi Khorasan Province
