= Boneh-ye Sorkhi =

Village in Khuzestan, Iran

Boneh-ye Sorkhi بنه سرخي
- Village
- Location within Iran
- Coordinates: 32°20′46″N 49°05′16″E
- Country: Iran
- Province: Khuzestan
- County: Lali
- Bakhsh: Central
- Rural District: Dasht-e Lali

Population (2006)
  - Total: 615
- Time zone: UTC+3:30 (IRST)
  - Summer (DST): UTC+4:30 (IRDT)

Boneh-ye Sorkhi (Persian: بنه سرخي, also Romanized as Boneh-ye Sorkhī; also known as Boneh-ye Sorkh and Shīrīn Āb) is a village in Dasht-e Lali Rural District, in the Central District of Lali County, Khuzestan Province, Iran. At the 2006 census, its population was 615, in 108 families.
