= Ab Shirin, Hormozgan =

Ab Shirin آب شيرين
- Village
- Location within Iran
- Coordinates: 27°38′08″N 56°12′13″E
- Country: Iran
- Province: Hormozgan
- County: Bandar Abbas
- Bakhsh: Fin
- Rural District: Gohreh

Population (2006)
  - Total: 35
- Time zone: UTC+3:30 (IRST)
  - Summer (DST): UTC+4:30 (IRDT)

Ab Shirin (Persian: آب شيرين, also Romanized as Āb Shīrīn) is a village in Gohreh Rural District, Fin District, Bandar Abbas County, Hormozgan province, Iran. At the 2006 census, its population was 35, in 11 families.
