= Do Ab, Markazi =

Do Ab دواب
- Village
- Location within Iran
- Coordinates: 33°38′12″N 49°15′41″E
- Country: Iran
- Province: Markazi
- County: Shazand
- Bakhsh: Sarband
- Rural District: Hendudar

Population (2006)
  - Total: 37
- Time zone: UTC+3:30 (IRST)
  - Summer (DST): UTC+4:30 (IRDT)

Do Ab (Persian: دواب, also Romanized as Do Āb, Dow Āb, and Dūāb) is a village in Hendudar Rural District, Sarband District, Shazand County, Markazi Province, Iran. At the 2006 census, its population was 37, in 12 families.
