= Doab-e Bilukher =

Doab-e Bilukher دواب بيلوخر
- Village
- Location within Iran
- Coordinates: 31°00′00″N 51°02′07″E
- Country: Iran
- Province: Kohgiluyeh and Boyer-Ahmad
- County: Boyer-Ahmad
- Bakhsh: Margown
- Rural District: Margown

Population (2006)
  - Total: 115
- Time zone: UTC+3:30 (IRST)
  - Summer (DST): UTC+4:30 (IRDT)

Doab-e Bilukher (Persian: دواب بيلوخر, also Romanized as Doāb Bīlūkher; also known as Doāb) is a village in Margown Rural District, Margown District, Boyer-Ahmad County, Kohgiluyeh and Boyer-Ahmad Province, Iran. At the 2006 census, its population was 115, in 21 families.
