= Ab Shirin, Sistan and Baluchestan =

Ab Shirin اب شيرين
- Village
- Location within Iran
- Coordinates: 27°50′53″N 59°19′03″E
- Country: Iran
- Province: Sistan and Baluchestan
- County: Dalgan
- Bakhsh: Central
- Rural District: Hudian

Population (2006)
  - Total: 46
- Time zone: UTC+3:30 (IRST)
  - Summer (DST): UTC+4:30 (IRDT)

Ab Shirin (Persian: اب شيرين, also Romanized as Āb Shīrīn) is a village in Hudian Rural District, in the Central District of Dalgan County, Sistan and Baluchestan province, Iran. At the 2006 census, its population was 46, in 13 families.
