= Shirin Ab, Andika =

Shirin Ab شيرين اب
- Village
- Location within Iran
- Coordinates: 32°06′13″N 49°29′57″E
- Country: Iran
- Province: Khuzestan
- County: Andika
- Bakhsh: Central
- Rural District: Shalal and Dasht-e Gol

Population (2006)
  - Total: 109
- Time zone: UTC+3:30 (IRST)
  - Summer (DST): UTC+4:30 (IRDT)

Shirin Ab (Persian: شيرين اب, also Romanized as Shīrīn Āb; also known as Shīrīn Āb-e Tang-e Shāh) is a village in Shalal and Dasht-e Gol Rural District, in the Central District of Andika County, Khuzestan Province, Iran. At the 2006 census, its population was 109, in 20 families.
