= Shirin Ab, Dezful =

Shirin Ab شيرين اب
- Village
- Location within Iran
- Coordinates: 32°24′02″N 48°34′43″E
- Country: Iran
- Province: Khuzestan
- County: Dezful
- Bakhsh: Sardasht
- Rural District: Mahur Berenji

Population (2016)
  - Total: 2,017
- Time zone: UTC+3:30 (IRST)
  - Summer (DST): UTC+4:30 (IRDT)

Shirin Ab (Persian: شيرين اب, also Romanized as Shīrīn Āb) is a village in Mahur Berenji Rural District, Sardasht District, Dezful County, Khuzestan Province, Iran. At the 2006 census, its population was 2017 in 398 families.
