= Doab, Sahneh =

Doab دواب
- Village
- Location within Iran
- Coordinates: 34°33′50″N 47°35′40″E
- Country: Iran
- Province: Kermanshah
- County: Sahneh
- Bakhsh: Central
- Rural District: Khodabandehlu

Population (2006)
  - Total: 53
- Time zone: UTC+3:30 (IRST)
  - Summer (DST): UTC+4:30 (IRDT)

Doab (Persian: دواب, also Romanized as Doāb and Dowāb) is a village in Khodabandehlu Rural District, in the Central District of Sahneh County, Kermanshah Province, Iran. At the 2006 census, its population was 53, in 14 families.
