= Chichali (archaeological site) =

Archaeological site in India

Coordinates: 22°08′N 75°22′E

Chichali is an archaeological site located on the left bank of the Narmada River in India, 7 km west of village Nimrani on the Mumbai Agra Highway. The site was discovered in 1996-1997 by the Prehistory Branch of the Archaeological Survey of India, during the course of exploration headed by Shri S.B. Ota.

== Anthropomorphic figurines ==
Chichali has produced twenty examples of anthropomorphic figurines, variously on pottery (12), in stone (3), ivory (4) and bone (1) from different levels of Early Historical Period. Two examples were found, having well marked head, torso and legs. These have parallels from comparable levels at Kaundinyapur, Amravati district, in Maharashtra.

== Excavation ==
Megaliths were constructed after depositing the funerary goods in the natural shallow depressions on the disintegrated bed - rock and covered with cairn heap and surrounded by big boulders. Materially the excavation yielded fragments of post-cremated human bones (skull fragments, long bones, ribs, etc), red ware, dull red ware and black and red ware ceramics. A notable feature of these megaliths is the total absence of iron objects.

== Chalcolithic settlements ==
Chichali is the historical origin of the Goswamis people who were known as Gosais and currently a single family of this ancient inhabitants currently reside in this area. The collections of the physical remains that were gathered by the archeologists who explored the area include the white painted black and red ware, thick incised red ware, red slipped ware, black furnished ware, black and red ware, dull red ware, grey ware and black on red ware.
