= Do Ab, Gilan =

Do Ab دواب
- Village
- Location within Iran
- Coordinates: 36°47′29″N 50°09′28″E
- Country: Iran
- Province: Gilan
- County: Rudsar
- Bakhsh: Rahimabad
- Rural District: Shuil

Population (2006)
  - Total: 13
- Time zone: UTC+3:30 (IRST)
  - Summer (DST): UTC+4:30 (IRDT)

Do Ab (Persian: دواب, also Romanized as Do Āb) is a village in Shuil Rural District, Rahimabad District, Rudsar County, Gilan Province, Iran. At the 2006 census, its population was 13, in 5 families.
