= Takab Bandan =

Takab Bandan تكاب بندان
- Village
- Location within Iran
- Coordinates: 31°47′34″N 49°57′18″E
- Country: Iran
- Province: Khuzestan
- County: Izeh
- Bakhsh: Central
- Rural District: Howmeh-ye Sharqi

Population (2006)
  - Total: 604
- Time zone: UTC+3:30 (IRST)
  - Summer (DST): UTC+4:30 (IRDT)

Takab Bandan (Persian: تكاب بندان, also Romanized as Takāb Bandān; also known as Tak Āb and Takāb) is a village in Howmeh-ye Sharqi Rural District, in the Central District of Izeh County, Khuzestan Province, Iran. At the 2006 census, its population was 604, in 101 families.
