= Do Ab-e Mikh-e Zarrin =

- Location in Afghanistan
- Coordinates: 35°15′52″N 67°59′35″E
- Country: Afghanistan
- Province: Baghlan Province
- Time zone: + 4.30

Do Ab-e Mikh-e Zarrin is a village in Baghlan Province in north eastern Afghanistan.

Do Ab-e-Mikh-e-Zarin is the commercial town in Kahmard district of Bamiyan province. Previously this was part of Baghlan province.

== See also ==
- Baghlan Province
