= Ab Shirin, Kohgiluyeh and Boyer-Ahmad =

Ab Shirin اب شيرين
- Village
- Location within Iran
- Coordinates: 30°16′02″N 50°46′17″E
- Country: Iran
- Province: Kohgiluyeh and Boyer-Ahmad
- County: Gachsaran
- Bakhsh: Central
- Rural District: Emamzadeh Jafar

Population (2006)
  - Total: 1,709
- Time zone: UTC+3:30 (IRST)
  - Summer (DST): UTC+4:30 (IRDT)

Ab Shirin (Persian: اب شيرين, also Romanized as Āb Shīrīn and Ābshīrīn) is a village in Emamzadeh Jafar Rural District, in the Central District of Gachsaran County, Kohgiluyeh and Boyer-Ahmad province, Iran. At the 2006 census, its population was 1,709, in 416 families.
