= Do Ab, Ravansar =

Do Ab دواب
- Village
- Location within Iran
- Coordinates: 34°32′12″N 46°46′55″E
- Country: Iran
- Province: Kermanshah
- County: Ravansar
- Bakhsh: Central
- Rural District: Hasanabad

Population (2006)
  - Total: 154
- Time zone: UTC+3:30 (IRST)
  - Summer (DST): UTC+4:30 (IRDT)

Do Ab (Persian: دواب, also Romanized as Do Āb, Dow Āb, and Dūāb) is a village in Hasanabad Rural District, in the Central District of Ravansar County, Kermanshah Province, Iran. At the 2006 census, its population was 154, in 38 families.
