= Shirin Ab, West Azerbaijan =

Shirin Ab شيرين اب
- Village
- Location within Iran
- Coordinates: 36°58′22″N 45°55′34″E
- Country: Iran
- Province: West Azerbaijan
- County: Miandoab
- Bakhsh: Central
- Rural District: Mokriyan-e Shomali

Population (2006)
  - Total: 395
- Time zone: UTC+3:30 (IRST)
  - Summer (DST): UTC+4:30 (IRDT)

Shirin Ab (Persian: شيرين اب, also Romanized as Shīrīn Āb) is a village in Mokriyan-e Shomali Rural District, in the Central District of Miandoab County, West Azerbaijan Province, Iran. At the 2006 census, its population was 395, in 86 families.
