= Dahan-e Valian =

- Location in Afghanistan
- Coordinates: 35°35′23″N 68°52′10″E
- Country: Afghanistan
- Province: Baghlan Province
- Time zone: + 4.30

Dahan-e Valian is a village in Baghlan Province in north eastern Afghanistan.

== See also ==
- Baghlan Province
