= Ab Shirin, Mamasani =

Ab Shirin ابشيرين
- Village
- Location within Iran
- Coordinates: 29°47′32″N 51°11′28″E
- Country: Iran
- Province: Fars
- County: Mamasani
- Bakhsh: Mahvarmilani
- Rural District: Mishan

Population (2006)
  - Total: 87
- Time zone: UTC+3:30 (IRST)
  - Summer (DST): UTC+4:30 (IRDT)

Ab Shirin (Persian: ابشيرين, also Romanized as Āb Shīrīn) is a village in Mishan Rural District, Mahvarmilani District, Mamasani County, Fars province, Iran. At the 2006 census, its population was 87, in 18 families.
