= Do Ab-e Valian =

- Location in Afghanistan
- Coordinates: 35°28′48″N 68°52′41″E
- Country: Afghanistan
- Province: Baghlan Province
- Time zone: + 4.30

Do Ab-e Valian is a village in Baghlan Province in north eastern Afghanistan.

== See also ==
- Baghlan Province
