= Howmeh Rural District (Andimeshk County) =

Rural district in Khuzestan province, Iran

Howmeh Rural District Persian: دهستان حومه
- Rural District
- Location within Iran
- Coordinates: 32°27′53″N 48°17′27″E
- Country: Iran
- Province: Khuzestan
- County: Andimeshk
- District: Central
- Capital: Azadi

Population (2016)
  - Total: 10,297
- Time zone: UTC+3:30 (IRST)

Howmeh Rural District (Persian: دهستان حومه) is in the Central District of Andimeshk County, Khuzestan province, Iran. It is administered from the city of Azadi. (Note: Formerly the village of Shahrak-e Babak)

== Demographics ==
=== Population ===
At the time of the 2006 National Census, the rural district's population was 15,494 in 3,181 households. There were 19,839 inhabitants in 4,559 households at the following census of 2011. The 2016 census measured the population of the rural district as 10,297 in 2,462 households. The most populous of its 119 villages was Shahrak-e Do Kuheh, with 2,922 people.
