= Central District (Andimeshk County) =

District in Khuzestan province, Iran

Central District (Andimeshk County) Persian: بخش مرکزی شهرستان اندیمشک
- District
- Location within Iran
- Coordinates: 32°27′53″N 48°17′27″E
- Country: Iran
- Province: Khuzestan
- County: Andimeshk
- Capital: Andimeshk

Population (2016)
  - Total: 155,816
- Time zone: UTC+3:30 (IRST)

The Central District of Andimeshk County (Persian: بخش مرکزی شهرستان اندیمشک) is in Khuzestan province, Iran. Its capital is the city of Andimeshk.

== History ==
After the 2011 National Census, the village of Shahrak-e Babak was elevated to city status as Azadi, and the village of Cham Golak was elevated to the status of a city as well.

== Demographics ==
=== Population ===
At the time of the 2006 census, the district's population was 134,916 in 29,321 households. The following census in 2011 counted 146,650 people in 37,463 households. The 2016 census measured the population of the district as 155,816 inhabitants in 44,435 households.

=== Administrative divisions ===
Central District (Andimeshk County) Population
Administrative Divisions	2006	2011	2016
Howmeh RD	15,494	19,839	10,297
Andimeshk (city)	119,422	126,811	135,116
Azadi (city) (Note: Formerly the village of Shahrak-e Babak)			4,957
Cham Golak (city)			5,446
Total	134,916	146,650	155,816
RD = Rural District
