= Hoseyniyeh Rural District =

Rural district in Khuzestan province, Iran

Hoseyniyeh Rural District Persian: دهستان حسينيه
- Rural District
- Location within Iran
- Coordinates: 32°40′26″N 48°10′57″E
- Country: Iran
- Province: Khuzestan
- County: Andimeshk
- District: Alvar-e Garmsiri
- Capital: Hoseyniyeh

Population (2016)
  - Total: 2,192
- Time zone: UTC+3:30 (IRST)

Hoseyniyeh Rural District (Persian: دهستان حسينيه) is in Alvar-e Garmsiri District of Andimeshk County, Khuzestan province, Iran. It is administered from the city of Hoseyniyeh.

== Demographics ==
=== Population ===
At the time of the 2006 National Census, the rural district's population was 5,120 in 1,040 households. There were 5,129 inhabitants in 1,266 households at the following census of 2011. The 2016 census measured the population of the rural district as 2,192 in 593 households. The most populous of its 87 villages was Golkhaneh, with 370 people.
