= Qilab Rural District =

Rural district in Khuzestan province, Iran

Qilab Rural District Persian: دهستان قيلاب
- Rural District
- Location within Iran
- Coordinates: 32°52′08″N 48°18′36″E
- Country: Iran
- Province: Khuzestan
- County: Andimeshk
- District: Alvar-e Garmsiri
- Capital: Sorkhakan

Population (2016)
  - Total: 5,375
- Time zone: UTC+3:30 (IRST)

Qilab Rural District (Persian: دهستان قيلاب) is in Alvar-e Garmsiri District of Andimeshk County, Khuzestan province, Iran. Its capital is the village of Sorkhakan.

== Demographics ==
=== Population ===
At the time of the 2006 National Census, the rural district's population was 8,065 in 1,527 households. There were 6,671 inhabitants in 1,518 households at the following census of 2011. The 2016 census measured the population of the rural district as 5,375 in 1,412 households. The most populous of its 124 villages was Jurvand, with 604 people.
