= Mazu Rural District =

Rural district in Khuzestan province, Iran

Mazu Rural District Persian: دهستان مازو
- Rural District
- Location within Iran
- Coordinates: 32°49′59″N 48°35′59″E
- Country: Iran
- Province: Khuzestan
- County: Andimeshk
- District: Alvar-e Garmsiri
- Capital: Mazu

Population (2016)
  - Total: 3,019
- Time zone: UTC+3:30 (IRST)

Mazu Rural District (Persian: دهستان مازو) is in Alvar-e Garmsiri District of Andimeshk County, Khuzestan province, Iran. Its capital is the village of Mazu.

== Demographics ==
=== Population ===
At the time of the 2006 National Census, the rural district's population was 4,117 in 866 households. There were 3,346 inhabitants in 800 households at the following census of 2011. The 2016 census measured the population of the rural district as 3,019 in 807 households. The most populous of its 72 villages was Mazu, with 416 people.
