= Alvar-e Garmsiri District =

District in Khuzestan province, Iran

Alvar-e Garmsiri District Persian: بخش الوار گرمسیری
- District
- Location within Iran
- Coordinates: 32°44′52″N 48°20′44″E
- Country: Iran
- Province: Khuzestan
- County: Andimeshk
- Capital: Hoseyniyeh

Population (2016)
  - Total: 14,793
- Time zone: UTC+3:30 (IRST)

Alvar-e Garmsiri District (Persian: بخش الوار گرمسیری) is in Andimeshk County, Khuzestan province, Iran. Its capital is the city of Hoseyniyeh.

== History ==
After the 2011 National Census, the village of Bidrubeh merged with several villages to become a city.

== Demographics ==
=== Population ===
At the time of the 2006 census, the district's population was 19,165 in 3,838 households. The following census in 2011 counted 17,109 people in 4,090 households. The 2016 census measured the population of the district as 14,793 inhabitants in 3,978 households.

Alvar-e Garmsiri District Population
Administrative Divisions	2006	2011	2016
Hoseyniyeh RD	5,120	5,129	2,192
Mazu RD	4,117	3,346	3,019
Qilab RD	8,065	6,671	5,375
Bidrubeh (city)			2,386
Hoseyniyeh (city)	1,863	1,963	1,821
Total	19,165	17,109	14,793
RD = Rural District
