= Andimeshk County =

County in Khuzestan province, Iran

Andimeshk County Persian: شهرستان اندیمشک
- County
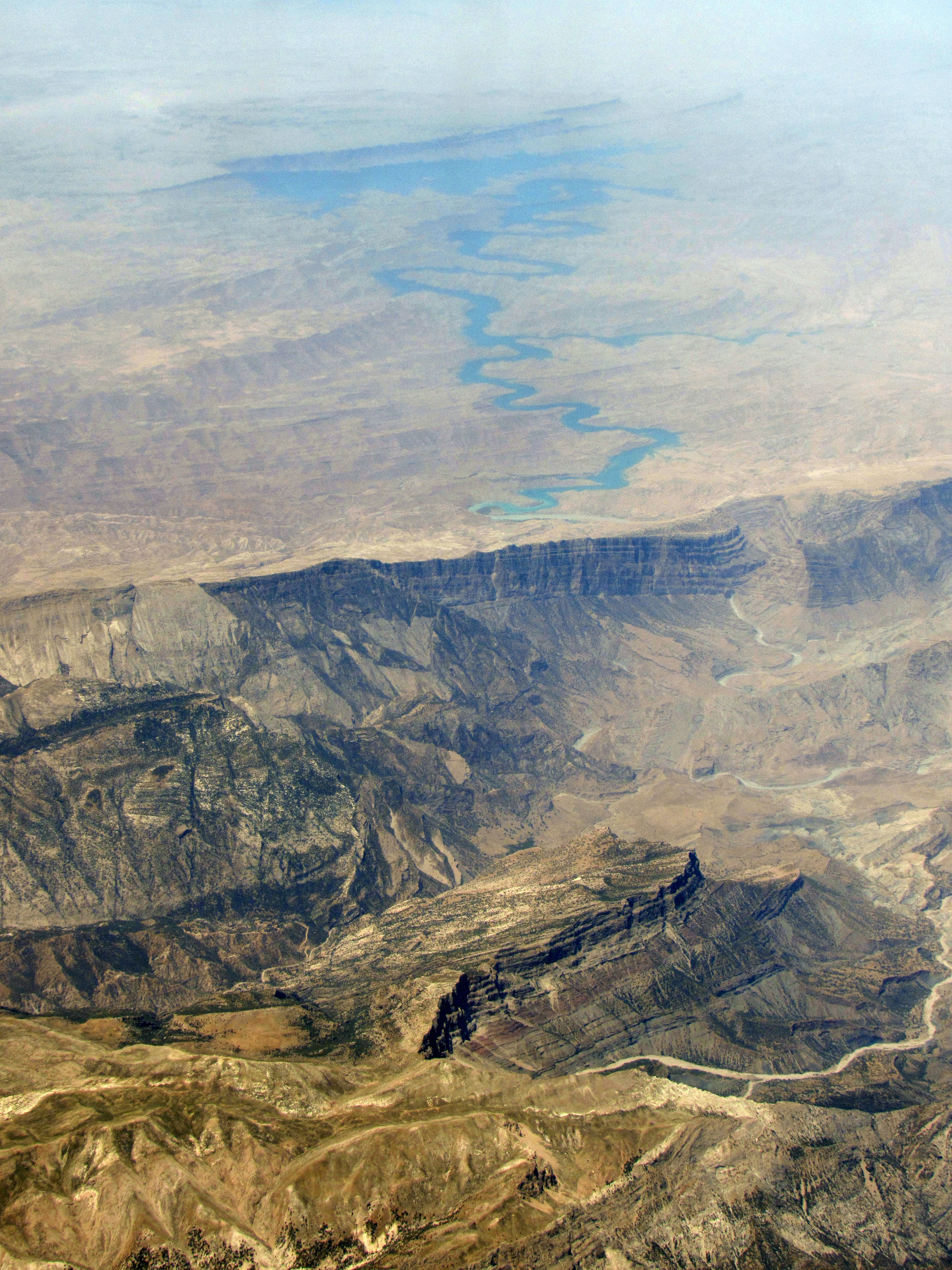
- Dez Reservoir

- Location of Andimeshk County in Khuzestan province (top left, green)

- Location of Khuzestan province in Iran
- Coordinates: 32°42′N 48°23′E
- Country: Iran
- Province: Khuzestan
- Capital: Andimeshk
- Districts: Central, Alvar-e Garmsiri

Population (2016)
  - Total: 171,412
- Time zone: UTC+3:30 (IRST)

Andimeshk County (Persian: شهرستان اندیمشک) (Note: Also romanized as Shahrestan-e Andimeshk) is in Khuzestan province, Iran. Its capital is the city of Andimeshk.

== History ==
After the 2011 National Census, the village of Shahrak-e Babak was elevated to city status as Azadi; the village of Bidrubeh merged with several villages to become a city; and the village of Cham Golak rose to city status as well.

== Demographics ==
=== Population ===
At the time of the 2006 census, the county's population was 154,081 in 33,159 households. The following census in 2011 counted 167,126 people in 42,284 households. The 2016 census measured the population of the county as 171,412 in 48,636 households.

=== Administrative divisions ===
Andimeshk County's population history and administrative structure over three consecutive censuses are shown in the following table.

Andimeshk County Population
Administrative Divisions	2006	2011	2016
Central District	134,916	146,650	155,816
Howmeh RD	15,494	19,839	10,297
Andimeshk (city)	119,422	126,811	135,116
Azadi (city) (Note: Formerly the village of Shahrak-e Babak)			4,957
Cham Golak (city)			5,446
Alvar-e Garmsiri District	19,165	17,109	14,793
Hoseyniyeh RD	5,120	5,129	2,192
Mazu RD	4,117	3,346	3,019
Qilab RD	8,065	6,671	5,375
Bidrubeh (city)			2,386
Hoseyniyeh (city)	1,863	1,963	1,821
Total	154,081	167,126	171,412
RD = Rural District

== See also ==
Media related to Andimeshk County at Wikimedia Commons
