= Mercator 1569 world map =

First map in Mercator's projection

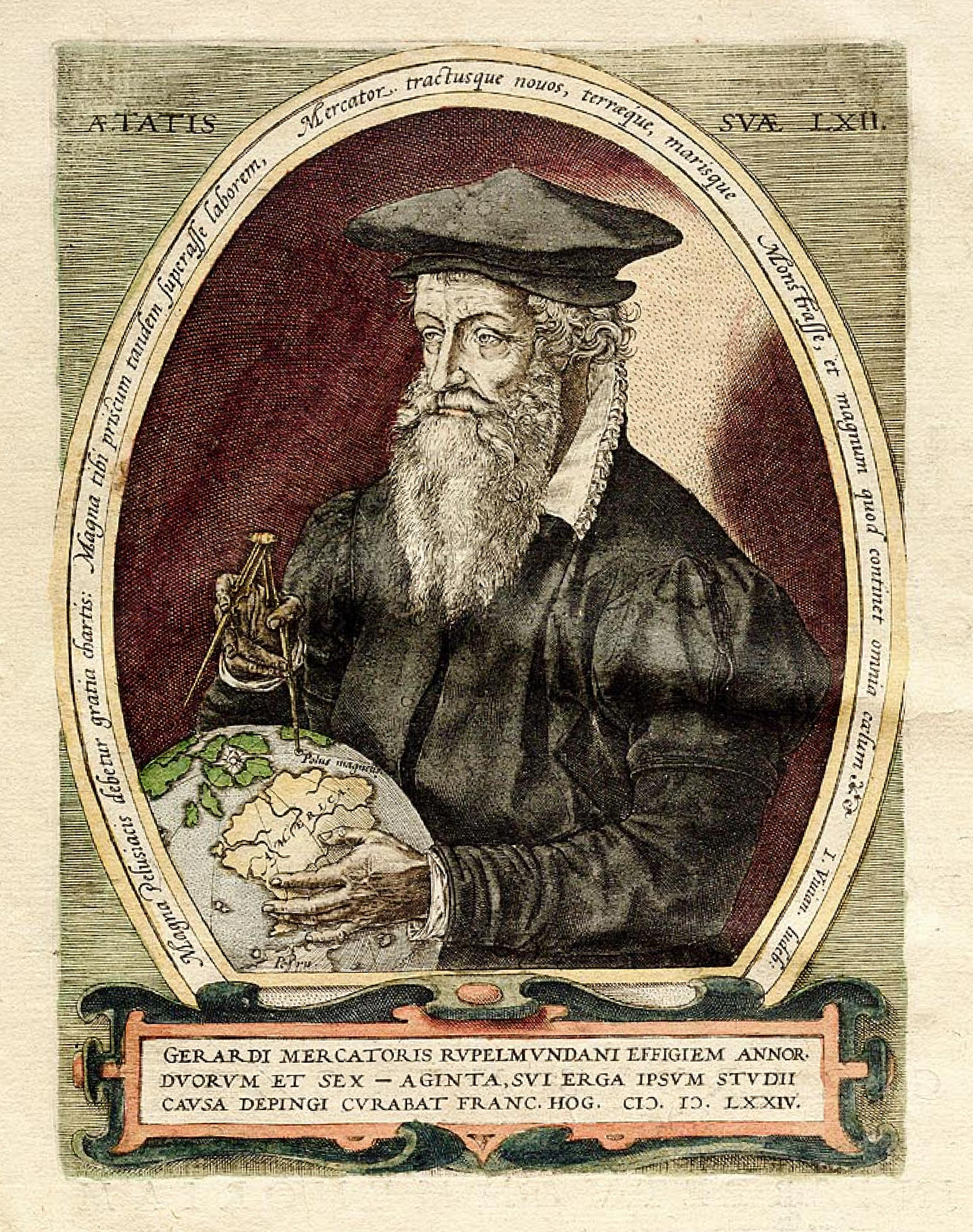
Gerardus Mercator 1512–1594

The Mercator world map of 1569 is titled Nova et Aucta Orbis Terrae Descriptio ad Usum Navigantium Emendate Accommodata (Renaissance Latin for "New and more complete representation of the terrestrial globe properly adapted for use in navigation"). The title shows that Gerardus Mercator aimed to present contemporary knowledge of the geography of the world and at the same time 'correct' the chart to be more useful to sailors. This 'correction', whereby constant bearing sailing courses on the sphere (rhumb lines) are mapped to straight lines on the plane map, characterizes the Mercator projection. While the map's geography has been superseded by modern knowledge, its projection proved to be one of the most significant advances in the history of cartography, inspiring the 19th century map historian Adolf Nordenskiöld to write "The master of Rupelmonde stands unsurpassed in the history of cartography since the time of Ptolemy." The projection heralded a new era in the evolution of navigation maps and charts and it is still their basis.

The 1569 Mercator map of the world.

The map is inscribed with a great deal of text. The framed map legends (or cartouches) cover a wide variety of topics: a dedication to his patron and a copyright statement; discussions of rhumb lines; great circles and distances; comments on some of the major rivers; accounts of fictitious geography of the north pole and the southern continent. The full Latin texts and English translations of all the legends are given below. Other minor texts are sprinkled about the map. They cover such topics as the magnetic poles, the prime meridian, navigational features, minor geographical details, the voyages of discovery and myths of giants and cannibals. These minor texts are also given below.

A comparison with world maps before 1569 shows how closely Mercator drew on the work of other cartographers and his own previous works, but he declares (Legend 3) that he was also greatly indebted to many new charts prepared by Portuguese and Spanish sailors in the portolan tradition. Earlier cartographers of world maps had largely ignored the more accurate practical charts of sailors, and vice versa, but the age of discovery, from the closing decade of the fifteenth century, stimulated the integration of these two mapping traditions: Mercator's world map is one of the earliest fruits of this merger.

== Extant copies and facsimiles ==
Mercator's 1569 map was a large planisphere, i.e. a projection of the spherical Earth onto the plane. It was printed in eighteen separate sheets from copper plates engraved by Mercator himself. Each sheet measures 33×40 cm and, with a border of 2 cm, the complete map measures 202×124 cm. All sheets span a longitude of 60 degrees; the first row of 6 sheets cover latitudes 80°N to 56°N, the second row cover 56°N to 16°S and the third row cover 16°S to 66°S: this latitude division is not symmetric with respect to the equator thus giving rise to the later criticism of a Euro-centric projection.

It is not known how many copies of the map were printed, but it was certainly several hundred. Despite this large print run, by the middle of the nineteenth century there was only one known copy, that at the Bibliothèque Nationale de France. A second copy was discovered in 1889 at the Stadt Bibliothek of Breslau along with maps of Europe and Britain. These three maps were destroyed by fire in 1945 but fortunately copies had been made before then. A third copy was found in a map collection Mappae Geographiae vetustae from the archives of the Amerbach family which had been given to the library of the University of Basel. The only other complete copy was discovered at an auction sale in Luzern in 1932 and is now in the map collection of the Maritiem Museum Rotterdam. In addition to the complete copies there is a single page showing the North Atlantic in the Mercator atlas of Europe in the British Library. Many paper reproductions of all four maps have been made. Those at full scale, providing access to the detail and the artistry of Mercator's engraving, are listed next. Images of the Basil, Paris, and Rotterdam impressions can be found online.

=== Basel map ===
The Basel map is the cleanest of the three extant versions. It is called the 'three strip' version because it is in three separate rows rather than a single assembled sheet. It was photographically reproduced at a reduced scale by Wilhelm Kruecken in 1992; more recently (2011) he has produced a full-scale and full sized (202×124 cm) reproduction of the map along with a five volume account (in German) covering all aspects of Mercator's work. Medium resolution scans of the separate sheets and a composite of all 18 scans are accessible as follows.

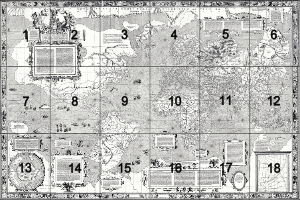

Links to the
individual sheets:

| 1 | 2 | 3 | 4 | 5 | 6 |
| 7 | 8 | 9 | 10 | 11 | 12 |
| 13 | 14 | 15 | 16 | 17 | 18 |

Composite image
of all 18 sheets
as a 20 MB file

=== Paris map ===
The Paris copy is a single combined sheet that came into the possession of the Bibliothèque Nationale from the estate of Julius Klaproth (1783–1835). The map is uncoloured, partially borderless and in poor condition due to repeated exhibitions during the nineteenth century. It was reproduced by Edmé-François Jomard (1777–1862) between 1842 and 1862 as part of a collection of 21 facsimile maps. Very few copies of this facsimile are known.

The Bibliothèque Nationale has put a digital image of their copy into the public domain in the form of 13 separate images. The images do not correspond exactly with the 18 original sheets: they are in three rows of different heights with 5, 4, 4 images respectively. The zoomable images permit examination of small sections of the map in very great detail. These are the only online images at a high enough resolution to read the smallest text.

=== Breslau map ===
Immediately after its discovery in 1889 the Breslau map was described by Heyer who initiated copies (in multiple sheets) for the Berlin Geographical Society in 1891. Forty years later, in 1931, a further 150 copies were issued by the Hydrographic Bureau

=== Rotterdam map ===
This copy in the Maritiem Museum Rotterdam is in the form of an atlas constructed by Mercator for his friend and patron Werner von Gymnich. It was made by Mercator in (or shortly after) 1569 by dissecting and reassembling three copies of his original wall map to create coherent units such as continents or oceans or groups of legends. There are 17 non-blank coloured pages which may be viewed online (and zoomed to a medium resolution, much lower than that of the French copy at the Bibliothèque Nationale).

In 1962 a monochrome facsimile of this atlas was produced jointly by the curators of the Rotterdam museum and the cartographic journal Imago Mundi. The plates are accompanied with comprehensive bibliographic material, a commentary by van 't Hoff and English translations of the Latin text from the Hydrographics Review. More recently, in 2012, the Maritiem Museum Rotterdam produced a facsimile edition of the atlas, with an introduction by Sjoerd de Meer.

== World and regional maps before 1569 ==
Some world maps of the Renaissance up to 1569 — various projections
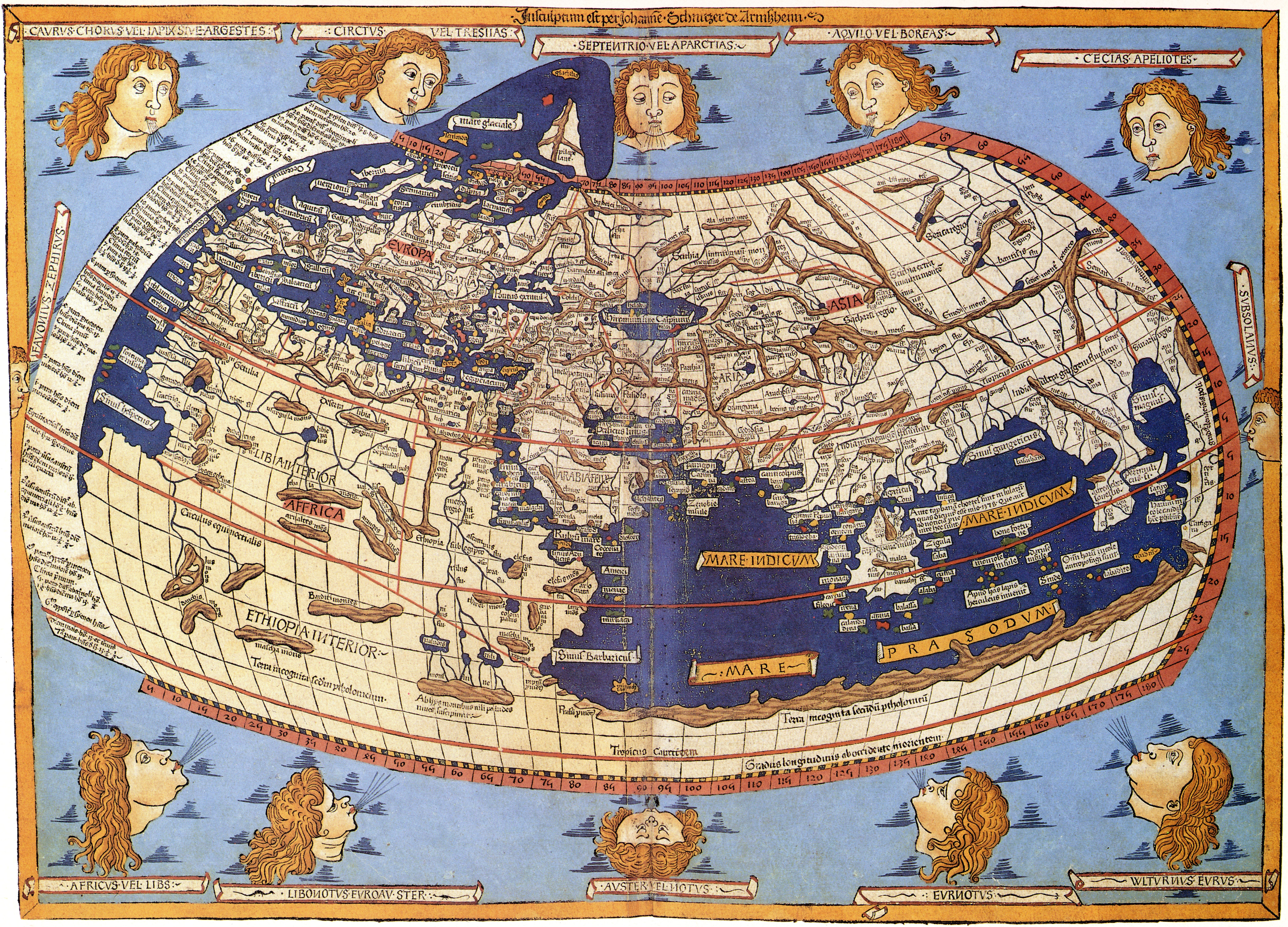
Claudius Ptolemy 1482

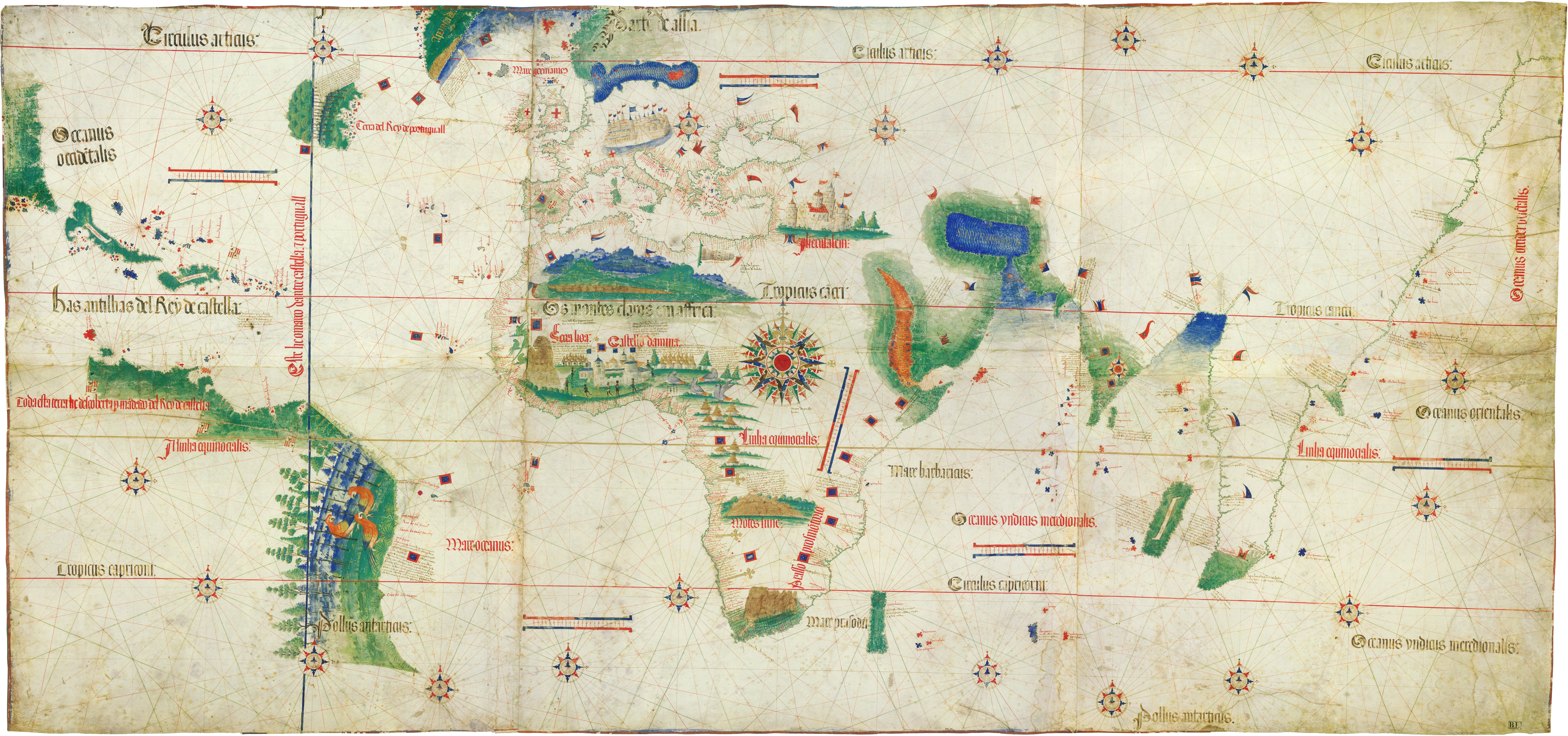
Cantino c. 1502 (Padrão Real)

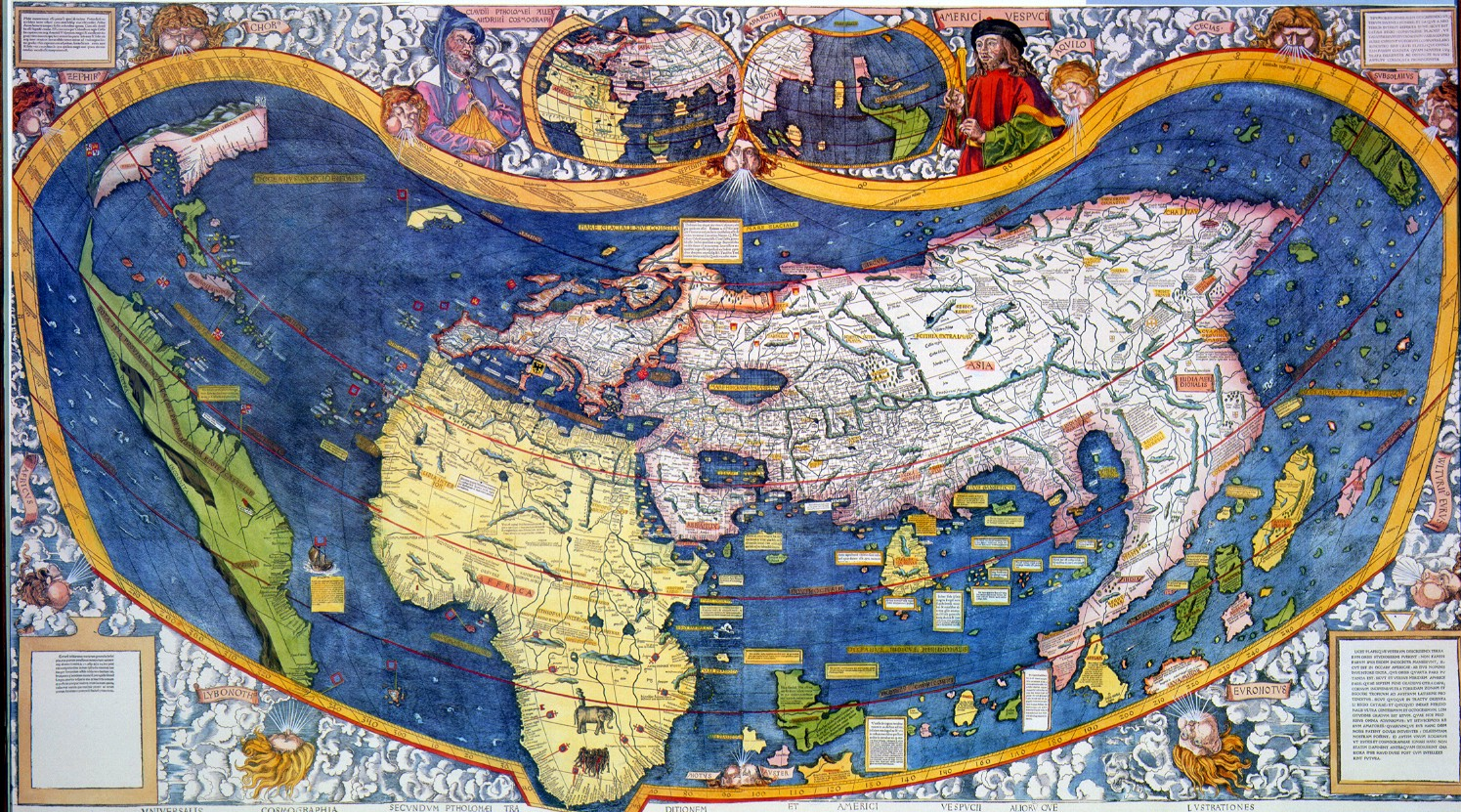
Waldseemüller 1508

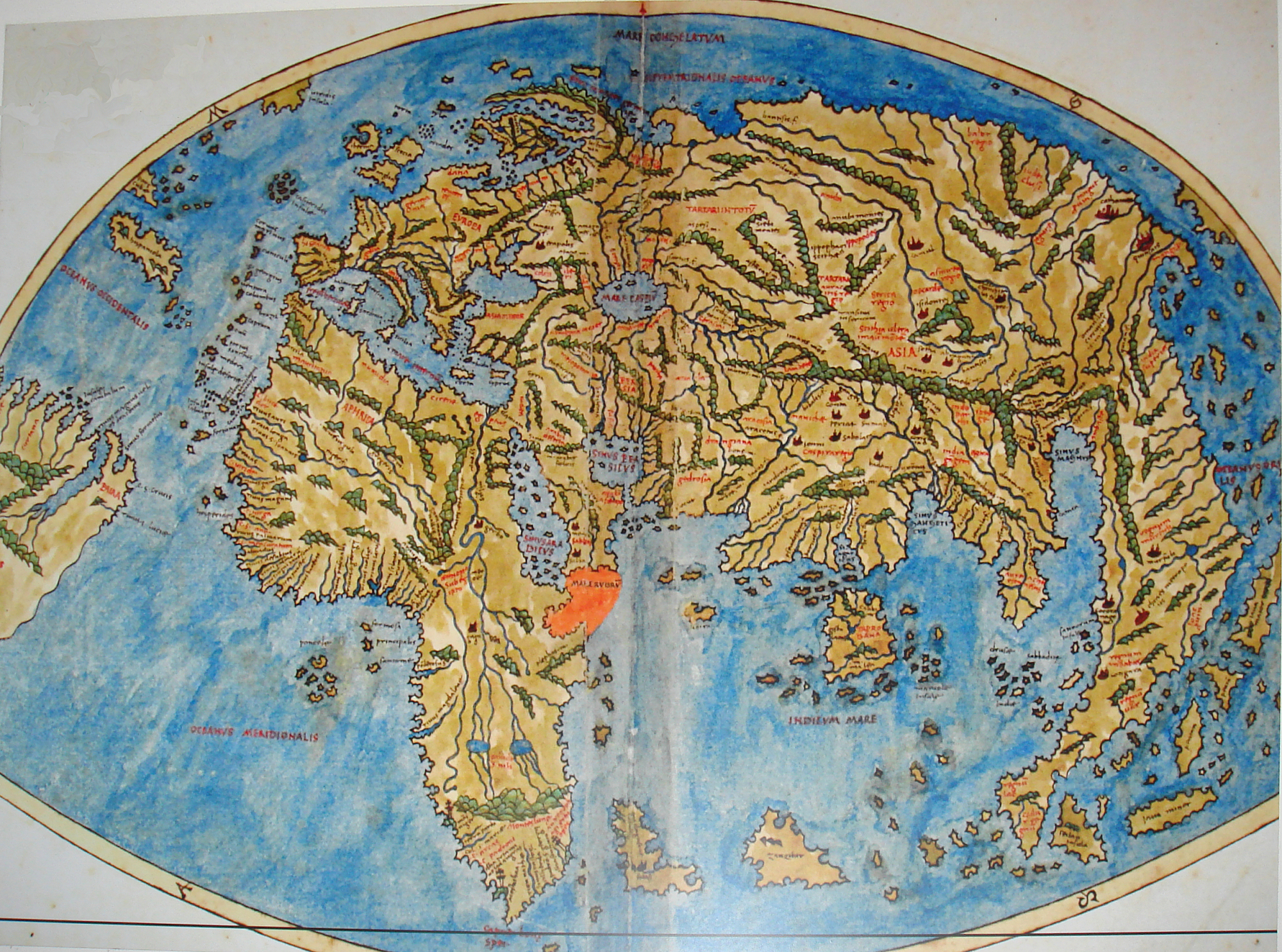
Pietro Coppo 1520

D. Ribeiro 1529 (Padrón Real)

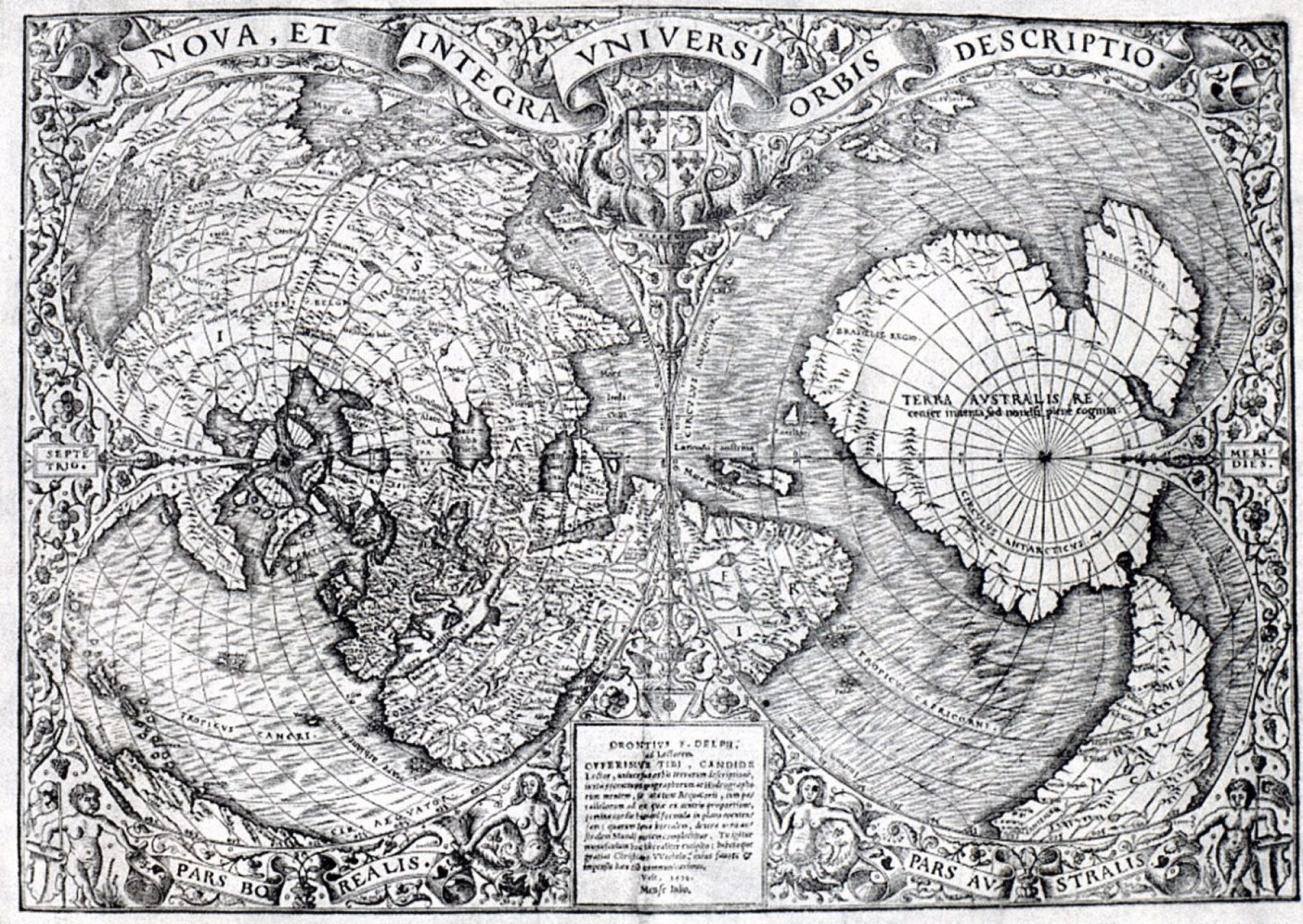
Oronce Fine 1531

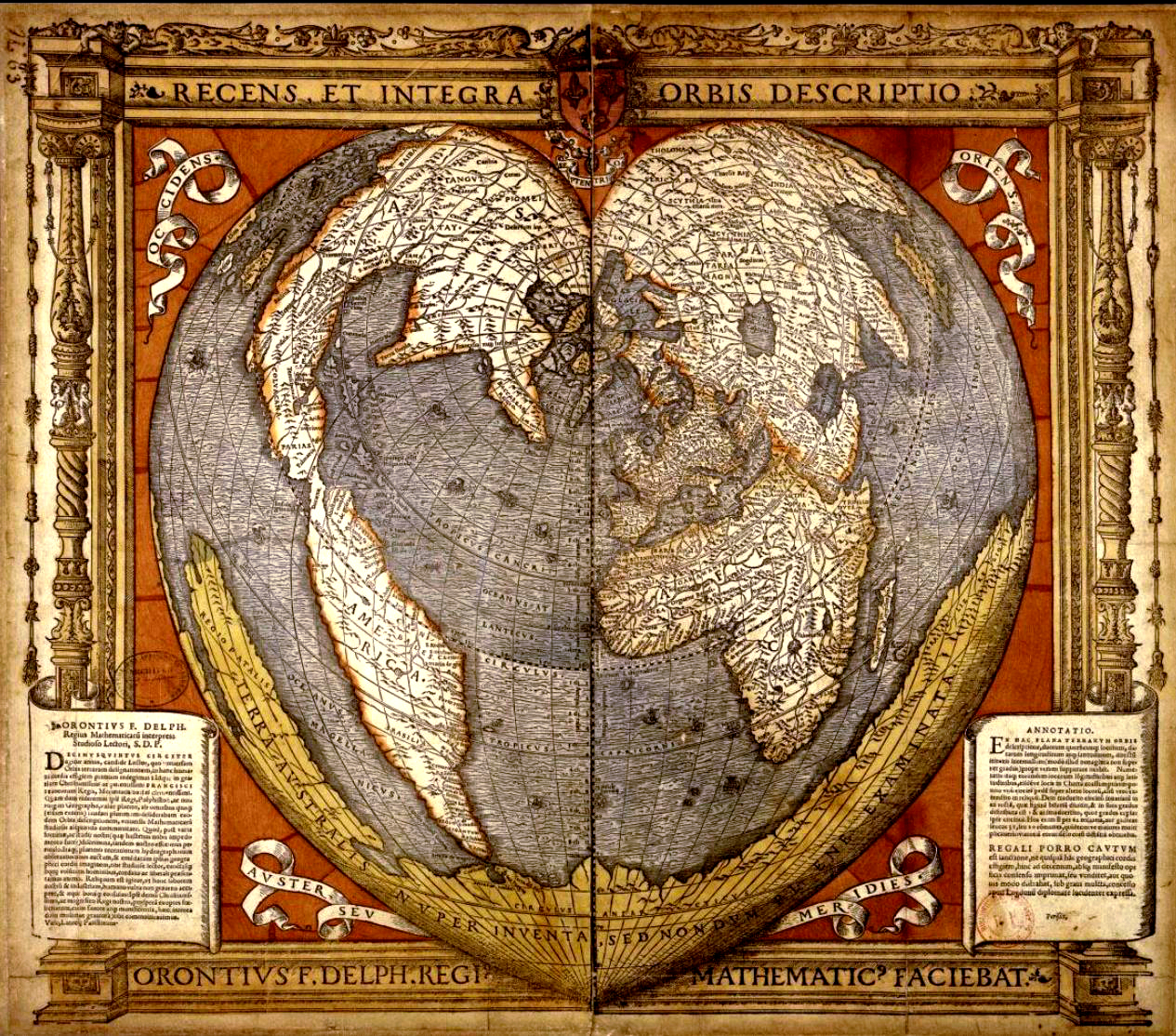
Oronce Fine 1536

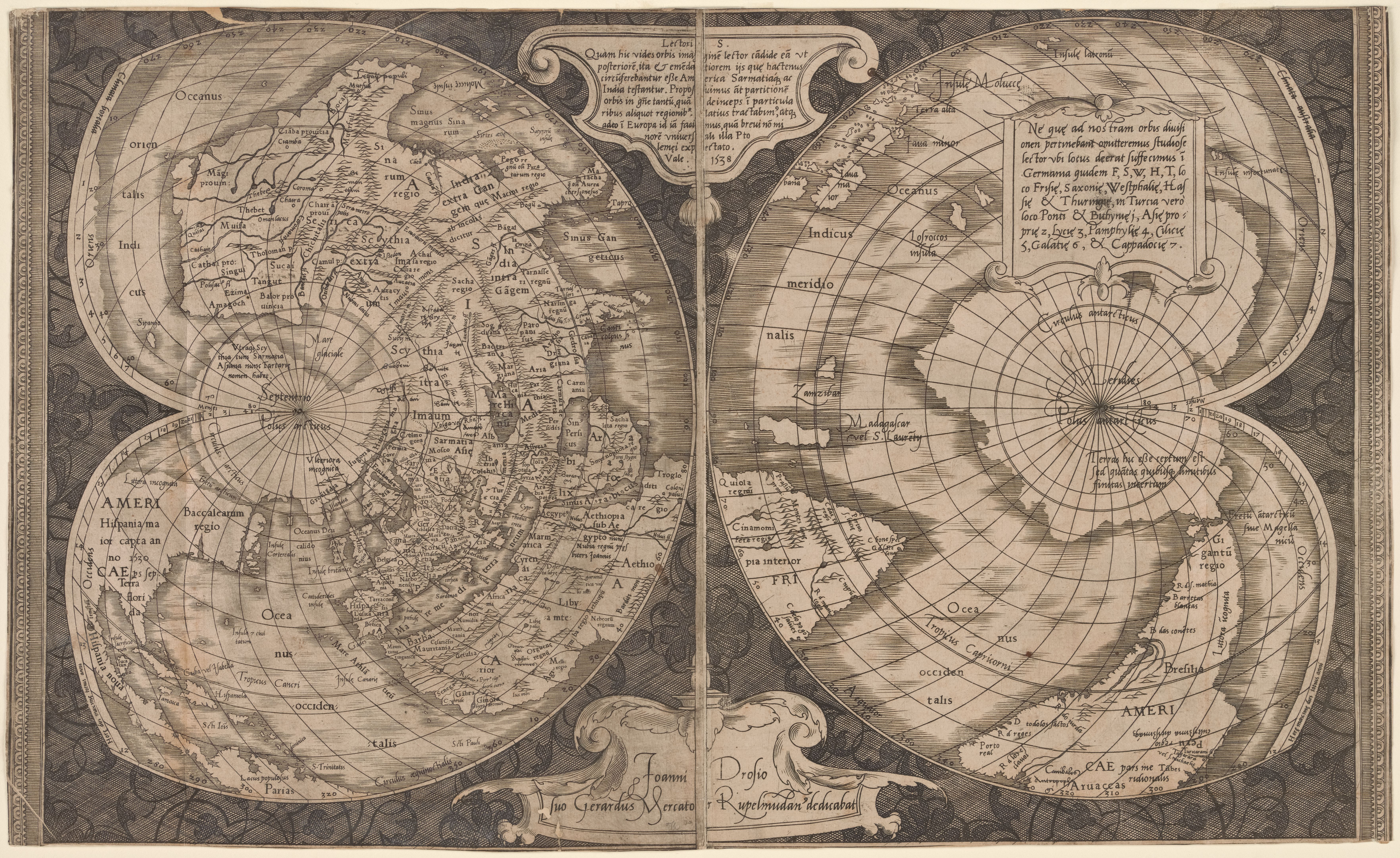
Mercator 1538

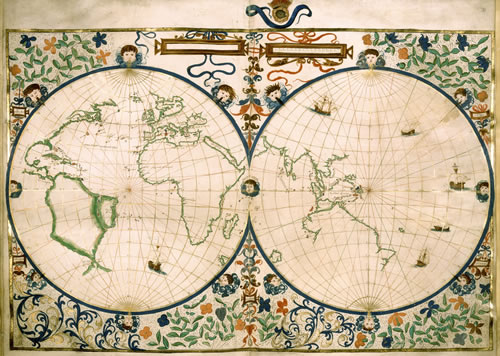
Jean Rotz 1542

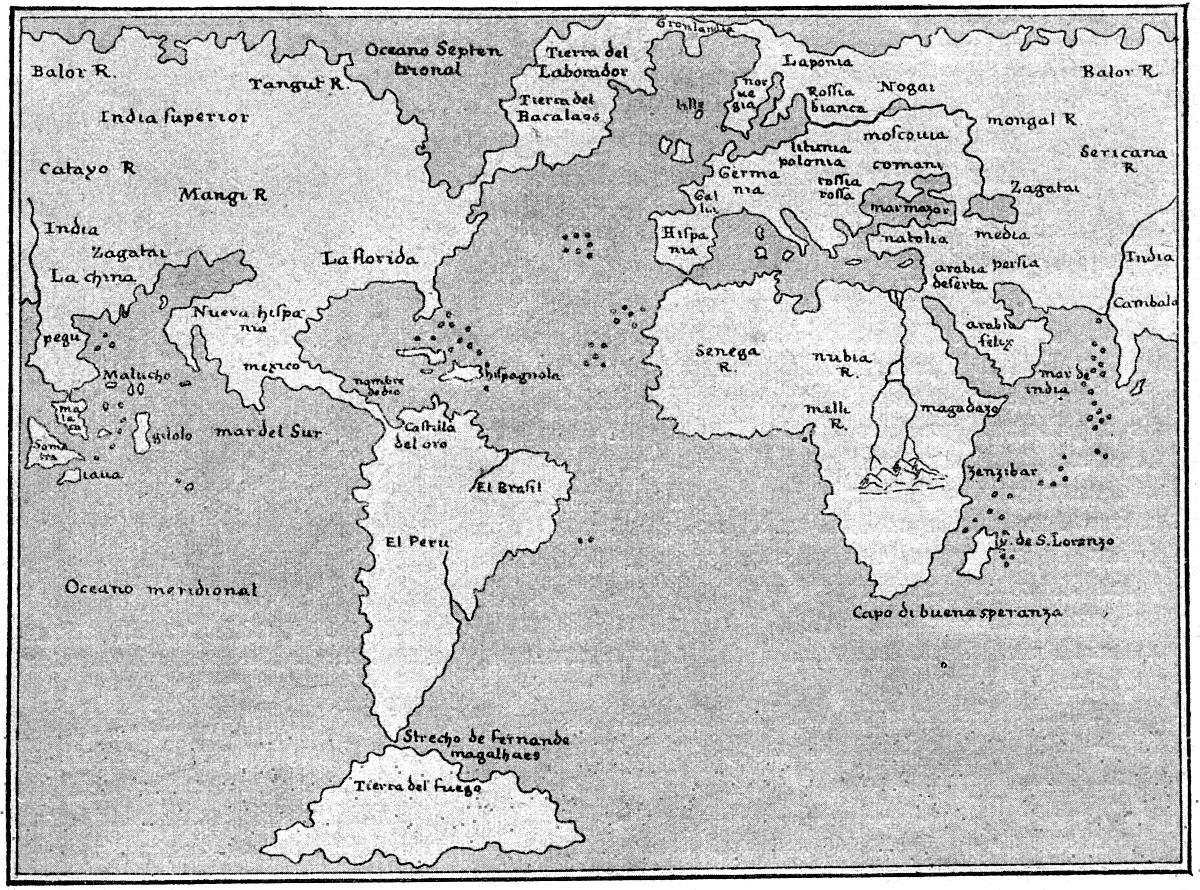
Giacomo Gastaldi 1548

Ortelius 1570
Some regional maps before 1569
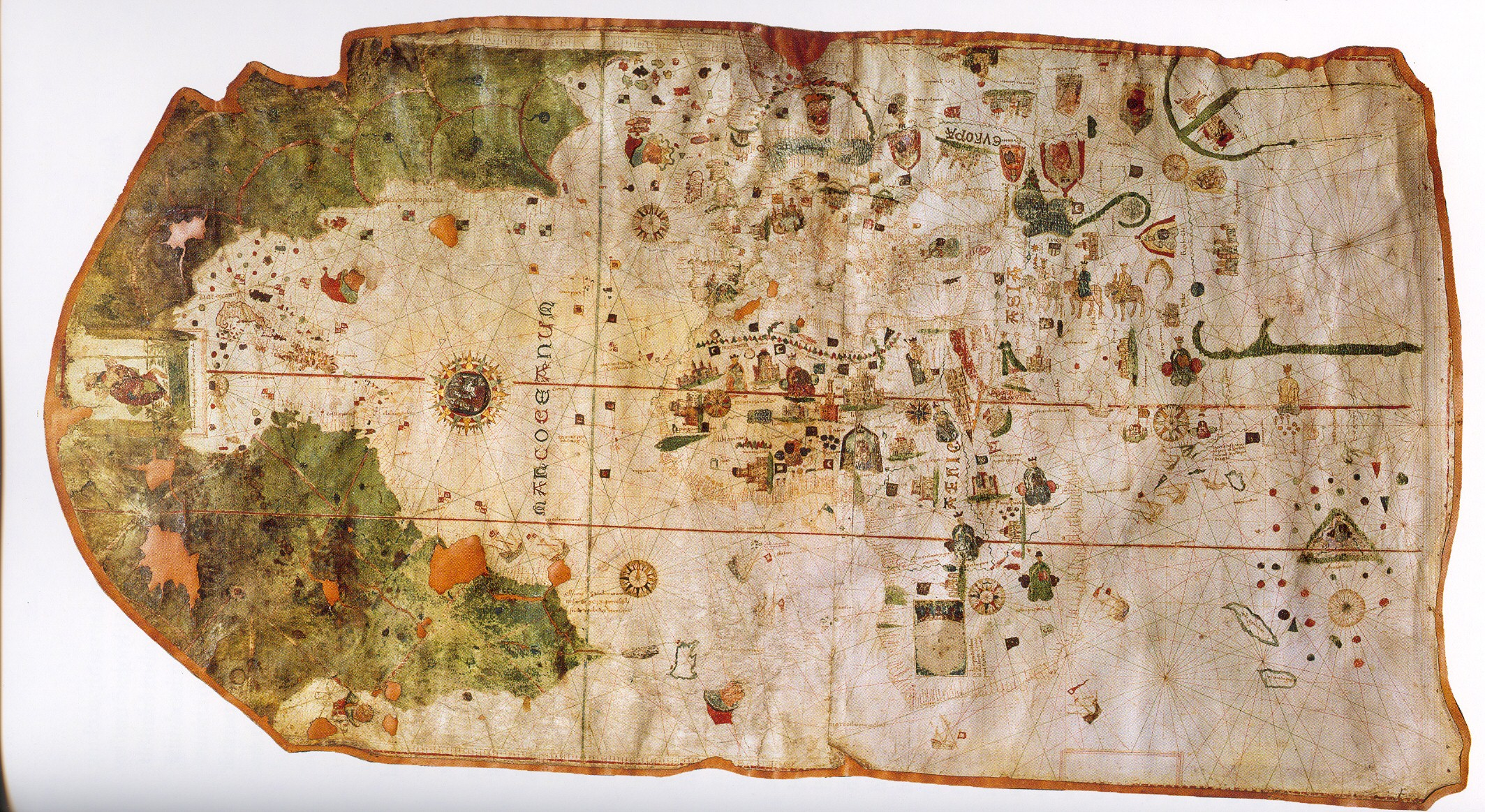
1500 Juan de la Cosa

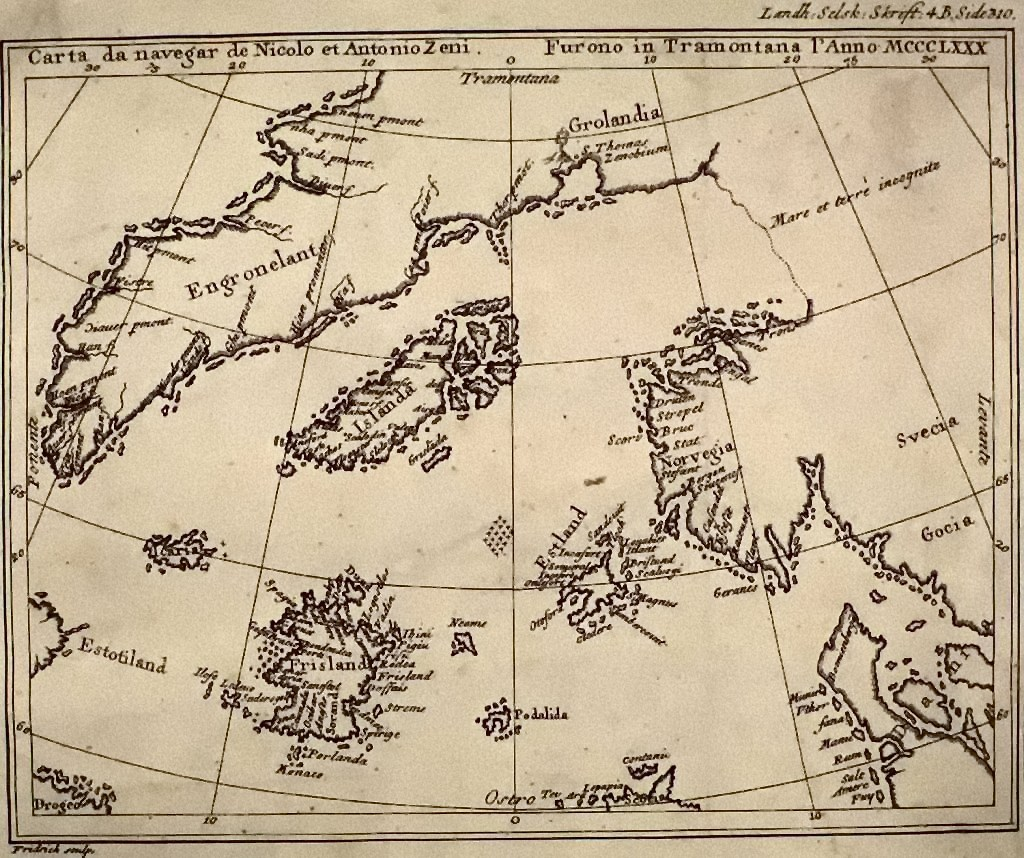
The Zeno map 1558

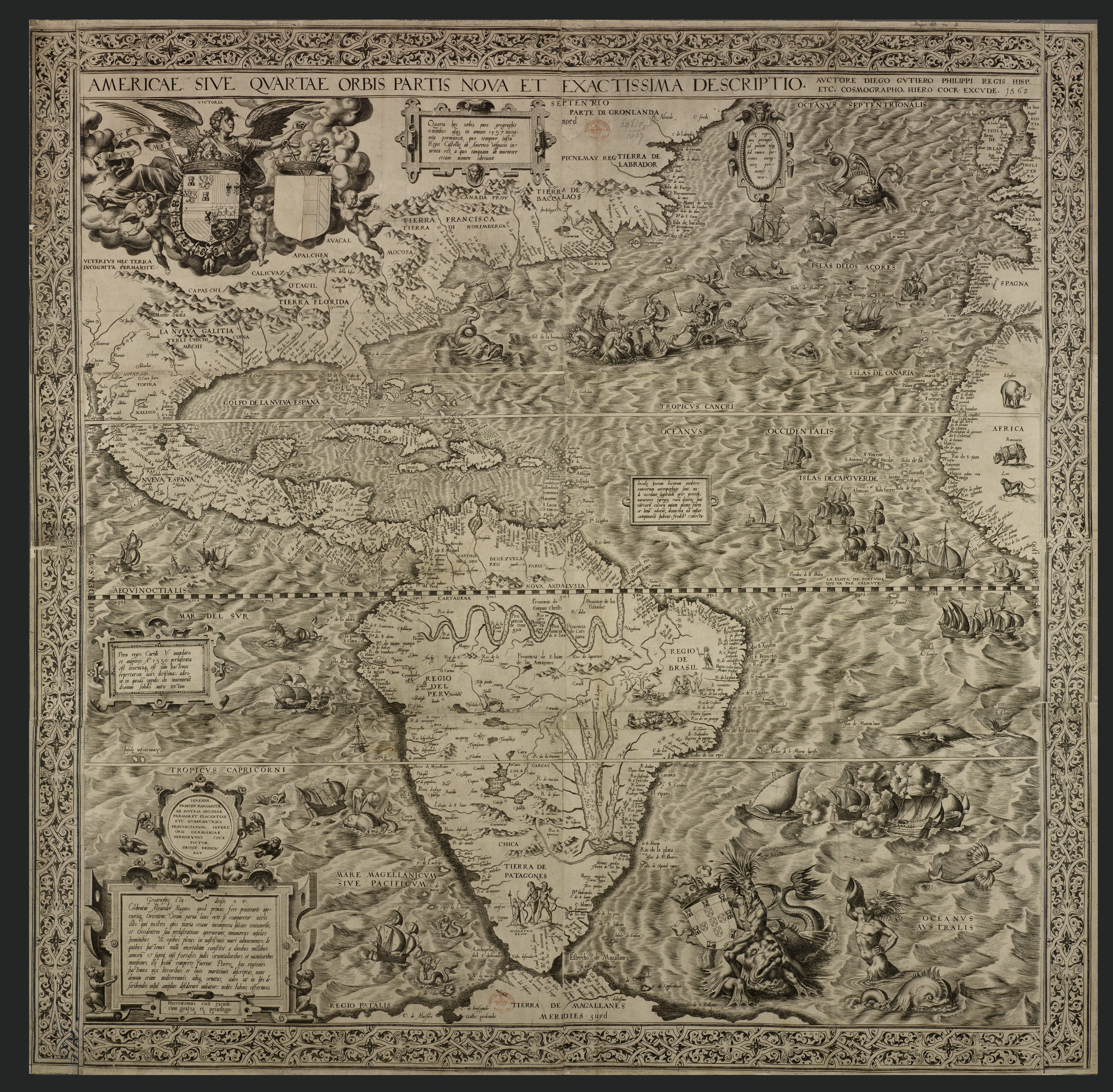
Gutiérrez 1562

== Principal features of the 1569 Mercator map ==
=== Mercator's projection ===
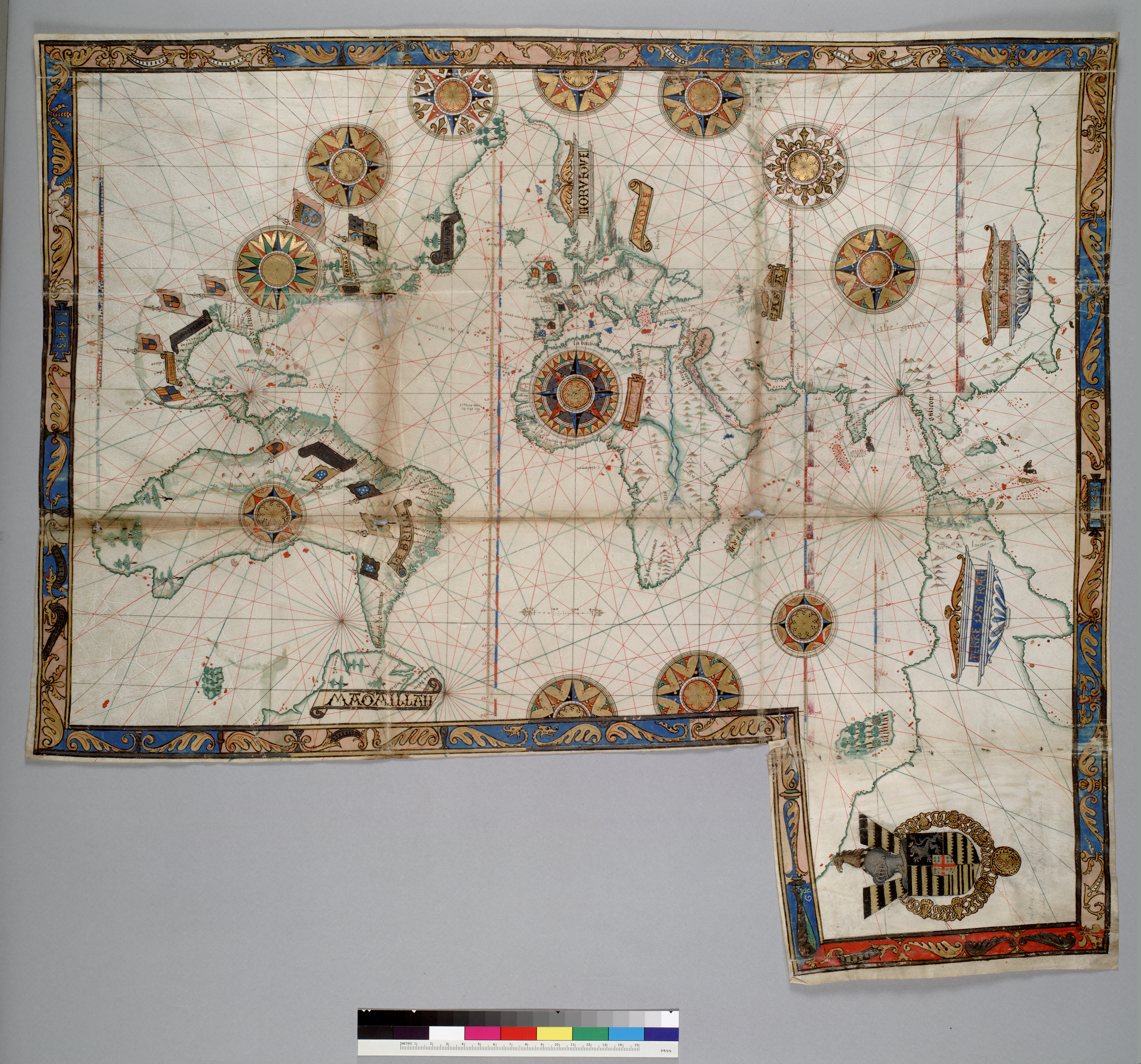
A sea chart of the Dieppe school with parallel meridians and uniformly spaced orthogonal parallels. c. 1543

In Legend 3 Mercator states that his first priority is "to spread on a plane the surface of the sphere in such a way that the positions of places shall correspond on all sides with each other, both in so far as true direction and distance are concerned and as correct longitudes and latitudes". He goes on to point out the deficiencies of previous projections, particularly the distortion caused by the oblique incidence of parallels and meridians which gives rise to incorrect angles and shapes: therefore he adopts parallel meridians and orthogonal parallels. This is also a feature of sixteenth-century plane charts (equirectangular projections) but they also have equally spaced parallels; in Legend 3 Mercator also emphasizes the distortion that this gives rise to. In particular, the straight lines emanating from the compass roses are not rhumb lines so that they do not give a true bearing. Nor was it straightforward to calculate the sailing distances on these charts. Mariners were aware of these problems and had evolved rules of thumb to enhance the accuracy of their navigation.

Mercator presents his remedy for these problems: "We have progressively increased the degrees of latitude towards each pole in proportion to the lengthenings of the parallels with reference to the equator." The resulting variation of the latitude scale is shown on the meridian at 350°E of his map. Later, Edward Wright and others showed how this statement of Mercator could be turned into a precise mathematical problem whose solution permitted the calculation of the latitude scale, but their methods had not been developed at the time of Mercator. All these methods hinge on the observation that the circumference of a parallel of latitude is proportional to the cosine of the latitude, which is unity at the equator and zero at the poles. The length of a parallel, and hence the spacing of the parallels, must therefore be increased by a factor equal to the reciprocal of the cosine (i.e. the secant) of the latitude.

Mercator left no explanation of his own methods but, as long ago as 1541, he had demonstrated that he understood how to draw rhumb lines on a globe. It has been suggested that he drew the rhumbs by using a set of metal templates for the seven principal compass points within each quadrant, as follows. Starting at the equator draw a short straight line segment, at say 67.5° (east by northeast). Continue as far as a meridian separated by only two or three degrees of longitude and mark the crossing point. Move the template to that point and repeat the process. Since the meridians have converged a little the line will bend up a little generating a rhumb which describes a spiral on the sphere. The latitude and longitude of selected points on the rhumb could have then been transferred to the chart and the latitude scale of the chart adjusted so that the rhumb becomes a straight line. There has been no shortage of proposed methods for the construction. For example, Hollander analyzed fourteen such hypotheses and concluded that Mercator may have used a judicious mix of mechanical transference and numerical interpolations. However he proceeded, Mercator achieved a fairly accurate, but not perfect, latitude scale.

Since the parallels shrink to zero length as they approach the pole they have to be stretched by larger and larger amounts. Correspondingly the parallel spacing must increase by the same ratio. Mercator concludes that "The chart cannot be extended as far as the pole, for the degrees of latitude would finally attain infinity." —Legend 6. (That is, the reciprocal of the cosine of the latitude become infinite). He therefore uses a completely different projection for the inset map of the north polar regions: an azimuthal equidistant projection.

It took many years for Mercator's projection to gain wider acceptance. The following gallery shows the first maps in which it was employed. General acceptance only came with the publication of the French sea atlas "Le Neptune Francois" at the end of the seventeenth century: all the maps in this widely disseminated volume were on the Mercator projection.

The first maps on the Mercator projection
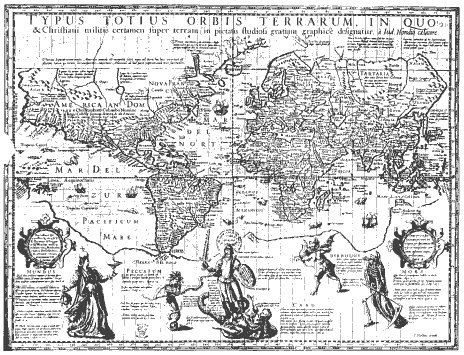
1597 Hondius; The Christian Knight Map

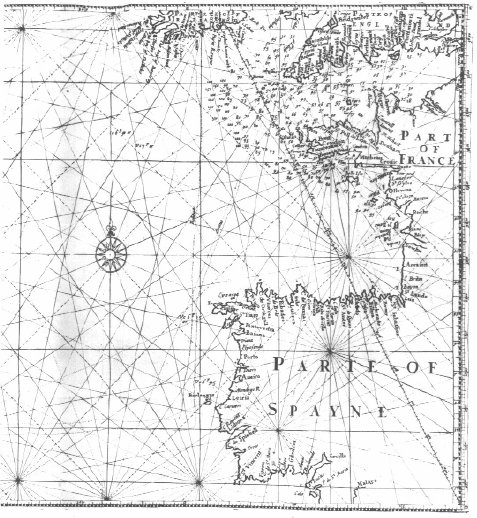
Wright Azores sailing map 1599

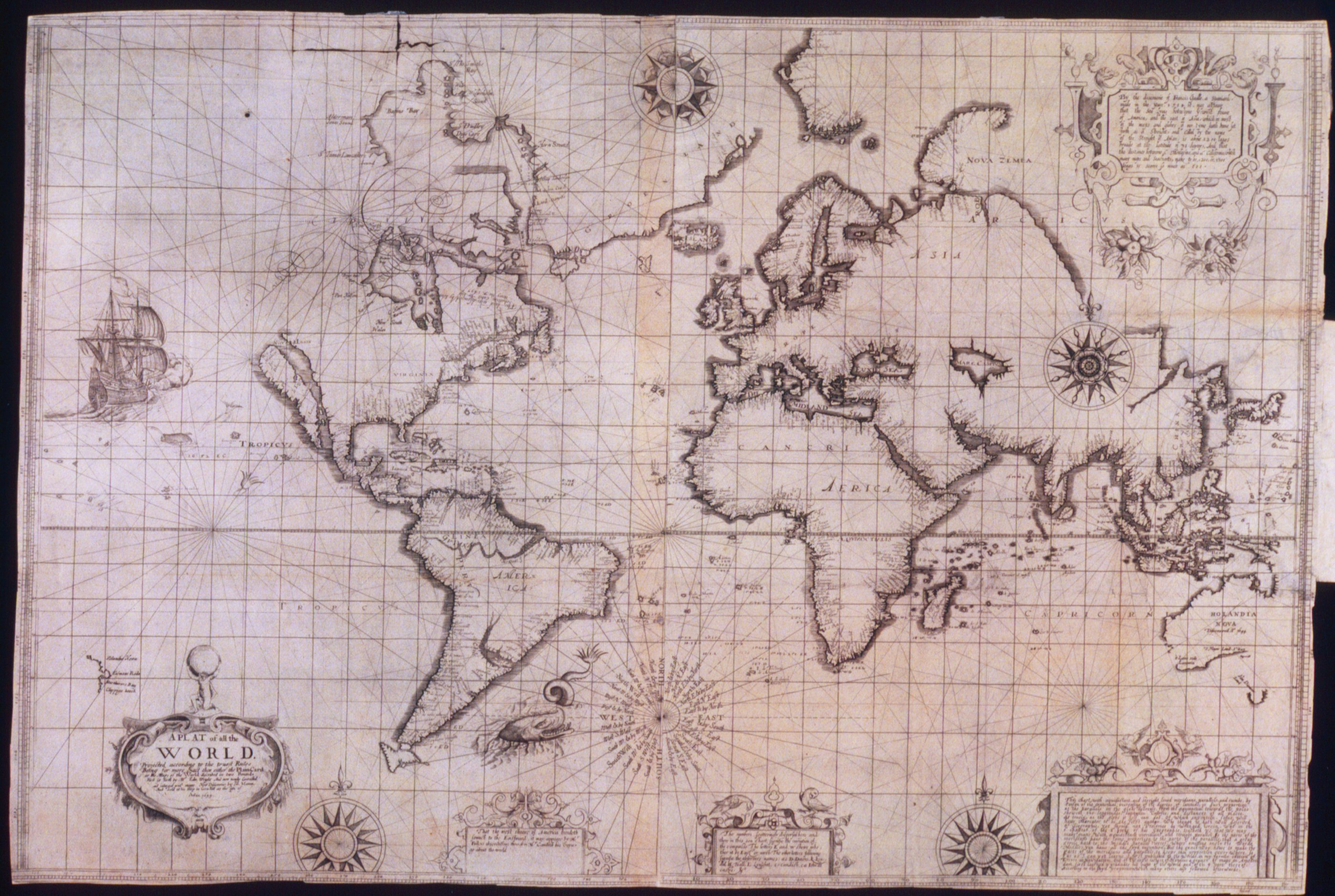
Wright-Moxon world map 1657

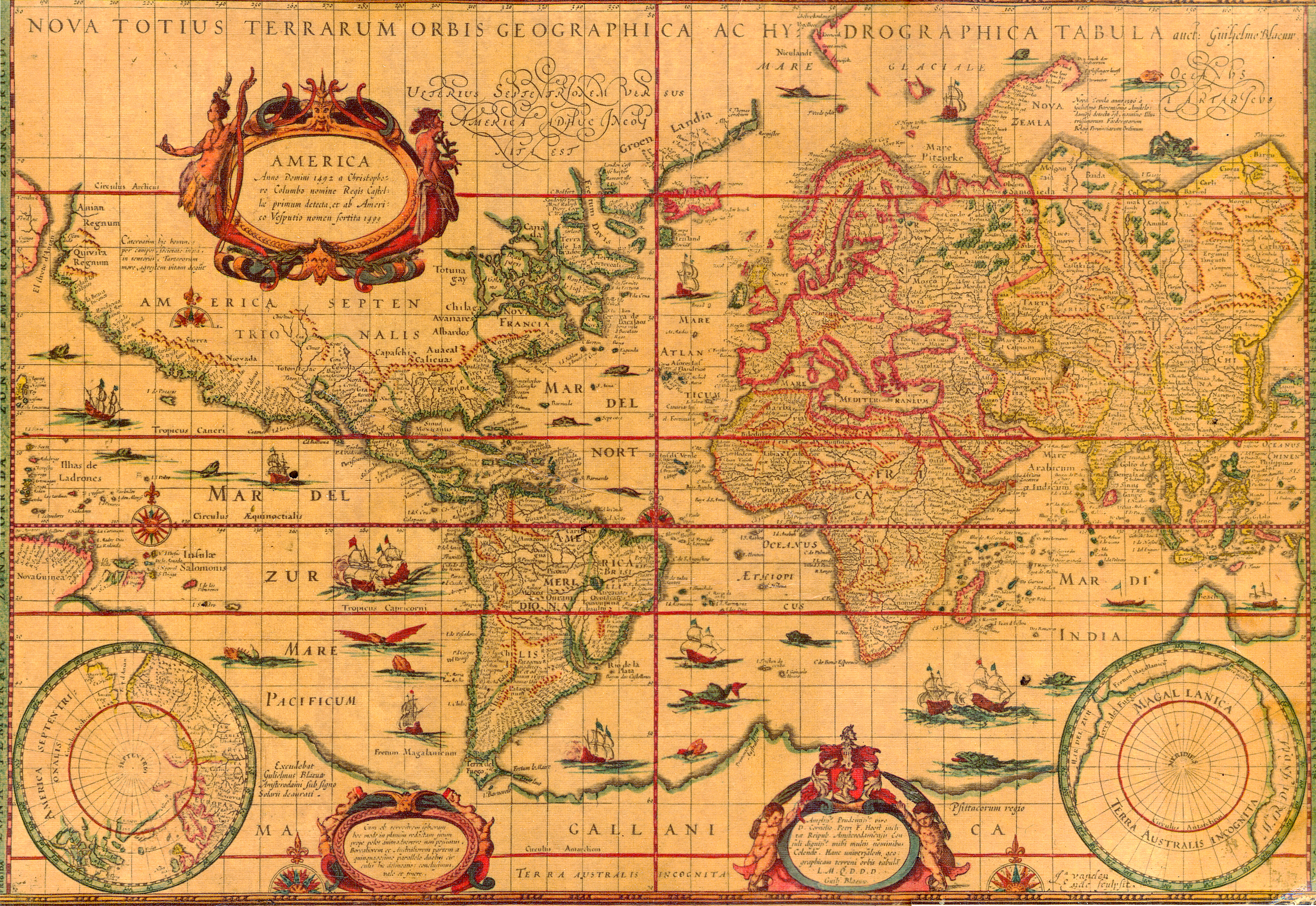
Blaeu atlas 1606 and later editions

=== Distances and the Organum Directorium ===
In Legend 12 Mercator makes careful distinction between great circles (plaga) and rhumb lines (directio) and he points out that the rhumb between two given points is always longer than the great circle distance, the latter being the shortest distance between the points. However, he stresses that over short distances (which he quantifies) the difference may be negligible and a calculation of the rhumb distance may be adequate and more relevant since it is the sailing distance on a constant bearing. He gives the details of such a calculation in a rather cumbersome fashion in Legend 12 but in Legend 10 he says that the same method can be applied more readily with the Organum Directorium (the Diagram of Courses, sheet 18) shown annotated here. Only dividers were used in these constructions but the original maps had a thread attached at the origin of each compass rose. Its use is partially explained in Legend 10.

The Organum Directorium with Mercator's constructions

To illustrate his method take A at (20°N,33°E) and B at (65°N,75°E). Plot the latitude of A on the left hand scale and plot B with the appropriate relative latitude and longitude. Measure the azimuth α, the angle MAB: it can be read off the compass scale by constructing OP parallel to AB; for this example it is 34°. Draw a line OQ through the origin of the compass rose such that the angle between OQ and the equator is equal to the azimuth angle α. Now find the point N on the equator which is such that the number of equatorial degrees in ON is numerically equal to the latitude difference (45° for AM on the unequal scale). Draw the perpendicular through N and let it meet OQ at D. Find the point E such that OE=OD, here approximately 54°. This is a measure of the rhumb line distance between the points on the sphere corresponding to A and B on the spherical Earth. Since each degree on the equator corresponds to 60 nautical miles the sailing distance is 3,240 nautical miles for this example. If B is in the second quadrant with respect to A then the upper rose is used and if B is west of A then the longitude separation is simply reversed. Mercator also gives a refined method which is useful for small azimuths.

The above method is explained in Legend 12 by using compass roses on the equator and it is only in Legend 10 that he introduces the Organum Directorium and also addresses the inverse problems: given the initial point and the direction and distance of the second find the latitude and longitude of the second.

Mercator's construction is simply an evaluation of the rhumb line distance in terms of the latitude difference and the azimuth as
$$s=(\phi_B-\phi_A)\sec\alpha.$$
If the latitude difference is expressed in arc minutes then the distance is in nautical miles.

In later life Mercator commented that the principles of his map had not been understood by mariners but he admitted to his friend and biographer, Walter Ghym, that the map lacked a sufficiently clear detailed explanation of its use. The intention expressed in the last sentence of Legend 10, that he would give more information in a future 'Geographia', was never realized.

=== Prime meridian and magnetic pole ===
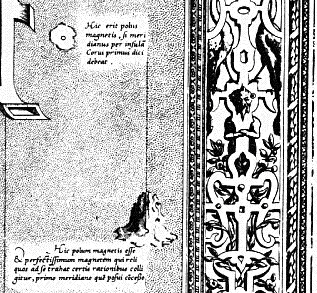
Two possible magnetic poles

In Legend 5 Mercator argues that the Prime Meridian should be identified with that on which the magnetic declination is zero, namely the meridian through the Cape Verde islands, or alternatively that through the island of Corvo in the Azores. (He cites the varying opinions of the Dieppe mariners). The prime meridian is labelled as 360 and the remainder are labelled every ten degrees eastwards. He further claims that he has used information on the geographical variation of declination to calculate the position of the (single) magnetic pole corresponding to the two possible prime meridians: they are shown on Sheet6 with appropriate text. (For good measure he repeats one of these poles on Sheet 1 to emphasize the overlap of the right and left edges of his map; see text). He does not show a position for a south magnetic pole. The model of the Earth as a magnetic dipole did not arise until the end of the seventeenth century, so between AD 1500 and that era the number of magnetic poles was a matter for speculation, variously 1, 2 or 4. Later, he accepted that magnetic declination changed in time, thus invalidating his position that the prime meridian could be chosen on these grounds.

=== Geography ===
In his introduction to the Imago Mundi facsimile edition t' Hoff gives lists of world maps and regional maps that Mercator may well have seen, or even possessed by the 1560s. A more complete illustrated list of world maps of that time may be compiled from the comprehensive survey of Shirley. Comparisons with his own map show how freely he borrowed from these maps and from his own 1538 world map and his 1541 globe.

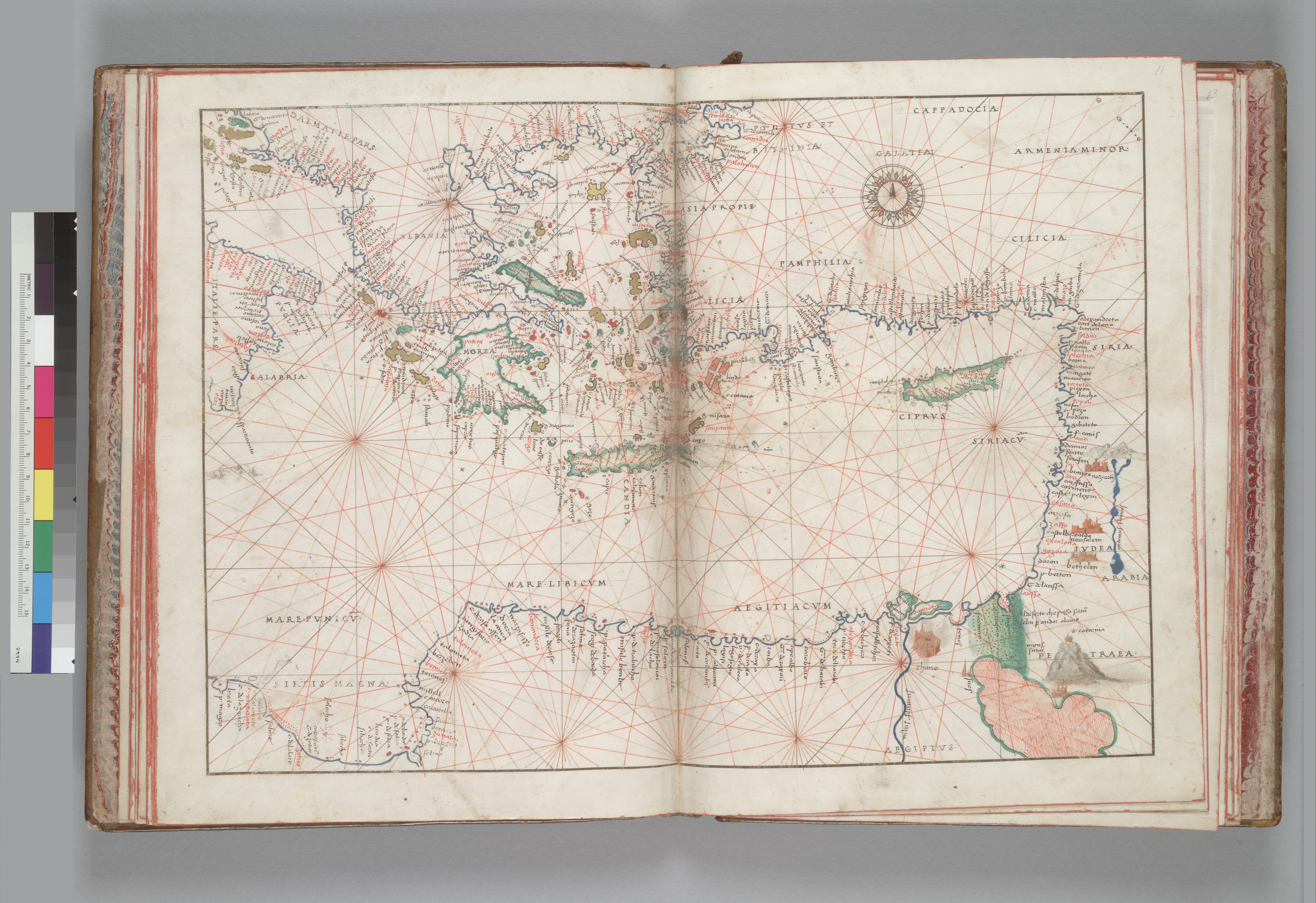
A 1550 portolan of the eastern Mediterranean showing the high quality of coastal mapping.

In addition to published maps and manuscripts Mercator declares (Legend 3) that he was greatly indebted to many new charts prepared by Portuguese and Spanish sailors in the portolan traditions. "It is from an equitable conciliation of all these documents that the dimensions and situations of the land are given here as accurately as possible." Earlier cartographers of world maps had largely ignored the more accurate practical charts of sailors, and vice versa, but the age of discovery, from the closing decades of the fifteenth century, brought together these two traditions in the person of Mercator.

There are great discrepancies with the modern atlas. Europe, the coast of Africa and the eastern coast of the Americas are relatively well covered but beyond that the anomalies increase with distance. For example, the spectacular bulge on the western coast of South America adapted from Ruscelli's 1561 Orbis Descriptio replaced the more accurate representation of earlier maps. That mistake disappears for good with the Blaeu map of 1606.

The Mediterranean basin shows errors similar to those found in contemporary maps. For example, the latitude of the Black Sea is several degrees too high, like in the maps made by Diogo Ribeiro in Seville in the 1520s. However, in Mercator's map the longitude of the entire basin is exaggerated by about 25%, contrary to the very accurate shape depicted by Ribeiro.

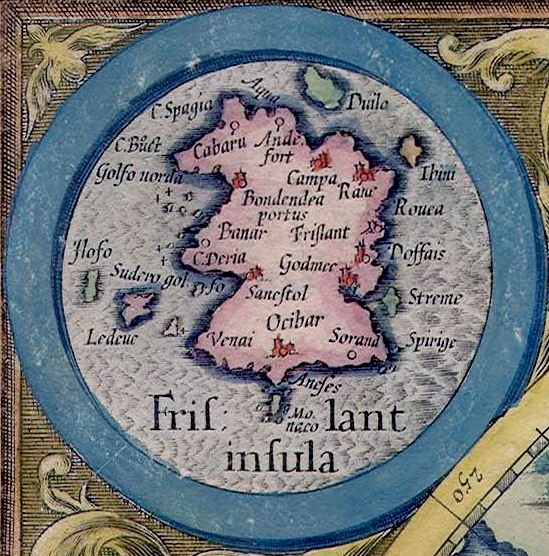
Frisland, a phantom island (as represented on the 1595 Mercator atlas

The phantom islands of Frisland and Brasil in the North Atlantic persist in the maps of the period even though they were in waters readily accessed by European sailors. He does show a Strait of Anian between Asia and the Americas as well as NW and NE passages to the spice islands of the East: this he justifies on his studies of the ancient texts detailed in Legend 3 for as yet these were unexplored regions.

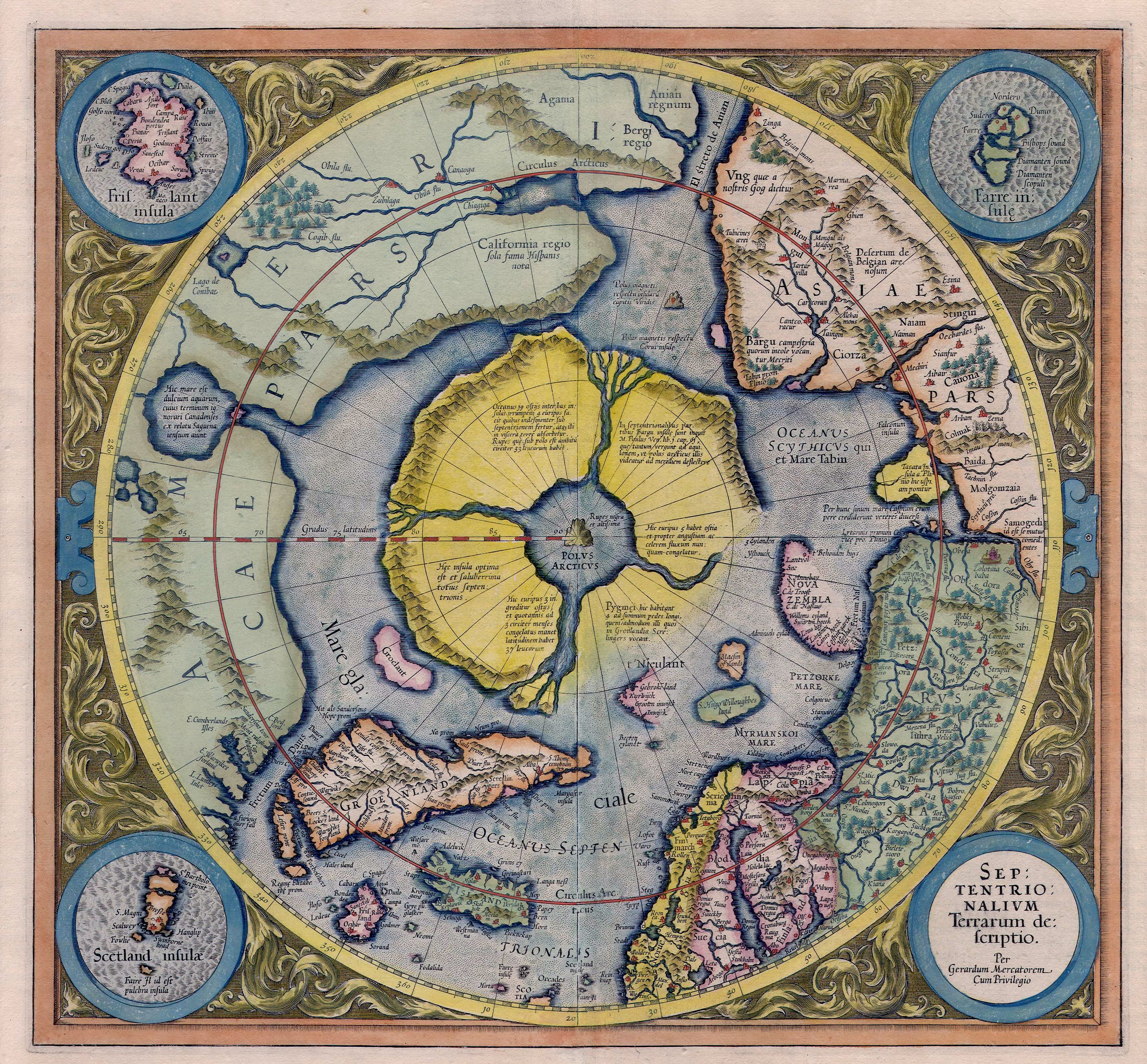
The north polar regions as portrayed in the 1595 atlas.

The bizarre representation of the geography of the north polar regions in the inset is discussed in detail in Legend 6 and in the minor texts of sheet 13. Mercator uses as his reference a fourteenth-century English friar and mathematician who used an astrolabe to survey northern lands. The four channels carry the sea towards the pole where it disappears into an abyss with great force.

Mercator accepted current beliefs in the existence of a large Southern continent (Terra Australis) — beliefs which would prevail until the discovery of the open seas south of Cape Horn and the circumnavigation of Australia. His biographer, Walter Ghim, explained that even though Mercator was not ignorant that the Austral continent still lay hidden and unknown, he believed it could be "demonstrated and proved by solid reasons and arguments to yield in its geometric proportions, size and weight, and importance to neither of the other two, nor possibly to be lesser or smaller, otherwise the constitution of the world could not hold together at its centre".

Beyond Europe the interiors of the continents were unknown but Mercator struggled to combine the scattered data at his disposal into a harmonious whole in the map legends which speculate on the Asian Prester John and the courses of the Ganges, Nile and Niger. For his geographical information Mercator quotes (Legends 3, 4, 8, 11, 14) classic authors such as Pliny the Elder, Pomponius Mela, Ptolemy, and earlier travellers such as Marco Polo but, as the principal geographer of his time, he would have undoubtedly have been in touch with contemporary travellers.

=== Navigational inaccuracy ===
Mercator was not a navigator himself and, while he was obviously aware of the concept of rhumb line, he missed several key practical aspects of navigation. As a result, his world map "was useless for navigation at the time it was created because navigation was something very different from his idealized concept".

Mercator had to work from the geographic information contained in his source maps, which of course was not always accurate, but he may have also introduced errors of his own by misinterpreting the mathematical structure of the Portuguese and Spanish charts of his time. In addition, even if his sources had been perfect, Mercator's map would have still been of little practical use for navigators due to lack of reliable data on magnetic declination and to the difficulty of determining longitude accurately at sea.

These technical reasons explain why Mercator's projection was not widely adopted for marine charts until the 18th century.

=== Decorative features ===
High resolution details
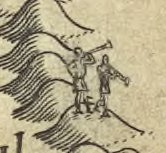
musicians text sheet

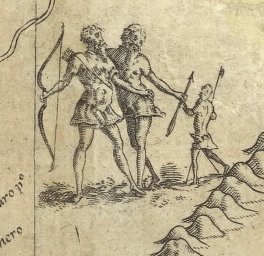
giants text sheet

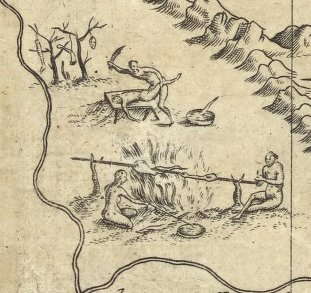
cannibals text sheet

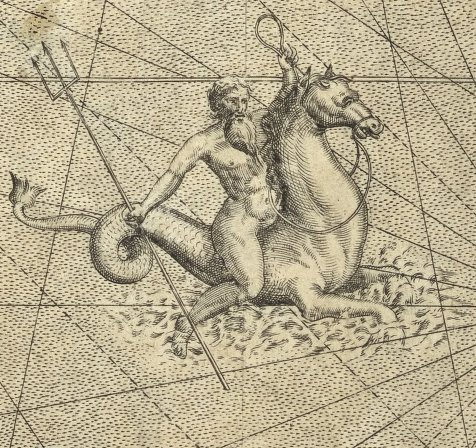
Poseidon sheet

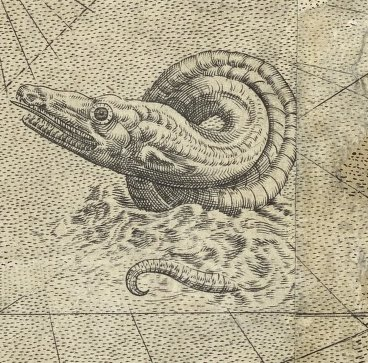
sea monster sheet

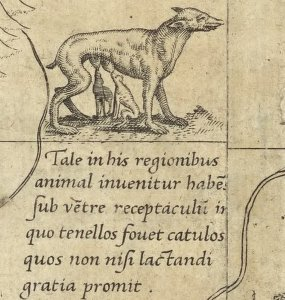
animal text sheet

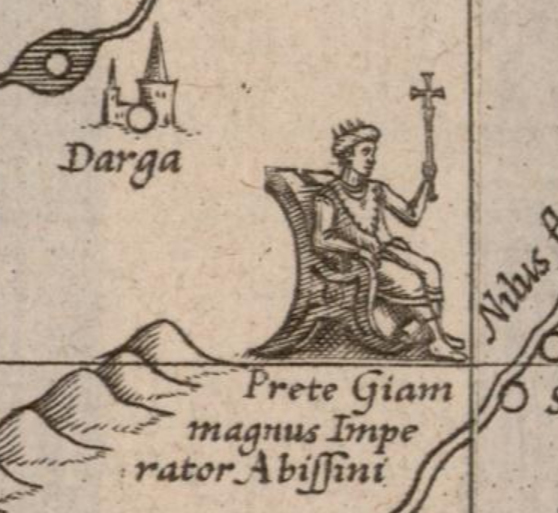
Prester John sheet

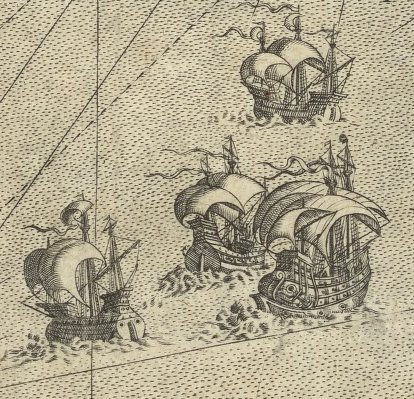
Ships sheet

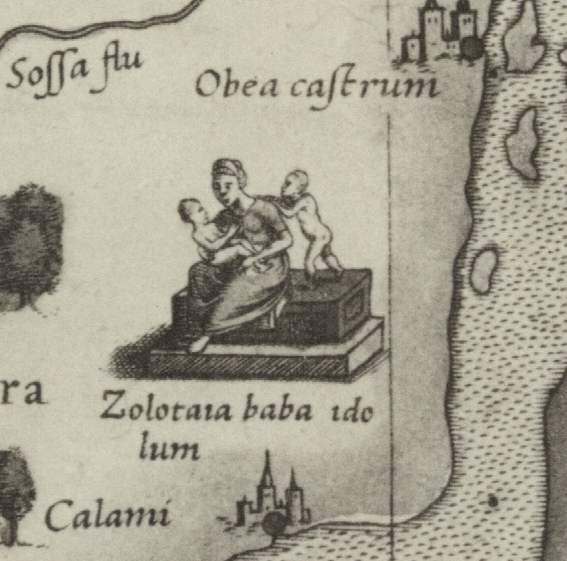
Golden Woman sheet

The ornate border of the map shows the 32 points of the compass. The cardinal appoints appear in various forms: west is Zephyrus, Occides, West, Ponente, Oeste; east is Subsola, Oriens, Oost, Levante, Este; south is Auster, Meridio, Zuya Ostre, Sid; north is Boreas, Septentrio, Nord, tramontana. All of the other 28 points are written only in Dutch, confirming Mercator's wish that his map would be put to practical use by mariners.

Within the map Mercator embellishes the open seas with fleets of ships, sea creatures, of which one is a dolphin, and a striking god-like figure which may be Triton. The unknown continental interiors are remarkably devoid of creatures and Mercator is for the most part content to create speculative mountain ranges, rivers and cities. The only land animal, in South America, is shown as "... having under the belly a receptacle in which it keeps its young warm and takes them out but to suckle them." ((40°S,295°E) with text.) He also shows cannibals but this may have been true. The giants shown in Patagonia may also be founded in truth: the reaction of Spanish sailors of slight stature on confronting a tribe of natives who were well over six foot in height. These images of South Americans are almost direct copies of similar figures on the #World and regional maps before 1569 map of Diego Gutierrez. There are three other images of figures: Prester John in Ethiopia (10°N,60°E); a tiny vignette of two 'flute' players (72°N,170°E) (see text); the Zolotaia baba at (60°N,110°E). (Zolotaia baba also may be found on the Mercator map of the North Pole near the right border at mid-height).

The italic script used on the map was largely developed by Mercator himself. He was a great advocate of its use, insisting that it was much clearer than any other. He published an influential book, Literarum latinorum, showing how the italic hand should be executed.

== Texts of the map ==
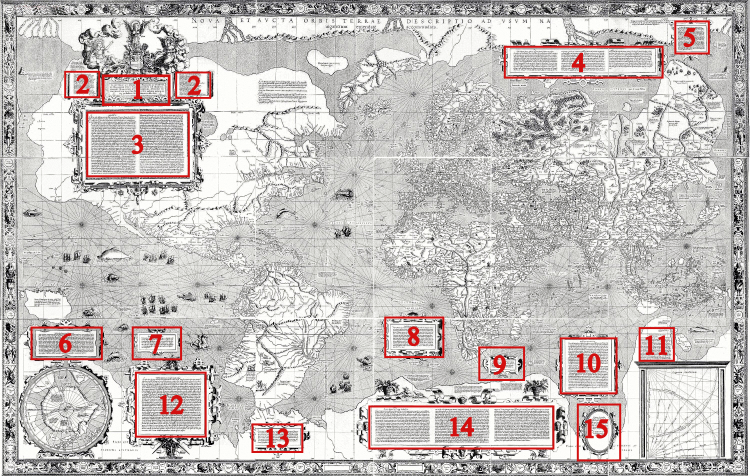

Links to the
legend texts

1 2 3 4 5
6 7 8 9 10
11 12 13 14 15

Minor texts

=== Summary of the legends ===
- Legend 1 The dedication to his patron, the Duke of Cleves.
- Legend 2 A eulogy, in Latin hexameters, expressing his good fortune at living in Cleves after having fled from persecution by the Inquisition.
- Legend 3 Inspectori Salutem: greetings to the reader. Mercator sets forth three motivations for his map: (1) an accurate representation of locations and distances corrected for the use of sailors by the adoption of a new projection; (2) an accurate representation of countries and their shapes; (3) to stay true to the understanding of ancient writers.
- Legend 4 The Asian Prester John and the origin of the Tartars.
- Legend 5 The prime meridian and how a logical choice could be made on the basis of a study of magnetic declination.
- Legend 6 The north polar (septentrional) regions.
- Legend 7 Magellan's circumnavigation of the world.
- Legend 8 The Niger and Nile rivers and their possible linkage.
- Legend 9 Vasco de Gama.
- Legend 10 The use of the Organum Directorium, the Diagram of courses, for the measurement of rhumb line distance.
- Legend 11 The southern continent Terra Australis and its relation to Java.
- Legend 12 The distinction between great circles and rhumb lines and the measurement of the latter.
- Legend 13 The 1493 papal bull arbitrating on the division between Spanish and Portuguese spheres of influence.
- Legend 14 The Ganges and the geography of south-east Asia.
- Legend 15 The copyright notice.

=== Legend texts ===
The following literal translations are taken, with permission of the International Hydrographics Board, from the Hydrographic Review. The Latin text differs from that of Mercator in using modern spelling. Punctuation has been modified or added. Paragraph breaks have been added where required.

Map legends, in Latin and English
| Original Latin | English translation |
|---|---|
| NOVA ET AUCTA ORBIS TERRAE DESCRIPTIO AD USUM NAVIGANTIUM EMENDATE ACCOMMODATA | NEW AND MORE COMPLETE REPRESENTATION OF THE TERRESTRIAL GLOBE PROPERLY ADAPTED FOR USE IN NAVIGATION |
| Legend 1 — Illustrissimo et clementissimo principi | To the most illustrious and clement prince |
| ILLUSTRISSIMO ET CLEMENTISSIMO PRINCIPI AC DOMINO, DOMINO WILHELMO DUCI JULIAE, CLIVORUM ET MONTIS, COMITI MARCHIAE ET RAVENSBURGI, DOMINO IN RAVENSTEIN opus hoc felicibus ejus auspiciis inchoatum atque perfectum Gerardus Mercator dedicabat. | TO THE MOST ILLUSTRIOUS AND CLEMENT PRINCE AND LORD WILHELM DUKE OF JUILLERS, OF CLEVES AND OF MONT, COUNT OF THE MARCHES AND OF RAVENSBURG, LORD OF RAVENSTEIN, this work, commenced and ended under his favourable patronage, was dedicated by Gerhard Mercator. |
| Legend 2 — Felices patriae, felicia regna | Happy countries, happy kingdoms |
| Felices patriae, felicia regna perennes In quibus exubias agitat Jovis alma propago Justitia, et sceptris divino Astraea receptis Munere se sociat, rectosque ad sidera vultus Extollens, summi moderatur cuncta monarchae Ad placitum, miseros regno studet illius uni Subdere mortales, finem sectata beatum. Pax illic immota ducem comitata potentem Justitiam, et Pietas nullo tristata labore Jucundas, faciles, et amico plebis habenas Obsequio firmas faciunt, animique per omnes Fortunae eventus robur constanter adaugent Aspirante deo, nec si quid turbinis atri Invida virtutis commoto Acheronte ciebit Impietas, timor ullus adest, pater optimus ille Culmine qui mundi residens nutu omnia solo Cogit, opus regnumque suum non deseret unquam. Jam quoque cum tali regitur moderamine civis Non timit insidias, non horrida bella, famemque Squalentem indignis sycophantae morsibus ansae Praecisae, Pietas et Pax soror omne malignum Blanda terit facinus retegitve inoxia turba Sola tenet laudem, solis qui dona sequuntur In commune bonum sua conceduntur honores, Improbitas despecta jacet, virtutis armorem Passim exempla movent, et amanter foedera nectunt Mutua sollicitos regi servire deoque. Sic regnat sanctè cui sunt condredita sceptra, Et pariter qui sceptra dedit, sic gaudet uterque Innocuum genuisse gregem qui floreat usque Justitia, pacemque colat, tum pneumatis almi Mente hilari tractet referatque charismata pure. Gaude Clivorum soboles, et Julia gaude, Vos beat una domus, beat et qui regibus unus Imperat, haud quicquam est quod non sinat esse beatos. | Happy countries, happy kingdoms in which Justice, noble progeny of Jupiter, reigns eternal and where Astraea, having regrasped her sceptre, associates herself with divine goodness, raising her eyes straight to the heavens, governs all in accordance with the will of the Supreme Monarch and devotes herself to the submission of unfortunate mortals to His sole empery, seeking happiness. There undisturbed Peace, companying with all-powerful Justice which guides it, and Piety, which no trials have cast down, make the curb pleasant, easy and firm thanks to the loving obedience of the peoples and, by Divine favour, hearts ever become greater, come such fortune as may; and though Impiousness, the enemy of virtue, causing Acheron to riot, raises some gloomy disorder, no terror is felt: this allgood Father who, residing on the crest of the world, orders all things by a nod of His head, will never desert His works or His kingdom. When the citizen is in this wise governed he fears no ambush, he has no dread of horrible wars and mournful famine, all pretences are swept away from the unworthy backbiting of sycophants; Piety, and her beneficent sister Peace, either hinder or discover all malevolent deeds, the innocent herd alone is the object of praise, and honours are given to those only who employ their gifts in view of the common good; dishonesty, despised, lies prone, virtuous deeds everywhere call forth friendship and mutual treaties bind men solicitous of serving their King and their God. Thus saintly reigns he to whom the sceptres have been given and, even so, He who gave them; thus they both rejoice that they have made an innocent flock which continues to prosper by justice and to ensue peace and which welcomes with a joyous heart and reflects holly the graces of the beneficent Spirit. Rejoice, ye men of Cleves, rejoice ye of Juillers, a single house blesses you and He also, who alone compels kings, blesses you; there is nothing which can hinder you from being happy. |
| Legend 3 — Inspectori Salutem | To the readers of this chart, greetings |
| In hac orbis descriptione tria nobis curae fuerunt. Primum sphaerae superficiem ita in planum extendere, ut situs locorum tam secundem directionem distantiamque veram quam secundum longitudinem latitudinemque debitam undequaque inter se correspondeant, ac regionum figurae in sphera apparentes, quatenus fieri potest, serventur, ad quod nova meridianorum ad parallelos habitudine et situs opus fuit, quae enim a geographis hactenus editae sunt conscriptiones meridianorum curvitate et ad invicem inclinatione inidoneae sunt ad navigationes, in extremitatibus quoque figuras situsque regionum, propter obliquam meridianorum in parallelos incidentiam, adeo mire distorquent, ut agnosci non possint, nec distantiarum rationes observari. In marinis nauclerorum tabulis gradus longitudinum per omnes parallelos usque in polum crescunt supra sphaericam rationem, nam perpetuo aequales manent gradibus aequatoris, at gradus latitudinum minime crescunt, quare ibi quoque distrahi enormiter figuras regionum necesse est, et vel longitudines ac latitudines, vel directiones distantiasque a vero aberrare, et cum magni ea causa errores committantur, ille caput est, quod trium locorum inscriptione ex uno aequinoctialis latere facta secundum triangularem aliquam dispositionem, si medius quivis extremis justa directione et distantia respondeat, impossibile sit extremos similiter inter se respondere, quibus consideratis gradus latitudinum versus utrumque polum paulatim auximus pro incremento parallelorum supra rationem quam habent ad aequinoctialem, quo id consecuti sumus, ut quomodocunque quis duos tres pluresve locos inscribat, modo ex his 4: differentia longitudinis, differentia latitudinis, distantia, directione, duo quaelibet in unoquoque loco ad alterum collato observet, recte se habebunt omnia in cujuslibet loci ad quemlibet collatione, et nullus uspiam error commissus reperietur, quem in vulgaribus naucleorum tabulis multis modis potissimum in majoribus latitudinibus admitti necesse est. Alterum quod intendimus fuit, ut terrarum situs magnitudines locorumque distantias juxta ipsam veritatem quantum assequi licet exhiberemus, in hoc extremam diligentiam impendimus, marinas Castellanorum Portogalensiumque tabulas, tum inter se, tum cum plerisque navigationibus impressis et scriptis conferentes, ex quibus omnibus aequabiliter inter se conciliatis hanc terrarum dimensionem et situm damus, secundum ea quae hactenus observata sunt et ad nostras manus pervenire potuerunt castigatissimum. Tertium quod tractandum suscepimus fuit: ostendere quae partes orbis et quousque veteribus innotuerint, quo antquae geographiae limites non ignorentur, et priscis saeculis suus honos deferatur. Dicimus autem tres esse distinctas continentes, primam e cujus medio creatum multiplicatumque genus humanum in omnem undique terram disseminatum est, secundam quae nova India dicitur, tertiam quae meridiano cardini subjacet. Harum posteriores duae veteribus ignotae penitus permanserunt nisi forte nova India sit quae apud Platonem est Atlantis. Prima tametsi tota non fuerit a Ptolemeo in tabulas assumpta, omnis tamen ambitus ejus occeano terminari agnitus et maxima parte a veteribus descriptus est. Et quod ad tabularem Ptolemei descriptionem attinet, ex his, que de Gangis situ demonstravimus in hoc opere, constat eam comprehensis insulis quas ibi dicimus ab orientali parte as Thamum usque Cathai promontorium progredi, ubi (ut Melae placet) extremus Indiae angulus, meridionalis lateris terminus initiumque orientalis existit. A meridie hinc quidem ad Prassum Africae promontorium et Madagascar insulam, inde vero ad Hippodromum Aethiopiae in medio sinu Hesperico terminatur. Septentrionalis orae extrema post Cimbrorum promontorium est Livonia, sed assumptis simul insulis Scandia, Albione, Hibernia, Ebudibus, Orcadibus, et Islandia, quam certum est esse Thulen ex Plinio: lib :2. cap:75, et lib :4. cap :16, Solino cap :25, et Pomponio: Mela lib:3. cap:6. Reliquus ambitus septentrionalis a Plinio transcensis Riphaeis jugis describitur, et ex sinistro littore Scythici oceani Norvegiam Suediam et Finlandiam sub nominibus Balthia Basilia Scandinavia et Eningia perlustrat lib :4. cap :13, sed tanquam insulas, quod isthmum qui Finnicum sinum a Grandvico disjungit ignoraret. Dextrum littus prosequens lib :6. cap :13 primum post Hyperboreas gentes Lytarmem Riphei montis promontorium ponit, deinde Arimpheos plurimasque alias nationes quae circum mare Caspium ejusque ostia sunt, putabat enim in oceanum Scythicum erumpere, postea cap :17 residui littoris conditionibus et populis enarratis Tabin promontorium superat, et per conversam in orientem aestivum littorum faciem ad Seras procedit, denique in Indiam revertitur. Quod item reliquum erat Africae a Prasso promontorio ad sinum Hespericum, Jubae regis testimonio circumnavigabile dicit lib :6. cap :29, assignatis etiam aliquot stationibus ejus navigationis qua ex India in Mauretaniam itur. Et multo antea, ut est apud Herodotum: lib :4, jussu Nechaonis, Aegypti regis, Phoenices quidam Arabico sinu egressi bienno Africam usque ad columnas Herculis circumnavigarunt. Et postea Eudoxus quidam apud Melam, cum Lathyrum regem Alexandriae profugeret Arabico sinu egressus Gades usque pervectus est. Certum est igitur oceano cingi continentem nostram, et a veteribus ambitum ejus notum, ac pro maxima parte descriptum esse ipsorum autoritate constat, quare manifestum est errare eos qui novam Indiam cum Asia continentem faciunt, quemadmodum et eos qui Portogalensium navigationes Asiaticas longe Ptolemei descriptionem superare affirmant cum juxta ea quae de Gangis et Aureae situ adferimus multum adhuc ab ejusdem termino distare eas constet. | In making this representation of the world we had three preoccupations. Firstly, to spread on a plane the surface of the sphere in such a way that the positions of places shall correspond on all sides with each other both in so far as true direction and distance are concerned and as concerns correct longitudes and latitudes; then, that the forms of the parts be retained, so far as is possible, such as they appear on the sphere. With this intention we have had to employ a new proportion and a new arrangement of the meridians with reference to the parallels. Indeed, the forms of the meridians, as used till now by geographers, on account of their curvature and their convergence to each other, are not utilisable for navigation; besides, at the extremities, they distort the forms and positions of regions so much, on account of the oblique incidence of the meridians to the parallels, that these cannot be recognised nor can the relation of distances be maintained. On the charts of navigators the degrees of longitude, as the various parallels are crossed successively towards the pole, become gradually greater with reference to their length on the sphere, for they are throughout equal to the degrees on the equator, whereas the degrees of latitude increase but very little, so that, on these charts also, the shapes of regions are necessarily very seriously stretched and either the longitudes and latitudes or the directions and distances are incorrect; thereby great errors are introduced of which the principal is the following: if three places forming any triangle on the same side of the equator be entered on the chart and if the central one, for example, be correctly placed with reference to the outer ones as to accurate directions and distances, it is impossible that the outer ones be so with reference to each other. It is for these reasons that we have progressively increased the degrees of latitude towards each pole in proportion to the lengthening of the parallels with reference to the equator; thanks to this device we have obtained that, however two, three or even more than three, places be inserted, provided that of these four quantities: difference of longitude, difference of latitude, distance and direction, any two be observed for each place associated with another, all will be correct in the association of any one place with any other place whatsoever and no trace will anywhere be found of any of those errors which must necessarily be encountered on the ordinary charts of shipmasters, errors of all sorts, particularly in high latitudes. The second object at which we aimed was to represent the positions and the dimensions of the lands, as well as the distances of places, as much in conformity with very truth as it is possible so to do. To this we have given the greatest care, first by comparing the charts of the Castilians and of the Portuguese with each other, then by comparing them with the greater number of records of voyages both printed and in manuscript. It is from an equitable conciliation of all these documents that the dimensions and situations of the land are given here as exactly as possible, account being taken of all observations made till now which have come into our hands. The third of our aims was to show which are the parts of the universe which were known to the ancients and to what extent they knew them, in order that the limitations of ancient geography be not unknown and that the honour which is due to past centuries be given to them. Now we hold that there are three distinct continents: the first, in the centre of which the human race was created and whence it spread, by multiplying, over all the face of the earth, the second which is called the New Indies and the third which lies in Southern parts. Of these continents, the two last remained entirely unknown to the ancients, unless the New Indies be the land which Plato calls Atlantis. Though the first be not entirely included in Ptolemy's charts yet it was known that, throughout its periphery, it was limited by the Ocean and the greater part of it has been described by the ancients. And, with reference to Ptolemy's cartographic description, the outcome of that which is set out in the present work on the subject of the position of the Ganges is that, including therein the islands there mentioned on the eastern side, it extends as far as Thamus, a promontory of Cathay where, as maintained by Mela, is the extremity of India, the end of the southern side and the beginning of the eastern side. On the South therefrom, in truth as far as Cape Prassum (Note: Cape Prassum has been identified with Mozambique.) in Africa and to the Isle of Madagascar, thence to the Hippodrome of Ethiopia, it ends in the middle of the Gulf of Hesperia. (Note: The Gulf of Hesperia has been identified with the River Gambia.) The extreme of the northern coast after the Cape of the Cimbri is Livonia, but including as well the isles of Scandinavia, Albion, Ireland, the Hebrides, Orkney and Iceland, which evidently is Thule according to Pliny, Bk.2, chap.75 and Bk.4, chap.16, Solinus chap.25, and Pomponius Mela Bk.3, chap.6. The remainder of the northern boundary after crossing the Riphei Mountains is described by Pliny and on the left hand shore of the Scythian Ocean, he discusses Norway, Sweden and Finland under the names of Balthia, Basilia, Scandinavia and Eningia in Bk.4, chap.13, but he described them as islands for he was unaware of the isthmus which separates the Gulf of Finland from Grandvic. Then, following the right hand shore in Bk.6, chap.13, he places first, after the Hyperborean nations, Lytarmis, a promontory of Mount Rypheus, then the Arimpheans and most of the other nations who dwell around the Caspian Sea and its mouths, in fact he believed that it flowed into the Scythian Ocean; thence, having enumerated and described, in chap.17, the position and the peoples of the rest of the shore, he rounds Cape Tabis and arrives at the Serae by that side of the shores which faces the summer sunrise; thereafter he reverts to India. As for the remainder of Africa from Cape Prassum as far as the Gulf of Hesperia, he recounts, in Bk.6, chap.29, that, according to the statement of King Juba, one may go round it by sea, even mentioning a few ports of call on this circumnavigation by which Mauretania is reached from India. And much earlier, as is stated by Herodotus, Bk.4, several Phenicians, by order of Necho, king of Egypt, sailed out of the Persian Gulf and, in two years, rounded Africa by sea as far as the Pillars of Hercules. And, later, a certain Eudoxus, in Mela, when he fled before King Lathyrus at Alexandria, going out of the Persian Gulf was driven as far as Gades. Hence it is certain that the whole of our continent is surrounded by water and that all its coasts were known to the ancients and it is clear that the descriptions thereof are founded on their own observations; therefrom it is manifest that those who think that the New Indies form part of the same continent as Asia are in error, as are also those who affirm that the voyages of the Portuguese in Asia extend far beyond Ptolemy's chart, for it is evident, from that which we put forward on the subject of the positions of the Ganges and of the Golden Peninsula, that they are yet very far from reaching the limit of this chart. |
| Legend 4 — De presbytero Joanne Asiatico | On Prester John of Asia |
| De presbytero Joanne Asiatico et prima dominii Tartarorum origine. Eo tempore quo communibus copiis Syriae a Christianis obsessa et expugnata est, anno 1098, erat monarcha regionum Orientalium Asiae Coir Cham, quo mortuo sacerdos quidam et pastor Nestorianus arripuit dominium populi Naimam in terra Naiam, ac deinceps totius Orientis imperium, vocatusque est (ut erat) presbiter et rex Joannes; quo defuncto imperium sibi arrogavit frater ejus Vuth, qui in Carocoran dominabatur, et Cham se vocavit, id est dominum. Hic dum metueret succrescentes multitudinem et vires Sumongularum, hoc est aquaticorum Mongulorum, qui proprie Tartari dicebantur a Tartar flumine patrio, quanquam nec regem nec civitatem haberent sed pastores tantum essent et tributum annuum penderent, voluit illos in varias regiones dispergere quo rebellandi potentiam frangeret, verum illi cognationis et mutuae societatis jura relinquere nolentes conspiratione facta fugerunt versus aquilonem, amplam ibi et natura munitam regionem occupantes, in qua etiam negato tributo tueri se possent et libertatem vindicare. Post paucos vero annos, cum (ut habet Gulielmus Tripolitanus) gregibus imperatoris sui Vutcham graverentur caeteri Mongali, aut alioqui forte propter ereptum Tartarorum tributum vexarentur, faber quidam ferrarius Mongalus, nomine Chinchis communis injuriae pellendae et libertatis afferendae avidus Jecmongalos ad defectionem sollicitat, Tartaros revocat, et communicatis consiliis omnium consensu rex creatur anno Domini 1187, mox eas regiones quae citra Belgian montem erant invadens facile omnes adeptus est, quoniam ut erat prudens, recte victoria utebatur, in victos minime saeviebat, sed unicuique lubenter se submittendi et militiae operam suam communicanti vitam conjuges liberos et substantiam omnem salvam esse jubebat. Deinde montem Belgian ubi in oceanum excurrit superansagressus est regnum Tenduc sedem imperialem Vutcham, quo devicto factus est monarcha orientis, vixit post Vutchamsex annis, in quibus multas provincias imperio suo adjecit. Sic imperium ad Mongalos pervenit et Tartarorum dicitur, cum quod horum occasione et opera conquisitum sit, tum maxime quod communi jure et societate viventes Mongali omnes generaliter Tartari vocarentur. Mansit autem Vutcham cum sua posteritate rex Tenduc, sed sub tributo et Tartarorum imperio. Haec breviter collegimus ex Marco Paulo Veneto, Haitono Armeno, et Gulielmo Tripolitano Dominicano Anconensi, qui anno 1275 a Gregorio 10 missus fuit ad Tartaros, quo prima dominii Tartarici origo et sedes nota esset, ac de veritate ejus Presbiteri Joannis qui in Asia regnare creditus est hactenus, tum quoque diversum esse eum ab illo, qui usque hodie in Africa Prete Giam appellatur, constaret. | On the Priest John of Asia and the earliest origin of the dominion of the Tartars. At the time when Antioch in Syria was besieged and taken by the allied forces of the Christians in the year 1098 the sovereign of the eastern parts of Asia was Coir Cham. At his death a Nestorian priest and shepherd seized the dominion of the Naiman people in the country of Naiam (obviously misspelled for Naiman) and thereafter became the absolute master of the whole Orient and he was called, as indeed he was, Priest and King John. When he died his brother Vuth, who reigned in the Carocoran, seized the power and called himself Cham, that is Master. As he feared the multitude and the growing power of the Sumongols, that is to say the aquatic Mongols who were properly called Tartars, from the name of the river Tartar of their homeland, though they had neither king nor state and were but shepherds who paid an annual tribute, he desired to disperse them into different countries thus breaking all power of rebellion; but they, unwilling to give up their right of kinship and of mutual association, made a vow and fled to the northward where they seized a very vast country, fortified by nature, in which they would be able to defend themselves, even though they refused to pay the tribute, and thus save their liberty. A few years later, as the other Mongols (as is related by William of Tripoli) were molested by the armies of their Emperor Vutcham, or else perchance were illtreated on account of the suppression of the tribute of the Tartars, a Mongol working blacksmith called Chinchis, anxious to remove the common affront and to obtain liberation, invited the Jecmongols to rebel and called in the Tartars; after all had, with one accord, made resolutions he was elected king by unanimous decision in the year of Our Lord 1187. Shortly afterwards he invaded the countries beyond Mount Belgian and easily conquered the whole of this land for, being wise, he knew how to make full use of the victories, exercising no cruelties on the conquered and, to those who willingly gave their submission and who took service in his army, he granted their lives and allowed them to retain their wives and children and to have free enjoyment of all their goods. Thereafter, crossing Mount Belgian at the place where it meets the Ocean, he attacked the kingdom of Tenduc, the seat of the Emperor Vutcham. Having conquered him he became the monarch of the East. He lived six years after Vutcham during which he added numerous provinces to his empire. Thus the dominion passed to the Mongols and it is called the Empire of the Tartars, not only for that it was obtained because of and thanks to them, but particularly because all the Mongols who lived together under common laws were called Tartars. Vutcham and his descendants remained kings of Tenduc but paid tribute to and were under the dominion of the Tartars. We have briefly summarized this information gathered from Marco Polo, the Venetian, Hayton the Armenian and William of Tripoli, a Dominican of Ancona who, in the year 1275, was sent by Gregory X to the Tartars in order to ascertain the primal origin and the seat of the Tartar dominion and to determine the true personality of this Prester John who was believed to be still reigning in Asia and in order clearly to show that he was not the same as he who, till today, is called Prete Giam in Africa. |
| Legend 5 — De longitudinum | On longitudes |
| De longitudinum geographicarum initio et polo. Testatur Franciscus Diepanus peritissimus navarchus volubiles libellas magnetis virtute infectas recta mundi polum respicere in insulis C.Viridis, Salis, Bonavista, et Maio, cui proxime astipulantur qui in Tercera aut S. Maria (insulae sunt inter Acores) id fieri dicunt, pauci in earundem occidentalissima Corvi nomine id contingere opinantur. Quia vero locorum longitudines a communi magnetis et mundi meridiano justis de causis initium sumere opportet plurimum testimonium secutus primum meridianum per dictas C.Viridis insulas protraxi, et quum alibi plus minusque a polo deviante magnete polum aliquem peculiarem esse oporteat quo magnetes ex omni mundi parte respiciant cum hoc quo assignavi loco existere adhibita declinatione magnetis Ratisbonae observata didici. Supputavi autem ejus poli situm etiam respectu insulae Corvi, ut juxta extremos primi meridiani positus extremi etiam termini, intra quos polum hunc inveniri necesse est, conspicui fierent, donec certius aliquid naucleorum observatio attulerit. | On the origin of the geographical longitudes and on the magnetic pole. Francis of Dieppe, a skilful shipmaster, asserts that movable balances, after being infected with the virtue of a magnet, point directly to the Earth's pole in the Isles of Cape Verde: Sal, Bonavista and Maio. This is closely supported by those who state that this occurs at Terceira or S. Maria (which are isles of the Azores); some believe that this is the case at the most westerly of these islands which is called Corvo. Now, since it is necessary that longitudes of places should, for good reasons, have as origin the meridian which is common to the magnet and the World, in accordance with a great number of testimonies I have drawn the prime meridian through the said Isles of Cape Verde; and as the magnet deviates elsewhere more or less from the pole, there must be a special pole towards which magnets turn in all parts of the world, therefore I have ascertained that this is in reality at the spot where I have placed it by taking into account the magnetic declination observed at Ratisbon. But I have likewise calculated the position of this pole with reference to the Isle of Corvo in order that note may be taken of the extreme positions between which, according to the extreme positions of the prime meridian, this pole must lie until the observations made by seamen have provided more certain information. |
| Legend 6 — In subjectam septentrionalis | On the septentrional (northern) regions |
| Cum in polum extendi tabula nostra non posset, latitudinis gradibus tandem in infinitum excurrentibus, et decriptionis aliquid haud quaquam negligendae sub ipso septentrione haberemus, necessarium putavimus extrema descriptionis nostrae hic repetere et reliqua ad polum annectere. Figuram sumpsimus quae illi parti orbis maxime congruebat, quaeque situm et faciem terrarum qualis in sphaera esset, redderet. Quod ad descriptionem attinet, eam nos accepimus ex Itinerario Jacobi Cnoyen Buscoducensis, qui quaedam ex rebus gestis Arturi Britanni citat, majorem autem partem et potiora a sacerdote quodam apud regem Norvegiae anno Domini 1364 didicit. Descenderat is quinto gradu ex illis quos Arturus ad has habitandas insulas miserat, et referebat anno 1360 Minoritam quendam Anglum Oxoniensem mathematicum in eas insulas venisse, ipsique relictis ad ulteriora arte magica profectum descripsisse omnia, et astrolabio dimensum esse in hanc subjectam formam fere uti ex Jacobo collegimus. Euripos illos 4 dicebat tanto impetu ad interiorem voraginem rapi, ut naves semel ingressae nullo vento retroagi possint, neque vero unquam tantum ibi ventum esse ut molae frumentariae circumagendae sufficiat. Simillima his habet Giraldus Cambrensis in libro de mirabilibus Hiberniae; sic enim scribit: Non procul ab insulis (Ebudibus, Islandia etc.) ex parte boreali est maris quaedam miranda vorago, ad quam a remotis partibus omnes undique marini fluctus tanquam ex conducto confluunt et concurrunt, qui in secreta naturae penetralia se ibi transfundentes quasi in abyssum vorantur; si vero navem hanc forte transire contigerit, tanta rapitur et attrahitur fluctuum violentia, ut eam statim irrevocabiliter vis voracitatis absorbeat. | As our chart cannot be extended as far as the pole, for the degrees of latitude would finally attain infinity, and as we yet have a considerable portion at the pole itself to represent, we have deemed it necessary to repeat here the extremes of our representation and to join thereto the parts remaining to be represented as far as the pole. We have employed the figure (projection: Ed) which is most apt for this part of the world and which would render the positions and aspects of the lands as they are on the sphere. In the matter of the representation, we have taken it from the Travels of James Cnoyen of Bois le Duc, who quotes certain historical facts of Arthur the Briton but who gathered the most and the best information from a priest who served the King of Norway in the year of Grace 1364. He was a descendant in the fifth degree of those whom Arthur had sent to live in these isles; he related that, in 1360, an English minor friar of Oxford, who was a mathematician, reached these isles and then, having departed therefrom and having pushed on further by magical arts, he had described all and measured the whole by means of an astrolabe somewhat in the form hereunder which we have reproduced from James Cnoyen. He averred that the waters of these 4 arms of the sea were drawn towards the abyss with such violence that no wind is strong enough to bring vessels back again once they have entered; the wind there is, however, never sufficient to turn the arms of a corn mill. Exactly similar matters are related by Giraldus Cambrensis in his book on the marvels of Ireland. Thus he writes: "Not far from the isles (Hebrides, Iceland, etc.) towards the North there is a monstrous gulf in the sea towards which from all sides the billows of the sea coming from remote parts converge and run together as though brought there by a conduit; pouring into these mysterious abysses of nature, they are as though devoured thereby and, should it happen that a vessel pass there, it is seized and drawn away with such powerful violence of the waves that this hungry force immediately swallows it up never to appear again". |
| Legend 7 — Prima orbis circumnavigatio | First circumnavigation of the globe |
| Ferdinandus Magellanus anno Domini 1519 20 Septembris solvens ex Hispania, sequenti anno 21 Octobris ad fretum a se Magellanicum appellatum pervenit ac primus illud penetravit, inde Moluccas petiit, in Barussis insulis cum 8 Hispanis occisus est, reliqua classis lacera et mutila orbe deinceps circumnavigatio post triennium prope exactum in Hispaniam reversa est. | Ferdinand Magellan, sailing from Spain on 20 September of the year of Grace 1519, arrived on 21 October of the following year at the straits called after him the "Straits of Magellan" and was the first to enter them; thence he reached the Moluccas and was killed, with 8 Spaniards, in the Barusse Isles. The remainder of the fleet scattered and damaged, then returned to Spain. |
| Legend 8 — Quod Nigir in Nilum fluat | That the Niger flows into Nile |
| Nigirem fluvium cum reliquis in Libyae paludem fluentibus inde cum Gir fluvio continuari credimus, non solum nominis affinitate ducti, verum etiam partim quod tot tamque longe labentia flumina ab uno tandem lacu absoberi sine alia derivatione credibile non sit, partim, et quidem maxime, quod Solinus cap :30 et 33 Nili aquas inde produci ingenue afferat, ac latius id explicans cap:35 ex autoritate Punicorum librorum et traditione Jubae Mauritaniae regis dicat Nilum originem habere ex monte inferioris Mauritaniae qui oceano propinquat, eumque in Aegypto exundationis incrementa sentire, quando aut copiosior nix liquescens aut imbres largiores ab hac origine et Mauritaniae montibus defluxerint. Dicit autem bis eum per cuniculos subterraneos conspectum subterfugere, primum ubi e Nilide lacu effusus fuerit amplior mox e Caesariensi specu (ad Usargalam opinior montem) prorumpens, deinde iterum antequam Nigrim fluvium (qui Gir Ptolemeo dicitur) Africam ab Aethiopia sejungentem effundat. Tertio item absorberi et per subterranea e Nuba palude in aliud flumem erumpere indicat Ptolemeus lib:4 geogr: cap:6. Eadem fere quae, Solinus habet Plinio lib:5 cap9. | We had thought that the Niger River, with the other rivers which flow into the swamps of Libya, continues thence by the Gir River, not holding this opinion by the resemblance of the name only but also, partly, in that it is incredible that so many rivers which flow over so great distances should be finally absorbed by a single lake without being turned in some other direction, and partly also, above all, because Solinus, in chapters 30 and 33 states, without equivocation, that the waters of the Nile are thus formed and because, returning to the question in greater detail in chapter 5, relying on the authority of Carthaginian books and on the tradition of Juba, King of Mauritania, he says that the Nile has its source in a mountain of lower Mauritania near the Oceans and that its overflow is greater in Egypt when more copious melting snow or when more heavy falls of rain flow off from this source and from the mountains of Mauritania. He states, further, that at two places it disappears from view into subterranean channels, first when, having come from Lake Nilis, it grows larger from its exit from the Cesarian Grotto (which I assume to be near Mt. Usargala) and a second time before it joins the Niger River (which Ptolemy calls the Gir) which separates Africa from Ethiopia. Ptolemy says, in Bk. 4 of his Geography, chapter 6, that it loses itself yet a third time and that passing through subterranean channels coming from the Nuba swamp it rises again in another river. Pliny, in Bk. 5, chapt. 9 gives nearly the same information as Solinus. |
| Legend 9 — Anno Domini 1497 | In 1497 Vasco de Gama |
| Anno Domini 1497 primus Vasco de Gama superato 20 Novembris capite Bonae spei, et Africa circumnavigata Callicutium pervenit mandante Emanuele I rege Portogalliae 13. | In the year of Grace 1497 Vasco da Gama, for the first time, having doubled the Cape of Good Hope on 20 November and circumnavigated Africa, arrived at Callicut, sent by Emmanuel I, the 13th King of Portugal. |
| Legend 10 — Brevis usus Organi Directorii | Using the Directory of Courses |
| Cum inscriptionibus necessariis occupatus oceanus sufficientia directoria recipere nequat, et terra in qua eorundem non exiguus est usus nulla, coacti fuimus hoc Organum directorium addere, ut duorum quorumlibet locorum ad invicem respectus et habitudo inde peti possit. Debet autem prior locus, ad quem alterius respectum quaerimus, latitudinem notam habere, et in eadem sub primo Organi meridiano situs intelligi. Duo autem huic primo directoria applicuimus, quorum superius serviet cum prior locus majorem habet latitudinem, quam secundus, inferius cum minorem, ex utriusque centro filum dependeat. Quando igitur secundus locus longitudinis et latitudinis differentiam a priore notam habet, nota fient directio et distantia. Directio primum si notato situ secundi loci juxta longitudinis et latitudinis differentiam filum ex centro directorii ad aequidistantiam eorum locorum extendatur, parallelae enim lineae quaecunque in Organo ejusdem sunt directionis. Parallelas autem eadem circini extensio ex utroque loco in filum directa optime judicabit. Distantia deinde per modum alia tabella contentum invenietur. Si secundus locus directionem cum differentia alterutra longitudinis vel latitudinis notam habuerit, ad eam directionem filum extendatur et ex priori loco circini ductu illa parallela linea fingatur, quae ubi notam differentiam compleverit, etiam distantiam notam faciet juxta rationem in alia tabella descriptam. Si secundus locus directionem et distantiam a primo notas habuerit, innotescent etiam differentiae latitudinis et longitudinis: Quaeratur directio eandem ab aequatore declinationem habens, quam locorum direction a meridiano, et in eadem a centro directionum tot gradus aequatoris mensurentur quot locorum distantia exigit, tum meridianus eos gradus terminans in aequatore quoque gradus differentiae latitudinis a centro directionum computandos terminabit. Hos si addas priori loco in minori latitudine existenti, aut demas ab eodem in majore posito, prodibit latitudo secundi loci, ad quam e priore loco educta directio etiam longitudinis differentiam notabit, inde videlicet ad aequidistantiam a proximo meridiano in aequatorem descendendo. Plura majoraque de hoc Organo in Geographia nostra deo volente dabimus. | As the Ocean, being covered by the necessary inscriptions, cannot contain a sufficiency of compass roses and as the land, where they would have been most useful, cannot hold any, we have been constrained to add this diagram of courses to be used to obtain the respective situations of any two places with reference to each other. The latitude of the first place, the position of which with reference to the other is sought, must be noted and it must be understood to be placed in this latitude on the first meridian of the diagram. Now we have applied two compass roses to this first meridian, the upper one of which is to be used when the latitude of the first place is greater than that of the second and the lower when its latitude is less; a thread should be fixed to the centre of each of them. If then the differences of longitude and latitude between the first and second places are known, the direction and the distance can be found. First the direction if, after the position of the second place has been fixed according to the differences of longitude and latitude, the thread be stretched from the centre of the rose so as to lie equidistant from the two places; all parallel lines drawn on the diagram are, in fact, lines of the same direction. A fixed span of a pair of compasses, laid off from each place to the thread will indicate the parallel perfectly. The distance may be found thereafter by the method set out in another frame. If the direction of the second place be known, together with its difference either of longitude or of latitude from the first, the thread should be stretched in this direction and, the compasses being moved along it starting from the first place, the line parallel thereto can be imagined; this line, as soon as it reaches a point at the known difference of longitude or latitude, will give the distance by the method set forth in another frame. Should the direction and the distance of the second place with reference to the first be known, the differences of latitude and of longitude also may be found. The direction is sought which has the same inclination to the equator as that which joins the two places has to the meridian and from the centre of the directions as many degrees of the equator as there are in the distance between the two places are measured along this direction; then the meridian which is the limit of these degrees will delimit also, on the equator, the number of degrees in the difference of latitude, counting from the centre of directions. By adding these to the first place if the latitude be the lesser or by subtracting them from the same place if it be the greater, the latitude of the second place is obtained, the direction to which from the first place will give also the difference of longitude, naturally measuring on the equator a distance equal to that of the nearest meridian. God willing, we will give more and greater information on this diagram in our Geography. |
| Legend 11 — De Meridianae Continentis | On the Southern Continent |
| De Meridianae Continentis ad Javam Majorem accessu. Ludovicus Vartomannus lib : 3 Indiae cap : 27 refert a latere meridiano Javae majoris versus austrum gentes esse quasdam quae syderibus nostro septentrioni obversis navigant, idque eousque donec diem 4 horarum inveniant, hoc est in 63 gradum latitudinis atque haec ex ore naucleri sui Indi refert. Marcus Paulus Venetus autem coram hujus continentis provincias aliquot et insulas vidit, ac distantias annotavit usque ad Javam minorem, quam neque Burneo insulam, neque aliquam majori Javae orientalem esse (ut varie plerique opinantur) ex eo certissimo constat, quod illam ait usque adeo in austrum declinare, ut neque polus arcticus neque stella ejus, hoc est ursa minor, videri possint et cap : 16 dicit in uno ejus regno quod Samara dicitur neutram ursam videri, quare considerato ambitu insulae, quem ait 2000 miliarum esse, certum est borealem ejus terminum 20 ut minimum gradum latitudinis australis superare. Colligimus ergo continemtem australem longe versus septentrionem excurrere et fretum quoddam cum Java majore efficere, cui Johannes Mandevillanus, autor licet alioqui fabulosus, in situ tamen locorum non contemnendus, consentit cap : 108 mare Rubrum juxta Taprobanam et adjacentes regiones atque insulas ab Oceano orientali secludi inquiens [25°S | 130°O] | On the approach from the Southern Continent to Java Major. Ludovico di Varthema, in Bk.3, on India, Chapt.27, reports that on the southern side of Java Major, to the southward, there are peoples who sail with their backs to our stars of the north until they find a day of but 4 hours, i.e. to the 63rd. degree of latitude and he refers to this as coming from the mouth of his Indian pilot. As for Marco Polo, the Venetian, he saw opposite this continent some provinces and several islands and he noted the distances to Java Minor, which, according to him, is evidently neither the isle of Borneo nor some island lying to the eastward of Java Major (as most do variously think) for he says that it runs so far to the southward that neither the arctic pole nor its stars, i.e. the Little Bear, may be seen therefrom; and, in chapt.16, he states that in one of its Kingdoms, called Samara, neither of the two Bears can be seen; therefore, considering the circumference of the island, which he states to be 2,000 miles, it is certain that its northern extremity goes beyond at least the 20th degree of southern latitude. Thus we conclude, therefrom, that the Southern continent extends far to the northward and makes, with Java Major, a strait; John Mandeville, an author who, though he relates some fables, is not to be disregarded as concerns the positions of places, is of the same opinion when he declares, in chapter 108, that the Red Sea is separated from the Eastern Ocean near Taprobana and the neighbouring regions and isles. |
| Legend 12 — Distantiae locorum mensurandae modus | Manner of measuring the distances of places |
| Aliud nobis est plaga, aliud directio distinctionis rerum causa. Plagam vocamus nostri loci ad alterum respectum secundum declinationem circuli maximi per utrumque locum ducti ab aliquo 4 punctorum cardinalium. Sic dicimus locum aliquem nobis esse boreozephyrium, id est nordwestium, quando circulus maximus a nobis per eum ductus 45 gradus in horizonte declinat a septentrionali cardine versus occidentalem. Directionem vocamus lineam ab uno loco in alium sic ductam, ut cum quibusvis meridianis aequales angulos faciat, haec perpetuo oblique incurvatur in superficie sphaerae propter meridianorum ad se invicem inclinationem, atque inde in magnis distantiis, et potissimum circa borealiores partes distantia directionalis semper major est distantia plagali, in mediocribus vero, et maxime versus aequatorem sitis, non est notablis differentia, quare cum plagales distantiae sumendae circa aequatorem non excedunt 20 gradus maximi circuli, aut in climate Hispaniae et Galliae 15 gradus: aut in partibus septentrionalibus Europae et Asiae 8 vel 10, convenienter directionalibus distantiis pro plagalibus sive rectis utemur, alioqui et harum inquirendarum ratio tradi potest, sed operosior nec admodum necessaria. Distantiae ergo directionalis sic invenientur. Consideretur quo nomine appelletur linea imaginaria inter duos locos extensa, hoc est cui in tabula scriptae lineae sit parallela, quod per circinum ex utroque loco in eandem lineam extenso explorabitur, deinde quae sit differentia latitudinis eorundem locorum, quae invenietur distantiam cujusque a proximo parallelo latitudinis in scalam graduum latitudinis transferendo; his duobus inventis quaeratur in aliquo directorio aequinoctiali imposito linea eodem angulo declinans ab aequinoctiali, quo linea imaginaria propositorum locorum a meridiano alterutrius, et a centro directorii computatis tot gradibus aequatoris quot erant in differentia latitudinis, ab extremo graduum ad proximum meridianum distentus circinus deorsum feratur altero pede semper eundem meridianum occupante, reliquo vero eundem aequidistanter comitante donec in inventam declinationis lineam incidat, ibi tum iste figatur, ille qui meridiano inhaerebat extendantur in centrum directorii, sic distentus circinus utroque pede aequatori applicetur, ac tum gradus intercepti indicabunt directionalem propositorum locorum distantiam, multiplicando numerum graduum per 15 si germanica miliaria quaerantur, per 60 si italica, per 20 gallica aut hispania communia. Haec distantiae inquirendae ratio per se quidem semper infallibilis est, sed in iis directionibus quae maxime ad parallelum latitudinis inclinantur incertior est circini applicatio propter nimis obliquam directionalium linearum incidentiam in parallelos, ideoque in his alter hic modus erit exactior. Sumetur circino assumptorum locorum, et observando quot gradus ibidem circinus intercipiat, sic distentus ex uno loco versus alterum toties revolvatur quoties intercapedo locorum suspicere potest, si quid residuum est distantiae quod ad integram circini extensionem non perveniat id contractior circinus excipiet, et in medios gradus differentiae latitudinis traducetur, notatisque ibi intercepis gradibus colligentur omnium revolutionum gradus cum residuo in unam summam, qua ut mox diximus multiplicata provenient iliaria distantiae quaesitae. | A distinction must be made between plaga (orthodrome or great circle: Ed) and directio (loxodrome or rhumb line: Ed) which are two different things. We call plaga the line of sight from our position to another, which is defined by the angle between the great circle passing through the two places and any one of the four cardinal points. Thus we say that, for us, a place is "boreozephyrius", i.e. to the northwest, when the great circle drawn through us and that place lies in the horizontal plane at 45 degrees from north towards the west. We call the line drawn from one place to another in such a way that it cuts every meridian at a constant angle, directio; this line is always recurved obliquely on the surface of the sphere on account of the inclination of the meridians with reference to each other; thus, at great distances and particularly in more northern Regions, the "directional" distance is always greater than the "plagal" distance, but for short distances, and particularly in equatorial regions, there is no noticeable difference. Hence, when the plagal distances which are to be measured in the vicinity of the equator do not exceed 20 degrees of a great circle, or 15 degrees near Spain and France, or 8 and even 10 degrees in the northern parts of Europe and Asia, it is convenient to use directional distances instead of plagal or direct distances; another method to obtain them could be given but it is more laborious and is not absolutely necessary. Therefore, directional distances are found thus. Let the name which should be applied (rhumb line: Ed) to the imaginary line between the two places be considered, i.e. to which straight line drawn on the chart it is parallel; this can be found by extending a pair of compasses from each point to one of the straight lines; next, what is the difference of latitude between these points? This may be found by transferring the distance of each point from the nearest parallel of latitude to the scale of degrees of latitude. When these two elements have been found, a line is sought, on one of the compass roses on the equator, which is inclined to the equator at the same angle as the imaginary line, which joins the two points under consideration, makes with their respective meridians; from the centre of the rose a number of degrees of the equator equal to the number of degrees in the difference of the latitudes is measured. The compasses are then opened from the last of these degrees and the nearest meridian and are moved with one point remaining on this meridian and the other accompanying it at a constant distance until it reaches the line which has the required inclination. This point of the compasses is then held in place and the other, which had moved on the meridian, is extended to the centre of the rose. With this extension the compasses are transferred to the equator and the number of degrees between the points gives the directional distance between the places considered, the number of degrees being multiplied by 15 if German miles are required, by 60 if they be Italian miles and by 20 if they be the common French or Spanish miles. This method for obtaining the distance is indeed always infallible in principle, but, when the directions are greatly inclined to the parallels of latitude, the point of application of the compasses is less determinate on account of the too oblique incidence of the lines of the rose to the parallels; then the following method is more accurate. With the compasses set at the difference of latitude between the places in question, the number of degrees contained therein being noted, the compasses are run from one place to the other by such number of revolutions as the distance between the two places permits; the distance which may remain and which will be less than the span set on the compasses, is measured by closing them to it and reading this length on the scale of degrees between the two latitudes; this intercepted number of degrees is noted and is added to the number of degrees in all the revolutions of the compasses, thus obtaining a single total by means of which the number of miles in the distance sought may be found by multiplying, as indicated above. |
| Legend 13 — Anno 1493 ... Alexander Pontifex | 1493 arbitration of Pope Alexander |
| Anno 1493 cum iam longinquae navigationis studium per contentionem ferveret inter Castellanos et Portugallenses, Alexander Pontifex limitem statuit meridianum circulum 100 leucis distantem a qualibet insularum capitis Viridis et earum quas vocant Acores, qui utriusque partis navigationes et conquirendi jura determinaret, occiduum orbem Castellanis, orientalem Portogallensibus determinans. Retractato autem hoc limite ab utrisque propter incidentes altercationes anno 1524, constitutus est communis limes meridianus 370 leucis in occasum distans ab insula Sancti Antonii Gorgadum occidentalissima. | In 1493, when the Spaniards and the Portuguese were in ardent competition in long sea voyages, Pope Alexander fixed, as the limit to determine the rights of navigation and of conquest of the two parties, the meridian circle distant by 100 leagues from any of the Cape Verd Islands or from those known as the Azores, attributing the western side to the Spaniards and the eastern side to the Portuguese. The two parties having rejected this limit on account of altercations which arose in 1524, the meridian lying 370 leagues to the westward of the isle of San Antonio, the most westerly of the Gorgades, was taken as the common boundary. |
| Legend 14 — De vero Gangis | On the Ganges |
| De vero Gangis et Aureae Chersonesi situ. Ea quae longa experientia discuntur si ad perfectam veritatis cognitionem progredi non autem falsitate obscurari debeant sic instituenda sunt, ut castigatis quae per manifestas rationes falsa sunt, probabilia retineantur, donec experientiae et ratiocinationes omnes inter se consentaneae res ipsas in sua veritate ob oculos ponant, talis est geographia, quam, si volumus veterum inventa temere quavis occasione transponere, commutare aut invertere, non modo non perficiemus, sed pro unius erroris emendatione centum veritates depravabimus et confusissimam tandem terrarum et nominum congeriem faciemus, in qua nec regiones suis locis nec nomina suis regionibus reponantur, quale quid hodie in Indiae descriptione sit a geographis, dum nimis absurde Gangem celebratissimum fluvium occidentalior faciunt Cincapura promontorio et Taprobana, qui veteribus multo fuit orientaliter, atque universam deinceps Indiae descriptionem, quae apud Ptolomeum est, invertunt et confundunt, nihil illi ultra dictum promontorium concedentes, quod in primis nobis refellendum est, quo Ptolomeo sua stet autoritas et geographica veritas eruatur, quae non minus vera nomina quam veros locorum situs postulat. Ac primum constat eam descriptionem non obiter a Ptolomeo congestam esse, sed inde usque ab Alexandro Magno multorum terra marique profectionibus, multorum observationibus hanc figuram accepisse, et emendatius collectam a Marino, integritatique a Ptolomeo restitutam, quare cum tot saeculis totque artificibus elaborata sit, non est possibile tam enormiter a vero recedere, ut tam longi littoris transpositione fallat, neque enim poterat tantarum littoris partium, quantae sunt a Comara promontorio ad Taprobanam adjacensque ei promontorium, ac dehinc ad Gangem et Auream, neque tam frequentatarum (ut copiosa locorum inscriptio arguit) consequentia ignorari, ut quae prior erat posterior poneretur, et Ganges longo intervallo Taprobanam sequeretur, qui (ut nostri volunt) multo antecedere debebat. In directionum cursu falli poterant veteres propter navigandi artem adhuc imperfectam, et quod neglectis fere directionibus littora soleant legi. In articularium itidem locorum transpositione errare poterant, at sane in hujusmodi quam diximus consequentia nequaquam. Arrianus gravis autor in Periplo veritatis nobis judex est, cui ab Indo in meridiem est Comara unde juxta consequentiam littorum per Colchos, Camaram Poducam et Sopatmam pervenit in Taprobanam et adjacentem illi regionem Azaniam, ubi nunc Malacha est nostris, et Ptolomeo, Mesolus fluvius, Arrino item Mazalia regio; postea per Desarenam Cirradas, Bargisos, Hippoprosopos demum ad Gangem fluvium et emporium pertingit. Ad haec via regia stadiorum 20 000, quae est ab Indo ad Gangem et Palibotram apud Strabonem lib.15 non alio loco Gangem admittet, quam quo nos eum cum Ptolomeo posuimus. Non enim intimus recessus Bengalici sinus, quo hodie veterum Gangem transferunt, eousque elongari ab Indo potest servatis directionibus et earum dimensionibus, ut propositam distantiam Palibotra Gangi imposita servet, simul perpenso quod Ganges a Palibotra orientem versus mare petat. Jam si consideremus 38 dierum iter quod Nicolaus de Conti Venetus confecit ab intimo inu Bengalico, et Avam fluvium, ad quem pervenit, multo majorem Guenga Bengalico, non inepte judicabimus eum ad maximum Indiae fluminum celebratissimumque verteribus Gangem pervenisse, quanquam alio forte ibi nomine vocatum, Avam quoque urbem eidem fluvio adjacentem credibile erit Palibotram esse cum ob magnitudinem, ut quae 15 miliarium ambitu patet, tum ob convenientem ab ostiis distantiam, 17 enim diebus enavigavit Nicolaus, cum 6000 stadiorum ponat Strabo. Et sane cum eo loco que nos signavimus situm fontes Guengae Bengalici, idemque quem posuimus ipsius decursus, ut Joannem de Barros testem habemus, quid absurdius dici poterat quam hunc esse veterum illum Gangem, cujus fontes constat iisdem montibus quibus Indum ortos, et 280 mil:pass: tantum a Zaradro orientalissimo Indum augentium fluvio Plinio test distare, tum etiam magna parte in meridiem ferri? Quare cum neque fontes Guengae, neque situs, neque longitudo ipsius veterum descriptioni conveniat, hunc esse veterum Gangem negamus, tametsi nomen ejus referre videatur. Quinimo nec ipsi qui ejus opinionis autores fuerunt suae sententiae confidenter stare videntur, cum alterum finxerint Gangem iisdem cum Guenga ostiis se in Bengalicum sinum exonerantem, ipsa nimirum dislocatione eos redarguente. Adde quod oppida aliquot et Moin sive Mien aut Mein regnum huic fluvio, quem nos Gangem esse defendimus, debita ad suum quoque fictitium Gangem transtulerint, quo perspicue intelligi datur verum illlum et veterum Gangem alibi quam in sinu Bengalico quaerendum esse. Praeter solidas quoque istas rationes vel figura ipsa littorum et nomina passim inscripta veritatem ostendere poterant, Comari enim promontorium et nostri cum Ptolomeo atque Arriano ponunt, tum cabo de Colle quid aluid sonat quam Collaicum Ptolomei aut Colchicum Arriani? Quid consonantius quam Jameri et Chaberis sive Camara, Pogu vel Pegu et Poduca, Tavay et Tava, Malanga et Malaca, Cantan et Gange oppidum cum fluvio maximo qualem veteres quoque Gangem testantur? Denique, si hic non est Ganges ubi posuimus, quo referentur tot insulae in sinu Gangetico a Ptolomeo positae, cum in Bengalico sinu non reperiantur? Tenemus ergo Cantan maximum fluvium esse Gangem a veteribus celebratum, et Auream ess non quae nunc Malaca est, sed Japan insulam, ut ex Arriano et Mela liquet, tametsi peninsulam faciat Ptolomeus, apud quem et Sabana emporium hodiernum insulae nomen videtur obtinere, Marcus Paulus Venetus lib : 3. cap : 2. dicit eam convenienter antiquo nomini suo auro abundantissimam esse. Praeterea insulam Burneo esse quae Ptolomeo Bonae fortunae, Celebes, Ambon et Gilolo esse quae Sindae appellantur, Mindanao cum vicinis 4 majoribus Barussas vocari refellere non possumus. Nomina item quaedam in recentioribus tabulis invenio quae Mangi et Cathaium regna Ptolomeo cognita fuisse manifeste doceant, et ad sinum Magnum quem Plinius Chrysen vocat pertinere, ut sunt in Mangi regno Pagrasa, Done, Caracaran, Agonara, Tartaho, in Cathaio autem Aspicia et Brema, quibus apud Ptolomaeum respondent Pagrasa, Daona, Lariagara, Aganagara, Coracha, Aspithara, Bramma, ut dubium nullum sit Gangem Taprobana orientaliorem esse, recteque deinceps Chrysen, insulam et sinum Magnum sequi, ultra quae Cattigara Sinarum statio postremus Ptolomaicae descriptionis terminus orientalem nostrae continentis extremitatem possidere, et in regnum, quod hodie Tenduch vocatur, incidere videtur. | On the true positions of the Ganges and the Golden Chersonese. That which long experience teaches, in order to advance with the object of a perfect knowledge of truth and not to be blinded by error, should be so established that, after discarding all which obvious reasons reveal to be false, that which is probable is retained until, every test and every reasoning being in agreement, the facts themselves in their very truth are placed before the eyes. It is so in geography. Should we, at the first incidental occasion, transpose, modify or discard the discoveries of the ancients, not only will we not improve but, by correcting a single error we will alter a hundred truths and, in the end, we will have an extremely confused mass of lands and names in which neither the parts will appear under their true names nor the names on their proper parts. Somewhat in this fashion has been done today by geographers in the map of India, in that, most absurdly, they place this very celebrated River Ganges further west than the promontory of Singapore and than Taprobana, though, according to the ancients, it lay much further to the eastward; then, also, they upset and confound the whole map of India, as given by Ptolemy, by not allotting to it anything beyond the said promontory. But we must most strongly rebut this opinion in order that Ptolemy's authority be not shaken and that the geographical truth be made manifest, which truth requires no less accuracy in the names than in the positions of places. And it is most clearly evident that the representation was not compiled in a superficial manner by Ptolemy but that it received the form which has been given to it since the time of Alexander the Great thanks to the expeditions of numerous travellers by land and sea and to many observations and that it had been corrected by Marinus and entirely restored by Ptolemy. Hence, since it is the result of the labour of so many centuries and so many workers, it is impossible that it should so hugely vary from the truth and that it should be false by the displacement of a coast of such great extent. And verily the succession could not be unknown of parts of the shore, on the one hand, as considerable as those which extend from Comara Promontory as far as Taprobana, and the adjacent headland and thence as far as the Ganges and the Golden Chersonese and, on the other hand, so greatly frequented (as is proved by the abundance of the names of places inscribed thereon), to the extent that that which is before could be placed after and that the Ganges, which (according to these men) should come a long way before, should have been placed a great distance after Taprobana. In laying down directions the ancients might well be wrong on account of the imperfection which then vitiated the art of navigation and because, direction being almost disregarded, they were accustomed to hug the shores. Likewise they might err by the transposition of particular places but, of a truth, they could not mistake the order of the positions of which we have spoken. Arrian, who was a thorough writer, clearly shows us the truth in his Periplus. According to him, starting from the Indus, Comara is to the Southward, thence, taking the coasts in succession by Colchos, Camara, Poduca and Sopatma, he arrives at Taprobana and in the adjacent region of Azania, which for us is now Malacca, for Ptolemy the river Mesclus and for Arrian the region of Mazalia; hence by Desarena, the Cirrades, the Bargises and the Hippoprosopes finally he reaches the river and the emporium of Ganges. And, further, the Royal Road of 20,000 stadia, which runs from the Indus to the Ganges and Palibotra, according to Strabo, Bk. 15, would not permit the Ganges to be placed elsewhere than where we, with Ptolemy, have put it. In fact, the most deeply indented part of the Bay of Bengal, to which the old Ganges is transferred today, cannot be sufficiently distant from the Indus, if the directions and their dimensions be maintained, for Palibotra, situated on the Ganges, to be at the stated distance, taking into consideration at the same time that the Ganges, from Palibotra, flows towards the sea in an Easterly direction. And again, if we consider the journey of 38 days, which the Venetian Nicolas de Conti made from the head of the Bay of Bengal, and the Ava River, at which he arrived, which was much greater than the Guenga of Bengal, we may deem with sufficient reason that be reached the Ganges, the greatest of the rivers of India and that which was best known to the ancients, even though, there, it were known by another name; it is even likely that the city of Ava, nigh unto this river, may be Palibotra, not only on account of its greatness – for the city has a compass of 15 miles – but also for its distance from the mouth, which is in close accord; actually Nicolas sailed for 17 days thereon to reach the sea whilst Strabo speaks of a distance of 6000 stadia. And, truly, since the sources of the Guenga of Bengal are in the parts where we have placed them and as its course is that which we show, as witnesses Jodo de Barros, what more absurd could be said than that this be the Ganges of the ancients, of which it is shown that the sources are in the same mountains as those of the Indus and that it is but 280 paces distant from the River Zaradrus, the most easterly of the tributaries of the Indus according to the testimony of Pliny, and, yet again, that, over a large part of its course, it runs to the southward. Therefore, since neither the sources of the Guenga, nor its position, nor its length are in accord with the descriptions of the ancients, we deny that this is the Ganges of the ancients though its name may appear to refer thereto. Still more, those who were the authors of this opinion do not seem to maintain their position with confidence when they imagined another Ganges falling into the Bay of Bengal by the same mouth as the Guenga, this displacement alone being sufficient to refute their argument. If to this be added that they have transferred several towns and the kingdom of Moin or Mien, or Mein, which are connected with this river which we hold to be the Ganges, to their fictitious Ganges, it will be clearly understood that this true Ganges, which is also the Ganges of the ancients, must be sought elsewhere than in the Bay of Bengal. Besides these valid reasons, the shapes of the coasts themselves and the names which appear nearly everywhere would show the truth. Our geographers, in fact, place the headland of Comara as do Ptolemy and Arrian; besides, has not the name Cabo de Colle the same sound as the Collaicum of Ptolemy or the Colchicum of Arrian? Is there anything which is nearer than Jameri and Chaberis or Camara, Pogu or Pegu and Poduca, Tavay and Tava, Malanga and Mallacca, Cantan and the town of Gange with the very great river which the ancients also attest to be the Ganges? Finally, if the Ganges be not there where we have placed it, to whither shall so many isles placed by Ptolemy in the Gangetic Gulf be referred, since they are not in the Bay of Bengal? We maintain therefore that the very great river Cantan is the celebrated Ganges of the ancients and that the Golden Chersonese is not that which is now Malacca but the isle of Japan, as is clearly evident from the texts of Arrian and of Mela, though Ptolemy makes it a peninsula, but in Ptolemy the present emporium of Sabana seems also to be called an island. Marco Polo, of Venice, says, in Bk.3, chapt.2, that, consistently with its ancient name, it abounds greatly in gold. Besides we are obliged to admit that the island of Borneo is that which Ptolemy calls the isle of Good Fortune, that Celebes, Ambon and Gilolo are those which are called Sindes and that Mindanao and the neighbouring 4 great islands are called the Barusses. Likewise I find, on some fairly recent charts, certain names which manifestly indicate that Ptolemy knew of the kingdoms of Mangi and Cathay and the Great Gulf which Pliny says extends to Chryse, such as in the kingdom of Mangi, Pagrasa, Done, Caracaran, Agonara, and Tartaho, and in the kingdom of Cathay Aspicia and Brema, to which, in Ptolemy, Pagrasa, Daona, Lariagara, Aganagara, Cortacha, Aspithara and Bramma correspond, thus there is no doubt but that the Ganges lies more to the eastward than Taprobana and that, thereafter, it flows straight towards the isle of Chryse and the Sinus Magnus beyond which Cattigara, a station of the Sinae, the extreme limit of the Ptolomaean chart, appears to lie at the extremity of our continent and to coincide with the kingdom now called Tenduch. |
| Legend 15 — Cautum est privilegio | Copyright |
| Caesareae Majestatis ne quis in Imperio aut Regnis provinciisque ejus hereditariis intra annos 14 hoc opus ullo modo recudat aut alibi recusum eodem inferat. Idem quoque ne fiat in Belgio per annos 10 Regiae Majestatis mandato prohibetur. Aeditum autem est opus hoc Duysburgi anno Domini 1569 mense Augusto. | By prerogative of His Imperial Majesty all whomsoever in the Empire or in His hereditary Kingdoms and provinces, are restrained for a period of 14 years from reproducing this work in any manner whatsoever or to introduce it therein should it have been reproduced elsewhere. The same restraint has been promulgated by an edict of His Royal Majesty for a period of 10 years in Belgium. This work was published at Duisburg in the year of Grace 1569 in the month of August. |

=== Minor texts ===
| Sheet 1 | | |
| 75°N,182°E | Polus magnetis. Hunc altero fine tabulae in sua latitudine repetitum vides, quemadmodum et reliquas descriptiones extremitates, quae hoc tabulae latus finiunt, quod ideo factum est ut utriusque termini ad alterum continuato clarius oculis subjecta esset. | Magnetic Pole. Ye see it repeated at the other end of the chart in the proper latitude as also the other extremities of the representation which terminate at this side of the chart; this was done in order that the continuity of each of the two ends with the other shall more clearly be set before your eyes. |
| 75°N,205°E | Deserta regio et plana in qua equi sylvestres sunt plurimi, et oves item sylvestres, quales Boethus in descriptione regni Scotiae narrat esse in una Hebridum insularum. | Desert and flat region in which are very many wild horses and also wild sheep such as Boece declares, in his description of the kingdom of Scotland, are to be found in one of the isles of the Hebrides. |
| Sheet 2 | | |
| 64°N,275°E | Hic mare est dulcium aquarum, cujus terminum ignorari Canadenses ex relatu Saguenaiensium aiunt. | Here is the sea of sweet waters, of which, according to the report of the inhabitants of Saguenai, the Canadians say that the limits are unknown. |
| 56°N,290°E | Hoc fluvio facilior est navigatio in Saguenai. | By this river navigation towards Saguenai is easier. |
| Sheet 3 | | |
| 70°N,300°E | Anno Domini 1500 Gaspar Corterealis Portogalensis navigavit ad has terras sperans a parte septentrionali invenire transitum ad insulas Moluccas, perveniens autem ad fluvium quem a devectis nivibus vocant Rio nevado, propter ingens frigus altius in septentrionem pergere destitit, perlustravit autem littora in meridiem usque ad C. Razo. | In the year of Our Lord 1500 Gaspar Corte-Real, a Portuguese, sailed towards these lands hoping to find, to the Northward, a passage towards the Molucca Isles, but coming near the river which, on account of the snow which it carries in its course, is called Rio Nevado, he abandoned the attempt to advance further North on account of the great cold, but followed the shore Southward as far as Cape Razo. |
| 70°N,300°E | Anno 1504 Britones primi ioveoerunt littora novae Franciae circa ostia sinus S. Laurentii. | In the year 1504 some Bretons first discovered the shores of New France about the mouth of the Gulf of Saint Lawrence. |
| 70°N,300°E | Anno 1524 Joannes Verrazzanus Florentinus nomine regis Gall: Francisci primi ex portu Diepa profectus 17 Martii ad littus meridionale novae Fraciae pervenit circa 34 gradum latitud: atque inde versus orientem omne littus perlustravit usque ad Britonum promontorium. | In the year 1524 the Florentine, Giovanni Verrazzano, sailed in the name of the King of France, Francis I, on 17 March from the port of Dieppe, reached the south coast of New France in about the 34th degree of latitude and thence followed the whole coast to the eastward as far as the Cape of the Bretons. |
| 70°N,300°E | Anno 1534 duce classis Jacobo Cartier lustrata fuit nova Francia et proximo anno regi Galliae conquiri coepit. | In the year 1534, Jacques Cartier being leader of the fleet, New France was examined and, in the following year, its conquest for the King of France was undertaken. |
| 75°N,335°E | Groclant insula cujus incolae Suedi sunt origine. | Isle of Groclant the inhabitants of which are Swedes by origin. |
| 64°N,355°E | Hekelfort prom: perpetuo fumos saepe etiam flammas eructans | Hekelfort Promontory which continually vomits forth smoke and frequently even flames. |
| 58°N,345°E | Drogeo, Dus Cimes Callis. | Drogeo, the Dus Cimes of the French. |
| Sheet 4 | | |
| 73°N,48°E | Semes saxum et promontorium, quod praetereuntes nautae projecto munere pacant ne tempestate obruantur. | The rock and promontory of Semes, which the seamen who double it appease by casting presents to it, in order that they shall not be victims of tempests. |
| 73°N,52°E | Swentinoz hoc est sacrum promontorium. Charybdis singulis sex horis aquas absorbeus ac magno cum sonitu revomens. | Swentinoz, that is the Sacred Promontory. Charybdis which every six hours engulfs the waters and then casts them forth with a terrible clamour. |
| Sheet 5 | | |
| 70°N,95°E | Camenon poyas, hoc est orbis terrae cingulum mons, Hyperboreus veteribus, Riphaeus Plinio. | Camenon poyas, that is the mountain which serves as a belt for the Universe, the Hyperboreas of the ancients and the Ripheus of Pliny. |
| 68°N,115°E | Lytarnis primum Celticae promont: Plinio. | Lytarmis, according to Pliny, the first promontory of Celtica. |
| 62°N,112°E | Samogedi id est se mutuo comedentes. | Samogeds, that is the people who devour each other. |
| 60°N,105°E | Oby fluvius sesquidiei remigatione latus. | The River Oby the width of which is such that a day and a half is required to cross it in a rowing boat. |
| 59°N,105°E | Perosite ore angusto, odore coctae carnis vitam sustentant. | Perosite, with narrow mouths, who live on the odour of roast flesh. |
| 66°N,105°E | Per hunc sinum mare Caspium erumpere crediderunt Strabo, Dionysius poeta, Plinius, Solinus et Pomponius Mela, fortasse lacu illo non exiguo, qui Obi fluvium effundit, opinionem suggerente. | Strabo, the poet Dionysius, Pliny, Solinus and Pomponius Mela believed that the Caspian Sea opened out into this gulf, this idea being suggested perhaps by the somewhat vast lake from which the Obi River flows. |
| Sheet 6 | | |
| 78°N,130°E | In septentrionalibus partibus Bargu insulae sunt, inquit M. Paulus Ven: lib.1, cap.61, quae tantum vergunt ad aquilonem, ut polus arcticus illis videatur ad meridiem deflectere. | In the northern parts of Bargu there are islands, so says Marco Polo, the Venetian, Bk.1, chap.61, which are so far to the north that the Arctic pole appears to them to deviate to the southward. |
| 77°N,175°E | Hic erit polus maguetis, si meridianus per insulam Corvi primus dici debeat. | It is here that the magnetic pole lies if the meridian which passes through the Isle of Corvo be considered as the first. |
| 72°N,170°E | Hic polum magnetis esse et perfectissimum magnetem qui reliquos ad se trahat certis rationibus colligitur, primo meridiano quem posui concesso . | From sure calculations it is here that lies the magnetic pole and the very perfect magnet which draws to itself all others, it being assumed that the prime meridian be where I have placed it. |
| 68°N,170°E | Hic in monte collocati sunt duo tubicines aerei, quos verisimile est Tartarorum in perpetuam vindicatae libertatis memoriam eo loci posuisse, qua per summos montes in tutiora loca commigrarunt. | At this place, on a mountain, are set two flute-players in bronze who probably were put here by the Tartars as an everlasting memorial of the attainment of their freedom at the place at which, by crossing some very high mountains, they entered countries where they found greater safety. |
| 59°N,160°E | Tenduc regnum in quo Christiani ex posteritate Presbiteri Joannis regnabant tempore M. Pauli Ven: anno D. I290. | The Kingdom of Tenduc over which Christian descendants of Prester John reigned in the time of Messer Polo, the Venetian, in the year 1280. |
| Sheet 7 | | |
| °N,°E | Nova Guinea quae ab Andrea Corsali Florentino videtur dici Terra de piccinacoli. Forte Iabadii insula est Ptolomeo si modo insula est, nam sitne insula an pars continentis australis ignotum adhuc est. | New Guinea which seemingly was called by Andrea Corsalis, the Florentine, the Land of the Dwarfs. Perchance it is the Isle of Jabadiu of Ptolemy if it really be an isle, for it is not yet known whether it be an isle or a part of the Southern Continent. |
| °N,°E | Insulae duae infortunatae, sic a Magellano appellatae, quod nec homines nec victui apta haberent. | The two Unfortunate Isles, so called by Magellan, for that they held neither men nor victuals. |
| Sheet 9 | | |
| 28°N,315°E | Anno D. 1492, 11 Octobris Christophorus Columbus novam Indian nomine regis Castellae detexit, prima terra quam conquisivit fuit Haiti. | In the year of Our Lord 1492 on 11 October Christopher Columbus, in the name of the King of Castille, discovered the New Indies. The first land conquered by him was Haiti. |
| 8°N,275°E | Maranon fluvius inventus fuit a Vincentio Yanez Pincon an: 1499, et an: 1542 totus a foutibus fere, ad ostia usque navigatus a Francisco Oregliana leucis 1660, mensibus 8, dulces in mari servat aquas usque ad 40 leucas. | The River Maranon was discovered by Vicente Yáñez Pinzón in 1499, and in 1542 it was descended in its entirety, almost from its sources to its mouth, by Francisco Oregliana, over a course of 1,660 leagues during 8 months. It maintains its sweet waters in the sea for 40 leagues from the coast. |
| 12°S,350°E | Portus regalis in quem Franci et Britanni mercatum navigant. | Port Royal to which the French and the English repair for trade. |
| Sheet 11 | | |
| 55°N,110°E | Care desertum per quod in Cathaium eunt ac redeunt Tartari. | The desert of Cara by which the Tartars pass when going to Cathay or returning therefrom. |
| 52°N,115°E | Karakithay id est nigra Kathaya. | Karakithai, that is to say Black Cathay. |
| 40°N,115°E | Pamer altissima pars totius continentis. M. Paul Ven : lib.5 | Pamer, the highest part of the whole continent, M. Polo, the Venetian, Bk.9. |
| 45°N,85°E | Mare de Sala, vel de Bachu, Ruthenis Chualenske more, olim Casitum et Hircanum. | The Sala or Bachu Sea, the Chualenske more of the Ruthenians, formerly Caspian and Hircanian Sea. |
| 5°N,115°E | Zeilam insula Tearisim incolis dicta, Ptol : Nauigeris. | Isle of Zeilam called by the inhabitants Tenarisim, the Nanigeris of Ptolemy. |
| 8°N,88°E; 5°S,110°E | Mare Rubrum quod et Aethiopicum Dionyso, juxta quem et Pomp: Melam ad Taprobauam usque extenditur. | The Red Sea which Dionysius calls also the Ethiopic Sea. According to Dionysius and Pom. Meta it extends as far as Taprobana. |
| Sheet 12 | | |
| 55°N,165°E | Cianganor id est lacus albus forte eadem est Coccoranagora Ptol : | Cianganor, which is to say White Lake, perhaps the same as Ptolemy's Coccoranagora. |
| 50°N,175°E | Tamos promont: Melae, quod ab Orosio videtur dici Samara. | The Promontory of Tamos according to Mela, which seems to be called Samara by Orosius. |
| 47°N,137°E | Lacus salsus in quo margaritarum magna copia est. | Salt lake in which pearls exist in extreme abundance. |
| 38°N,127°E | Formicae hic aurum effodientes homines sunt. | Here there are men who unearth the gold of ants. |
| 42°N,155°E | Magnus sinus Ptol: Chrise Pliu: hodie mare Cin, a Cin regno (quod est Mangi) sic an apanitis appellato. | The Great Gulf of Ptolemy, the Chrise of Pliny, now Sea of Ci, thus called by the Japanese of the Kingdom Chin (namely Mangi). |
| 35°N,168°E | Japan dicta Zipangri a M. Paulo Veneto, olim Chrise. | Japan, called Zipagri by M. Polo the Venetian. Formerly Chrise. |
| 25°N,154°E | Bergatera insula a donde se haze la benjaga. | Bergatera Isle whence gum benjamin is got. |
| 18°N,163°E | Barussae insulae praecipuae sunt 5 istae Mindanao Cailon Subut cum reliquis duabus Circium versus, Sindae autem 3 praecipuae Celebes Gilolo et Ambon. | The principal Barusse Isles are the 5 following : Mindanao, Cailon, Subut and two others to the northwestward; the three principal Sinde isles are Celebes, Gilolo and Ambon. |
| 13°S,170°E | Moluccae vocantur 5 insulae ordine positae juxta Gilolo, quarum suprema Tarenate, sequentes deinceps Tidore Motir Machiam et infima Bachian. | Five islauds set in a row beside Gilolo are called Moluccas, the highest is Tarenata, thereafter come Tidore, Motir, Machiam and the lowest is Bachian. |
| Sheet 13 | | |
| 74°N,190°E | LATIN | ENGLISH |
| 77°N,180°E | LATIN | ENGLISH |
| 80°N,220°E | Oceanus 19 ostiis inter has insulas irrumpens 4 euripos facit quibus indesinenter sub septentrionem fertur, atque ibi in viscera terrae absorbetur. Rupes quae polo est ambitum circiter 33 leucarum habet. | The ocean breaking through by 19 passages between these isles forms four arms of the sea by which, without cease, it is carried northward there being absorbed into the bowels of the Earth. The rock which is at the pole has a circumference of about 33 leagues. |
| 80°N,100°E | Hic euripus 5 habet ostia et propter angustiam ac celerem fluxum nunquam | This arm of the sea has five passages and, on account of its straitness and of the speed of the current it never freezes. |
| 80°N,350°E | Hic euripus 3 ingreditur ostiis et quotannis at 3 circiter menses congelatus manet, latitudinem habet 37 leucarum. | This arm of the sea enters by three passages and yearly remains frozen about 3 months; it has a width of 37 leagues. |
| 80°N,70°E | Pygmae hic habitant 4 ad summum pedes longi, quaemadmodum illi quos in Gronlandia Screlingers vocant. | Here live pygmies whose length is 4 feet, as are also those who are called the Skræling in Greenland. |
| 80°N,310°E | Haec insula optima est et saluberrima totius septentrionis. | This isle is the best and most salubrious of the whole Septentrion. |
| Sheet 14 | | |
| 20°S,270°E | Hicuspiam longius intra mare in parallelo portus Hacari dicunt nonnulli Indi et Christiani esse insulas grandes et publica fama divites auro. | Somewhere about here further to seaward on the parallel of Port Hacari some Indians and Christians report that there are some large islands wherein, according to common report, gold abounds. |
| 40°S,295°E | Tale in his regionibus animal invenitur habens sub ventre receptaculum in quo tenellos fovet catulos, quos non nisi lactandi gratia promit. | In these parts an animal thus made is found, having under the belly a receptacle in which it keeps its young warm and takes them out but to suckle them. |
| Sheet 15 | | |
| 18°S,340°E | Bresilia inventa a Portogallensibus anno 1504. | Brazil was discovered by the Portuguese in 1504. |
| 40°S,305°E | Indigenae passim per Indiam novam sunt antropophagi. | The natives of various parts of the New Indies are cannibals. |
| 45°S,315°E | Patagones gigantes, 1 et ad summum 13 spithamas longi. | Giant Patagonians, 11 and even 13 spans tall. |
| Sheet 16 | | |
| 42°S,15°E | Hic in latitudine 42 gr: distantia 450 leucarum a capite bonae spei, et 6oo a promontorio S : Augustini inventum est promont: terrae australis ut annotavit Martinus Fernandus Denciso in sua Summa geographiae. | Here, in the 42nd degree of latitude, at a distance of 450 leagues from the Cape of Good Hope and 6oo from St. Augustin's Promontory, a headland of the Southern Lands was discovered, as stated by Martin Fernandez de Enciso in his Suma de Geographia. |
| 45°S,40°E | Psitacorum regio sic a Lusitanis huc lebegio vento appulsis, cum Callicutium peterent, appellata propter inauditam earum avium ibidem magnitudinem, porro cum hujus terrae littus ad 2000 miliarium prosecuti essent, necdum tamen finem invenerunt, unde australem continentem attigisse indubitatum est. | Region of the Parrots, so called by the Lusitanians, carried along by the libeccio when sailing towards Calicut, on account of the unprecedented size of these birds at that place. As they had followed the coast of this land unto the 2,000th mile without finding an end to it, there was no doubt but that they had reached the Southern Continent. |
| Sheet 17 | | |
| 22°S,82°E | Haec insula quae ab incolis Madagascar, id est insula lunae, a nostris S. Laurentii vocatur, Plinio lib : 6 cap: 31 videtur esse Cerne, Ptol : est Menuthias. | This island, called by the inhabitants Madagascar, i.e. Isle of the Moon, is called by us St. Lawrence; it would appear to be the Cerne of Pliny, Bk.6, chapt.31, and the Menuthias of Ptolemy. |
| 37°S,85°E | Los Romeros insulae, in quibus Ruc avis vasto corpore certo anni tempore apparet. M. Paul Venet : lib:3 cap:40. | Los Romeros Isles in which, at a certain time of the year, the bird "Ruc" of vast body appears. Marco Polo, the Venetian, Bk.3, chapt.40. |
| 44°S,65°E | Vehemens admodum est fluxus maris versus ortum et occasum inter Madagascar et Romeros insulas, ita ut difficillima huc illinc sit navigatio, teste M.Paulo Ven: lib:3 cap:40, quare non admodum multum haec littora a Madagascar distare necesse est, ut contractiore alveo orientalis oceanus in occidentalem magno impetu se fundat et refundat. Astipulatur huic Cretici cujusdam Venetorum ad regem Portogalliae legati epistola, quae nudos hie degere viros habet. | Between Madagascar and Los Romeros Isles there is an extremely violent current of the sea in the East and West direction such that sailing therein is of great difficulty to go from the one to the others according to the testimony of M. Polo, the Venetian, Bk.3, chapt.40; hence necessarily these coasts cannot be very distant from Madagascar so that the eastern ocean should flow and spread through a more narrow bed into the western. This testimony is confirmed by the letter of a Cretan, the Ambassador of Venice to the King of Portugal, who says that naked men live there. |
| Sheet 18 | | |
| 18°S,145°E | Beach provincia aurifera quam pauci ex alienis regionibus adeunt propter gentis inhumanitatem. | Beach, a province yielding gold, where few from foreign parts do come on account of the cruelty of the people. |
| 22°S,145°E | Maletur regnum in quo maxima est copia aromatum. | Maletur, a kingdom in which there is a great quantity of spices. |
| 28°S,164°E | Java minor producit varia aromata Europaeis nunquam visa, ut habet M.Paulus Ven : lib:3, cap:13. | Java Minor produces various spices which Europeans have never seen, thus saith Marco Polo, the Venetian, in Bk.3, Chapt.13. |

== Bibliography ==
- Bagrow, Leo (1985), History of cartography [Geschichte der Kartographie] (2nd ed.), Chicago.
- Calcoen, Roger; et al. (1994), Le cartographe Gérard mercator 1512 1594, Credit Communal Belgique, ISBN 978-2-87193-202-4Published jointly by the Royal Library of Belgium (Brussels), Plantin-Moretus Museum (Antwerp), Musée Mercator (Sint-Niklaas) on the occasion of the opening of the Musée Mercator de Sint-Niklaas and the exhibition "Le cartographe Gérard Mercator, 1512–1594" at the Royal Library.
- de Meer, Sjoerd (2012), Atlas of the World: Gerard Mercator's map of the world (1569), Walburg Pers, ISBN 978-90-5730-854-3
- Gaspar, Joaquim Alves & Leitão, Henrique (2013), "Squaring the Circle: How Mercator Constructed His Projection in 1569", Imago Mundi, 66: 1–24, doi:10.1080/03085694.2014.845940, S2CID 140165535
- Ghym, Walter (159), Vita Mercatoris Translated in Osley. (Surname also spelled as Ghim)
- Horst, Thomas (2011), Le monde en cartes. Gérard Mercator (1512–1594) et le premier atlas du monde. Avec les reproductions en couleur de l'ensemble des planches de l'Atlas de Mercator de 1595 (2^{o} Kart. B 180 / 3) conservé à la Staatsbibliothek zu Berlin – Preußischer Kulturbesitz, Mercatorfonds / Faksimile Verlag, Gütersloh / Munich / Brussels, 400 pp, ISBN 978-90-6153-157-9See Mercator Fonds
- Imhof, Dirk; et al. (1994), Le cartographe Gerard Mercator 1512-1594, Bibliotheque Royale, Bruxelles, ISBN 978-2-87193-202-4
- Imhof, Dirk; Kockelbergh, Iris; Meskens, Ad; Parmentier, Jan (2012), Mercator: exploring new horizons, Plantin-Moretus Museum [Antwerp]. - Schoten : BAI, ISBN 978-90-8586-629-9
- Karrow, R.W. (1993), Mapmakers of the sixteenth century and their maps, Published for the Newberry Library by Speculum Orbis Press, ISBN 978-0-932757-05-0
- Leitão, Henrique & Alves Gaspar, Joaquim (2014), "Globes, Rhumb Tables, and the Pre-History of the Mercator Projection", Imago Mundi, 66 (2): 180–195, doi:10.1080/03085694.2014.902580, S2CID 128800259
- Monmonier, Mark [Stephen] (2004), Rhumb Lines and Map Wars: A Social History of the Mercator Projection, Chicago, Ill.: University of Chicago Press, ISBN 978-0-226-53431-2
- Osley, A. S. (1969), Mercator, a monograph on the lettering of maps, etc. in the 16th century Netherlands, with a facsimile and translation of his treatise on the italic hand ['Literarum latinarum'] and a translation of Ghim's 'Vita Mercatoris, Watson-Guptill (New York ) and Faber (London)
- Renckhoff, W, ed. (1962), Gerhard Mercator, 1512–1594 :Festschrift zum 450. Geburtstag (Duisburger Forschungen), Duisburg-Ruhrort :Verlag fur Wirtschaft und Kultur
- Snyder, John P. (1993), Flattening the Earth: Two Thousand Years of Map Projections., University of Chicago Press, ISBN 978-0-226-76747-5 This book is an expanded version of the following article, and similar articles, in The History of Cartography.
- Snyder J.P. Cartography in the Renaissance in The History of Cartography, Volume 3, part I, p. 365.
- "Text and Translation of the Legends of the Original Chart of the World by Gerhard Mercator, issued in 1569". Hydrographic Review. 9 (2): 7–45. 1932.
- van Nouhuys, J. W. (1933). "Mercator's World Atlas "ad usum Navigantium"". Hydrographic Review. 10 (2): 237–241.
- van Raemdonck, J (1869), Gerard Mercator, Sa vie et ses oeuvres, St Niklaas
- van 't Hoff, Bert and editors of Imago Mundi (1961), Gerard Mercator's map of the world (1569) in the form of an atlas in the Maritime Museum Prins Hendrik at Rotterdam, reproduced on the scale of the original, Rotterdam/'s-Gravenhage: Maritime Museum Rotterdam Publication No. 6. Supplement no. 2 to Imago Mundi.
- Woodward, D. and Harley J.B. (1987), The History of Cartography, Volume 3, Cartography in the European Renaissance, University of Chicago, ISBN 978-0-226-90734-5

== Map bibliography ==
This bibliography gives lists of world and regional maps, on various projections, that Mercator may have used in the preparation of his world map. In addition there are examples of maps of the succeeding decades which did or did not use the Mercator projection. Where possible references are given to printed or online reproductions.

=== Atlases and map collections ===
- Barron, Roderick (1989), Decorative Maps, Londo: Studio Editions, ISBN 978-1-85170-298-5
- Baynton-Williams, Ashley and Miles (2006), New Worlds: maps from the age of discovery, London: Quercus, ISBN 978-1-905204-80-9
- Mercator (1570), Atlas of Europe. There are two online versions in the British Library: the 'Turning the pages' version at and an annotated accessible copy at.
- Nordenskiöld, Adolf Eric (1897), Periplus: An essay on the early history of charts and sailing-direction translated from the Swedish original by Francis A. Bather. With reproductions of old charts and maps., Stockholm
- Nordenskiöld, Adolf Eric (1889), Facsimile-atlas till kartografiens äldsta historia English [Facsimile-atlas to the early history of cartography with reproductions of the most important maps printed in the XV and XVI centuries translated from the Swedish by J. A. Ekelöf and C. R. Markham], Kraus Reprint Corporation and New York Dover Publications London Constable 1973, ISBN 978-0-486-22964-5
- Shirley, Rodney W. (2001), The mapping of the world: early printed world maps 1472-1700 (4 ed.), Riverside, Conn.: Early World Press, ISBN 978-0-9703518-0-7
- Ptolemy, Claudius (1990), Cosmography, Leicester: Magna, ISBN 978-1-85422-103-2. The maps of the Codex Lat V F.32, a 15th-century manuscript in the National Library, Naples.

=== World maps before 1569 ===
- de la Cosa, Juan (1500), Map of Juan de la Cosa Nordenskiöld Periplus, plate XLIII.
- Ribero, Diego (1529), The second Borgian map by Diego Riber Nordenskiöld plates XLVIII-XLIX .
- Gastaldi, Giacomo (1546), Universale Müller-Baden, Emanuel (Hrsg.): Bibliothek des allgemeinen und praktischen Wissens, Bd. 2. – Berlin, Leipzig, Wien, Stuttgart: Deutsches Verlaghaus Bong & Co, 1904. – 1. Aufl.
- Mercator, Gerardus (1538), 1538 Mercator Map Nordenskiöld Facsimile Atlas, plate XLIII. Shirley plate 79 (entries 74 and 91).
- Ortelius, Abraham (1564), Nova Totius Terrarum Orbis Shirley plate 97 (entry 114).

=== Regional maps before 1569 ===
- Mercator, Gerardus (1554), Map of Europe.
- Gastaldi (1561), Map of Asia Nordenskiöld Periplus, plates LIV, LV, LVI.
- Gastaldi (1564), Map of Africa Nordenskiöld Periplus, plates XLVI.
- Gutierez (1562), Map of South America Bagrow, Plate 86.

=== World maps using the Mercator projection after 1569 ===
- Hondius, Jodocus (1597), The Christian Knight Map
- Wright (1599), Map for sailing to the Isles of Azores
- Wright, Edward; Moxon, Joseph (1655), A Plat of All the World
- Blaeu, William Janzoon (1606), Nova Totius Terrarum Orbis Geographica ac Hydrographiva Tabula. Printed in New Worlds, page 59
