= Toveyleh =

Toveyleh or Tavileh (Persian: طويله) may refer to various places in Iran:

== East Azerbaijan Province ==
- Tavileh-ye Shami, Ahar County

== Kermanshah Province ==
- Tavileh-ye Olya, Kermanshah County
- Tavileh-ye Sofla, Kermanshah County

== Khuzestan Province ==
- Toveyleh-ye Bozorg, Ahvaz County
- Toveyleh-ye Kuchek, Ahvaz County
- Toveyleh-ye Seyyed Taher, Ahvaz County
- Toveyleh-ye Yebareh, Ahvaz County
- Tavileh, Andika
- Tavileh 1, Hoveyzeh County
- Tavileh 2, Hoveyzeh County
