= Maliheh =

Maliheh (Persian: مليحه or مالحه) may refer to:

- Maliheh 1 (disambiguation)
- Maliheh 2
- Maliheh Kut-e Sad
- Maliheh Olumi
- Maliheh-ye Hajj Badr
- Maliheh-ye Sadun
- Maliheh-ye Sharqi
