= Qeysariyeh =

Qeysariyeh or Qaisariyeh (Persian: قيصريه) may refer to several places in Iran:

- Qeysariyeh, East Azerbaijan
- Qeysariyeh, Kerman
- Qeysariyeh-ye Olya, Khuzestan Province
- Qeysariyeh-ye Sofla, Khuzestan Province
- Qeysariyeh-ye Vosta, Khuzestan Province
- Qeysariyeh Bazaar, in Isfahan
- Bazaar of Qaisariye, in Lar, Iran
