= Horeh-ye Agul-e Bala =

Village in Khuzestan province, Iran

Horeh-ye Agul-e Bala Persian: هوره عاگول بالا
- Village
- Location within Iran
- Coordinates: 31°29′58″N 47°59′30″E
- Country: Iran
- Province: Khuzestan
- County: Hoveyzeh
- District: Central
- Rural District: Hoveyzeh-ye Shomali

Population (2016)
  - Total: 783
- Time zone: UTC+3:30 (IRST)

Horeh-ye Agul-e Bala (Persian: هوره عاگول بالا) (Note: Also romanized as Horeh-ye ʿĀgūl-e Bālā) is a village in Hoveyzeh-ye Shomali Rural District of the Central District of Hoveyzeh County, Khuzestan province, Iran.

== Demographics ==
=== Population ===
At the time of the 2006 National Census, the village's population was 696 in 117 households, when it was in Hoveyzeh Rural District (Note: Renamed Hoveyzeh-ye Jonubi Rural District) of the former Hoveyzeh District of Dasht-e Azadegan County. The following census in 2011 counted 796 people in 170 households, by which time the district had been separated from the county in the establishment of Hoveyzeh County. The rural district was transferred to the new Central District and renamed Hoveyzeh-ye Jonubi Rural District. Horeh-ye Agul-e Bala was transferred to Hoveyzeh-ye Shomali Rural District created in the district. The 2016 census measured the population of the village as 783 people in 141 households. It was the most populous village in its rural district.
