= Emamzadeh Khezr =

Village in Khuzestan province, Iran

Emamzadeh Khezr Persian: امامزاده خضر
- Village
- Location within Iran
- Coordinates: 31°25′45″N 48°00′30″E
- Country: Iran
- Province: Khuzestan
- County: Hoveyzeh
- District: Central
- Rural District: Hoveyzeh-ye Shomali

Population (2016)
  - Total: 337
- Time zone: UTC+3:30 (IRST)

Emamzadeh Khezr (Persian: امامزاده خضر) (Note: Also romanized as Emāmzādeh Khezr) is a village in, and the capital of, Hoveyzeh-ye Shomali Rural District of the Central District of Hoveyzeh County, Khuzestan province, Iran.

== Demographics ==
=== Population ===
At the time of the 2006 National Census, the village's population was 303 in 52 households, when it was in Hoveyzeh Rural District (Note: Renamed Hoveyzeh-ye Jonubi Rural District) of the former Hoveyzeh District of Dasht-e Azadegan County. The following census in 2011 counted 299 people in 70 households, by which time the district had been separated from the county in the establishment of Hoveyzeh County. The rural district was transferred to the new Central District and renamed Hoveyzeh-ye Jonubi Rural District. Emamzadeh Khezr was transferred to Hoveyzeh-ye Shomali Rural District created in the district. The 2016 census measured the population of the village as 337 people in 87 households.
