= Nahirat =

Nahirat نهيرات
- Village
- Location within Iran
- Coordinates: 31°33′55″N 47°59′41″E
- Country: Iran
- Province: Khuzestan
- County: Hoveyzeh
- Bakhsh: Neysan
- Rural District: Neysan

Population (2006)
  - Total: 102
- Time zone: UTC+3:30 (IRST)
  - Summer (DST): UTC+4:30 (IRDT)

Nahirat (Persian: نهيرات, also Romanized as Nahīrāt) is a village in Neysan Rural District, Neysan District, Hoveyzeh County, Khuzestan Province, Iran. At the 2006 census, its population was 102, in 12 families.
