= Somumiyeh =

Somumiyeh سموميه
- Village
- Location within Iran
- Coordinates: 31°31′43″N 48°04′10″E
- Country: Iran
- Province: Khuzestan
- County: Hoveyzeh
- Bakhsh: Neysan
- Rural District: Neysan

Population (2006)
  - Total: 104
- Time zone: UTC+3:30 (IRST)
  - Summer (DST): UTC+4:30 (IRDT)

Somumiyeh (Persian: سموميه, also Romanized as Somūmīyeh; also known as Somūmīteh) is a village in Neysan Rural District, Neysan District, Hoveyzeh County, Khuzestan Province, Iran. At the 2006 census, its population was 104, in 14 families.
