= Morez-e Bani Saleh =

Morez-e Bani Saleh معرض بني صالح
- Village
- Country: Iran
- Province: Khuzestan
- County: Hoveyzeh
- Bakhsh: Central
- Rural District: Hoveyzeh

Population (2006)
  - Total: 386
- Time zone: UTC+3:30 (IRST)
  - Summer (DST): UTC+4:30 (IRDT)

Morez-e Bani Saleh (Persian: معرض بني صالح, also Romanized as Moʿrez̤-e Banī Şāleḥ) is a village in Hoveyzeh Rural District, in the Central District of Hoveyzeh County, Khuzestan Province, Iran. At the 2006 census, its population was 386, in 59 families.
