= Zeyn ol Abedin =

Zeyn ol Abedin زين العابدين
- Village
- Location within Iran
- Coordinates: 31°32′23″N 48°01′09″E
- Country: Iran
- Province: Khuzestan
- County: Hoveyzeh
- Bakhsh: Neysan
- Rural District: Neysan

Population (2006)
  - Total: 48
- Time zone: UTC+3:30 (IRST)
  - Summer (DST): UTC+4:30 (IRDT)

Zeyn ol Abedin (Persian: زين العابدين, also Romanized as Zeyn ol ‘Ābedīn) is a village in Neysan Rural District, Neysan District, Hoveyzeh County, Khuzestan Province, Iran. At the 2006 census, its population was 48, in 7 families.
