= Harbayeh-ye Shalageh =

Harbayeh-ye Shalageh حربايه شلاگه
- Village
- Location within Iran
- Coordinates: 31°21′28″N 48°17′06″E
- Country: Iran
- Province: Khuzestan
- County: Hoveyzeh
- Bakhsh: Central
- Rural District: Hoveyzeh

Population (2006)
  - Total: 57
- Time zone: UTC+3:30 (IRST)
  - Summer (DST): UTC+4:30 (IRDT)

Harbayeh-ye Shalageh (Persian: حربايه شلاگه, also Romanized as Ḩarbāyeh-ye Shalāgeh; also known as Ḩarbābeh-ye Shalāgeh) is a village in Hoveyzeh Rural District, in the Central District of Hoveyzeh County, Khuzestan Province, Iran. At the 2006 census, its population was 57, in 10 families.
