= Alhasi =

Alhasi الهاسي
- Village
- Location within Iran
- Coordinates: 31°20′00″N 48°06′14″E
- Country: Iran
- Province: Khuzestan
- County: Hoveyzeh
- Bakhsh: Central
- Rural District: Hoveyzeh

Population (2006)
  - Total: 153
- Time zone: UTC+3:30 (IRST)
  - Summer (DST): UTC+4:30 (IRDT)

Alhasi (Persian: الهاسي, also Romanized as Alḩāşī) is a village in Hoveyzeh Rural District, in the Central District of Hoveyzeh County, Khuzestan Province, Iran. At the 2006 census, its population was 153, in 27 families.
