= Horrat ol Abbas =

Horrat ol Abbas هورت العباس
- Village
- Location within Iran
- Coordinates: 31°25′13″N 48°02′56″E
- Country: Iran
- Province: Khuzestan
- County: Hoveyzeh
- Bakhsh: Central
- Rural District: Hoveyzeh

Population (2006)
  - Total: 46
- Time zone: UTC+3:30 (IRST)
  - Summer (DST): UTC+4:30 (IRDT)

Horrat ol Abbas (Persian: هورت العباس, also Romanized as Ḩorrat ol ‘Abbās; also known as Ḩorrat-e ‘Abbās) is a village in Hoveyzeh Rural District, in the Central District of Hoveyzeh County, Khuzestan Province, Iran. At the 2006 census, its population was 46, in 10 families.
