= Arba Va Akhmas =

Arba Va Akhmas ارباع واخماس
- Village
- Location within Iran
- Coordinates: 31°26′43″N 48°09′13″E
- Country: Iran
- Province: Khuzestan
- County: Hoveyzeh
- Bakhsh: Central
- Rural District: Hoveyzeh

Population (2006)
  - Total: 31
- Time zone: UTC+3:30 (IRST)
  - Summer (DST): UTC+4:30 (IRDT)

Arba Va Akhmas (Persian: ارباع واخماس, also Romanized as Arbā‘ Va Akhmās) is a village in Hoveyzeh Rural District, in the Central District of Hoveyzeh County, Khuzestan Province, Iran. At the 2006 census, its population was 31, in 4 families.
