= Yazd-e Now =

Village in Khuzestan province, Iran

Yazd-e Now Persian: يزدنو
- Village
- Location within Iran
- Coordinates: 31°31′13″N 47°55′33″E
- Country: Iran
- Province: Khuzestan
- County: Hoveyzeh
- District: Neysan
- Rural District: Bani Saleh

Population (2016)
  - Total: 613
- Time zone: UTC+3:30 (IRST)

Yazd-e Now (Persian: يزدنو) (Note: Also romanized as Yazd Now) is a village in, and the capital of, Bani Saleh Rural District of Neysan District, Hoveyzeh County, Khuzestan province, Iran.

== Demographics ==
=== Population ===
At the time of the 2006 National Census, the village's population was 527 in 97 households, when it was in the former Hoveyzeh District of Dasht-e Azadegan County. At the following census in 2011, Yazd-e Now's population was 433 in 116 households, by which time the district had been separated from the county in the establishment of Hoveyzeh County. The rural district was transferred to the new Neysan District. The 2016 census measured the population of the village as 613 people in 138 households.
