= Garishiyeh =

Garishiyeh گريشيه
- Village
- Location within Iran
- Coordinates: 31°31′27″N 48°04′11″E
- Country: Iran
- Province: Khuzestan
- County: Hoveyzeh
- Bakhsh: Neysan
- Rural District: Neysan

Population (2006)
  - Total: 124
- Time zone: UTC+3:30 (IRST)
  - Summer (DST): UTC+4:30 (IRDT)

Garishiyeh (Persian: گريشيه, also Romanized as Garīshīyeh; also known as Garshīyeh) is a village in Neysan Rural District, Neysan District, Hoveyzeh County, Khuzestan Province, Iran. At the 2006 census, its population was 124, in 15 families.
