= Zehiriyeh-ye Bala =

Zehiriyeh-ye Bala ظهيريه بالا
- Village
- Location within Iran
- Coordinates: 31°28′00″N 47°51′00″E
- Country: Iran
- Province: Khuzestan
- County: Hoveyzeh
- Bakhsh: Neysan
- Rural District: Bani Saleh

Population (2006)
  - Total: 312
- Time zone: UTC+3:30 (IRST)
  - Summer (DST): UTC+4:30 (IRDT)

Zehiriyeh-ye Bala (Persian: ظهيريه بالا, also Romanized as Zehīrīyeh-ye Shānī) is a village in Bani Saleh Rural District, Neysan District, Hoveyzeh County, Khuzestan Province, Iran. At the 2006 census, its population was 312, in 65 families.
