= Tavibeh =

Coordinates: 31.4220°N 47.9850°E

Tavibeh طويبه
- Village
- Interactive map of Tavibeh
- Country: Iran
- Province: Khuzestan
- County: Hoveyzeh
- Bakhsh: Central
- Rural District: Hoveyzeh

Population (2006)
  - Total: 89
- Time zone: UTC+3:30 (IRST)
  - Summer (DST): UTC+4:30 (IRDT)

Tavibeh (Persian: طويبه, also Romanized as Ţavībeh) is a village in Hoveyzeh Rural District, in the Central District of Hoveyzeh County, Khuzestan Province, Iran. At the 2006 census, its population was 89, in 15 families.
