= Magteyeber =

Magteyeber مگطع يبر
- Village
- Location within Iran
- Coordinates: 31°16′40″N 48°11′15″E
- Country: Iran
- Province: Khuzestan
- County: Hoveyzeh
- Bakhsh: Central
- Rural District: Hoveyzeh

Population (2006)
  - Total: 78
- Time zone: UTC+3:30 (IRST)
  - Summer (DST): UTC+4:30 (IRDT)

Magteyeber (Persian: مگطع يبر, also Romanized as Magţʿeyeber; also known as Maktāyebūr, Makteyebūr, Maktībūr, and Makţī‘-e Jabar) is a village in Hoveyzeh Rural District, in the Central District of Hoveyzeh County, Khuzestan Province, Iran. At the 2006 census, its population was 78, in 18 families.
