= Abu Akfa =

Village in Khuzestan province, Iran

Abu Akfa Persian: ابوعکفا
- Village
- Location within Iran
- Coordinates: 31°31′34″N 47°56′00″E
- Country: Iran
- Province: Khuzestan
- County: Hoveyzeh
- District: Neysan
- Rural District: Bani Saleh

Population (2016)
  - Total: 735
- Time zone: UTC+3:30 (IRST)

Abu Akfa (Persian: ابوعکفا) is a village in Bani Saleh Rural District of Neysan District, Hoveyzeh County, Khuzestan province, Iran.

== History ==
After the 2006 National Census, Hoveyzeh District was separated from Dasht-e Azadegan County in the establishment of Hoveyzeh County, and Bani Saleh Rural District was transferred to the new Neysan District.

== Demographics ==
=== Population ===
At the time of the 2011 census, the village's population was 490 in 103 households. The 2016 census measured the population of the village as 735 people in 163 households. It was the most populous village in its rural district.
