= Karim-e Saleh =

Karim-e Saleh كريم صالح
- Village
- Location within Iran
- Coordinates: 31°31′17″N 47°56′06″E
- Country: Iran
- Province: Khuzestan
- County: Hoveyzeh
- Bakhsh: Neysan
- Rural District: Bani Saleh

Population (2006)
  - Total: 532
- Time zone: UTC+3:30 (IRST)
  - Summer (DST): UTC+4:30 (IRDT)

Karim-e Saleh (Persian: كريم صالح, also Romanized as Karīm-e Şāleh and Karīm-e Şāleḩ) is a village in Bani Saleh Rural District, Neysan District, Hoveyzeh County, Khuzestan Province, Iran. At the 2006 census, its population was 532, in 102 families.
