= Hanzala (given name) =

Hanzala, Handala or Handhala (Arabic: حنظلة, romanized: Ḥanẓala) is an Arabic masculine – originally also feminine – given name, derived from the word for 'colocynth' (حنظل, ḥanẓal). It is primarily associated with the boy character personifying Palestinians. Notable people with the name include:

== People ==
=== Given name ===
- Hanzala Badghisi (fl. c. 850), Persian poet
- Hanzala Ibn Abi Amir (c. 601–625), companion of Muhammad
- Hanzala ibn As'ad al-Shibami (died 680), companion of Husayn
- Hanzala ibn Safwan al-Kalbi (fl. 721–745), Umayyad governor of Egypt and Ifriqiya
- Hanzala Malik (1956–2023), Scottish politician
- Hanzala Shahid (fl. 2010), Pakistani child actor

=== Patronymic ===
- Abd Allah ibn Hanzala (625/26–683), companion of Muhammad
- Ahmad Husni Hanadzlah (born 1951), Malaysian politician
- Ali ibn Hanzala (died 1229), Tayyibi Isma'ili leader in Yemen
- Ali ibn al-Husayn ibn Ali ibn Hanzala (died 1287), Tayyibi Isma'ili leader in Yemen
- Banu Hanzala, historical tribe from the Arabian Peninsula
- Sa'd ibn Hanzala al-Tamimi (died 680), companion of Husayn

=== Teknonymic ===
- Halis Bayancuk (born 1984), also known as Abu Hanzala, Turkish imam

== See also ==
- Hanzaleh, a village in Iran
- Qabr Hanzalah, a village in Yemen
- Hanthel Mosque, a mosque in Sana'a, Yemen
- Hanzal
- July 2025 Gaza Freedom Flotilla, sailed on a ship named Handala
