= Beyt-e Kavar =

Beyt-e Kavar بيت كوار
- Village
- Location within Iran
- Coordinates: 31°32′43″N 48°00′46″E
- Country: Iran
- Province: Khuzestan
- County: Hoveyzeh
- Bakhsh: Neysan
- Rural District: Neysan

Population (2006)
  - Total: 213
- Time zone: UTC+3:30 (IRST)
  - Summer (DST): UTC+4:30 (IRDT)

Beyt-e Kavar (Persian: بيت كوار, also Romanized as Beyt-e Kavār; also known as Beyt-e Gavvār) is a village in Neysan Rural District, Neysan District, Hoveyzeh County, Khuzestan Province, Iran. At the 2006 census, its population was 213, in 31 families.
