= Sadun-e Do =

Sadun-e Do سعدون دو
- Village
- Location within Iran
- Coordinates: 31°30′52″N 47°58′03″E
- Country: Iran
- Province: Khuzestan
- County: Hoveyzeh
- Bakhsh: Neysan
- Rural District: Bani Saleh

Population (2006)
  - Total: 245
- Time zone: UTC+3:30 (IRST)
  - Summer (DST): UTC+4:30 (IRDT)

Sadun-e Do (Persian: سعدون دو, also Romanized as Sa‘dūn-e Do) is a village in Bani Saleh Rural District, Neysan District, Hoveyzeh County, Khuzestan Province, Iran. At the 2006 census, its population was 245, with 53 families.
