= Shenaneh-ye Do =

Shenaneh-ye Do شنانه دو
- Village
- Location within Iran
- Coordinates: 31°18′21″N 48°03′26″E
- Country: Iran
- Province: Khuzestan
- County: Hoveyzeh
- Bakhsh: Central
- Rural District: Hoveyzeh

Population (2006)
  - Total: 26
- Time zone: UTC+3:30 (IRST)
  - Summer (DST): UTC+4:30 (IRDT)

Shenaneh-ye Do (Persian: شنانه دو, also Romanized as Shenāneh-e Do; also known as Shenāneh) is a village in Hoveyzeh Rural District, in the Central District of Hoveyzeh County, Khuzestan Province, Iran. At the 2006 census, its population was 26, in 6 families.
