= Bogan, Iran =

Bogan بگعان
- Village
- Location within Iran
- Coordinates: 31°32′10″N 47°54′19″E
- Country: Iran
- Province: Khuzestan
- County: Hoveyzeh
- Bakhsh: Neysan
- Rural District: Bani Saleh

Population (2006)
  - Total: 114
- Time zone: UTC+3:30 (IRST)
  - Summer (DST): UTC+4:30 (IRDT)

Bogan (Persian: بگعان, also Romanized as Bog‘ān; also known as Began) is a village in Bani Saleh Rural District, Neysan District, Hoveyzeh County, Khuzestan Province, Iran. At the 2006 census, its population was 114, in 15 families.
