= Latif, Khuzestan =

Latif لطيف
- Village
- Location within Iran
- Coordinates: 31°32′00″N 47°56′00″E
- Country: Iran
- Province: Khuzestan
- County: Hoveyzeh
- Bakhsh: Neysan
- Rural District: Bani Saleh

Population (2006)
  - Total: 46
- Time zone: UTC+3:30 (IRST)
  - Summer (DST): UTC+4:30 (IRDT)

Latif (Persian: لطيف, also Romanized as Laţīf) is a village in Bani Saleh Rural District, Neysan District, Hoveyzeh County, Khuzestan Province, Iran. At the 2006 census, its population was 46, in 7 families.
