= Rustai Sahab Vazamel =

Rustai Sahab Vazamel روستائ صاحب وزامل
- Village
- Country: Iran
- Province: Khuzestan
- County: Hoveyzeh
- Bakhsh: Central
- Rural District: Hoveyzeh

Population (2006)
  - Total: 64
- Time zone: UTC+3:30 (IRST)
  - Summer (DST): UTC+4:30 (IRDT)

Rustai Sahab Vazamel (Persian: روستائ صاحب وزامل, also Romanized as Rūstā'i Şāḥab Vazāmel) is a village in Hoveyzeh Rural District, in the Central District of Hoveyzeh County, Khuzestan Province, Iran. At the 2006 census, its population was 64, in 9 families.
