= Sadun-e Yek =

Sadun-e Yek سعدون يك
- Village
- Location within Iran
- Coordinates: 31°30′34″N 47°58′41″E
- Country: Iran
- Province: Khuzestan
- County: Hoveyzeh
- Bakhsh: Neysan
- Rural District: Bani Saleh

Population (2006)
  - Total: 153
- Time zone: UTC+3:30 (IRST)
  - Summer (DST): UTC+4:30 (IRDT)

Sadun-e Yek (Persian: سعدون يك, also Romanized as Sa‘dūn-e Yek) is a village in Bani Saleh Rural District, Neysan District, Hoveyzeh County, Khuzestan Province, Iran. At the 2006 census, its population was 153, in 25 families.
