= Albu Soveyt =

Albu Soveyt البوسويط
- Village
- Location within Iran
- Coordinates: 31°25′46″N 48°08′54″E
- Country: Iran
- Province: Khuzestan
- County: Hoveyzeh
- Bakhsh: Central
- Rural District: Hoveyzeh

Population (2006)
  - Total: 194
- Time zone: UTC+3:30 (IRST)
  - Summer (DST): UTC+4:30 (IRDT)

Albu Soveyt (Persian: البوسويط, also Romanized as Ālbū Soveyţ; also known as Ālbū Savāţ and Shaţţ-e ‘Attābīyeh) is a village in Hoveyzeh Rural District, in the Central District of Hoveyzeh County, Khuzestan Province, Iran. At the 2006 census, its population was 194, in 36 families.
