= Omm Arqal-e Yek =

Omm Arqal-e Yek ام ارقال يك
- Village
- Country: Iran
- Province: Khuzestan
- County: Hoveyzeh
- Bakhsh: Central
- Rural District: Hoveyzeh

Population (2006)
  - Total: 46
- Time zone: UTC+3:30 (IRST)
  - Summer (DST): UTC+4:30 (IRDT)

Omm Arqal-e Yek (Persian: ام ارقال يك, also Romanized as Omm Ārqāl-e Yek) is a village in Hoveyzeh Rural District, in the Central District of Hoveyzeh County, Khuzestan Province, Iran. At the 2006 census, its population was 46, in 6 families.
