= Hajj Karim =

Hajj Karim حاج كريم
- Village
- Country: Iran
- Province: Khuzestan
- County: Hoveyzeh
- Bakhsh: Central
- Rural District: Hoveyzeh

Population (2006)
  - Total: 147
- Time zone: UTC+3:30 (IRST)
  - Summer (DST): UTC+4:30 (IRDT)

Hajj Karim (Persian: حاج كريم, also Romanized as Ḩājj Karīm) is a village in Hoveyzeh Rural District, in the Central District of Hoveyzeh County, Khuzestan Province, Iran. At the 2006 census, its population was 147, in 25 families.
