= Bani Naameh-ye Jonubi =

Bani Naameh-ye Jonubi بني نعامه جنوبي
- Village
- Location within Iran
- Coordinates: 31°31′00″N 48°02′24″E
- Country: Iran
- Province: Khuzestan
- County: Hoveyzeh
- Bakhsh: Central
- Rural District: Hoveyzeh

Population (2006)
  - Total: 153
- Time zone: UTC+3:30 (IRST)
  - Summer (DST): UTC+4:30 (IRDT)

Bani Naameh-ye Jonubi (Persian: بني نعامه جنوبي, also Romanized as Banī Na‘āmeh-ye Jonūbī and Banīna‘āmeh-ye Jonūbī) is a village in Hoveyzeh Rural District, in the Central District of Hoveyzeh County, Khuzestan Province, Iran. At the 2006 census, its population was 153, in 24 families.
