= Beyt-e Fayil =

Beyt-e Fayil (Persian: بيت فعيل) may refer to:

- Beyt-e Fayil 1
- Beyt-e Fayil 2
