= Attabiyeh-ye Shomali =

Attabiyeh-ye Shomali عطابيه شمالي
- Village
- Location within Iran
- Coordinates: 31°27′36″N 48°07′02″E
- Country: Iran
- Province: Khuzestan
- County: Hoveyzeh
- Bakhsh: Central
- Rural District: Hoveyzeh

Population (2006)
  - Total: 158
- Time zone: UTC+3:30 (IRST)
  - Summer (DST): UTC+4:30 (IRDT)

Attabiyeh-ye Shomali (Persian: عطابيه شمالي, also Romanized as ‘Attābīyeh-ye Shomālī) is a village in Hoveyzeh Rural District, in the Central District of Hoveyzeh County, Khuzestan Province, Iran. At the 2006 census, its population was 158, in 25 families.
