= Maliheh-ye Yek =

Maliheh-ye Yek (Persian: مالحه يك or مليحه يك) may refer to:

- Maliheh-ye Yek, Ahvaz
- Maliheh-ye Yek, Hoveyzeh
- Maliheh-ye Yek, alternate name of Maliheh-ye Sharqi, Hoveyzeh County
