= Hasasaneh-ye Bala =

Hasasaneh-ye Bala حساسنه بالا
- Village
- Location within Iran
- Coordinates: 31°30′26″N 48°02′09″E
- Country: Iran
- Province: Khuzestan
- County: Hoveyzeh
- Bakhsh: Neysan
- Rural District: Bani Saleh

Population (2006)
  - Total: 202
- Time zone: UTC+3:30 (IRST)
  - Summer (DST): UTC+4:30 (IRDT)

Hasasaneh-ye Bala (Persian: حساسنه بالا, also Romanized as Ḩasāsaneh-ye Bālā; also known as Ḩasāsaneh-ye Yek) is a village in Bani Saleh Rural District, Neysan District, Hoveyzeh County, Khuzestan Province, Iran. At the 2006 census, its population was 202, in 24 families.
