= Saidiyeh, Khuzestan =

Village in Khuzestan province, Iran

Saidiyeh Persian: سعديه
- Village
- Location within Iran
- Coordinates: 31°22′48″N 48°15′21″E
- Country: Iran
- Province: Khuzestan
- County: Hoveyzeh
- District: Central
- Rural District: Hoveyzeh-ye Jonubi

Population (2016)
  - Total: 199
- Time zone: UTC+3:30 (IRST)

Saidiyeh (Persian: سعديه) (Note: Also romanized as Sa‘īdīyeh) is a village in, and the capital of, Hoveyzeh-ye Jonubi Rural District (Note: Formerly Hoveyzeh Rural District) of the Central District of Hoveyzeh County, Khuzestan province, Iran.

== Demographics ==
=== Population ===
At the time of the 2006 National Census, the village's population was 151 in 22 households, when it was in Hoveyzeh Rural District (Note: Renamed Hoveyzeh-ye Jonubi Rural District) of the former Hoveyzeh District of Dasht-e Azadegan County. The following census in 2011 counted 185 people in 30 households, by which time the district had been separated from the county in the establishment of Hoveyzeh County. The rural district was transferred to the new Central District and renamed Hoveyzeh-ye Jonubi Rural District. The 2016 census measured the population of the village as 199 people in 44 households.
