= Bani Naameh =

Bani Naameh or Baninaameh (Persian: بني نعامه) may refer to:

- Bani Naameh-ye Jonubi
- Bani Naameh-ye Shomali
