= Ghomi =

Ghomi is a surname.

Notable people with the surname include:

- Ahmad Monshi Ghomi, Persian author and calligrapher
- Amir Ghomi (born 1968), Iranian judoka and coach
- Hadrien Ghomi (born 1989), French politician
- Hossein Ghomi (born 1982), Iranian judoka
- Saeid Ghomi, Iranian footballer
- Sara Ghomi (born 1987), Iranian footballer

== See also ==
- Gomi
- Ghomijeh
