= Bani Naameh-ye Shomali =

Village in Khuzestan province, Iran

Bani Naameh-ye Shomali Persian: بني نعامه شمالي
- Village
- Location within Iran
- Coordinates: 31°34′25″N 47°58′02″E
- Country: Iran
- Province: Khuzestan
- County: Hoveyzeh
- District: Neysan
- Rural District: Neysan

Population (2016)
  - Total: 599
- Time zone: UTC+3:30 (IRST)

Bani Naameh-ye Shomali (Persian: بني نعامه شمالي) (Note: Also romanized as Banī Na‘āmeh-ye Shomālī) is a village in, and the capital of, Neysan Rural District of Neysan District, Hoveyzeh County, Khuzestan province, Iran.

== Demographics ==
=== Population ===
At the time of the 2006 National Census, the village's population was 582 in 73 households, when it was in the former Hoveyzeh District of Dasht-e Azadegan County. The following census in 2011 counted 632 people in 133 households, by which time the district had been separated from the county in the establishment of Hoveyzeh County. The rural district was transferred to the new Neysan District. The 2016 census measured the population of the village as 599 people in 151 households. It was the most populous village in its rural district.
