= Hasasaneh =

Hasasaneh (Persian: حساسنه) may refer to:

- Hasasaneh-ye Bala
- Hasasaneh-ye Pain
