= Qeysariyeh-ye Sofla =

Qeysariyeh-ye Sofla قيصريه سفلي
- Village
- Location within Iran
- Coordinates: 31°24′34″N 48°11′25″E
- Country: Iran
- Province: Khuzestan
- County: Hoveyzeh
- Bakhsh: Central
- Rural District: Hoveyzeh

Population (2006)
  - Total: 322
- Time zone: UTC+3:30 (IRST)
  - Summer (DST): UTC+4:30 (IRDT)

Qeysariyeh-ye Sofla (Persian: قيصريه سفلي, also Romanized as Qeysarīyeh-ye Soflá; also known as Qaisarīyeh, Qeyşarīyeh, and Qeyşarīyeh-ye Pā'īn) is a village in Hoveyzeh Rural District, in the Central District of Hoveyzeh County, Khuzestan Province, Iran. At the 2006 census, its population was 322, in 54 families.
