= Alus, Iran =

Alus الوس
- Village
- Location within Iran
- Coordinates: 31°30′50″N 47°57′46″E
- Country: Iran
- Province: Khuzestan
- County: Hoveyzeh
- Bakhsh: Neysan
- Rural District: Bani Saleh

Population (2006)
  - Total: 93
- Time zone: UTC+3:30 (IRST)
  - Summer (DST): UTC+4:30 (IRDT)

Alus (Persian: الوس, also Romanized as Ālūs) is a village in Bani Saleh Rural District, Neysan District, Hoveyzeh County, Khuzestan Province, Iran. At the 2006 census, its population was 93, in 14 families.
