= Ayyash, Iran =

Ayyash عياش
- Village
- Location within Iran
- Coordinates: 31°23′52″N 48°12′45″E
- Country: Iran
- Province: Khuzestan
- County: Hoveyzeh
- Bakhsh: Central
- Rural District: Hoveyzeh

Population (2006)
  - Total: 56
- Time zone: UTC+3:30 (IRST)
  - Summer (DST): UTC+4:30 (IRDT)

Ayyash (Persian: عياش, also Romanized as ‘Ayyāsh) is a village in Hoveyzeh Rural District, in the Central District of Hoveyzeh County, Khuzestan Province, Iran. At the 2006 census, its population was 56, in 9 families.
