= Someydeh, Hoveyzeh =

Someydeh سميده
- Village
- Location within Iran
- Coordinates: 31°23′55″N 48°12′59″E
- Country: Iran
- Province: Khuzestan
- County: Hoveyzeh
- Bakhsh: Central
- Rural District: Hoveyzeh

Population (2006)
  - Total: 284
- Time zone: UTC+3:30 (IRST)
  - Summer (DST): UTC+4:30 (IRDT)

Someydeh (Persian: سميده) is a village in Hoveyzeh Rural District, in the Central District of Hoveyzeh County, Khuzestan Province, Iran. At the 2006 census, its population was 284, in 56 families.
