= Attabiyeh-ye Jonubi =

Attabiyeh-ye Jonubi عطابيه جنوبي
- Village
- Location within Iran
- Coordinates: 31°26′36″N 48°06′46″E
- Country: Iran
- Province: Khuzestan
- County: Hoveyzeh
- Bakhsh: Central
- Rural District: Hoveyzeh

Population (2006)
  - Total: 188
- Time zone: UTC+3:30 (IRST)
  - Summer (DST): UTC+4:30 (IRDT)

Attabiyeh-ye Jonubi (Persian: عطابيه جنوبي, also Romanized as ‘Attābīyeh-ye Jonūbī) is a village in Hoveyzeh Rural District, in the Central District of Hoveyzeh County, Khuzestan Province, Iran. At the 2006 census, its population was 188, in 28 families.
