= Maliheh Kut-e Sad =

Maliheh Kut-e Sad مليحه كوت سعد
- Village
- Location within Iran
- Coordinates: 31°23′38″N 48°13′35″E
- Country: Iran
- Province: Khuzestan
- County: Hoveyzeh
- Bakhsh: Central
- Rural District: Hoveyzeh

Population (2006)
  - Total: 461
- Time zone: UTC+3:30 (IRST)
  - Summer (DST): UTC+4:30 (IRDT)

Maliheh Kut-e Sad (Persian: مليحه كوت سعد, also Romanized as Malīḩeh Kūt-e S‘ad) is a village in Hoveyzeh Rural District, in the Central District of Hoveyzeh County, Khuzestan Province, Iran. At the 2006 census, its population was 461, in 68 families.
