= Maliheh-ye Hajj Badr =

Maliheh-ye Hajj Badr مليحه حاج بدر
- Village
- Location within Iran
- Coordinates: 31°22′39″N 48°15′00″E
- Country: Iran
- Province: Khuzestan
- County: Hoveyzeh
- Bakhsh: Central
- Rural District: Hoveyzeh

Population (2006)
  - Total: 385
- Time zone: UTC+3:30 (IRST)
  - Summer (DST): UTC+4:30 (IRDT)

Maliheh-ye Hajj Badr (Persian: مليحه حاج بدر, also Romanized as Malīḩeh-ye Ḩājj Badr) is a village in Hoveyzeh Rural District, in the Central District of Hoveyzeh County, Khuzestan Province, Iran. At the 2006 census, its population was 385, in 63 families.
