= Khoveyseh =

Khoveyseh (Persian: خويسه) may refer to:

- Khoveyseh, Karun
- Khoveyseh, Ramshir

== See also ==
- Khoveysh
