= Battle of Haditha Dam =

2003 during the Iraq War

Coordinates: 34°12′25″N 42°21′18″E

Battle of the Haditha Dam
- Part of the 2003 invasion of Iraq
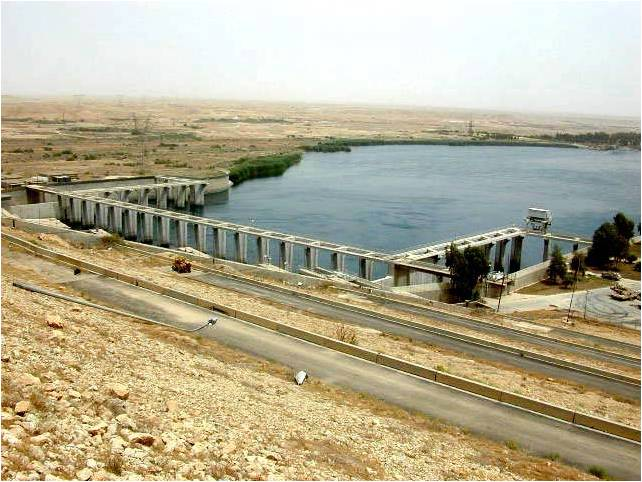
- Haditha Dam in 2003
Date	1–10 April 2003
Location	Haditha Dam, Iraq
Result	U.S. victory

Belligerents
United States	Iraq

Commanders and leaders
(United States) Pete Blaber; (United States) Shane Celeen	(Ba'athist Iraq) Unknown

Units involved
75th Ranger Regiment: 3rd Ranger Battalion; Delta Force 70th Armor Regiment	Iraqi Army

Strength
100 Rangers; 14 tanks	120 soldiers 6,000 soldiers (within 30 km radius); 30 tanks 14 IFVs

Casualties and losses
3 killed 6+ wounded	300–400 killed 29 tanks destroyed

The Battle of Haditha Dam took place in 2003. During the 2003 invasion of Iraq, United States Army Rangers seized the Haditha Dam on 1 April in order to prevent it from being destroyed. Destruction of the dam would have significantly affected the functioning of the country's electrical grid and could cause major flooding downstream from the dam.

== Background ==
One of the largest dams in the world, the Haditha complex provided fully one-third of the Iraqi electrical grid load in 2003. Located northwest of Baghdad, the dam was built during the Cold War to provide hydroelectric power for central Iraq, including Baghdad. The Haditha Dam also controlled the flow of the Euphrates into the lower Euphrates/Tigris River Valley. During the 2003 invasion of Iraq, United States Army Rangers seized the Haditha Dam on 1 April in order to prevent it from being destroyed. The destruction of the dam would have significantly affected the functioning of the country's electrical grid and could cause major flooding downstream from the dam. Along with providing flood control and a third of Iraq's electrical generation capacity, the dam provided the only other crossing of the Euphrates River west of Baghdad. An additional bonus would be by capturing both locations the Iraqi Army would be drawn away from their defense of Baghdad, which was under assault by the US Army V Corps. However, the Iraqi high command were not ignorant of the dam's strategic value, and they had stationed a powerful defensive force in and around the Haditha Dam.

== Battle ==
The battle started on 24 March 2003 when Rangers from 3rd Battalion, 75th Ranger Regiment, conducted a combat parachute drop onto H-1 Air Base, securing the site as a staging area for operations in the west. Delta Force recce operators drove through Iraqi lines around the Haditha Dam on customised ATVs, marking targets for Coalition airstrikes resulting in the eventual destruction of a large number of Iraqi armored vehicles and anti-aircraft systems. The Delta team's reconnaissance of the dam indicated that a larger force would be needed to seize and hold it, so a request was made and approved for a second Delta squadron from Fort Bragg to be dispatched with a further Ranger battalion, along with M1A1 Abrams main battle tanks from C Company, 2nd Battalion 70th Armored Regiment. C-17s flew the tank company and Ranger battalion from Talil to H-1 and then to MSS (Mission Support Site) Grizzly, a desert strip runway established by Delta Force located between Haditha and Tikrit; C Squadron, Delta Force was flown directly to MSS Grizzly.

On 1 April, C Squadron, Delta Force and 3rd Battalion, 75th Ranger Regiment conducted a night-time ground assault into the target on foot and in armored vehicles against the Haditha Dam complex. Three Ranger platoons seized the dam's administrative buildings with after initially heavy opposition, while a pair of AH-6 Little Birds orbited overhead providing close air support to the Rangers. However, it took the Rangers many hours to clear the dam complex due to its huge size and the hundreds of rooms it contained.

Soon after daybreak, the Rangers from the 3rd Company on the western side of the dam started taking RPG fire where Staff Sergeant Ronnie Jones, a Ranger sniper killed three Iraqi soldiers equipped with RPGs. One of the Ranger's rounds went through an Iraqi soldier and into a nearby propane tank, which exploded and killed the other two members of the RPG team. Meanwhile, Rangers on the eastern side engaged a truck carrying fourteen Iraqi soldiers leading to a firefight that the Rangers won, killing at least five Iraqis. When it was over, Duncan and 3rd Battalion command sergeant major Greg Birch rescued three of the wounded Iraqis who had fallen down a steep hill while under fire. For their actions against the enemy, they both received the Silver Star.

South of the dam, a Ranger platoon secured the dam's power station and electricity transformer against sabotage. Elsewhere, another Ranger platoon established road blocks on the main road leading into the dam complex to prevent the Iraqis from recapturing that area of the dam. The road blocks came under sporadic mortar and rocket fire, resulting in the AH-6 helicopters flying multiple gun runs to silence the Iraqi mortar and rocket positions. Another mortar team, firing from a small island, was engaged and silenced by a Ranger FGM-148 Javelin team. The Ranger 3rd Company endured a withering barrage of Iraqi small-arms fire from a pair of buildings, which continued over the next three days, until the Rangers were forced to call in twenty airstrikes on the structures. All day on 1 April, groups of fifty to one-hundred Iraqi soldiers engaged in "Human wave" style attacks on 3rd Company, only to be destroyed by the two Ranger 120 mm mortars and small arms fire, as well as U.S. Air Force airstrikes.

For the next five days, Iraqi forces continued to harass the Rangers at the dam, principally with episodic artillery and mortar fire along with several infantry counterattacks against the U.S. positions. The HIMARS rocket system saw its first combat deployment at the dam, firing counter-battery missions. Three Rangers were killed on 3 April by a VBIED at the blocking positions as they were searching a car; the car was driven by a young pregnant Iraqi woman who seemed distressed and asking for water. Later the Rangers captured an Iraqi forward observer dressed as a civilian after sinking his kayak with .50 caliber machine gun fire, the observer had maps of all of the Rangers positions in and around the dam.

== Aftermath ==
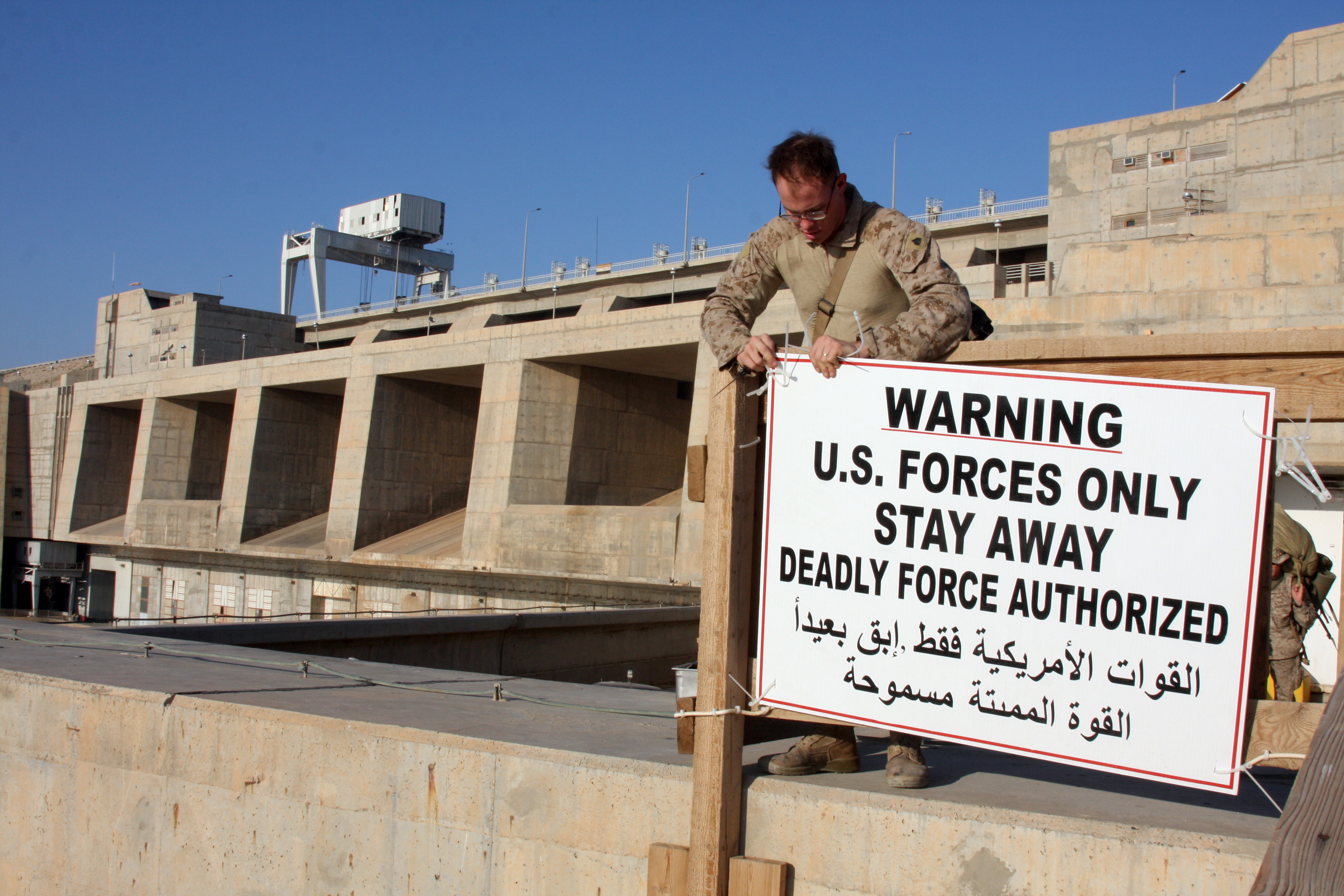
A US Marine removing a warning sign during the withdrawal of American forces from Haditha Dam in 2008

Since the 2003 invasion, various U.S. Marine units had been stationed at the dam, as well as a small detachment of soldiers from Azerbaijan. In 2004, the Gulf Region Division of the United States Army Corps of Engineers (USACE) carried out restoration works on one of the turbines to restore the dam's hydroelectric power station to full capacity. According to the Coalition Provisional Authority, the inauguration of this turbine on 3 June 2004 signified the first time since 1990 that the power station operated at full capacity.

In the same year, a new power line was established between Haditha and Baghdad with the help of the USACE to restore a line that had previously been destroyed. This new line, stretching over a distance of 223 kilometres (139 mi) with 504 towers, has a capacity of 400 kV and allows 350 MW from the Haditha Dam to be added to the national electrical grid. The cost of the line was US$56.7 million and was paid by Iraq's oil revenues.
