= Qeysariyeh-ye Olya =

Village in Khuzestan province, Iran

Qeysariyeh-ye Olya Persian: قيصريه عليا
- Village
- Location within Iran
- Coordinates: 31°25′14″N 48°09′15″E
- Country: Iran
- Province: Khuzestan
- County: Hoveyzeh
- District: Central
- Rural District: Hoveyzeh-ye Jonubi

Population (2016)
  - Total: 497
- Time zone: UTC+3:30 (IRST)

Qeysariyeh-ye Olya (Persian: قيصريه عليا) (Note: Also romanized as Qeyşarīyeh-ye ‘Olyā; also known as Qeyşarīyeh-ye Bālā) is a village in Hoveyzeh-ye Jonubi Rural District (Note: Formerly Hoveyzeh Rural District) of the Central District of Hoveyzeh County, Khuzestan province, Iran.

== Demographics ==
=== Population ===
At the time of the 2006 National Census, the village's population was 353 in 53 households, when it was in Hoveyzeh Rural District (Note: Renamed Hoveyzeh-ye Jonubi Rural District) of the former Hoveyzeh District of Dasht-e Azadegan County. The following census in 2011 counted 427 people in 101 households, by which time the district had been separated from the county in the establishment of Hoveyzeh County. The rural district was transferred to the new Central District and renamed Hoveyzeh-ye Jonubi Rural District. The 2016 census measured the population of the village as 497 people in 120 households. It was the most populous village in its rural district.
