= Tavileh-ye Yek =

Tavileh-ye Yek طويله يك
- Village
- Country: Iran
- Province: Khuzestan
- County: Hoveyzeh
- Bakhsh: Central
- Rural District: Hoveyzeh

Population (2006)
  - Total: 41
- Time zone: UTC+3:30 (IRST)
  - Summer (DST): UTC+4:30 (IRDT)

Tavileh-ye Yek (Persian: طويله يك, also Romanized as Ţavīleh-ye Yek) is a village in Hoveyzeh Rural District, in the Central District of Hoveyzeh County, Khuzestan Province, Iran. At the 2006 census, its population was 41, in 7 families.
