= Maliheh Olumi =

Maliheh Olumi مليحه علومي
- Village
- Location within Iran
- Coordinates: 31°22′42″N 48°14′51″E
- Country: Iran
- Province: Khuzestan
- County: Hoveyzeh
- Bakhsh: Central
- Rural District: Hoveyzeh

Population (2006)
  - Total: 142
- Time zone: UTC+3:30 (IRST)
  - Summer (DST): UTC+4:30 (IRDT)

Maliheh Olumi (Persian: مليحه علومي, also Romanized as Malīḩeh ‘Olūmī) is a village in Hoveyzeh Rural District, in the Central District of Hoveyzeh County, Khuzestan Province, Iran. At the 2006 census, its population was 142, in 28 families.
