= Hoveysh-e Neys =

Hoveysh-e Neys حويش نيس
- Village
- Location within Iran
- Coordinates: 31°24′57″N 48°11′08″E
- Country: Iran
- Province: Khuzestan
- County: Hoveyzeh
- Bakhsh: Central
- Rural District: Hoveyzeh

Population (2006)
  - Total: 104
- Time zone: UTC+3:30 (IRST)
  - Summer (DST): UTC+4:30 (IRDT)

Hoveysh-e Neys (Persian: حويش نيس, also Romanized as Ḩoveysh-e Neys; also known as Khoveysh-e Neys) is a village in Hoveyzeh Rural District, in the Central District of Hoveyzeh County, Khuzestan Province, Iran. At the 2006 census, its population was 104, in 20 families.
