= Attabiyeh =

Attabiyeh (Persian: عطابيه) may refer to:

- Attabiyeh-ye Jonubi
- Attabiyeh-ye Shomali
