= Someydeh =

Someydeh (Persian: سميده) may refer to:

- Someydeh, Hoveyzeh
- Someydeh, Shushtar
