= Hasasaneh-ye Pain =

Hasasaneh-ye Pain حساسنه پائين
- Village
- Location within Iran
- Coordinates: 31°29′40″N 48°01′43″E
- Country: Iran
- Province: Khuzestan
- County: Hoveyzeh
- Bakhsh: Neysan
- Rural District: Bani Saleh

Population (2006)
  - Total: 210
- Time zone: UTC+3:30 (IRST)
  - Summer (DST): UTC+4:30 (IRDT)

Hasasaneh-ye Pain (Persian: حساسنه پائين, also Romanized as Ḩasāsaneh-ye Pā’īn) is a village in Bani Saleh Rural District, Neysan District, Hoveyzeh County, Khuzestan Province, Iran. At the 2006 census, its population was 210, in 30 families.
