= Qeysariyeh-ye Vosta =

Qeysariyeh-ye Vosta قيصريه وسطي
- Village
- Location within Iran
- Coordinates: 31°25′01″N 48°10′10″E
- Country: Iran
- Province: Khuzestan
- County: Hoveyzeh
- Bakhsh: Central
- Rural District: Hoveyzeh

Population (2006)
  - Total: 255
- Time zone: UTC+3:30 (IRST)
  - Summer (DST): UTC+4:30 (IRDT)

Qeysariyeh-ye Vosta (Persian: قيصريه وسطي, also Romanized as Qeysarīyeh-ye Vostá) is a village in Hoveyzeh Rural District, in the Central District of Hoveyzeh County, Khuzestan Province, Iran. At the 2006 census, its population was 255, in 45 families.
