= Beyt-e Fayil-e Do =

Beyt-e Fayil-e Do بيت فعيل دو
- Village
- Country: Iran
- Province: Khuzestan
- County: Hoveyzeh
- Bakhsh: Central
- Rural District: Hoveyzeh

Population (2006)
  - Total: 96
- Time zone: UTC+3:30 (IRST)
  - Summer (DST): UTC+4:30 (IRDT)

Beyt-e Fayil-e Do (Persian: بيت فعيل دو, also Romanized as Beyt-e Faʿyīl-e Do) is a village in Hoveyzeh Rural District, in the Central District of Hoveyzeh County, Khuzestan Province, Iran. At the 2006 census, its population was 96, in 13 families.
