= Ghomijeh =

Ghomijeh غميجه
- Village
- Country: Iran
- Province: Khuzestan
- County: Hoveyzeh
- Bakhsh: Neysan
- Rural District: Neysan

Population (2006)
  - Total: 60
- Time zone: UTC+3:30 (IRST)
  - Summer (DST): UTC+4:30 (IRDT)

Ghomijeh (Persian: غميجه, also Romanized as Ghomījeh) is a village in Neysan Rural District, Neysan District, Hoveyzeh County, Khuzestan Province, Iran. At the 2006 census, its population was 60, in 9 families.
