= Daghagheleh, Hoveyzeh =

Daghagheleh دغاغله
- Village
- Location within Iran
- Coordinates: 31°31′30″N 48°03′56″E
- Country: Iran
- Province: Khuzestan
- County: Hoveyzeh
- Bakhsh: Neysan
- Rural District: Neysan

Population (2006)
  - Total: 224
- Time zone: UTC+3:30 (IRST)
  - Summer (DST): UTC+4:30 (IRDT)

Daghagheleh, Hoveyzeh
- Interactive map of Daghagheleh, Hoveyzeh

Daghagheleh (Persian: دغاغله, also Romanized as Daghāgheleh; also known as Raghāgheleh) is a village in Neysan Rural District, Neysan District, Hoveyzeh County, Khuzestan Province, Iran. At the 2006 census, its population was 224, in 29 families. Daghagheleh (Persian: دغاغله, also Romanized as Daghāgheleh; also known as Raghāgheleh) is a village in Neysan Rural District, Neysan District, Hoveyzeh County, Khuzestan Province, Iran. At the 2006 census, its population was 224, in 29 families.
