= Tavilehgah =

Tavilehgah (Persian: طويله گاه) may refer to:

- Tavilehgah-e Olya
- Tavilehgah-e Sofla
