= Banach (disambiguation) =

- Banach, a Polish-language surname
- 16856 Banach, a minor planet
- Banach algebra, an associative algebra
- Banach space, a complete normed vector space
