= Hoveyzeh-ye Shomali Rural District =

Rural district in Khuzestan province, Iran

Hoveyzeh-ye Shomali Rural District Persian: دهستان هویزه شمالی
- Rural District
- Location within Iran
- Coordinates: 31°27′40″N 48°05′57″E
- Country: Iran
- Province: Khuzestan
- County: Hoveyzeh
- District: Central
- Capital: Emamzadeh Khezr

Population (2016)
  - Total: 3,607
- Time zone: UTC+3:30 (IRST)

Hoveyzeh-ye Shomali Rural District (Persian: دهستان هویزه شمالی) is in the Central District of Hoveyzeh County, Khuzestan province, Iran. Its capital is the village of Emamzadeh Khezr.

== History ==
After the 2006 National Census, Hoveyzeh District was separated from Dasht-e Azadegan County in the establishment of Hoveyzeh County, and Hoveyzeh-ye Shomali Rural District was created in the new Central District.

== Demographics ==
=== Population ===
At the time of the 2011 census, the rural district's population was 2011 was 3,530 in 761 households. The 2016 census measured the population of the rural district as 3,607 in 842 households. The most populous of its 48 villages was Horeh-ye Agul-e Bala, with 783 people.
