= Saidiyeh (disambiguation) =

Saidiyeh is an alternate name of Soltaniyeh, a city in Zanjan Province, Iran.

Saidiyeh or Saeedīyeh (Persian: سعديه) may also refer to:

- Saidiyeh, Khuzestan
- Saidiyeh, Markazi
- Saidiyeh, Razavi Khorasan
- Saidiyeh Rural District, in Khuzestan Province
