= Azerbaijani peacekeeping forces =

Azerbaijani Peacekeeping Forces
- Azərbaycan Sülhməramlı Qüvvələri
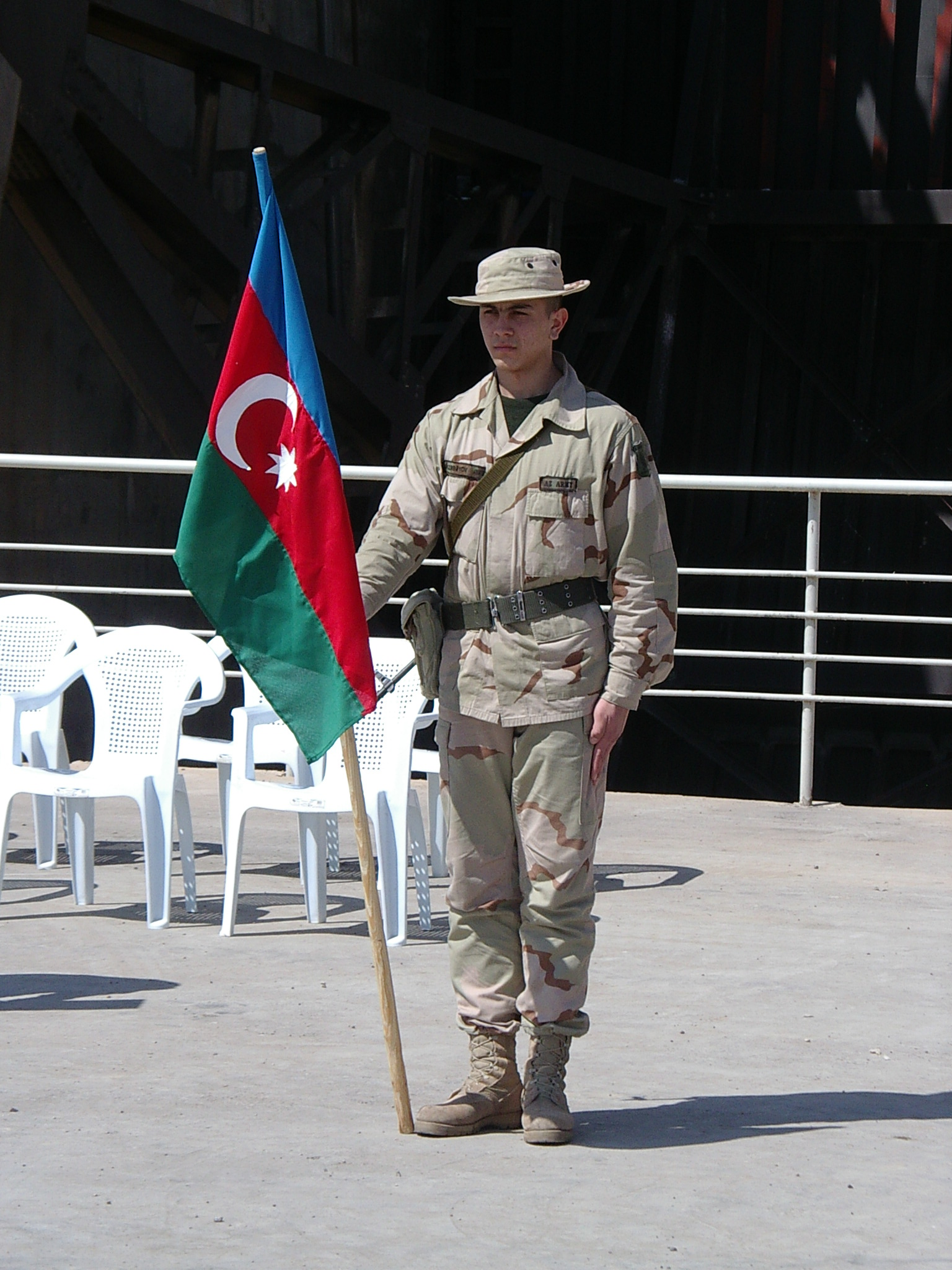
- Azerbaijani peacekeeper in Iraq
- Active: c.1997 - present
- Country: Azerbaijan
- Allegiance: Azerbaijan
- Role: Peacekeeping
- Size: Battalion
- Part of: Azerbaijan Armed Forces
- Headquarters: Baku
- March: Peace March of the Azerbaijani Peacekeeping Forces (Azərbaycan Sülhməramlı Qüvvələrinin Sülh marşının)
- Engagements: United Nations Interim Administration Mission in Kosovo, Iraq War, War in Afghanistan (2001–2021)

The Baku "N" Military Unit", also known informally as the Azerbaijani Peacekeeping Battalion is the primary peacekeeping unit of the Azerbaijani Land Forces.

== History ==
The Army's peacekeeping detachment was formed in 1997 and was later transformed into a battalion. Soldiers are carefully selected for the Baku "N" Unit. Since September 1999, Azerbaijani servicemen served with multinational intervention forces in Kosovo, and the U.S.-led forces in Afghanistan, and Iraq. They still serve with the UN Mission in South Sudan. Azerbaijan has also floated the idea of creating peacekeeping units to be deployed in separatist conflict areas of GUAM countries.

== Personnel ==
The unit is trained intensively on tactical preparation, sports, foreign languages, contacts with local residents and other subjects. After six months of training, members are sent to join peacekeeping operations.

== Deployments ==
=== Kosovo ===
The Azerbaijani peacekeeping unit in Kosovo (1 officer, 1 sergeant and 32 soldiers) carried service from September 1999 within the Turkish battalion. The Azerbaijanis oversaw eighteen settlements in the area. On 26 February 2008, as Kosovo declared its independence, Azerbaijani President Ilham Aliyev addressed the National Assembly to call for the withdrawal of Azerbaijani peacekeepers from Kosovo. The address was considered at Assembly session on 4 March 2008 and accepted with eighty seven votes in favor, three against and two abstainations.

On April 15 of the same year the platoon returned to Azerbaijan. Overall about 400 Azerbaijani servicemen have administered peacekeeping in Kosovo.

=== Iraq ===
Azerbaijani servicemen were deployed to Iraq as part of Combined Joint Task Force 7 in 2003. The peacekeeping unit consisted of 14 officers, 16 sergeants and 120 privates, who secured the hydroelectric power station and reservoir in Haditha from August 2003. One company of Azerbaijani peacekeepers commanded by Captain Nasimi Javadov guarded the area of Haditha Dam, which is one of the principal sources of electricity in Iraq. An Azerbaijani delegation headed by the Deputy Minister of Defense visited the Hadithah Dam at the invitation of the Marine Corps officials.

From 2004 the company became part of Multi-National Forces West, led by the United States Marine Corps. Ilham Aliyev’s address to recall the Azerbaijani peacekeepers in Iraq was accepted at the plenary session of National Assembly by eighty six votes in favor and one against Four Azerbaijani officers in Iraq (Maj. Huseyn Dashdamirov, Capt. Nasimi Javadov, Capt. Alizamin Karimov and Sr. Lt. Abdulla Abdullayev) have been awarded the US Navy and Marines Corps Achievement Medal.

During the Iraq peacekeeping mission, one Azerbaijani serviceman (Rafael Agayev) died. He had served in Iraq for one year and on 27 June 2008, Agayev's body was sent to his homeland, where he was buried in his native village.

=== Afghanistan ===
Azerbaijan joined with platoon to International Security Assistance Force (ISAF) consisting of 21 soldiers, one officer and one NCO in November 2002 with the aim of contributing to provision of peace, security and order in Afghanistan.

The Azerbaijani platoon commanded by First Lieutenant Shamil Mammadov performed patrolling duties in the populated district of southern Kabul. On 2 October 2008 the National Assembly passed a decision to send 45 more peacekeepers to Afghanistan. In an interview to Azerbaijani Press Agency Brigadier-General Richard Blanchette said: "As the spokesperson for ISAF on behalf of General McKiernan, the Commander of ISAF, I thank your country, your soldiers, and the families of your soldiers, for their contribution to this vital mission". The number of peacekeepers serving in the Resolute Support mission in Afghanistan was raised from 94 to 120 on 9 January 2018, according to the amendment to the Resolution "On giving consent to the deployment and participation in the relevant operations in Afghanistan of a platoon of the Armed Forces of the Republic of Azerbaijan as part of the battalion of the Armed Forces of the Republic of Turkey and under the general command of NATO structures" by the Milli Majlis on 29 December 2017.

== Gallery ==
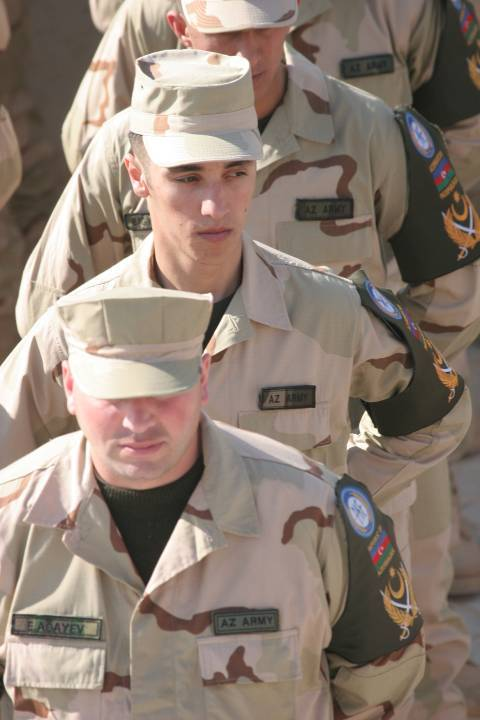
Azerbaijani peacekeepers during a ceremony recognizing their contribution to Operation Iraqi Freedom at Camp Ripper in Al Asad.

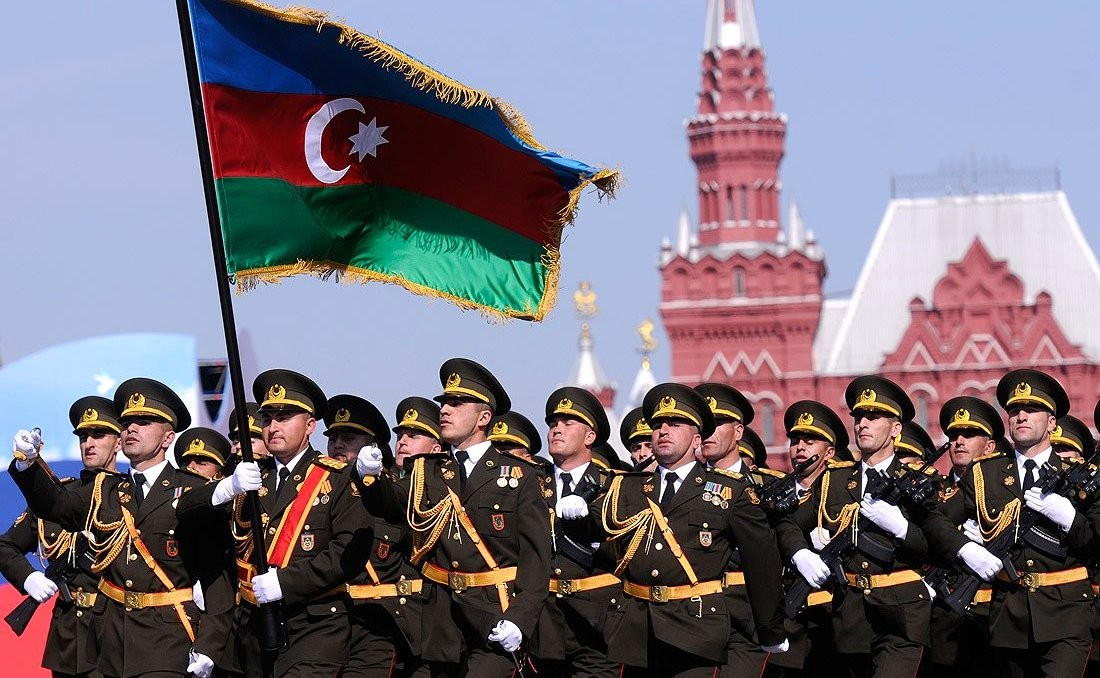
The members of the peacekeeping forces, led by Major Elshad Rustamov, during the 2010 Moscow Victory Day Parade.

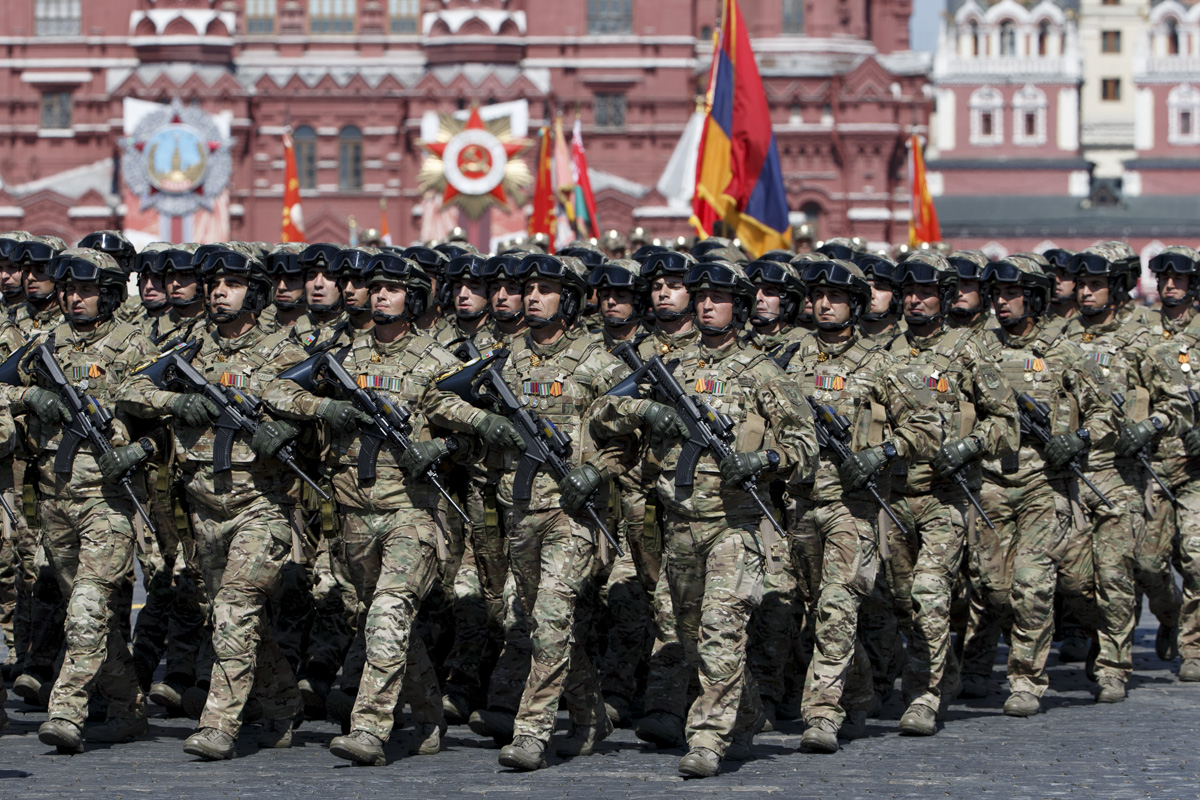
Members of the peacekeeping brigade in full combat uniform during the 2020 Moscow Victory Day Parade.

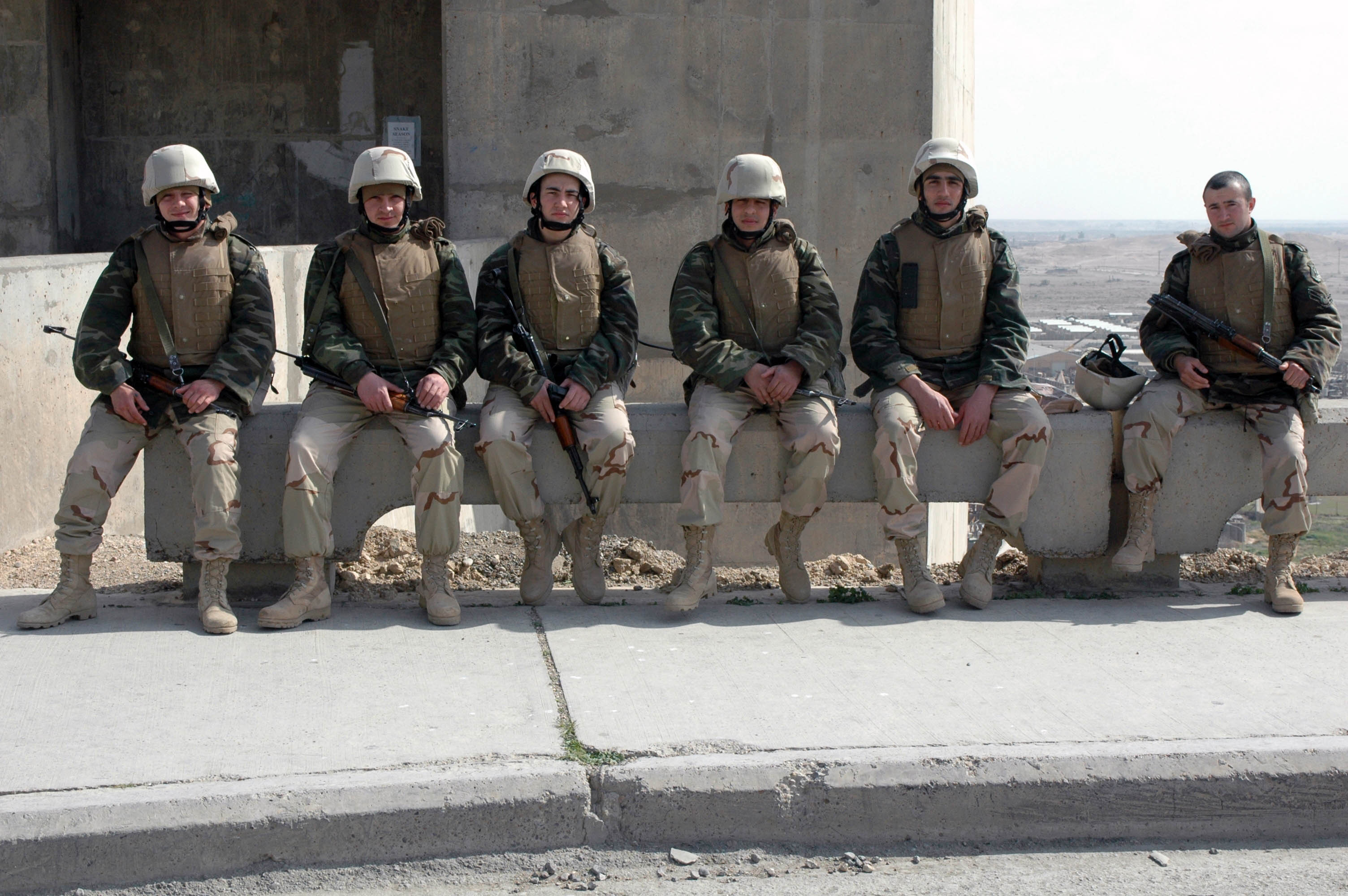
Azerbaijani peacekeepers, securing the Haditha Dam.

== See also ==
- Azerbaijan - NATO relations
- Ministry of Defense of Azerbaijan
