= Halis =

Halis is a given name and surname. Notable people with the name include:

given name

- Halis Bayancuk (born 1984), Turkish imam
- Halis Özkahya (born 1980), Turkish football referee
- Halis Toprak (1938–2016), Turkish businessman

surname

- Reşat Halis (1883–1945), Ottoman politician and diplomat
