= ALUS =

Alus or ALUS may refer to:

- Alu sequence
- Arithmetic logic units (often abbreviated as "ALUs")
- Alus, Iran, a village in Iran
- Alus, alternate name for Malek Alus, a village in Iran
- Alus (Thessaly), a town of ancient Thessaly, Greece
- Alus (singer), American singer, songwriter
