= Daghagheleh =

Daghagheleh (Persian: دغاغله) may refer to:

- Daghagheleh, Ahvaz
- Daghagheleh, Hoveyzeh
