= Maliheh-ye Sharqi =

Maliheh-ye Sharqi مليحه شرقي
- Village
- Location within Iran
- Coordinates: 31°21′47″N 48°16′30″E
- Country: Iran
- Province: Khuzestan
- County: Hoveyzeh
- Bakhsh: Central
- Rural District: Hoveyzeh

Population (2006)
  - Total: 228
- Time zone: UTC+3:30 (IRST)
  - Summer (DST): UTC+4:30 (IRDT)

Maliheh-ye Sharqi (Persian: مليحه شرقي, also Romanized as Malīḩeh-ye Sharqī; also known as Malīḩeh-ye Yek) is a village in Hoveyzeh Rural District, in the Central District of Hoveyzeh County, Khuzestan Province, Iran. At the 2006 census, its population was 228, in 38 families.
