= Operation Al Majid =

2006 military operation in Iraq

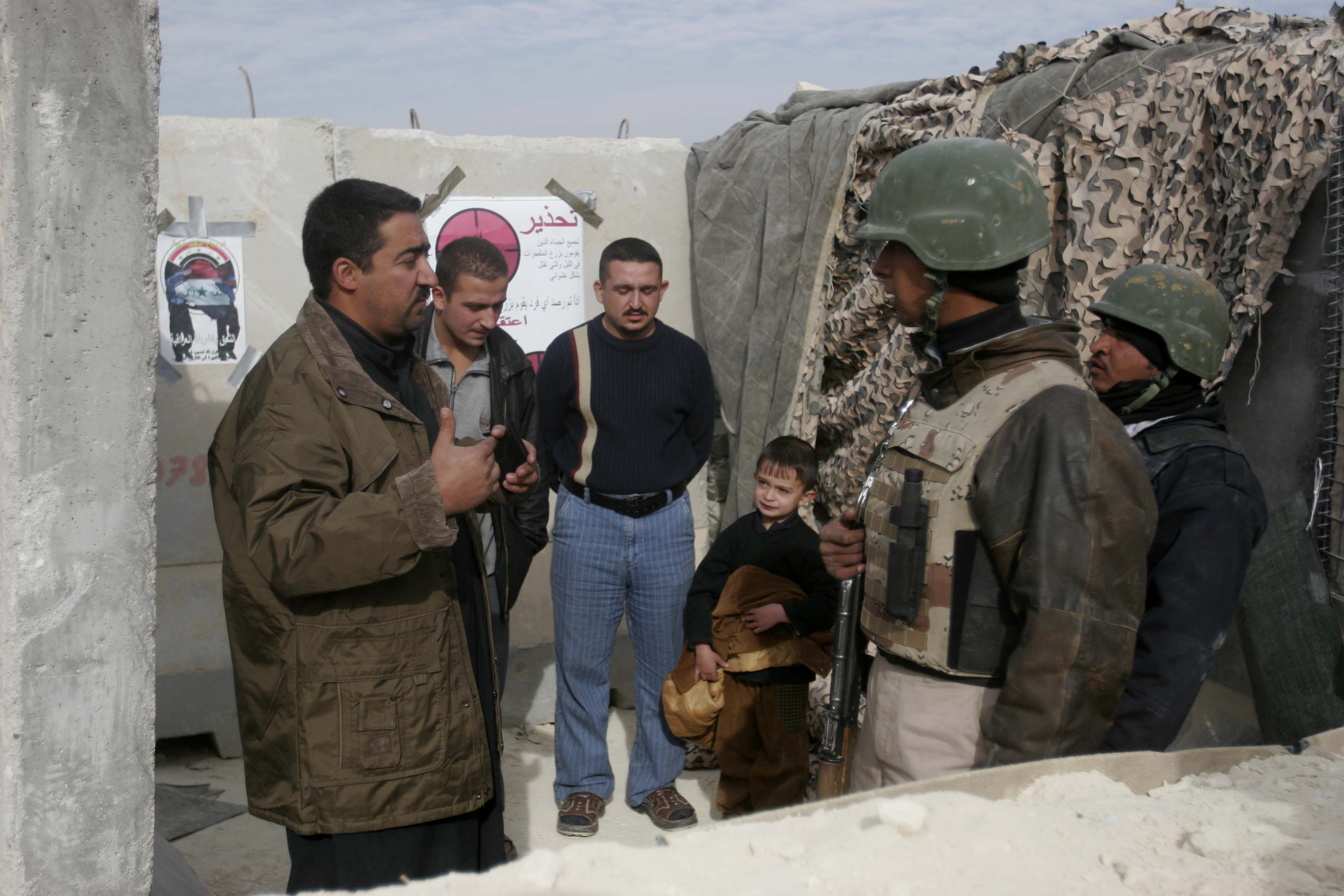
Iraqi police manning a checkpoint in Barwanah in December 2006.

Operation Al Majid (Arabic: عملية الماجد) was an operation conducted by both Marines and Iraqi security forces intended to disrupt and defeat insurgent activity throughout more than 30,000 square miles (78,000 km^{2}) in western Al Anbar Province. The operation began in the fall of 2006 and resulted in a series of berms being constructed around the cities of Anah, Haditha, Haqlaniyah, and Barwanah.
