= Haditha Dam =

Dam in Al Anbar, Iraq

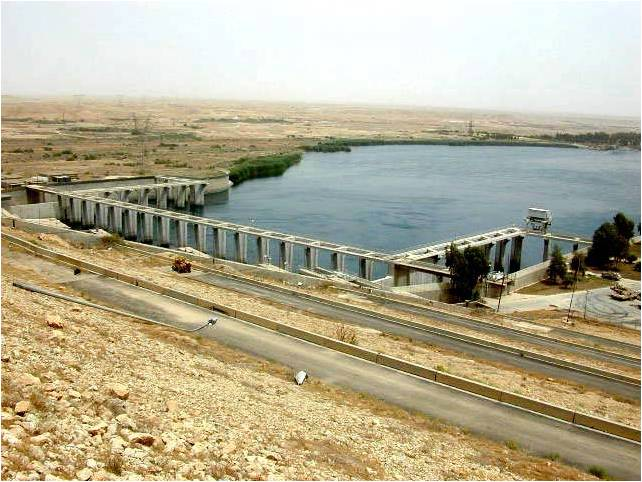
- Water outlet of the Haditha Dam

- Location within Iraq
- Interactive map of Haditha Dam
- Official name: سد حديثة
- Location: Haditha, Al Anbar Governorate, Iraq
- Coordinates: 34°12′25″N 42°21′18″E
- Construction began: 1977
- Opening date: 1987
- Construction cost: US$830,000,000
- Operator: Ministry of Water Resources

Dam and spillways
- Impounds: Euphrates River
- Height: 57 m (187 ft)
- Length: 9,064 m (29,738 ft)

Reservoir
- Creates: Lake Qadisiyah
- Total capacity: 8.3 km^{3} (2.0 cu mi)
- Surface area: 500 km^{2} (193 sq mi)

Power Station
- Turbines: 6
- Installed capacity: 660 MW

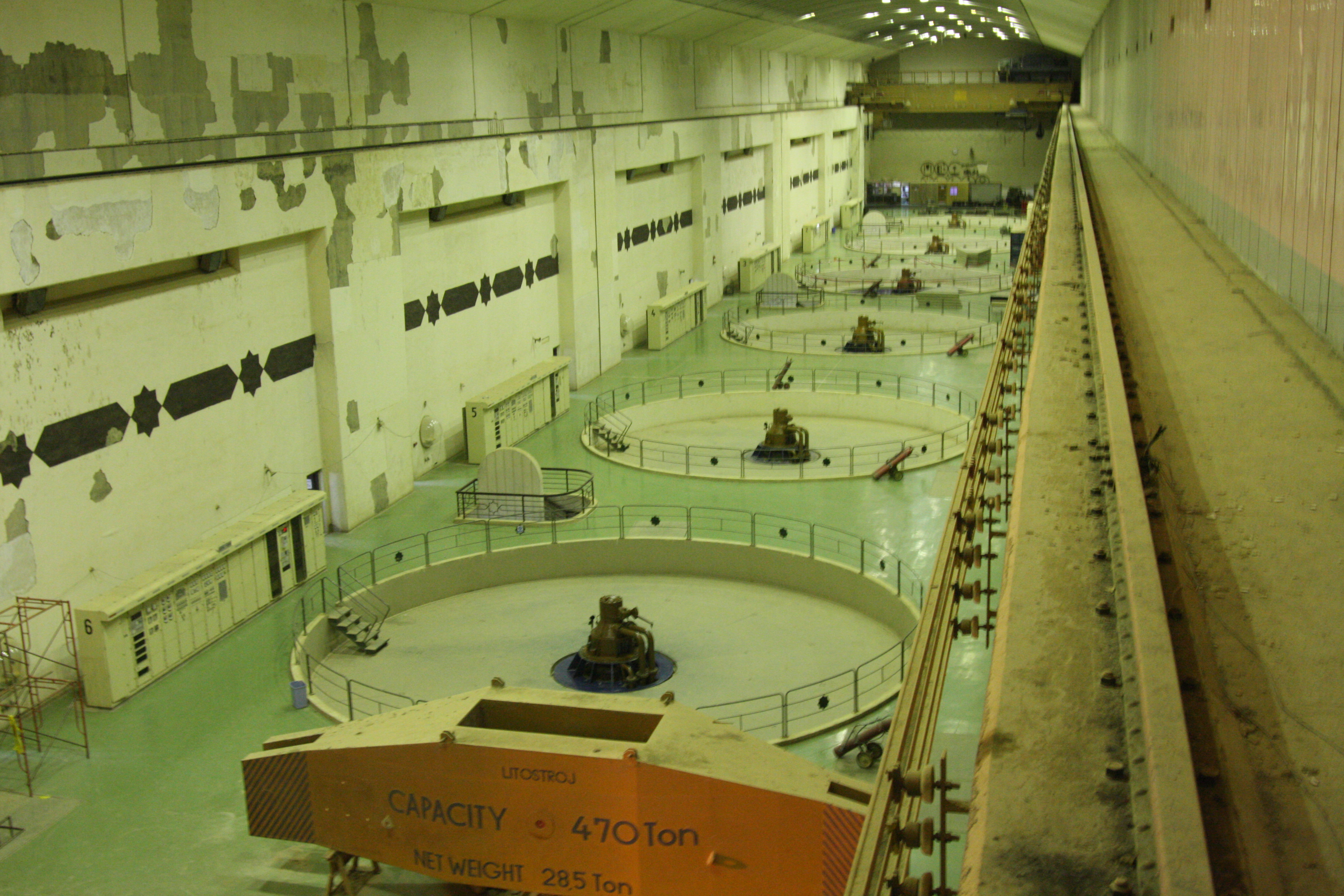
Machine hall of the Haditha Power Station

The Haditha Dam (Arabic: سد حديثة, romanized: Sadd Ḥadītha) or Qadisiya Dam is an earth-fill dam on the Euphrates, north of Haditha (Iraq), creating Lake Qadisiyah (Arabic: Buhayrat al-Qadisiyyah). The dam is just over 9 kilometres (5.6 mi) long and 57 metres (187 ft) high. The purpose of the dam is to generate hydroelectricity, regulate the flow of the Euphrates and provide water for irrigation. It is the second-largest hydroelectric contributor to the power system in Iraq behind the Mosul Dam.

== Project history ==
The Haditha Dam project was conceived in the late 1960s; construction began in 1977. The dam embankment was designed by the Soviet Union's Ministry of Energy, with its power station and equipment being designed and constructed by various Yugoslavian firms; these included Hidrogradnja of Sarajevo, as the prime contractor; Energoprojekt of Belgrade for design; Metalna of Maribor for intake gates, bottom outlet gate, radial gates; Litostroj of Ljubljana for turbines; and Rade Končar of Zagreb for generators and transformers. It was conceived of as a multi-purpose project that would generate hydroelectric power, regulate the flow of the Euphrates, and provide water for irrigation. Construction took place between 1977 and 1987 and was a joint undertaking by the Soviet Union and Iraqi governments. The cost of the initial construction of the Haditha Dam is estimated at US$830 million.

=== Flooding of Usiyeh and Anah ===
With the creation of the Haditha Reservoir, the ancient archeological site of Usiyeh along with Anah were flooded. Usiyeh was located on the right bank of the Euphrates between Haditha and Anah and was excavated by the Japanese Archaeological Expedition in Iraq between 1982 and 1983. A multi-room underground structure along with a staircase, four life-size lion terracotta statues, three medium-sized lion statues and one lion statuette were found. These findings dated back to 1800–1700 BC. Ancient Anah was also flooded and contained a prized minaret. Today, only modern Anah exists.

=== After the 2003 U.S. invasion ===
During the 2003 invasion of Iraq, United States Army Rangers seized the Haditha Dam on 1 April in order to prevent it from being destroyed. Destruction of the dam would have significantly affected the functioning of the country's electrical grid and could cause major flooding downstream from the dam. Afterwards, various U.S. Marine units had been stationed at the dam, as well as a small detachment from Azerbaijan.

In 2004, the Gulf Region Division of the United States Army Corps of Engineers (USACE) carried out restoration work on one of the turbines to restore the dam's hydroelectric power station to full capacity. According to the Coalition Provisional Authority, the inauguration of this turbine on 3 June 2004 signified the first time since 1990 that the power station operated at full capacity. In the same year, a new power line was established between Haditha and Baghdad with the help of the USACE to restore a line that had previously been destroyed. This new line, stretching over a distance of 223 kilometres (139 mi) with 504 towers, has an operating voltage of 400 kV and allows 350 MW of power from the Haditha Dam to be added to the national electrical grid. The cost of the line was US$56.7 million and was paid by Iraq's oil revenues.

== Characteristics of the dam and the reservoir ==
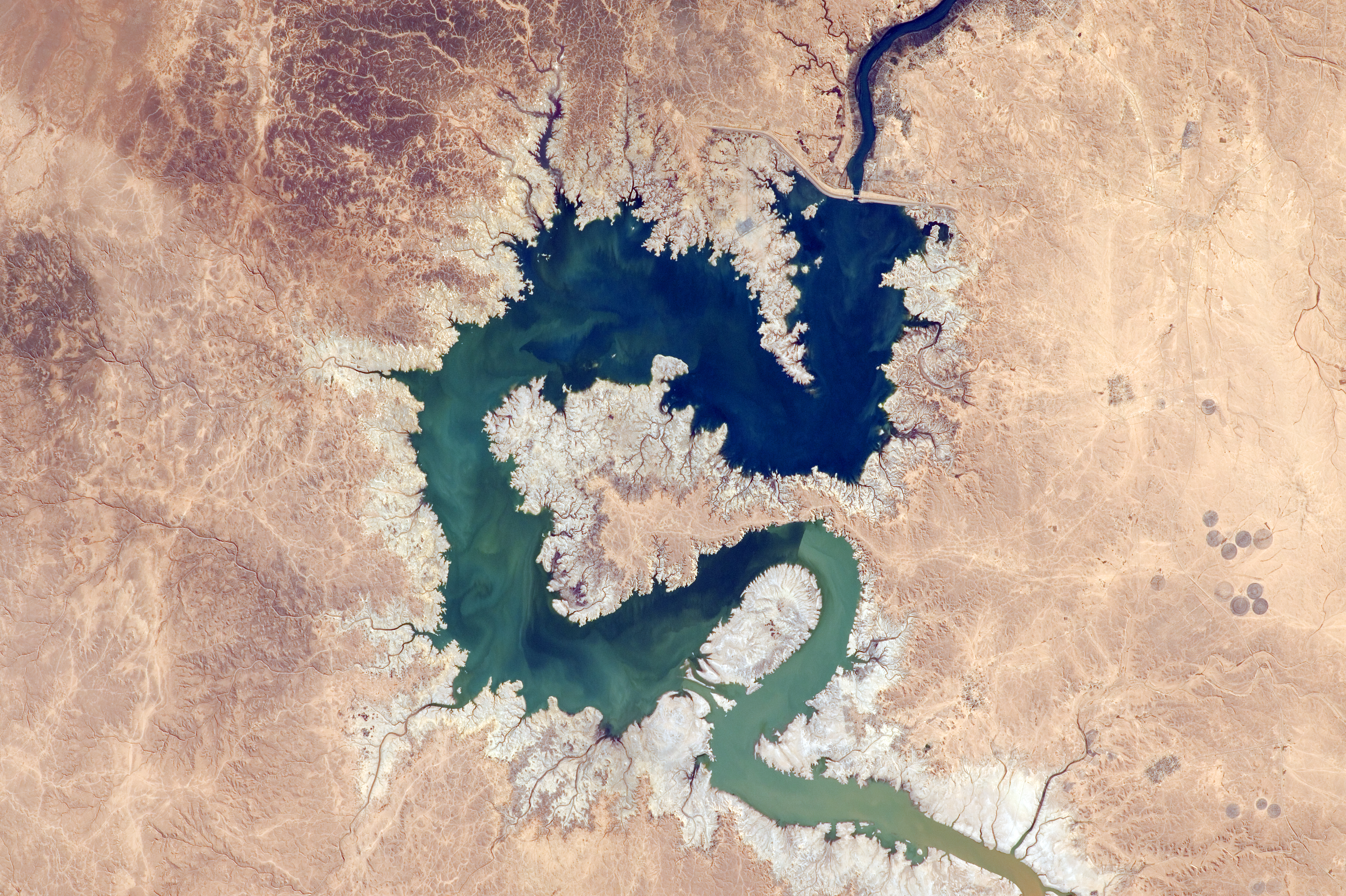
Lake Qadisiyah, as seen from the International Space Station (image inverted, with south and dam shown at top)

The dam is situated in a narrow stretch of the Euphrates Valley where a small secondary channel branched off the main channel. The width of the main channel was 350 metres (1,150 ft) whereas the secondary channel was 50 metres (160 ft) wide. The hydroelectric station is located in this secondary channel. The Haditha Dam is 9,064 metres (29,738 ft) long and 57 metres (187 ft) high, with the hydropower station at 3,310 metres (10,860 ft) from the dam's southern edge. The crest is at 154 metres (505 ft) AMSL and 20 metres (66 ft) wide. Total volume of the dam is 0.03 cubic kilometres (0.0072 cu mi). In cross-section, the dam consists of an asphaltic concrete cutoff wall at its core, followed by mealy detrital dolomites, and a mixture of sand and gravel. These materials were chosen because they are readily available near the construction site. This core is protected by a reinforced concrete slab revetment on the upstream side of the dam, and a rock-mass revetment on the downstream side.

The power station contains six Kaplan turbines capable of generating 660 MW. The turbines are installed in a hydrocombine unit that comprises both the spillway and the hydro-powerplant in one structure. Maximum discharge of the spillway is 11,000 cubic metres (390,000 cu ft) per second. Two bottom outlets on the dam can discharge 3,000 cubic metres (110,000 cu ft) per second for irrigation. Both these outlets and the spillway are controlled by tainter gates.

The Haditha Reservoir or Lake Qadisiyah has a maximum water storage capacity of 8.3 cubic kilometres (2.0 cu mi) and a maximum surface area of 500 square kilometres (190 sq mi). Actual capacity is however 7 cubic kilometres (1.7 cu mi), at which size the surface area is 415 square kilometres (160 sq mi). At maximum capacity, annual evaporation from the lake is estimated at 0.6 cubic kilometres (0.14 cu mi).
