= Banach =

Banach (pronounced German pronunciation: ['banax] in German, [ˈbanax] in Slavic Languages, and /ˈbɛnɛk/ or /ˈbɒnɒk/ in English) is a Jewish surname of Ashkenazi origin believed to stem from the translation of the phrase "son of man", combining the Hebrew word ben ("son of") and Arameic nasha ("man"). The Sephardic surname Banache presents a variant with the -ache alternative ultima, common in other Jewish surnames such as Farache, Ayache, Nakache, Harache or Marrache.

Banach means bastard in Old Polish and in some Old Polish dialects someone clumsy. As of 2023 about 67529 Polish people carried this surname in forms: Banach, Banachewicz, Banachowicz, Banachowski, Banasz, Banaszyński, Banaszyk, Banaszuk, Banaszewski, Banaszek, Banaszak, Banasiak, Banaśkiewicz, .... All those forms are connected with Banach, as in Polish -ch suffix often transgressed to -sz or -ś/-si. Additional -wicz is a patronymic suffix. Late (XVII century+) -ski/-cki/-dzki suffixes are connected with historical (middle ages) -ski reflecting Polish z (from) nobiliary particle (e.g. Jan z Tarnowa was equally known by the name Jan Tarnowski).

Notable people with this surname include:

- Stefan Banach (1892–1945), Polish mathematician
- Ed Banach (born 1960), American wrestler
- Lou Banach (born 1960), American wrestler
- Korneliusz Banach (born 25 January 1994), Polish volleyball player
- Łukasz Banach, birth name of Norman Leto (born 1980), Polish artist in the fields of painting, film, and new media
- Maurice Banach, German footballer
- Orest Banach, German-American soccer goalkeeper of Ukrainian descent
- William Banach (1903–1951), American politician, member of the Wisconsin State Assembly
