= Ayyash =

Ayyash or the variant Ayash or francicized Ayach and Ayache may refer to:

== Places ==
- Ayyash, Iran, a village in Khuzestan Province, Iran
- Ayaş, Ankara, pronounced Ayash, town in Turkey (pronounced Ayash)
- Ayaş, Mersin, pronounced Ayash, coastal town in Mersin Province, Turkey
- Ait Ayach, a commune in the Midelt Province of the Drâa-Tafilalet administrative region of Morocco

== People ==
=== Ayach ===
- Ramy Ayach (born 1980), Lebanese singer, composer, actor

=== Ayache ===
- Alexandre Ayache (born 1982), French dressage rider
- Ayache Belaoued (born 1984), Algerian football player
- Nicholas Ayache (born 1958), French computer scientist and member of the French Academy of Sciences
- Olivier Ayache-Vidal (born 1969), French film director and screenwriter
- William Ayache (born 1961), French footballer and later manager

=== Ayash ===
- Mohammed Ayash (born 1986), Yemeni football player
- Mohammed Emad Ayash (born 2001), Qatari football player

=== Ayyash ===
- Ayyash Al-Haj Hussein Al-Jassim (1864-1926), Syrian revolutionary
- Ayyash ibn Abi Rabiah, companion to Islamic prophet Muhammad
- Mohamed Sudqi Ayyash (1925-2000), Bahraini poet and author
- Salim Ayyash (born 1963), a Hezbollah operative
- Yahya Ayyash (1966-1996), Palestinian, member of Hamas
- Yasser Ayyash (born 1955), Jordanian archbishop

=== Abi Ayyash ===
- Aban ibn Abi Ayyash, a Persian companion of Sulaym ibn Qays and several Shia Imams

== See also ==
- Charge at Khan Ayash, incident occurring on 2 October 1918 north of Damascus after the pursuit to, and capture of Damascus
