= Rafi, Iran =

City in Khuzestan province, Iran

Roffaye Persian: رفيع
- City
- Location within Iran
- Coordinates: 31°35′44″N 47°53′41″E
- Country: Iran
- Province: Khuzestan
- County: Hoveyzeh
- District: Neysan

Population (2016)
  - Total: 3,797
- Time zone: UTC+3:30 (IRST)

Relief to Flood-affected ranchers by the Barakat Foundation & Basij Troops in Rafi Khuzestan Province Iran- 3 Feb 2019

Rafi (Persian: رفيع) (Note: Also romanized as Rafī‘) is a city in, and the capital of, Neysan District of Hoveyzeh County, Khuzestan province, Iran.

== Demographics ==
=== Population ===
At the time of the 2006 National Census, the city's population was 3,810 in 631 households, when it was in the former Hoveyzeh District of Dasht-e Azadegan County. The following census in 2011 counted 3,690 people in 819 households, by which time the district had been separated from the county in the establishment of Hoveyzeh County. Rafi was transferred to the new Neysan District. The 2016 census measured the population of the city as 3,797 people in 1,006 households.
