= Gomi =

Gomi may refer to:

- Gomi (surname)
- 7035 Gomi, a main-belt asteroid
- Gomi (comics), a fictional character in the Marvel Comics Universe
- Get Off My Internets, a website devoted to critiques of online personalities, particularly bloggers
- Gomi, Japanese for trash, and the name of an art movement that uses trash
