= Maliheh-ye Yek, Ahvaz =

Maliheh-ye Yek مليحه يك
- Village
- Location within Iran
- Coordinates: 31°20′07″N 48°20′58″E
- Country: Iran
- Province: Khuzestan
- County: Ahvaz
- Bakhsh: Hamidiyeh
- Rural District: Jahad

Population (2006)
  - Total: 170
- Time zone: UTC+3:30 (IRST)
  - Summer (DST): UTC+4:30 (IRDT)

Maliheh-ye Yek (Persian: مليحه يك, also Romanized as Malīḩeh-ye Yek) is a village in Jahad Rural District, Hamidiyeh District, Ahvaz County, Khuzestan Province, Iran. At the 2006 census, its population was 170, in 27 families.
