= Hoveyzeh =

City in Khuzestan province, Iran

Hoveyzeh Persian: هویزه Arabic: الحويزة
- City
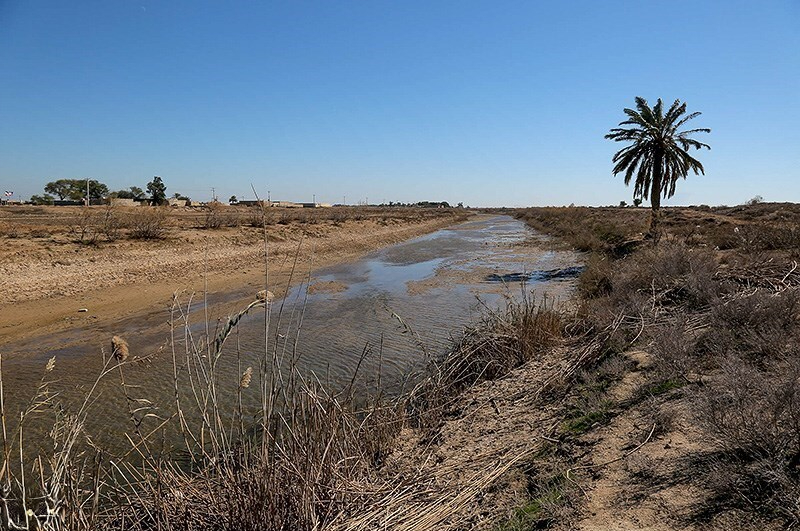
- Hoveyzeh county

- Location within Iran
- Coordinates: 31°27′38″N 48°04′41″E
- Country: Iran
- Province: Khuzestan
- County: Hoveyzeh
- District: Central

Population (2016)
  - Total: 19,481
- Time zone: UTC+3:30 (IRST)

Hoveyzeh (Persian: هویزه) (Note: Also romanized as Havizeh, Hawīzeh, and Hovayzeh; also known as Hawiza, Hovayze, Hūzgān and Khūzgān; also Huwaiza; also Hozegan during the Pahlavi Era; and Arabic: الهويزة) is a city in the Central District of Hoveyzeh County, Khuzestan province, Iran, serving as capital of both the county and the district.

== Demographics ==
=== Population ===
At the time of the 2006 National Census, the city's population was 14,422 in 2,749 households, when it was capital of the former Hoveyzeh District of Dasht-e Azadegan County. The following census in 2011 counted 16,154 people in 3,779 households, by which time the district had been separated from the county in the establishment of Hoveyzeh County. Hoveyzeh was transferred to the new Central District as the county's capital. The 2016 census measured the population of the city as 19,481 people in 4,904 households.

== Mandaean community ==
Historically, the town was home to a Mandaean community for centuries, which no longer exists in the 21st century due to emigration.

== See also ==
- Iran–Iraq war
- Khorramshahr
- Susangerd
- Shadegan
- Bostan
