= Gomi (surname) =

Gomi (written: 五味) is a Japanese surname. Notable people with the surname include:

- Gomi Kosuke (五味 康祐, 1921 – 1980), Japanese novelist
- Takanori Gomi (五味 隆典, born 1978), "The Fireball Kid", Japanese mixed martial arts fighter
- Taro Gomi (五味 太郎, born 1945), Japanese children's book illustrator and writer
- Yoshiyasu Gomi (五味 芳保, born 1933), Japanese speed-skater
