= Toveyleh-ye Bozorg =

Village in Khuzestan, Iran

Toveyleh-ye Bozorg طويله بزرگ
- Village
- Location within Iran
- Coordinates: 31°22′04″N 49°07′25″E
- Country: Iran
- Province: Khuzestan
- County: Ahvaz
- Bakhsh: Central
- Rural District: Gheyzaniyeh

Population (2006)
  - Total: 49
- Time zone: UTC+3:30 (IRST)
  - Summer (DST): UTC+4:30 (IRDT)

Toveyleh-ye Bozorg (Persian: طويله بزرگ, also Romanized as Ţoveyleh-ye Bozorg, Ţavīleh Bozorg, Tavilehé Bozorg, and Ţavīleh-ye Bozorg; also known as Ţoveyleh-ye Bozorg-e Ḩājj Yāser and Ţoveyleh-ye Bozorg-e Ḩāj Yāser) is a village in Gheyzaniyeh Rural District, in the Central District of Ahvaz County, Khuzestan Province, Iran. At the 2006 census, its population was 49, in 11 families.
