= Someydeh, Shoushtar =

Someydeh سميده
- Village
- Location within Iran
- Coordinates: 31°44′35″N 48°57′51″E
- Country: Iran
- Province: Khuzestan
- County: Shushtar
- Bakhsh: Central
- Rural District: Miyan Ab

Population (2006)
  - Total: 204
- Time zone: UTC+3:30 (IRST)
  - Summer (DST): UTC+4:30 (IRDT)

Someydeh (Persian: سميده; also known as Khoşāf-e Someydeh, Khoẕāf-e Someydeh, and Samideh) is a village in Miyan Ab Rural District, in the Central District of Shushtar County, Khuzestan Province, Iran. At the 2006 census, its population was 204, in 27 families.
