= Tavileh-ye Shami =

Tavileh-ye Shami طويله شامي
- Village
- Location within Iran
- Coordinates: 38°27′48″N 47°10′39″E
- Country: Iran
- Province: East Azerbaijan
- County: Ahar
- Bakhsh: Central
- Rural District: Bozkosh

Population (2006)
  - Total: 84
- Time zone: UTC+3:30 (IRST)
  - Summer (DST): UTC+4:30 (IRDT)

Tavileh-ye Shami (Persian: طويله شامي, also Romanized as Ţavīleh-ye Shāmī; also known as Ţavīleh-ye Shāqī) is a village in Bozkosh Rural District, in the Central District of Ahar County, East Azerbaijan Province, Iran. At the 2006 census, its population was 84, in 15 families.
