= Toveyleh-ye Yebareh =

Toveyleh-ye Yebareh طويله يباره
- Village
- Location within Iran
- Coordinates: 31°22′45″N 49°07′52″E
- Country: Iran
- Province: Khuzestan
- County: Ahvaz
- Bakhsh: Central
- Rural District: Gheyzaniyeh

Population (2006)
  - Total: 42
- Time zone: UTC+3:30 (IRST)
  - Summer (DST): UTC+4:30 (IRDT)

Toveyleh-ye Yebareh (Persian: طويله يباره, also Romanized as Ţoveyleh-ye Yebāreh) is a village in Gheyzaniyeh Rural District, in the Central District of Ahvaz County, Khuzestan Province, Iran. At the 2006 census, its population was 42, in 8 families.
