= Qeysariyeh, Kerman =

Qeysariyeh قيصريه
- Village
- Location within Iran
- Coordinates: 28°41′44″N 57°39′34″E
- Country: Iran
- Province: Kerman
- County: Jiroft
- Bakhsh: Central
- Rural District: Halil

Population (2006)
  - Total: 132
- Time zone: UTC+3:30 (IRST)
  - Summer (DST): UTC+4:30 (IRDT)

Qeysariyeh (Persian: قيصريه, also Romanized as Qeyṣarīyeh; also known as Qaşrī) is a village in Halil Rural District, in the Central District of Jiroft County, Kerman Province, Iran. At the 2006 census, its population was 132, in 33 families.
