= Toveyleh-ye Kuchek =

Toveyleh-ye Kuchek طويله كوچك
- Village
- Location within Iran
- Coordinates: 31°20′00″N 49°06′54″E
- Country: Iran
- Province: Khuzestan
- County: Ahvaz
- Bakhsh: Central
- Rural District: Gheyzaniyeh

Population (2006)
  - Total: 209
- Time zone: UTC+3:30 (IRST)
  - Summer (DST): UTC+4:30 (IRDT)

Toveyleh-ye Kuchek (Persian: طويله كوچك, also Romanized as Ţoveyleh-ye Kūchek, Ţoveyleh-ye Kūchak, Tavilehé Koochak, Ţavīleh Kūchek, Ţavīleh-ye Kūchak, and Ţavīleh-ye Kūchek; also known as Ţavīleh-ye Ma‘ārej and Loveyleh-ye Kūchek) is a village in Gheyzaniyeh Rural District, in the Central District of Ahvaz County, Khuzestan Province, Iran. At the 2006 census, its population was 209, in 37 families.
