= Sa'd ibn Hanzala al-Tamimi =

Sa'd ibn Hanzala al-Tamimi سعد بن حنظله تمیمی

Personal life
- Died: 10th of Muharram, 61 A.H. / 10 October, 680 AD (aged 75)
- Cause of death: Killed in the Battle of Karbala
- Resting place: Karbala, Iraq
- Known for: Being a companion of Hussain ibn Ali

Religious life
- Religion: Islam

Sa'd ibn Hanzala al-Tamimi was among prominent of Hussain ibn Ali's companion. He was martyred on the Day of Ashura in Battle of Karbala.

== Name ==
His name was mentioned with slight variations in historical sources among the martyrs of Karbala, but in other resource believed that his correct name was Hanzala ibn As'ad al-Shibami which has been explicitly. It seems that the name of the son was mistaken with the name of the father and 'As'ad was distorted to Sa'd.

== In the Battle of Karbala ==
Sa'd was a great warrior and one of the prominent companions of Hussain. On the Day of Ashura when the battle had become intense, he went to Hussain and asked him for permission to go to the battlefield. After receiving permission and farewell to Hussain, he went to the battlefield.

He went to the battlefield before the noon on the Day of Ashura. He went to the battlefield after Khalid ibn 'Amr al-Azdi and before Umayr ibn Abd Allah al-Madhhiji and after a brave fight, killed and wounded many soldiers and was martyred in the desert of Karbala in defense of the family of Ali ibn Abi Talib.
