= Maliheh-ye Sadun =

Maliheh-ye Sadun مليحه سعدون
- Village
- Location within Iran
- Coordinates: 31°21′05″N 48°18′14″E
- Country: Iran
- Province: Khuzestan
- County: Ahvaz
- Bakhsh: Hamidiyeh
- Rural District: Jahad

Population (2006)
  - Total: 321
- Time zone: UTC+3:30 (IRST)
  - Summer (DST): UTC+4:30 (IRDT)

Maliheh-ye Sadun (Persian: مليحه سعدون, also Romanized as Malīḩeh-ye Sa‘dūn; also known as Malīḩeh-ye Do) is a village in Jahad Rural District, Hamidiyeh District, Ahvaz County, Khuzestan Province, Iran. At the 2006 census, its population was 321, in 53 families.
