= Tavilehgah-e Olya =

Village in Kermanshah, Iran

Tavilehgah-e Olya طويله گاه عليا
- Village
- Location within Iran
- Coordinates: 33°50′43″N 47°03′35″E
- Country: Iran
- Province: Kermanshah
- County: Kermanshah
- Bakhsh: Firuzabad
- Rural District: Jalalvand

Population (2006)
  - Total: 36
- Time zone: UTC+3:30 (IRST)
  - Summer (DST): UTC+4:30 (IRDT)

Tavilehgah-e Olya (Persian: طويله گاه عليا, also Romanized as Ţavīlehgāh-e ‘Olyā; also known as Ţavīleh-ye ‘Olyā) is a village in Jalalvand Rural District, Firuzabad District, Kermanshah County, Kermanshah Province, Iran. At the 2006 census, its population was 36, in 8 families.
