= Halis Bayancuk =

Turkish cleric

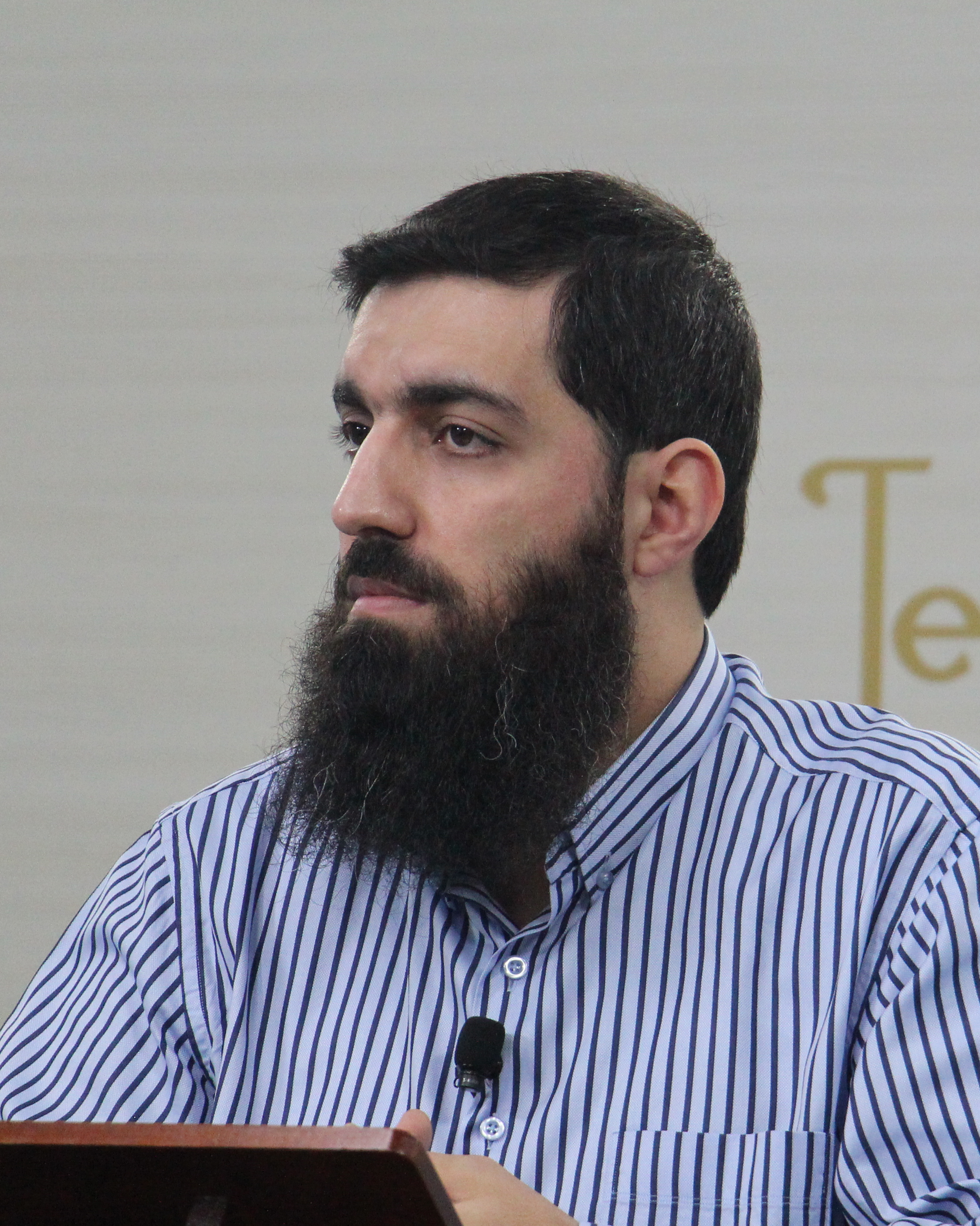
- Bayancuk in 2020

Personal life
- Born: 1984 (age 41–42) Diyarbakır, Turkey
- Main interest(s): Fiqh, Tafsir, 'Aqidah
- Education: Al-Azhar University
- Occupation: Writer, Preacher
- Website: halisbayancuk.com

Religious life
- Religion: Islam
- Denomination: Sunni
- Jurisprudence: Shafi'i
- Creed: Athari

Halis Bayancuk (born 1984, Diyarbakır, Turkey), also known as Abu Hanzala, is a Turkish imam of Zaza descent who was under custody for alleged connection to ISIS and al-Qaeda. He was released in 2024 due to insufficient evidence.

== Biography ==
Bayancuk was born in Diyarbakir to a Zaza family coming from Bingöl. His father, Haci Bayancuk, also called "Hafiz", was a leader of the political wing of the Kurdish Hezbollah and is currently serving a life sentence in prison. Until 1998, Halis spent his youth in Diyarbakır.

After his father's 2005 arrest, he spent 3 years in Egypt, where he was educated with the support of the diaspora Kurds in Germany who were tied to the Kurdish Hezbollah and returned to Turkey in 2008. Halis was later arrested for alleged involvement in the 2008 Istanbul bombings before being released on 15 May 2009 due to lack of evidence.

He was again arrested in 2011 for connections to Al-Qaeda. He was arrested along with fifty others who were suspected of planning a bombing. He was released on 24 January 2013 after prosecutors again failed to convict him due to lack of evidence.

He was arrested for a third time in Van Province on 14 January 2014 and police believed they had enough evidence to convict him, but due to the 2013 corruption scandal in Turkey the police officers and prosecutors working on his case were fired and he was released on 9 November 2014.

On 18 July 2015 he addressed a congregation of over one thousand Islamic State supporters. On 24 July 2015, he was arrested by police and described as the leader of the Islamic State in Turkey and involvement in multiple bombings in Turkey. He and other suspects were released pending trial on 24 March 2016.

On 8 March 2017 he was arrested again and accused of threatening the governor of Ankara. As of November 2017, he was in detention, accused of teaching at a pro-IS madrassa in Ankara. The court in Sakarya sentenced him to 12 years and 6 months imprisonment on 28 June 2018. However, in August 2019, a court in Istanbul reversed the verdict and sent the case back to Sakarya for a retrial. In a controversial decision, the court in Sakarya ruled to release Bayancuk on 9 April 2020. Bayancuk was re-arrested the same day following an uproar by the Turkish society who compared his case with the one of other politicians and academics.

In September 2020, Bayancuk was given a verdict of 12 years and 6 months imprisonment. His lawyer defended him, arguing Bayancuk is merely following the political framework given through by the Quran and wouldn't follow ISIS doctrine, when he says that democracy is for infidels and wants the society to be ruled by the principles of the Quran.

Halis can be found in various videos rejecting any association with ISIS and condemning the terrorist organisations methods.
