= Tavilehgah-e Sofla =

Tavilehgah-e Sofla طويله گاه سفلي
- Village
- Location within Iran
- Coordinates: 33°50′42″N 47°03′55″E
- Country: Iran
- Province: Kermanshah
- County: Kermanshah
- Bakhsh: Firuzabad
- Rural District: Jalalvand

Population (2006)
  - Total: 25
- Time zone: UTC+3:30 (IRST)
  - Summer (DST): UTC+4:30 (IRDT)

Tavilehgah-e Sofla (Persian: طويله گاه سفلي, also Romanized as Ţavīlehgāh-e Soflá; also known as Ţavīleh-ye Gāv and Ţavīleh-ye Soflá) is a village in Jalalvand Rural District, Firuzabad District, Kermanshah County, Kermanshah Province, Iran. At the 2006 census, its population was 25, in 7 families.
