= Haditha =

Town in Al Anbar, Iraq

Haditha Arabic: حَدِيثَةٌ
- Town
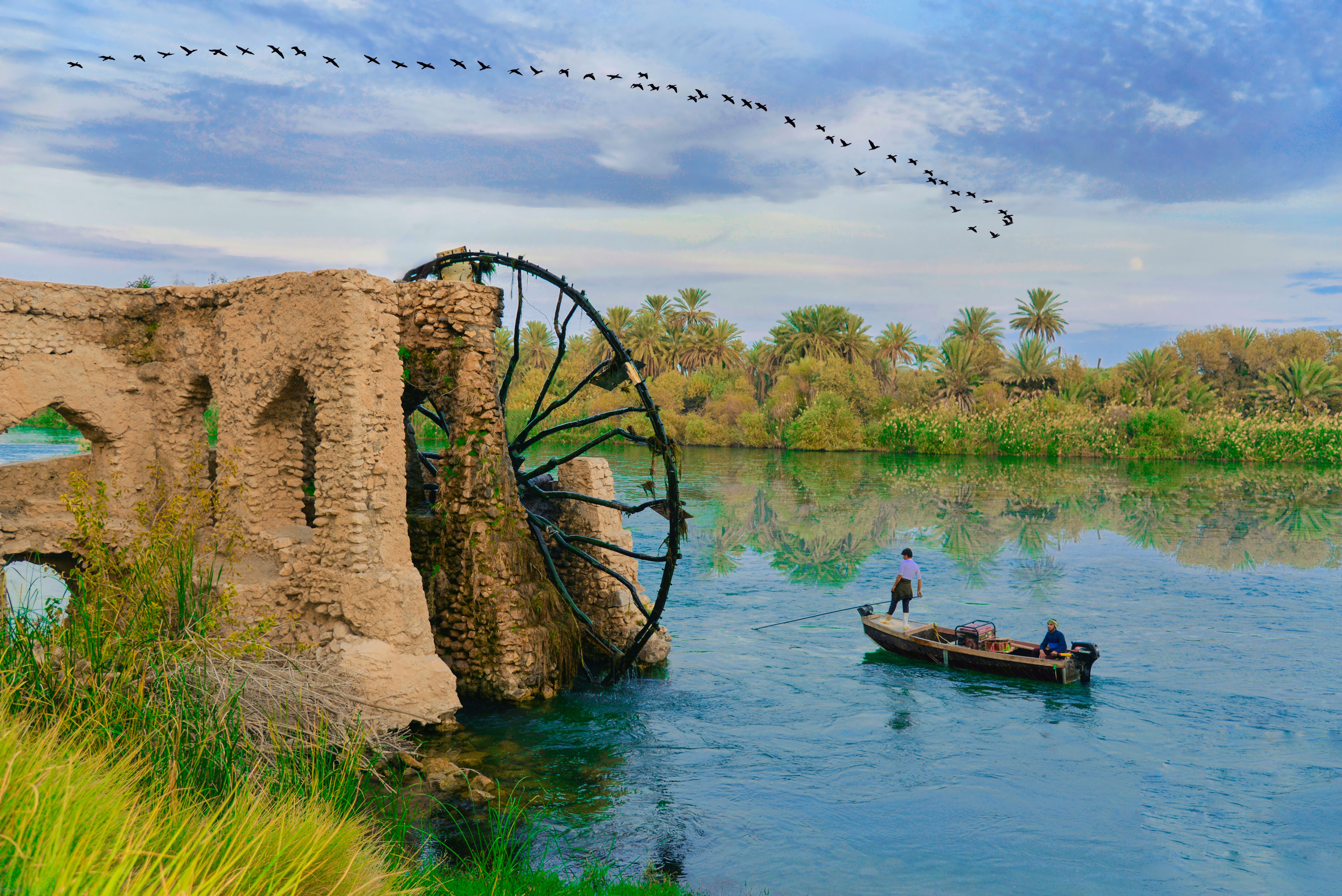

- Location within Iraq
- Coordinates: 34°08′23″N 42°22′41″E
- Country: Iraq
- Province: Al-Anbar
- Elevation: 351 ft (107 m)

Population (2018)
  - Total: 46,500
- Time zone: UTC+03:00 (AST)
- Postal code: 31004

Haditha (Arabic: حَدِيثَةٌ, al-Ḥadīthah) is a town in the Al Anbar Governorate, about 240 km (150 mi) northwest of Baghdad. It is a farming town situated on the Euphrates River. Its population of around 46,500 people, predominantly Sunni Muslim Arabs. The town lies near the Buhayrat al Qadisiyyah, an artificial lake which was created by the building of the Haditha Dam, the largest hydroelectric facility in Iraq.

== Politics ==
Haditha is officially a political district subordinate to the Al Anbar Province. The Haditha District consists of the Sub-Districts of Haditha [City], the Haqlaniyah Sub-District, and the Barwannah Sub-District. Each district is governed by a Mayor and a Sub-District Council. The twenty member sub-district councils elect one of their own to serve as the Council Chairman. They also employ other municipal managers such as a Municipal Engineer.

== Agriculture ==
The riverbank in the Haditha District is occupied by well irrigated farm plots that produce a large amount of food. Substantial sheep and goat flocks are also kept in the area. Further food sources come from fishing the river or the nearby Lake Qadisiya.

== Hydroelectric ==
Entering the Haditha Sub District, one is likely to see municipal signs illustrated with a water wheel. These are displayed as a reference to the area's history. Locals suggest that the ancient looking structures on or near the Euphrates River were part of a water wheel structure that dates back to a period of Roman occupation. They claim locals built water wheels to establish a limited aqueduct system similar to the one that served Rome. Whether or not soldiers or citizens of the Roman Empire ever resided in Haditha is an open question.

== History ==
The K-3 Pumping Station was built near the town in 1934, part of Iraq's first oil export pipeline, and the point at which the pipeline bifurcated.

=== Iraq War ===
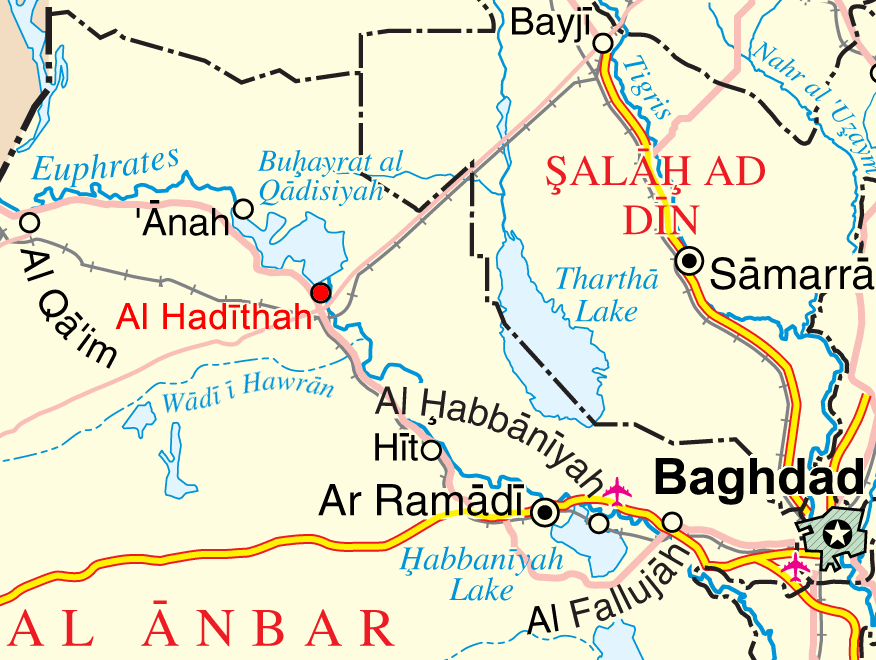
Haditha, Iraq and environs

The Haditha Dam and surrounding areas were initially secured by U.S. troops in April 2003 as part of the invasion of Iraq. An attack on the dam would have severely flooded towns along the Euphrates downstream from Haditha, as well as eliminating an important source of electricity.

On July 16, 2003 Mohammed Nayil Jurayfi, mayor of Haditha, and his youngest son, Ahmed, were assassinated.

In 2004, U.S. troops left a local police force in charge of the city and insurgents rounded up dozens of local police officers and publicly executed them in a soccer stadium.

In May 2005, U.S. forces launched Operation New Market in Haditha against the insurgents controlling the city. However, resistance continued. On August 1, 2005, an ambush killed 6 United States Marine snipers, (who were operating in two two-man teams with an additional marine per team for security) in the city; on August 3, a roadside bomb killed another 14 Marines and their interpreter. On August 26, another IED attack killed 7 Marines and injured 12.

According to an August 2005 report by The Guardian, the town was controlled by insurgents, with US forces making only fleeting visits every few months. Like Al-Qa'im, it had come under a Taliban-like rule, with Sharia law being imposed and Western-style items banned and insurgents collecting the salaries of government employees. This insurgent dominance continued into 2006.

The mayor of Haditha in November 2005 was Emad Jawad Hamza.

==== 2005 Haditha massacre ====
On 19 November 2005, 25 Iraqi noncombatants, including 11 women and children, were killed by 12 Marines from 3rd Battalion, 1st Marines. The US military subsequently investigated the massacre, and a captain and a lieutenant colonel were relieved of duty (another captain was relieved on the same day but not for the same incident.) Some allege the massacre was in retribution for an incident earlier in the day in which US Marine Lance Corporal Miguel Terrazas was killed in a roadside bomb attack on Marines from Kilo Company. In August 2006 a commission reviewing the killings found probable cause for charging the Marines. The same day, one of the accused Marines sued Rep. John P. Murtha (D-Pa.) for libel because of Murtha's characterization of the incident saying the Marines killed the civilians "in cold blood." In 2009, a federal appeals court ruled that Murtha was immune from the lawsuit because he was acting in his official role as a lawmaker when he made the comments to reporters.

A court-martial on June 4, 2008 acquitted a US Marine, Lieutenant Andrew Grayson, for any role in covering up the killings, while charges were dropped against five other marines in the affair. Grayson had not been present for the incident, but had been accused of telling a sergeant to delete photographs of the victims.

Lt Colonel Jeffrey Chessani, the highest-ranking officer accused over the incident, had been charged with dereliction of duty for failing to order a war crimes investigation into the killings. The charges were dismissed in 2008 on the grounds General James Mattis, who was responsible for overseeing the prosecutions, had been unduly influenced by his top legal aide, then-Colonel John Ewers, who had been the investigator into the incident. The dismissal was later upheld on appeal.

Squad leader Frank Wuterich, who had been accused of leading the killings, was charged with voluntary manslaughter and assault. In 2012, he made a plea agreement which dropped these charges. In exchange, he pled guilty to one count of dereliction of duty for telling his squad to "shoot first and ask questions later," and was demoted to the rank of private. The plea agreement caused anger in Iraq, with the Iraqi government saying it "did not fit the crime" and that they would look for other legal avenues they could pursue.

=== Recovery and rebuilding ===
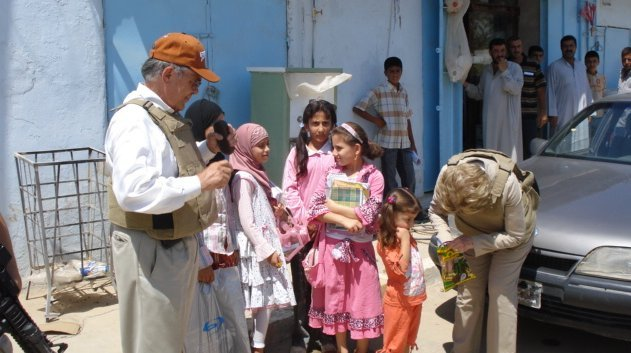
Congressional delegation meets the people on the streets of Hadithah

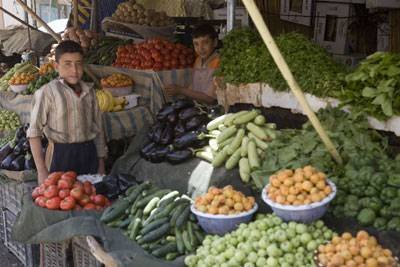
Vegetable stand in Haditha

The change in U.S. strategy in late 2006 brought quick results to the Hadithah Triad. The U.S. Marines and their Iraqi and coalition allies had largely driven out insurgents by the summer of 2007.

Hadithah was much more secure and had recovered some of its prosperity by the summer of 2008. The progress was evident when an American Congressional Delegation visited the town in August and found full shops and friendly people.

With this turbulent history the future was unpredictable. However, according to the website of Multi National Forces – Iraq, progress began after a large berm was erected around the cities of Haditha and Haqlaniyah on the western side of the Euphrates and Barwannah on the East side during Operation Al Majid.

Marine units rotated in and out of the area detaining numerous persons. Iraqi Police were firmly established by 2007 and violence fell. In contrast to previous years, the Ramadan period of 2007 came and went in Haditha with no insurgent attacks.

In the next few months two bridges across the Euphrates were rebuilt, the area hospital was reopened and re-equipped, the K3 oil refinery south of the area was brought back online, and life began to take on the air of normalcy.

Also planned are keeping the hydro-electric dam functioning and rebuilding capacity with the help of US led coalition forces, re-opening a local oil refinery with significant funding and technical advice from Coalition forces and provincial reconstruction teams headquartered in Ramadi and Al Asad, rebuilding two dams over the Euphrates River, manning a large police force, establishing regular ambulance service, re-equipping and running the hospital, opening an asphalt factory, re-opening schools with basic refurbishments complete, filling the offices of the local government, expanding local markets, and rebuilding a local marble factory.

=== War with ISIL ===
In early 2014, ISIL launched a successful campaign to seize around 70% of Anbar province from Iraq. Haditha is notable for being one of the few towns that remained under the control of Iraqi forces despite being more than 200 kilometres from Baghdad. In September 2014, ISIL attacked the dam but were repelled by airstrikes. As of May 2016, it remains one of the most exclusively Sunni Arab towns of Iraq under control of the government.

Al Jazeera's Iraq editor Hamed Hadeed said Haditha plays a major role in the country's conflict because of its strategic location and unparalleled resistance to ISIL: "Haditha serves as a significant transportation route between the western regions of Anbar, the central province of Salahuddin, and northern governorate of Nineveh. It is also the only city in Anbar province that has been able to block IS's repeated attempts to control it."

== Climate ==
Haditha has a hot desert climate (Köppen climate classification BWh). Most rain falls in the winter. The average annual temperature in Haditha is 21.1 °C (70.0 °F). About 127 mm (5.00 in) of precipitation falls annually.

Climate data for Haditha
Month	Jan	Feb	Mar	Apr	May	Jun	Jul	Aug	Sep	Oct	Nov	Dec	Year
Mean daily maximum °C (°F)	12.5 (54.5)	16.6 (61.9)	21.6 (70.9)	27.4 (81.3)	34.5 (94.1)	39.5 (103.1)	41.9 (107.4)	41.8 (107.2)	38.7 (101.7)	32.1 (89.8)	22.6 (72.7)	14.6 (58.3)	28.7 (83.6)
Mean daily minimum °C (°F)	2.4 (36.3)	3.6 (38.5)	8.1 (46.6)	13.2 (55.8)	18.3 (64.9)	22.3 (72.1)	24.9 (76.8)	24.4 (75.9)	20.5 (68.9)	14.9 (58.8)	7.5 (45.5)	3.6 (38.5)	13.6 (56.5)
Average precipitation mm (inches)	22 (0.9)	18 (0.7)	15 (0.6)	19 (0.7)	3 (0.1)	0 (0)	0 (0)	0 (0)	0 (0)	9 (0.4)	17 (0.7)	24 (0.9)	127 (5.0)
Source: Climate-Data.org, Climate data

== Notable people ==
- Mithal al-Alusi (born 1953), politician
- Kamal al-Hadithi, (1939 – 2018) poet, journalist and politician.
- Mar Mari Emmanuel (born 1970), an Assyrian bishop in Australia.
