= Neysan Rural District =

Rural district in Khuzestan province, Iran

Neysan Rural District Persian: دهستان نيسان
- Rural District
- Location within Iran
- Coordinates: 31°35′49″N 47°55′47″E
- Country: Iran
- Province: Khuzestan
- County: Hoveyzeh
- District: Neysan
- Capital: Bani Naameh-ye Shomali

Population (2016)
  - Total: 1,936
- Time zone: UTC+3:30 (IRST)

Neysan Rural District (Persian: دهستان نيسان) is in Neysan District of Hoveyzeh County, Khuzestan province, Iran. Its capital is the village of Bani Naameh-ye Shomali.

== Demographics ==
=== Population ===
At the time of the 2006 National Census, the rural district's population (as part of the former Hoveyzeh District of Dasht-e Azadegan County) was 1,699 in 216 households. There were 2,028 inhabitants in 414 households at the following census of 2011, by which time the district had been separated from the county in the establishment of Hoveyzeh County. The rural district was transferred to the new Neysan District. The 2016 census measured the population of the rural district as 1,936 in 475 households. The most populous of its 29 villages was Bani Naameh-ye Shomali, with 599 people.
