= Hoveyzeh District =

Former district in Khuzestan province, Iran

Hoveyzeh District Persian: بخش هویزه
- Former District
- Location within Iran
- Coordinates: 31°20′50″N 48°01′00″E
- Country: Iran
- Province: Khuzestan
- County: Dasht-e Azadegan
- Capital: Hoveyzeh

Population (2006)
  - Total: 30,750
- Time zone: UTC+3:30 (IRST)

Hoveyzeh District (Persian: بخش هویزه) is a former administrative division of Dasht-e Azadegan County, Khuzestan province, Iran. Its capital was the city of Hoveyzeh.

== History ==
After the 2006 National Census, the district was separated from the county in the establishment of Hoveyzeh County.

== Demographics ==
=== Population ===
At the time of the 2006 census, the district's population was 30,750 in 5,417 households.

=== Administrative divisions ===
Hoveyzeh District Population
Administrative Divisions	2006
Bani Saleh RD	2,718
Hoveyzeh RD (Note: Renamed Hoveyzeh-ye Jonubi Rural District)	8,101
Neysan RD	1,699
Hoveyzeh (city)	14,422
Rafi (city)	3,810
Total	30,750
RD = Rural District
