= Bani Saleh Rural District =

Rural district in Khuzestan province, Iran

Bani Saleh Rural District Persian: دهستان بني صالح
- Rural District
- Location within Iran
- Coordinates: 31°17′04″N 47°53′45″E
- Country: Iran
- Province: Khuzestan
- County: Hoveyzeh
- District: Neysan
- Capital: Yazd-e Now

Population (2016)
  - Total: 4,327
- Time zone: UTC+3:30 (IRST)

Bani Saleh Rural District (Persian: دهستان بني صالح) is in Neysan District of Hoveyzeh County, Khuzestan province, Iran. Its capital is the village of Yazd-e Now.

== Demographics ==
=== Population ===
At the time of the 2006 National Census, the rural district's population (as a part of the former Hoveyzeh District of Dasht-e Azadegan County) was 2,718 in 488 households. There were 3,342 inhabitants in 683 households at the following census of 2011, by which time the district had been separated from the county in the establishment of Hoveyzeh County. The rural district was transferred to the new Neysan District. The 2016 census measured the population of the rural district as 4,327 in 831 households. The most populous of its 54 villages was Abu Akfa, with 735 people.
