= Neysan District =

District in Khuzestan province, Iran

Neysan District Persian: بخش نيسان
- District
- Location within Iran
- Coordinates: 31°20′20″N 47°53′45″E
- Country: Iran
- Province: Khuzestan
- County: Hoveyzeh
- Capital: Rafi

Population (2016)
  - Total: 10,060
- Time zone: UTC+3:30 (IRST)

Neysan District (Persian: بخش نيسان) is in Hoveyzeh County, Khuzestan province, Iran. Its capital is the city of Rafi.

== History ==
After the 2006 National Census, Hoveyzeh District was separated from Dasht-e Azadegan County in the establishment of Hoveyzeh County, which was divided into two districts of two rural districts each, with the city of Hoveyzeh as its capital.

== Demographics ==
=== Population ===
At the time of the 2011 census, the district's population was 9,060 people in 1,916 households. The 2016 census measured the population of the district as 10,060 inhabitants in 2,312 households.

=== Administrative divisions ===
Neysan District Population
Administrative Divisions	2011	2016
Bani Saleh RD	3,342	4,327
Neysan RD	2,028	1,936
Rafi (city)	3,690	3,797
Total	9,060	10,060
RD = Rural District
