= Hoveyzeh-ye Jonubi Rural District =

Rural district in Khuzestan province, Iran

Hoveyzeh-ye Jonubi Rural District Persian: دهستان هویزه جنوبی
- Rural District
- Location within Iran
- Coordinates: 31°19′52″N 48°08′37″E
- Country: Iran
- Province: Khuzestan
- County: Hoveyzeh
- District: Central
- Capital: Saidiyeh

Population (2016)
  - Total: 5,738
- Time zone: UTC+3:30 (IRST)

Hoveyzeh-ye Jonubi Rural District (Persian: دهستان هویزه جنوبی) (Note: Formerly Hoveyzeh Rural District (دهستان هویزه)) is in the Central District of Hoveyzeh County, Khuzestan province, Iran. Its capital is the village of Saidiyeh.

== Demographics ==
=== Population ===
At the time of the 2006 National Census, the rural district's population (as Hoveyzeh Rural District (Note: Renamed Hoveyzeh-ye Jonubi Rural District) of the former Hoveyzeh District of Dasht-e Azadegan County) was 8,101 in 1,333 households. There were 5,568 inhabitants in 1,187 households at the following census of 2011, by which time the district had been separated from the county in the establishment of Hoveyzeh County. The rural district was transferred to the new Central District and renamed Hoveyzeh-ye Jonubi Rural District. The 2016 census measured the population of the rural district as 5,738 in 1,391 households. The most populous of its 38 villages was Qeysariyeh-ye Olya, with 497 people.
