= Central District (Hoveyzeh County) =

District in Khuzestan province, Iran

Central District (Hoveyzeh County) Persian: بخش مرکزی شهرستان هویزه
- District
- Location within Iran
- Coordinates: 31°21′27″N 48°08′17″E
- Country: Iran
- Province: Khuzestan
- County: Hoveyzeh
- Capital: Hoveyzeh

Population (2016)
  - Total: 28,826
- Time zone: UTC+3:30 (IRST)

The Central District of Hoveyzeh County (Persian: بخش مرکزی شهرستان هویزه) is in Khuzestan province, Iran. Its capital is the city of Hoveyzeh.

== History ==
After the 2006 National Census, Hoveyzeh District was separated from Dasht-e Azadegan County in the establishment of Hoveyzeh County, which was divided into two districts of two rural districts each, with Hoveyzeh as its capital.

== Demographics ==
=== Population ===
At the time of the 2011 census, the district's population was 25,252 people in 5,727 households. The 2016 census measured the population of the district as 28,826 inhabitants in 7,137 households.

=== Administrative divisions ===
Central District (Hoveyzeh County) Population
Administrative Divisions	2011	2016
Hoveyzeh-ye Jonubi RD (Note: Formerly Hoveyzeh Rural District)	5,568	5,738
Hoveyzeh-ye Shomali RD	3,530	3,607
Hoveyzeh (city)	16,154	19,481
Total	25,252	28,826
RD = Rural District
