= Hoveyzeh County =

County in Khuzestan province, Iran

Hoveyzeh County Persian: شهرستان هویزه
- County
- Location of Hoveyzeh County in Khuzestan province (left, green)

- Location of Khuzestan province in Iran
- Coordinates: 31°20′50″N 48°01′00″E
- Country: Iran
- Province: Khuzestan
- Capital: Hoveyzeh
- Districts: Central, Neysan

Population (2016)
  - Total: 38,886
- Time zone: UTC+3:30 (IRST)

Hoveyzeh County (Persian: شهرستان هویزه and Arabic: مقاطعة الحويزة) is in Khuzestan province, Iran. Its capital is the city of Hoveyzeh. Hoveyzeh is considered among the famous counties of Iran because of the Iran-Iraq War. It is located near the border with Iraq.

== History ==
After the 2006 National Census, Hoveyzeh District was separated from Dasht-e Azadegan County in the establishment of Hoveyzeh County, which was divided into two districts of two rural districts each, with Hoveyzeh as its capital.

== Demographics ==
=== Language and ethnicity ===
The county's citizens are considered among Khuzestani Arab people.

=== Population ===
At the time of the 2011 census, the county's population was 34,312 people in 7,600 households. The 2016 census measured the population of the county as 38,886 in 9,449 households.

=== Administrative divisions ===
Hoveyzeh County's population history and administrative structure over two consecutive censuses are shown in the following table.

Hoveyzeh County Population
Administrative Divisions	2011	2016
Central District	25,252	28,826
Hoveyzeh-ye Jonubi RD (Note: Formerly Hoveyzeh Rural District)	5,568	5,738
Hoveyzeh-ye Shomali RD	3,530	3,607
Hoveyzeh (city)	16,154	19,481
Neysan District	9,060	10,060
Bani Saleh RD	3,342	4,327
Neysan RD	2,028	1,936
Rafi (city)	3,690	3,797
Total	34,312	38,886
RD = Rural District

== See also ==
Media related to Hoveyzeh County at Wikimedia Commons
