= Bostan =

Bostan, Bustan, Boustan or Boostan (from Persian بستان 'garden') may refer to:

== Places ==
=== Iran ===
- Shahrak-e Bostan, Fars province
- Bostan, Isfahan, Isfahan province
- Bostan, Kerman, Kerman province
- Bostan, Iran, Khuzestan province
  - Bostan District (Dasht-e Azadegan County), Khuzestan province
  - Bostan Rural District (Khuzestan Province)
- Bustan, Kohgiluyeh and Boyer-Ahmad
- Bustan-e Kuchek, Kohgiluyeh and Boyer-Ahmad province
- Bostan Rural District (Khaf County), Razavi Khorasan province
- Boustan Street, Tehran, renamed Nimr Baqir al-Nimr Street in 2016
- Bostan District (Baharestan County), Tehran province

=== Kyrgyzstan ===
- Boston, Nooken, Nooken District, Jalal-Abad Region
- Boston, Suzak, Suzak District, Jalal-Abad Region
- Boston, Osh, Özgön District, Osh Region

=== Oman ===
- Al-Bustan, Oman, Muscat, eastern Oman

=== Pakistan ===
- Bostan, Pishin, Balochistan
- Bostan, Sibi, Balochistan

=== Palestine / Israel ===
- Al Bustan, Arabic term for King's Garden, Jerusalem

=== Saudi Arabia ===
- Al Bustan, Saudi Arabia, village in Al Madinah Province, western Saudi Arabia

=== Syria ===
- Al-Bustan, Syria, a village in the Masyaf Subdistrict in Masyaf District, west of Hama, Syria
- Bustan al-Basha, a village in Latakia Governorate, along the Mediterranean coastline, northern Syria

=== Uzbekistan ===
- Bo‘ston, Karakalpakstan
- Bo‘ston, Jizzakh Region

Greece

- Bostani (Μποστάνι)

== People ==
- Bostan Karim (also Bostan Qaseem, born c. 1970), a citizen of Afghanistan
- Elisabeta Bostan (born 1931), Romanian film director
- Ion Bostan (film director) (1914–1992), Romanian film director
- Ion Bostan (academic) (born 1949), Moldovan researcher

== Other ==
- Boostan, a Persian carpet masterwork
- Boustan, a Lebanese-Canadian fast food restaurant chain in Montreal, Quebec
- Bustan (book), by the Persian poet Saadi
- Būstān al-jāmiʿ, an anonymous medieval Arabic chronicle
- Bustan (organization), a joint Israeli–Palestinian non-governmental organization
- Bustan Birke, an archaeological site in Lebanon
- Taq Bostan, a series of rock reliefs in Iran

== See also ==
- Al Bustan (disambiguation)
- Bostan Rural District (disambiguation)
- Bostanabad (disambiguation)
- Boston (disambiguation)
- Basatin (disambiguation), the plural form of bostan
- Boustani, a family of Lebanese origin
- Lashkargah, Afghanistan, historically known as Bost
