= Boston (disambiguation) =

Boston is a city, the state capital of Massachusetts, United States.

Boston may also refer to:

== Places ==
=== Canada ===
- Boston, Ontario, an unincorporated area in Norfolk County
- Boston Creek, a community in Unorganized West Timiskaming District, Ontario
- Boston Mills, Ontario

=== Ireland ===
- Boston, County Clare, a village
- Boston, County Laois, a townland in County Laois

=== Kyrgyzstan ===
- Boston, Nooken, a village in Nooken District, Jalal-Abad Region
- Boston, Suzak, a village in Suzak District, Jalal-Abad Region
- Boston, Osh, a village in Özgön District, Osh Region

=== United Kingdom ===
- Boston, Lincolnshire, England, a market town and inland port
  - Boston (UK Parliament constituency), a former parliamentary borough
  - Borough of Boston, a local government district
- Boston Manor House, a Jacobean house in West London

=== United States ===
- Boston, Georgia, a city
- Boston, Indiana, a town
- Boston, Kentucky, a census-designated place
- Boston, Louisville, Kentucky, a neighborhood
- Boston, Massachusetts, a city and metropolis
- Boston, Missouri, an unincorporated community
- Boston, New York, a town
- Boston, Belmont County, Ohio, an unincorporated community
- Boston, Highland County, Ohio, an unincorporated community
- Boston, Licking County, Ohio, an unincorporated community
- Boston, Summit County, Ohio, an unincorporated community
- Boston, Pennsylvania, a census-designated place
- Boston, Texas, an unincorporated community
- Boston, Accomack County, Virginia, a census-designated place
- Boston, Culpeper and Rappahannock Counties, Virginia, an unincorporated community
- Boston Mountains, in Arkansas and Oklahoma
- Boston Township (disambiguation)

=== Uzbekistan ===
- Boʻston, a town in Karakalpakstan
- Boʻston, Jizzakh Region, a town in Jizzakh Region

=== Elsewhere ===
- Boston, South Australia, Australia
- Boston, Belize, a village
- Ebon Atoll or Boston, Marshall Islands
- Boston, Davao Oriental, a municipality in the Philippines
- Boston, KwaZulu-Natal, South Africa, a town
- Boston, Suriname, a settlement

== People ==
- Boston (surname)
- Boston (given name)
- Boston (Hasidic dynasty), founded in Boston in the early 20th century

== Arts and entertainment ==
=== Fictional characters ===
- Boston Blackie, in literature, films, radio and television
- Boston Brand, real name of the comics character Deadman
- Boston Arliss Crab, in the TV series Blindspot
- Boston Low, protagonist of the video game The Dig

=== Games ===
- Boston (card game), an 18th-century card game
- Eight-ball or Boston, a pocket billiards game
- Boston, winning or bidding to win every trick in a round of Bid whist

=== Music ===
- Boston (band), an American rock band
  - Boston (album), the band's 1976 debut album
- "Boston" (Augustana song), 2006
- "Boston" (Stella Lefty song), 2026
- Boston Blackie (guitarist), stage name of American musician Benjamin Houston (1943–1993)
- Boston, a brand of piano designed by Steinway & Sons

=== Other media ===
- Boston (dance), a number of waltz-type dances
- Boston (novel), a 1928 work by Upton Sinclair
- "Boston", an unaired episode of Aqua Teen Hunger Force
- Boston (magazine), a monthly publication about life in the Greater Boston (Massachusetts) area
- Boston Magazine (1783–1786)

== Education ==
=== United Kingdom schools ===
- Boston College (England), a predominantly further education college in Boston, Lincolnshire, England
- Boston High School, a state school in England
- Boston Grammar School, a state school in England

=== United States schools ===
- Boston College, a private Jesuit university in Chestnut Hill, Massachusetts
- Boston University, a private research university in Boston, Massachusetts
- University of Massachusetts Boston, a public university in the University of Massachusetts system
- Boston Graduate School of Psychoanalysis, a graduate school in Brookline, Massachusetts
- Boston Architectural College, Boston, Massachusetts
- Boston Conservatory at Berklee, a music conservatory
- W. O. Boston High School, a former segregated American public high school in Lake Charles, Louisiana

== Transportation ==
- USS Boston, various US Navy ships
- Boston, a historical ship in British Columbia
- A-20 Boston, a World War II-era light bomber and night fighter made by the Douglas Aircraft Company
- Boston Camera, an airborne photo reconnaissance camera

== Sports ==
- Boston Bears (AFL), a team that competed in AFL III in 1940
- Boston Braves/Redskins, now the Washington Commanders
- Boston Breakers
- Boston Breakers (USFL) or Portland Breakers
- Boston Bruins, one of the original six National Hockey League teams
- Boston Bulldogs (AFL), a team that competed in AFL I in 1926
- Boston Celtics, a professional basketball team competing in NBA
- Boston City League, a high school athletic conference in Massachusetts
- Boston Patriots, a member of AFL IV (1960-1969) that currently competes in the National Football League as the New England Patriots
- Boston Red Sox, a Major League Baseball team based in Boston, Massachusetts
- Boston Shamrocks (AFL), a team that won the AFL II championship in 1936
- Boston United F.C., a National League football team based in Boston, Lincolnshire, England
- Boston Yanks, a National Football League team from 1944 to 1948
- Boston (horse), an American racehorse

== Other uses ==
- .boston, top-level Internet domain for Boston, Massachusetts
- Boston Consulting Group, a large management consulting organisation
- Microsoft Visual Studio 97 (Microsoft pre-release codename "Boston")
- "Boston the Bear", a geographic Beanie Baby honoring the city of Boston
- Boston Terrier, a dog breed
- Boston Blacking Company, now Bostik

== See also ==
- Boston Store (disambiguation)
- Boston, Mass. (album), by the Del Fuegos
- New Boston (disambiguation)
- South Boston (disambiguation)
- SS City of Boston, an ocean liner which disappeared without a trace in 1870
- Boston Bar, British Columbia, Canada, an unincorporated community
- Boston Spa, West Yorkshire, England, a village and civil parish
- Bostan (disambiguation)
- Bosten Lake, Xinjiang, China
- Bostin (disambiguation)
