= Hufel =

Hufel or Howfel or Hoofol or Hufal (Persian: هوفل) may refer to:

- Hufel, Izeh
- Hufel, Mahshahr
- Hufel-e Gharbi
- Hufel-e Seyyed Hamad
- Hufel-e Seyyed Khalaf
- Hufel-e Sharqi
