= Malekiyeh =

Malekiyeh (Persian: مالكيه) may refer to:

- Malekiyeh-ye Gharbi
- Malekiyeh-ye Olya
- Malekiyeh-ye Sofla
- Malekiyeh-ye Vosta
