= Kharabeh =

Kharabeh (Persian: خرابه) may refer to:

- Kharabeh, East Azerbaijan
- Kharabeh, Hormozgan
- Kharabeh, West Azerbaijan
- Kharabeh Amin
- Kharabeh-ye Chul Arkh
- Kharabeh-ye Kachal
- Kharabeh-ye Kohal
- Kharabeh-ye Qaderlu
- Kharabeh-ye Sadat
- Kharabeh-ye Senji
- Qaleh Kharabeh (disambiguation)
