= Seyyed Naser =

Seyyed Naser سيدناصر
- Village
- Location within Iran
- Coordinates: 31°36′58″N 48°08′07″E
- Country: Iran
- Province: Khuzestan
- County: Dasht-e Azadegan
- Bakhsh: Central
- Rural District: Allah-o Akbar

Population (2006)
  - Total: 189
- Time zone: UTC+3:30 (IRST)
  - Summer (DST): UTC+4:30 (IRDT)

Seyyed Naser (Persian: سيدناصر, also Romanized as Seyyed Nāşer) is a village in Allah-o Akbar Rural District, in the Central District of Dasht-e Azadegan County, Khuzestan Province, Iran. At the 2006 census, its population was 189, in 28 families.
