= Albu Sayyad =

Albu Sayyad البوصياد
- Village
- Location within Iran
- Coordinates: 31°30′14″N 48°25′54″E
- Country: Iran
- Province: Khuzestan
- County: Dasht-e Azadegan
- Bakhsh: Central
- Rural District: Allah-o Akbar

Population (2006)
  - Total: 410
- Time zone: UTC+3:30 (IRST)
  - Summer (DST): UTC+4:30 (IRDT)

Albu Sayyad (Persian: البوصياد, also Romanized as Ālbū Şayyād) is a village in Allah-o Akbar Rural District, in the Central District of Dasht-e Azadegan County, Khuzestan Province, Iran. At the 2006 census, its population was 410, in 80 families.
