= Soveydani =

Soveydani سويداني
- Village
- Location within Iran
- Coordinates: 31°33′53″N 48°05′16″E
- Country: Iran
- Province: Khuzestan
- County: Dasht-e Azadegan
- Bakhsh: Central
- Rural District: Howmeh-ye Gharbi

Population (2006)
  - Total: 616
- Time zone: UTC+3:30 (IRST)
  - Summer (DST): UTC+4:30 (IRDT)

Soveydani (Persian: سويداني, also Romanized as Soveydānī) is a village in Howmeh-ye Gharbi Rural District, in the Central District of Dasht-e Azadegan County, Khuzestan Province, Iran. At the 2006 census, its population was 616, in 88 families.
