= Dafar-e Olya =

Dafar-e Olya دفارعليا
- Village
- Location within Iran
- Coordinates: 31°40′52″N 47°57′56″E
- Country: Iran
- Province: Khuzestan
- County: Dasht-e Azadegan
- Bakhsh: Bostan
- Rural District: Bostan

Population (2006)
  - Total: 64
- Time zone: UTC+3:30 (IRST)
  - Summer (DST): UTC+4:30 (IRDT)

Dafar-e Olya (Persian: دفارعليا, also Romanized as Dafār-e 'Olyā; also known as Dafār) is a village in Bostan Rural District, Bostan District, Dasht-e Azadegan County, Khuzestan province, Iran. At the 2006 census, its population was 64, in 9 families.
