= Abeyyat =

Obeyyat عبيات
- Village
- Location within Iran
- Coordinates: 31°42′24″N 48°01′22″E
- Country: Iran
- Province: Khuzestan
- County: Dasht-e Azadegan
- Bakhsh: Bostan
- Rural District: Bostan

Population (2006)
  - Total: 195
- Time zone: UTC+3:30 (IRST)
  - Summer (DST): UTC+4:30 (IRDT)

Obeyyat (Persian: عبيات, also Romanized as ‘Obeyyāt; also known as ‘Obeyd) is a village in Bostan Rural District, Bostan District, Dasht-e Azadegan County, Khuzestan Province, Iran. At the 2006 census, its population was 195, in 27 families.
