= Firuzabad, Dasht-e Azadegan =

Firuzabad فيروزاباد
- Village
- Location within Iran
- Coordinates: 31°41′31″N 48°02′36″E
- Country: Iran
- Province: Khuzestan
- County: Dasht-e Azadegan
- Bakhsh: Bostan
- Rural District: Bostan

Population (2006)
  - Total: 162
- Time zone: UTC+3:30 (IRST)
  - Summer (DST): UTC+4:30 (IRDT)

Firuzabad (Persian: فيروزاباد, also Romanized as Fīrūzābād; also known as Fīrūzābād-e Fenīkhī) is a village in Bostan Rural District, Bostan District, Dasht-e Azadegan County, Khuzestan Province, Iran. At the 2006 census, its population was 162, in 24 families.
