= Albu Afri =

Albu Afri البوعفري
- Village
- Location within Iran
- Coordinates: 31°32′39″N 48°08′05″E
- Country: Iran
- Province: Khuzestan
- County: Dasht-e Azadegan
- Bakhsh: Central
- Rural District: Howmeh-ye Gharbi

Population (2006)
  - Total: 758
- Time zone: UTC+3:30 (IRST)
  - Summer (DST): UTC+4:30 (IRDT)

Albu Afri (Persian: البوعفري, also Romanized as Ālbū ‘Afrī; also known as Ālbū ‘Afrī-ye Shomālī) is a village in Howmeh-ye Gharbi Rural District, in the Central District of Dasht-e Azadegan County, Khuzestan Province, Iran. At the 2006 census, its population was 758, in 110 families.
