= Boštjan =

Boštjan or Bostjan is a given name. Notable people with the name include:

- Boštjan Buč (born 1980), Slovenian retired track athlete
- Boštjan Burger (born 1966), Slovenian informatician, geographer, panoramic photographer and speleologist
- Boštjan Čadež creator of Line Rider, an internet game
- Boštjan Cesar (born 1982), Slovenian international footballer
- Boštjan Frelih (born 1993), Slovenian footballer
- Bostjan Goličič (born 1989), Slovenian ice hockey player
- Boštjan Hladnik (1929–2006), Yugoslavian/Slovene filmmaker
- Boštjan Kavaš (born 1978), professional handball player
- Boštjan Kline (born 1991), Slovenian alpine ski racer
- Boštjan Krelj (1538–1567), Slovene Protestant reformer, writer, pastor, linguist and preacher
- Boštjan Lipovšek (born 1974), Slovenian classical horn player
- Boštjan Maček (born 1972), sport shooter competing in trap
- Boštjan Nachbar (born 1980), Slovenian professional basketball player
- Boštjan Šimunič (born 1974), retired Slovenian triple jumper
- Boštjan Žitnik (born 1971), Yugoslav-born, Slovenian slalom canoeist who competed from the mid-1980s to the mid-1990s
- Boštjan Žnuderl (born 1979), Slovenian football midfielder
- Boštjan Zupančič (born 1947), Judge at the European Court of Human Rights in Strasbourg, France since 1998

== See also ==
- Haji Abad Bostjan, a village in Howmeh Rural District, in the Central District of Damghan County, Semnan Province, Iran
- Sveti Boštjan, a small village on the Drava River in the Municipality of Dravograd in the Carinthia region in northern Slovenia
- Bosta (disambiguation)
- Bostan (disambiguation)
- Ostan (disambiguation)
