= Jorgeh-ye Seyyed Ali =

Jorgeh-ye Seyyed Ali جرگه سيدعلي
- Village
- Location within Iran
- Coordinates: 31°29′49″N 48°19′05″E
- Country: Iran
- Province: Khuzestan
- County: Dasht-e Azadegan
- Bakhsh: Central
- Rural District: Howmeh-ye Sharqi

Population (2006)
  - Total: 459
- Time zone: UTC+3:30 (IRST)
  - Summer (DST): UTC+4:30 (IRDT)

Jorgeh-ye Seyyed Ali (Persian: جرگه سيدعلي, also Romanized as Jorgeh-ye Seyyed ‘Alī and Jargeh-ye Seyyed ‘Alī; also known as Jargeh and Jorgeh) is a village in Howmeh-ye Sharqi Rural District, in the Central District of Dasht-e Azadegan County, Khuzestan Province, Iran. At the 2006 census, its population was 459, in 99 families.
