= Sheykh Saleh, Dasht-e Azadegan =

Sheykh Saleh شيخ صالح
- Village
- Country: Iran
- Province: Khuzestan
- County: Dasht-e Azadegan
- Bakhsh: Central
- Rural District: Allah-o Akbar

Population (2006)
  - Total: 937
- Time zone: UTC+3:30 (IRST)
  - Summer (DST): UTC+4:30 (IRDT)

Sheykh Saleh (Persian: شيخ صالح, also Romanized as Sheykh Şāleḥ) is a village in Allah-o Akbar Rural District, in the Central District of Dasht-e Azadegan County, Khuzestan Province, Iran. At the 2006 census, its population was 937, in 120 families.
