= Shakeriyeh =

Shakeriyeh شاكريه
- Village
- Location within Iran
- Coordinates: 31°33′05″N 48°15′36″E
- Country: Iran
- Province: Khuzestan
- County: Dasht-e Azadegan
- Bakhsh: Central
- Rural District: Allah-o Akbar

Population (2006)
  - Total: 636
- Time zone: UTC+3:30 (IRST)
  - Summer (DST): UTC+4:30 (IRDT)

Shakeriyeh (Persian: شاكريه, also Romanized as Shākerīyeh) is a village in Allah-o Akbar Rural District, in the Central District of Dasht-e Azadegan County, Khuzestan Province, Iran. At the 2006 census, its population was 636, in 105 families.
