= Kesar, Khuzestan =

Kesar كسر
- Village
- Location within Iran
- Coordinates: 31°41′15″N 47°54′27″E
- Country: Iran
- Province: Khuzestan
- County: Dasht-e Azadegan
- Bakhsh: Bostan
- Rural District: Saidiyeh

Population (2006)
  - Total: 76
- Time zone: UTC+3:30 (IRST)
  - Summer (DST): UTC+4:30 (IRDT)

Kesar (Persian: كسر, also Romanized as Kesār) is a village in Saidiyeh Rural District, Bostan District, Dasht-e Azadegan County, Khuzestan Province, Iran. According to the 2006 census, its population was 76, in 10 families.
