= Magasis =

Magasis مگاصيص
- Village
- Location within Iran
- Coordinates: 31°34′24″N 48°03′27″E
- Country: Iran
- Province: Khuzestan
- County: Dasht-e Azadegan
- Bakhsh: Central
- Rural District: Howmeh-ye Gharbi

Population (2006)
  - Total: 584
- Time zone: UTC+3:30 (IRST)
  - Summer (DST): UTC+4:30 (IRDT)

Magasis (Persian: مگاصيص, also Romanized as Magāşīş and Magāsīs) is a village in Howmeh-ye Gharbi Rural District, in the Central District of Dasht-e Azadegan County, Khuzestan Province, Iran. At the 2006 census, its population was 584, in 86 families.
