= Fenikhi =

Fenikhi فنيخي
- Village
- Location within Iran
- Coordinates: 31°41′12″N 48°01′16″E
- Country: Iran
- Province: Khuzestan
- County: Dasht-e Azadegan
- Bakhsh: Bostan
- Rural District: Bostan

Population (2006)
  - Total: 251
- Time zone: UTC+3:30 (IRST)
  - Summer (DST): UTC+4:30 (IRDT)

Fenikhi (Persian: فنيخي, also Romanized as Fenīkhī, Faneykhī, and Fanikhi; also known as Fīnkhī-ye Kūchak) is a village in Bostan Rural District, Bostan District, Dasht-e Azadegan County, Khuzestan Province, Iran. According to the 2006 census, its population was 251, in 39 families.
