= Abu Jalal-e Jonubi =

Abu Jalal-e Jonubi ابوجلال جنوبي
- Village
- Location within Iran
- Coordinates: 31°33′23″N 48°10′19″E
- Country: Iran
- Province: Khuzestan
- County: Dasht-e Azadegan
- Bakhsh: Central
- Rural District: Howmeh-ye Gharbi

Population (2006)
  - Total: 72
- Time zone: UTC+3:30 (IRST)
  - Summer (DST): UTC+4:30 (IRDT)

Abu Jalal-e Jonubi (Persian: ابوجلال جنوبي, also Romanized as Abū Jalāl-e Jonūbī and Abū Jalāl-e Janūbī) is a village in Howmeh-ye Gharbi Rural District, in the Central District of Dasht-e Azadegan County, Khuzestan Province, Iran. At the 2006 census, its population was 72, in 13 families.
