= Jalizi-ye Abdolreza =

Jalizi-ye Abdolreza جليزي عبدالرضا
- Village
- Country: Iran
- Province: Khuzestan
- County: Dasht-e Azadegan
- Bakhsh: Central
- Rural District: Allah-o Akbar

Population (2006)
  - Total: 1,432
- Time zone: UTC+3:30 (IRST)
  - Summer (DST): UTC+4:30 (IRDT)

Jalizi-ye Abdolreza (Persian: جليزي عبدالرضا, also Romanized as Jalīzī-ye ʿAbdolrez̤ā) is a village in Allah-o Akbar Rural District, in the Central District of Dasht-e Azadegan County, Khuzestan Province, Iran. At the 2006 census, its population was 1,432, in 263 families.
