= Sheybani, Dasht-e Azadegan =

Sheybani شيباني
- Village
- Country: Iran
- Province: Khuzestan
- County: Dasht-e Azadegan
- Bakhsh: Central
- Rural District: Howmeh-ye Sharqi

Population (2006)
  - Total: 376
- Time zone: UTC+3:30 (IRST)
  - Summer (DST): UTC+4:30 (IRDT)

Sheybani (Persian: شيباني, also Romanized as Sheybānī) is a village in Howmeh-ye Sharqi Rural District, in the Central District of Dasht-e Azadegan County, Khuzestan Province, Iran. At the 2006 census, its population was 376, in 73 families.
