= Albu Afri-ye Jonubi =

Albu Afri-ye Jonubi البوعفري جنوبي
- Village
- Location within Iran
- Coordinates: 31°31′20″N 48°08′26″E
- Country: Iran
- Province: Khuzestan
- County: Dasht-e Azadegan
- Bakhsh: Central
- Rural District: Howmeh-ye Sharqi

Population (2006)
  - Total: 413
- Time zone: UTC+3:30 (IRST)
  - Summer (DST): UTC+4:30 (IRDT)

Albu Afri-ye Jonubi (Persian: البوعفري جنوبي, also Romanized as Ālbū ‘Afrī-ye Jonūbī) is a village in Howmeh-ye Sharqi Rural District, in the Central District of Dasht-e Azadegan County, Khuzestan Province, Iran. At the 2006 census, its population was 413, in 79 families.
