= Dahimi =

Dahimi (Persian: دحيمي) may refer to:

- Dahimi 1 (disambiguation)
- Dahimi 2 (disambiguation)
- Dahimi 3
