= Hamud-e Asi =

Hamud-e Asi حمودعاصي
- Village
- Location within Iran
- Coordinates: 31°38′56″N 48°05′18″E
- Country: Iran
- Province: Khuzestan
- County: Dasht-e Azadegan
- Bakhsh: Bostan
- Rural District: Bostan

Population (2006)
  - Total: 129
- Time zone: UTC+3:30 (IRST)
  - Summer (DST): UTC+4:30 (IRDT)

Hamud-e Asi (Persian: حمودعاصي, also Romanized as Ḩamūd-e ‘Āşī and Ḩamūd ‘Āşī; also known as Abr Fūsh) is a village in Bostan Rural District, Bostan District, Dasht-e Azadegan County, Khuzestan Province, Iran. At the 2006 census, its population was 129, in 18 families.
