= Jalaliyeh =

Jalaliyeh or Jalalieh (Persian: جلاليه) may refer to:

- Jalaliyeh, Ardabil
- Jalaliyeh, Kerman
- Jalaliyeh Jonubi, Khuzestan Province
- Jalaliyeh Shomali, Khuzestan Province
- Jalalieh, Razavi Khorasan
