= Seyyed Amer, Dasht-e Azadegan =

Seyyed Amer سيدعامر
- Village
- Location within Iran
- Coordinates: 31°29′47″N 48°19′30″E
- Country: Iran
- Province: Khuzestan
- County: Dasht-e Azadegan
- Bakhsh: Central
- Rural District: Allah-o Akbar

Population (2006)
  - Total: 234
- Time zone: UTC+3:30 (IRST)
  - Summer (DST): UTC+4:30 (IRDT)

Seyyed Amer (Persian: سيدعامر, also Romanized as Seyyed ‘Āmer; also known as Jorgeh Sed ‘Amer, Jorgeh-ye Seyyed ‘Āmer-e Ţāleqānī, and Seyyed ‘Āmer-e Ţāleqānī) is a village in Allah-o Akbar Rural District, in the Central District of Dasht-e Azadegan County, Khuzestan Province, Iran. At the 2006 census, its population was 234, in 41 families.
