= Machriyeh =

Machriyeh or Mochriyeh (Persian: مچريه), also rendered as Mojriyeh, may refer to:

- Machriyeh, Dasht-e Azadegan
- Mochriyeh, Shushtar
