= Kharabeh-ye Sadat =

Kharabeh-ye Sadat خرابه سادات
- Village
- Country: Iran
- Province: Khuzestan
- County: Dasht-e Azadegan
- Bakhsh: Bostan
- Rural District: Saidiyeh

Population (2006)
  - Total: 59
- Time zone: UTC+3:30 (IRST)
  - Summer (DST): UTC+4:30 (IRDT)

Kharabeh-ye Sadat (Persian: خرابه سادات, also Romanized as Kharābeh-ye Sādāt) is a village in Saidiyeh Rural District, Bostan District, Dasht-e Azadegan County, Khuzestan Province, Iran. At the 2006 census, its population was 59, in 9 families.
