= Dahimi-ye Yek, Dasht-e Azadegan =

Dahimi-ye Yek دحيمي يك
- Village
- Location within Iran
- Coordinates: 31°37′30″N 48°05′43″E
- Country: Iran
- Province: Khuzestan
- County: Dasht-e Azadegan
- Bakhsh: Central
- Rural District: Howmeh-ye Gharbi

Population (2006)
  - Total: 28
- Time zone: UTC+3:30 (IRST)
  - Summer (DST): UTC+4:30 (IRDT)

Dahimi-ye Yek (Persian: دحيمي يك, also Romanized as Daḩīmī-ye Yek; also known as Daḩīmī) is a village in Howmeh-ye Gharbi Rural District, in the Central District of Dasht-e Azadegan County, Khuzestan Province, Iran. At the 2006 census, its population was 28, in 4 families.
