= Malekiyeh-ye Sofla =

Malekiyeh-ye Sofla مالكيه سفلي
- Village
- Location within Iran
- Coordinates: 31°32′06″N 48°08′57″E
- Country: Iran
- Province: Khuzestan
- County: Dasht-e Azadegan
- Bakhsh: Central
- Rural District: Howmeh-ye Sharqi

Population (2006)
  - Total: 1,978
- Time zone: UTC+3:30 (IRST)
  - Summer (DST): UTC+4:30 (IRDT)

Malekiyeh-ye Sofla (Persian: مالكيه سفلي, also Romanized as Mālekīyeh-ye Soflá; also known as Mālekīyeh, and Mālekīyeh-ye Jonūbī) is a village in Howmeh-ye Sharqi Rural District, in the Central District of Dasht-e Azadegan County, Khuzestan Province, Iran. At the 2006 census, its population was 1,978, in 311 families.
