= Hufel-e Gharbi =

Hufel-e Gharbi هوفل غربي
- Village
- Location within Iran
- Coordinates: 31°35′21″N 48°11′02″E
- Country: Iran
- Province: Khuzestan
- County: Dasht-e Azadegan
- Bakhsh: Central
- Rural District: Allah-o Akbar

Population (2006)
  - Total: 1,081
- Time zone: UTC+3:30 (IRST)
  - Summer (DST): UTC+4:30 (IRDT)

Hufel-e Gharbi (Persian: هوفل غربي, also Romanized as Hūfel-e Gharbī; also known as Hoofol, Howfel, and Hūfel) is a village in Allah-o Akbar Rural District, in the Central District of Dasht-e Azadegan County, Khuzestan Province, Iran. At the 2006 census, its population was 1,081, in 156 families.
