= Seyyed Abbas =

Seyyed Abbas or Seyyedabbas (Persian: سيدعباس) may refer to:

- Seyyed Abbas, Kermanshah
- Seyyed Abbas, Khuzestan
- Seyyed Abbas, Lorestan
- Seyyed Abbas, West Azerbaijan
- Seyyed Abbas Rural District, in Khuzestan Province
