= Malekiyeh-ye Gharbi =

Malekiyeh-ye Gharbi مالكيه غربي
- Village
- Location within Iran
- Coordinates: 31°32′24″N 48°10′12″E
- Country: Iran
- Province: Khuzestan
- County: Dasht-e Azadegan
- Bakhsh: Central
- Rural District: Howmeh-ye Gharbi

Population (2006)
  - Total: 1,009
- Time zone: UTC+3:30 (IRST)
  - Summer (DST): UTC+4:30 (IRDT)

Malekiyeh-ye Gharbi (Persian: مالكيه غربي, also Romanized as Māleḵīyeh-ye Gharbī) is a village in Howmeh-ye Gharbi Rural District, in the Central District of Dasht-e Azadegan County, Khuzestan Province, Iran. At the 2006 census, its population was 1,009, in 191 families.
