= Bardiyeh =

Bardiyeh (Persian: برديه) may refer to:

- Bardiyeh-ye Yek
- Bardiyeh-ye Kuchek
