= Mihanabad =

Village in Khuzestan province, Iran

Mihanabad Persian: ميهن اباد
- Village
- Location within Iran
- Coordinates: 31°40′24″N 47°59′19″E
- Country: Iran
- Province: Khuzestan
- County: Dasht-e Azadegan
- District: Bostan
- Rural District: Bostan

Population (2016)
  - Total: 138
- Time zone: UTC+3:30 (IRST)

Mihanabad (Persian: ميهن اباد) (Note: Also romanized as Mīhanābād; also known as Mīhanābād-e Shomālī) is a village in, and the capital of, Bostan Rural District of Bostan District, Dasht-e Azadegan County, Khuzestan province, Iran.

== Demographics ==
=== Population ===
At the time of the 2006 National Census, the village's population was 78 in 10 households. The following census in 2011 counted 89 people in 15 households. The 2016 census measured the population of the village as 138 people in 33 households.
