= Seyyed Khalaf, Dasht-e Azadegan =

Seyyed Khalaf سيدخلف
- Village
- Location within Iran
- Coordinates: 31°38′09″N 48°06′13″E
- Country: Iran
- Province: Khuzestan
- County: Dasht-e Azadegan
- Bakhsh: Central
- Rural District: Allah-o Akbar

Population (2006)
  - Total: 139
- Time zone: UTC+3:30 (IRST)
  - Summer (DST): UTC+4:30 (IRDT)

Seyyed Khalaf (Persian: سيدخلف; also known as Hūfel-e Seyyed Khalaf) is a village in Allah-o Akbar Rural District, in the Central District of Dasht-e Azadegan County, Khuzestan Province, Iran. At the 2006 census, its population was 139, in 19 families.
