= Al Bustan =

Al Bustan (Arabic: البستان) may refer to:

- Al-Bustan (East Jerusalem), neighbourhood in the Silwan area of East Jerusalem
  - King's Garden (biblical place), associated by biblical archaeologists with the Al-Bustan neighbourhood in the Silwan area of East Jerusalem
- Al Bustan, Oman
- Al Bustan, Saudi Arabia
- Al-Bustan, Syria
- Al-Bustan, Tyre, in Southern Lebanon

== See also ==
- Bostan (disambiguation)
