= Hufel-e Sharqi =

Hufel-e Sharqi هوفل شرقي
- Village
- Location within Iran
- Coordinates: 31°34′37″N 48°11′39″E
- Country: Iran
- Province: Khuzestan
- County: Dasht-e Azadegan
- Bakhsh: Central
- Rural District: Allah-o Akbar

Population (2006)
  - Total: 115
- Time zone: UTC+3:30 (IRST)
  - Summer (DST): UTC+4:30 (IRDT)

Hufel-e Sharqi (Persian: هوفل شرقي, also Romanized as Hūfel-e Sharqī; also known as Beyt-e Seyyed Arḩāmeh, Hoofol, Howfel, and Hūfel) is a village in Allah-o Akbar Rural District, in the Central District of Dasht-e Azadegan County, Khuzestan Province, Iran. At the 2006 census, its population was 115, in 14 families.
