= Dahimi-ye Do, Dasht-e Azadegan =

Dahimi-ye Do دحيمي دو
- Village
- Country: Iran
- Province: Khuzestan
- County: Dasht-e Azadegan
- Bakhsh: Central
- Rural District: Howmeh-ye Gharbi

Population (2006)
  - Total: 129
- Time zone: UTC+3:30 (IRST)
  - Summer (DST): UTC+4:30 (IRDT)

Dahimi-ye Do (Persian: دحيمي دو, also Romanized as Daḥīmī-ye Do) is a village in Howmeh-ye Gharbi Rural District, in the Central District of Dasht-e Azadegan County, Khuzestan Province, Iran. At the 2006 census, its population was 129, in 21 families.
