= Am Dabs =

Village in Khuzestan province, Iran

Am Dabs Persian: ام دبس
- Village
- Location within Iran
- Coordinates: 31°46′34″N 48°08′47″E
- Country: Iran
- Province: Khuzestan
- County: Dasht-e Azadegan
- District: Bostan
- Rural District: Bostan

Population (2016)
  - Total: 890
- Time zone: UTC+3:30 (IRST)

Am Dabs (Persian: ام دبس) (Note: Also romanized as Ām Dabs) is a village in Bostan Rural District of Bostan District, Dasht-e Azadegan County, Khuzestan province, Iran.

== Demographics ==
=== Population ===
At the time of the 2006 National Census, the village's population was 631 in 80 households. The following census in 2011 counted 830 people in 165 households. The 2016 census measured the population of the village as 890 people in 204 households. It was the most populous village in its rural district.
