= Boston, Virginia =

Boston, Virginia may refer to:

- Boston, Accomack County, Virginia, a census-designated place
- Boston, Culpeper County, Virginia, an unincorporated community

== See also ==
- South Boston, Virginia, a town
- Boston (disambiguation)
