= Malekiyeh-ye Vosta =

Malekiyeh-ye Vosta مالكيه وسطي
- Village
- Location within Iran
- Coordinates: 31°32′33″N 48°09′37″E
- Country: Iran
- Province: Khuzestan
- County: Dasht-e Azadegan
- Bakhsh: Central
- Rural District: Howmeh-ye Sharqi

Population (2006)
  - Total: 567
- Time zone: UTC+3:30 (IRST)
  - Summer (DST): UTC+4:30 (IRDT)

Malekiyeh-ye Vosta (Persian: مالكيه وسطي, also Romanized as Mālekīyeh-ye Vosţà; also known as Mālekīyeh and Mālekīyeh-ye Gharbī) is a village in Howmeh-ye Sharqi Rural District, in the Central District of Dasht-e Azadegan County, Khuzestan Province, Iran. At the 2006 census, its population was 567, in 104 families.
