= Jalizi-ye Hanzaleh =

Village in Khuzestan province, Iran

Jalizi-ye Hanzaleh Persian: جليزي حنظله
- Village
- Location within Iran
- Coordinates: 31°32′11″N 48°20′59″E
- Country: Iran
- Province: Khuzestan
- County: Dasht-e Azadegan
- District: Central
- Rural District: Allah-o Akbar

Population (2016)
  - Total: 2,038
- Time zone: UTC+3:30 (IRST)

Jalizi-ye Hanzaleh (Persian: جليزي حنظله) (Note: Also romanized as Jalīzī-ye Ḩanẓaleh) is a village in, and the capital of, Allah-o Akbar Rural District of the Central District of Dasht-e Azadegan County, Khuzestan province, Iran.

== Demographics ==
=== Population ===
At the time of the 2006 National Census, the village's population was 1,814 in 315 households. The following census in 2011 counted 1,651 people in 361 households. The 2016 census measured the population of the village as 2,038 people in 471 households.
