= Jalaliyeh Shomali =

Jalaliyeh Shomali جلاليه شمالي
- Village
- Location within Iran
- Coordinates: 31°30′40″N 48°14′54″E
- Country: Iran
- Province: Khuzestan
- County: Dasht-e Azadegan
- Bakhsh: Central
- Rural District: Howmeh-ye Sharqi

Population (2006)
  - Total: 671
- Time zone: UTC+3:30 (IRST)
  - Summer (DST): UTC+4:30 (IRDT)

Jalaliyeh Shomali (Persian: جلاليه شمالي, also Romanized as Jalālīyeh Shomālī) is a village in Howmeh-ye Sharqi Rural District, in the Central District of Dasht-e Azadegan County, Khuzestan Province, Iran. At the 2006 census, its population was 671, in 119 families.
