= Sagowr-e Hanzaleh =

Sagowr-e Hanzaleh صگورحنظله
- Village
- Location within Iran
- Coordinates: 31°31′45″N 48°17′32″E
- Country: Iran
- Province: Khuzestan
- County: Dasht-e Azadegan
- Bakhsh: Central
- Rural District: Allah-o Akbar

Population (2006)
  - Total: 241
- Time zone: UTC+3:30 (IRST)
  - Summer (DST): UTC+4:30 (IRDT)

Sagowr-e Hanzaleh (Persian: صگورحنظله, also Romanized as Sagowr-e Ḩanz̧aleh and Şagowr-e Ḩanz̧aleh; also known as Sagowr-e Khanz̧aleh) is a village in Allah-o Akbar Rural District, in the Central District of Dasht-e Azadegan County, Khuzestan Province, Iran. At the 2006 census, its population was 241, in 32 families.
