= Bardiyeh-ye Kuchek =

Bardiyeh-ye Kuchek برديه كوچك
- Village
- Location within Iran
- Coordinates: 31°36′56″N 48°05′59″E
- Country: Iran
- Province: Khuzestan
- County: Dasht-e Azadegan
- Bakhsh: Central
- Rural District: Howmeh-ye Gharbi

Population (2006)
  - Total: 186
- Time zone: UTC+3:30 (IRST)
  - Summer (DST): UTC+4:30 (IRDT)

Bardiyeh-ye Kuchek (Persian: برديه كوچك, also Romanized as Bardīyeh-ye Kūchek; also known as Daḩīmāvīyeh and Dakhmāvīyeh) is a village in Howmeh-ye Gharbi Rural District, in the Central District of Dasht-e Azadegan County, Khuzestan Province, Iran. At the 2006 census, its population was 186, in 29 families.
