= Jalaliyeh Jonubi =

Jalaliyeh Jonubi جلاليه جنوبي
- Village
- Location within Iran
- Coordinates: 31°30′19″N 48°14′43″E
- Country: Iran
- Province: Khuzestan
- County: Dasht-e Azadegan
- Bakhsh: Central
- Rural District: Howmeh-ye Sharqi

Population (2006)
  - Total: 1,140
- Time zone: UTC+3:30 (IRST)
  - Summer (DST): UTC+4:30 (IRDT)

Jalaliyeh Jonubi (Persian: جلاليه جنوبي, also Romanized as Jalālīyeh Jonūbī; also known as Şadr-e Jalālīyeh) is a village in Howmeh-ye Sharqi Rural District, in the Central District of Dasht-e Azadegan County, Khuzestan Province, Iran. At the 2006 census, its population was 1,140, in 217 families.
