= Malekiyeh-ye Olya =

Malekiyeh-ye Olya مالكيه عليا
- Village
- Location within Iran
- Coordinates: 31°33′06″N 48°10′17″E
- Country: Iran
- Province: Khuzestan
- County: Dasht-e Azadegan
- Bakhsh: Central
- Rural District: Howmeh-ye Sharqi

Population (2006)
  - Total: 2,031
- Time zone: UTC+3:30 (IRST)
  - Summer (DST): UTC+4:30 (IRDT)

Malekiyeh-ye Olya (Persian: مالكيه عليا, also Romanized as Mālekīyeh-ye ‘Olyā; also known as Mālekīyeh and Mālekīyeh-ye ‘Olyā Mashrūţeh) is a village in Howmeh-ye Sharqi Rural District, in the Central District of Dasht-e Azadegan County, Khuzestan Province, Iran. At the 2006 census, its population was 2,031, in 359 families.
