= Boston Township, Arkansas =

Boston Township, Arkansas may refer to one of the following places in the US state of Arkansas:

- Boston Township, Franklin County, Arkansas
- Boston Township, Madison County, Arkansas
- Boston Township, Newton County, Arkansas
- Boston Township, Washington County, Arkansas

== See also ==
- List of townships in Arkansas
- Boston Township (disambiguation)
