= Sagowr =

Sagowr (Persian: صگور) may refer to:

- Sagowr-e Farrih Mohammad
- Sagowr-e Hanzaleh
