= Machriyeh, Dasht-e Azadegan =

Machriyeh مچريه
- Village
- Location within Iran
- Coordinates: 31°39′03″N 47°55′59″E
- Country: Iran
- Province: Khuzestan
- County: Dasht-e Azadegan
- Bakhsh: Bostan
- Rural District: Bostan

Population (2006)
  - Total: 87
- Time zone: UTC+3:30 (IRST)
  - Summer (DST): UTC+4:30 (IRDT)

Machriyeh (Persian: مچريه, also Romanized as Machrīyeh; also known as Makrīyeh, Mojrīyeh, Mokrīyeh, and Moshīrīeh) is a village in Bostan Rural District, Bostan District, Dasht-e Azadegan County, Khuzestan Province, Iran. At the 2006 census, its population was 87, in 14 families.
