= Hufel-e Seyyed Hamad =

Hufel-e Seyyed Hamad هوفل سيدحمد
- Village
- Location within Iran
- Coordinates: 31°36′18″N 48°09′34″E
- Country: Iran
- Province: Khuzestan
- County: Dasht-e Azadegan
- Bakhsh: Central
- Rural District: Allah-o Akbar

Population (2006)
  - Total: 141
- Time zone: UTC+3:30 (IRST)
  - Summer (DST): UTC+4:30 (IRDT)

Hufel-e Seyyed Hamad (Persian: هوفل سيدحمد, also Romanized as Hūfel-e Seyyed Ḩamad; also known as Seyyed Aḩmad and Seyyed Ḩamd) is a village in Allah-o Akbar Rural District, in the Central District of Dasht-e Azadegan County, Khuzestan Province, Iran. At the 2006 census, its population was 141, in 21 families.
