= Sariyeh =

Village in Khuzestan province, Iran

Sariyeh Persian: ساريه
- Village
- Location within Iran
- Coordinates: 31°30′46″N 48°07′30″E
- Country: Iran
- Province: Khuzestan
- County: Dasht-e Azadegan
- District: Central
- Rural District: Howmeh-ye Sharqi

Population (2016)
  - Total: 2,608
- Time zone: UTC+3:30 (IRST)

Sariyeh (Persian: ساريه) (Note: Also romanized as Sārīyeh) is a village in Howmeh-ye Sharqi Rural District of the Central District of Dasht-e Azadegan County, Khuzestan province, Iran.

== Demographics ==
=== Population ===
At the time of the 2006 National Census, the village's population was 2,483 in 453 households. The 2011 census counted 2,634 people in 608 households. The 2016 census recorded the village's population as 2,608 people in 625 households. It was the most populous village in its rural district.
