= Sagowr-e Farrih Mohammad =

Sagowr-e Farrih Mohammad صگورفريح محمد
- Village
- Location within Iran
- Coordinates: 31°30′09″N 48°24′51″E
- Country: Iran
- Province: Khuzestan
- County: Dasht-e Azadegan
- Bakhsh: Central
- Rural District: Allah-o Akbar

Population (2006)
  - Total: 283
- Time zone: UTC+3:30 (IRST)
  - Summer (DST): UTC+4:30 (IRDT)

Sagowr-e Farrih Mohammad (Persian: صگورفريح محمد, also Romanized as Sagowr-e Farrīḩ Moḩammad; also known as Sagowr-e Farayeḩ and Şagowr-e Farrīḩ) is a village in Allah-o Akbar Rural District, in the Central District of Dasht-e Azadegan County, Khuzestan Province, Iran. At the 2006 census, its population was 283, in 39 families.
