= Borjan =

Borjan (Macedonian and Serbian Cyrillic: Бopjaн) is a South Slavic given name and surname. It may refer to:

- Milan Borjan (born 1987), Canadian soccer player
- Borjan Canev (born 1973), Macedonian conductor

== See also ==
- Boštjan
- Bojan
