= Naginimora =

Naginimora Naginimora
- town
- Location in Nagaland, India
- Coordinates: 26°48′33″N 94°48′36″E
- Country: India
- State: Nagaland
- District: Mon

Languages
  - Official: English
- Time zone: UTC+5:30 (IST)
- Vehicle registration: NL
- Website: nagaland.gov.in

Naginimora is a town in Nagaland, India. It is situated 11 km away from Kongan village in Mon District. It shares border with Bihubar in Assam on the economical corridor.

The name of the town is derived from the words "Nagini Mara or NaginiMora", which mean "the death of a Naga woman"(Source: research manuscript of Konang, N.S.) . Formerly known as Lekan, Naginimora is a subdivision in Mon district under an Additional Deputy Commissioner. It is on the bank of Dikhu river. The town population is predominantly inhabited by the Konyaks. A small but noisy town as one could see about 300 trucks plying up and down the street every day carrying river stones and coals from Kongan soil.

The only coalfield in Nagaland was founded in 1907 by the East India Company and is at Borjan and Kongan soil near Naganimora. Naganimora is biggest trading center of Nagaland Coal. The local weekly market held on Saturdays witnesses a medley crowd of Assamese and Konyak Nagas.
