= Bostonian =

A Bostonian is a person from Boston, Massachusetts, United States, or of Boston, Lincolnshire, England.

Bostonian may also refer to:

- Bostonian (horse), an American racehorse
- The Bostonians, a novel by Henry James
- The Bostonians (film), a 1984 film by Merchant Ivory Productions
- Boston accent, the dialect of American English spoken by native residents of Boston, Massachusetts
- Bostonian, a dress shoe brand acquired by C. & J. Clark in 1979

== See also ==
- Boston (disambiguation)
