= Dahimi-ye Yek =

Dahimi-ye Yek (Persian: دهيمي يك) may refer to:

- Dahimi-ye Yek, Dasht-e Azadegan
- Dahimi-ye Yek, Shush
