= Suchart =

Suchart (Thai: สุชาติ, RTGS: Suchat; from Pali/Sanskrit su 'good' + jāti 'birth') is a masculine given name of Thai origin.

== List of people with the given name ==
- Suchart Chaivichit (born 1956), Thai chess player
- Suchart Chomklin (born 1974), Thai politician
- Suchart Chaovisith (1940–2009), Thai politician
- Suchart Jairsuraparp (born 1951), Thai former sprinter
- Suchart Mutugun (born 1934), Thai former footballer
- Suchart Pichi (born 1979), Thai diver
- Suchart Prommai, Thai major general
- Suchart Sawatsi (born 1945), Thai editor and writer
- Suchart Tancharoen (born 1958), Thai politician
- Suchart Thada-Thamrongvech (born 1952), Thai politician and professor

== See also ==
- Sachat, village in Kazakhstan
