= Bardiyeh-ye Yek =

Village in Khuzestan province, Iran

Bardiyeh-ye Yek Persian: برديه يك
- Village
- Location within Iran
- Coordinates: 31°36′01″N 48°07′13″E
- Country: Iran
- Province: Khuzestan
- County: Dasht-e Azadegan
- District: Central
- Rural District: Howmeh-ye Gharbi

Population (2016)
  - Total: 1,173
- Time zone: UTC+3:30 (IRST)

Bardiyeh-ye Yek (Persian: برديه يك) (Note: Also romanized as Bardīyeh-ye Yek; also known as Bardīyeh and Sardīyeh) is a village in, and the capital of, Howmeh-ye Gharbi Rural District of the Central District of Dasht-e Azadegan County, Khuzestan province, Iran.

== Demographics ==
=== Population ===
At the time of the 2006 National Census, the village's population was 1,479 in 236 households. The following census in 2011 counted 1,395 people in 282 households. The 2016 census measured the population of the village as 1,173 people in 279 households. It was the most populous village in its rural district.
