= Basatin =

Basatin (also Basateen or sometimes Bustan) may refer to the following:

== Iran ==
- Basatin, Mahshahr, a village in Khuzestan Province
- Besatin, a village in the Bushehr Province in Iran

== Lebanon ==
- Basateen, Lebanon, a village in the Mount Lebanon Governorate of Lebanon

== Syria ==
- Basatin, a village in the Tartus Governorate of Syria

== Tunisia ==
- El Bassatine, a district of the city of Kasserine

== See also ==
- Bostan (disambiguation)
- Bustan (disambiguation)
