= Ali Khodadadi =

Ali Khodadadi may refer to:

- Ali Khodadadi (weaver)
- Ali Khodadadi (footballer)
