= Kut-e Seyyed Naim =

City in Khuzestan province, Iran

Kut-e Seyyed Naim Persian: كوت سيدنعيم
- City
- Location within Iran
- Coordinates: 31°27′29″N 48°22′51″E
- Country: Iran
- Province: Khuzestan
- County: Dasht-e Azadegan
- District: Central

Population (2016)
  - Total: 4,541
- Time zone: UTC+3:30 (IRST)

Kut-e Seyyed Naim (Persian: كوت سيدنعيم) (Note: Also romanized as Kūt-e Seyyed Nā‘īm) is a city in the Central District of Dasht-e Azadegan County, Khuzestan province, Iran.

== Demographics ==
=== Population ===
At the time of the 2006 National Census, Kut-e Seyyed Naim's population was 4,734 in 897 households, when it was a village in Howmeh-ye Sharqi Rural District. The following census in 2011 counted 5,094 people in 1,051 households. The 2016 census measured the population as 4,541 people in 1,201 households, by which time the village had been elevated to the status of a city.
