= Bostanabad (disambiguation) =

Bostanabad (Persian: بستان آباد) is a city in East Azerbaijan Province, Iran.

Bostanabad may also refer to:

- Bostanabad, Kermanshah
- Bostanabad, Qom
- Bostanabad County, an administrative subdivision of East Azerbaijan Province, Iran

== See also ==
- Bostan (disambiguation)
