= Abu Homeyzeh =

City in Khuzestan province, Iran

Abu Homeyzeh Persian: ابوحميظه
- City
- Location within Iran
- Coordinates: 31°31′47″N 48°13′14″E
- Country: Iran
- Province: Khuzestan
- County: Dasht-e Azadegan
- District: Central

Population (2016)
  - Total: 5,506
- Time zone: UTC+3:30 (IRST)

Abu Homeyzeh (Persian: ابوحميظه) (Note: Also romanized as Abū Ḩamīzeh and Abū Ḩomeyẕeh; also known as Abu Humaidhah, Abu Humaizah and Şadr-e Abū Ḩomeyẕeh) is a city in the Central District of Dasht-e Azadegan County, Khuzestan province, Iran.

== Demographics ==
=== Population ===
At the time of the 2006 National Census, Abu Homeyzeh's population was 5,247 in 4,865 households, when it was a village in Howmeh-ye Sharqi Rural District. The following census in 2011 counted 5,501 people in 1,330 households. The 2016 census measured the population as 5,506 people in 1,375 households, by which time the village had been elevated to the status a city.
