= Ramim =

Ramim may refer to

- Manara, Israel
- Ramim-e Shomali, Iran
