= Ramim-e Shomali =

Village in Khuzestan province, Iran

Ramim-e Shomali Persian: رميم شمالي
- Village
- Location within Iran
- Coordinates: 31°43′07″N 47°58′00″E
- Country: Iran
- Province: Khuzestan
- County: Dasht-e Azadegan
- District: Bostan
- Rural District: Saidiyeh

Population (2016)
  - Total: 331
- Time zone: UTC+3:30 (IRST)

Ramim-e Shomali (Persian: رميم شمالي) (Note: Also romanized as Ramīm-e Shomālī; also known as Ramīm and Rammam) is a village in Saidiyeh Rural District of Bostan District, Dasht-e Azadegan County, Khuzestan province, Iran.

== Demographics ==
=== Population ===
At the time of the 2006 National Census, the village's population was 288 in 32 households. The following census in 2011 counted 326 people in 59 households. The 2016 census measured the population of the village as 331 people in 80 households. It was the most populous village in its rural district.
