= Seyyed Abbas, Khuzestan =

Village in Khuzestan province, Iran

Seyyed Abbas Persian: سيدعباس
- Village
- Location within Iran
- Coordinates: 31°29′08″N 48°25′28″E
- Country: Iran
- Province: Khuzestan
- County: Dasht-e Azadegan
- District: Central
- Rural District: Allah-o Akbar

Population (2016)
  - Total: 2,875
- Time zone: UTC+3:30 (IRST)

Seyyed Abbas (Persian: سيدعباس) (Note: Also romanized as Seyyed ‘Abbās; also known as Seyyed ‘Abbās-e Ţāleqānī) is a village in Allah-o Akbar Rural District of the Central District of Dasht-e Azadegan County, Khuzestan province, Iran.

== Demographics ==
=== Population ===
At the time of the 2006 National Census, the village's population was 2,659 in 525 households. The following census in 2011 counted 2,779 people in 672 households. The 2016 census measured the population of the village as 2,875 people in 719 households. It was the most populous village in its rural district.
