= Dahimi-ye Do =

Dahimi-ye Do (Persian: دهيمي دو) may refer to:

- Dahimi-ye Do, Dasht-e Azadegan
- Dahimi-ye Do, Karkheh
