= Bostan Rural District =

Bostan Rural District (Persian: دهستان بستان) may refer to:

- Bostan Rural District (Khuzestan Province)
- Bostan Rural District (Khaf County), Razavi Khorasan province
