= Boston Store =

Boston Store may refer to:

== Chains named Boston Store ==
- Boston Stores (California), also known as The Boston Store, with stores near Los Angeles, California, and in Arizona
- Boston Store (Wisconsin)

== Individual stores named Boston Store ==
- Boston Store (Chandler, Oklahoma)
- Boston Store (Erie, Pennsylvania)

== Stores originally known as The Boston Store ==
- J. L. Brandeis and Sons
- Edgar Department Stores, originally called "The Boston Store", Brockton, Massachusetts
- Fowler, Dick & Walker, Wilkes-Barre, PA and Binghamton, NY, which became part of Boscov's
- J. W. Robinson's, originally named "Boston Dry Goods Store", Los Angeles, California
- Sibley's
- Wilson's (department store)
