= Bosta =

Bosta may refer to:

- Bosta (film), a 2005 Lebanese film
- British Orthodontic Society Technicians Award
- Bosta, Hungary
- Bosta, Bangladesh
- Bostadh, Great Bernera, Outer Hebrides, Scotland
- Bostadh Iron Age settlement
