= New Boston =

New Boston is the name of several places in the United States of America:

- New Boston, Illinois
- New Boston, Harrison County, Indiana
- New Boston, Spencer County, Indiana
- New Boston, Iowa
- New Boston, Michigan
- New Boston, Missouri
- New Boston, New Hampshire, a New England town
  - New Boston (CDP), New Hampshire, the main village in the town
  - New Boston Space Force Station
- New Boston, Ohio
- New Boston, Pennsylvania
- New Boston, Texas

== See also ==
- Neu Boston, a village in the town of Storkow, Brandenburg, Germany
- Boston (disambiguation)
