= Bostin =

Bostin or Boštin can refer to:

- Bostin Christopher, an American actor
- Boštin, the Croatian name of the village of Bosta, Hungary
- Misspelling of Boston, the state capital of Massachusetts, United States
- Bostin, a slang word in some dialects of British English
