= Ellikqala District =

Coordinates: 41.843734°N 60.909233°E

- District
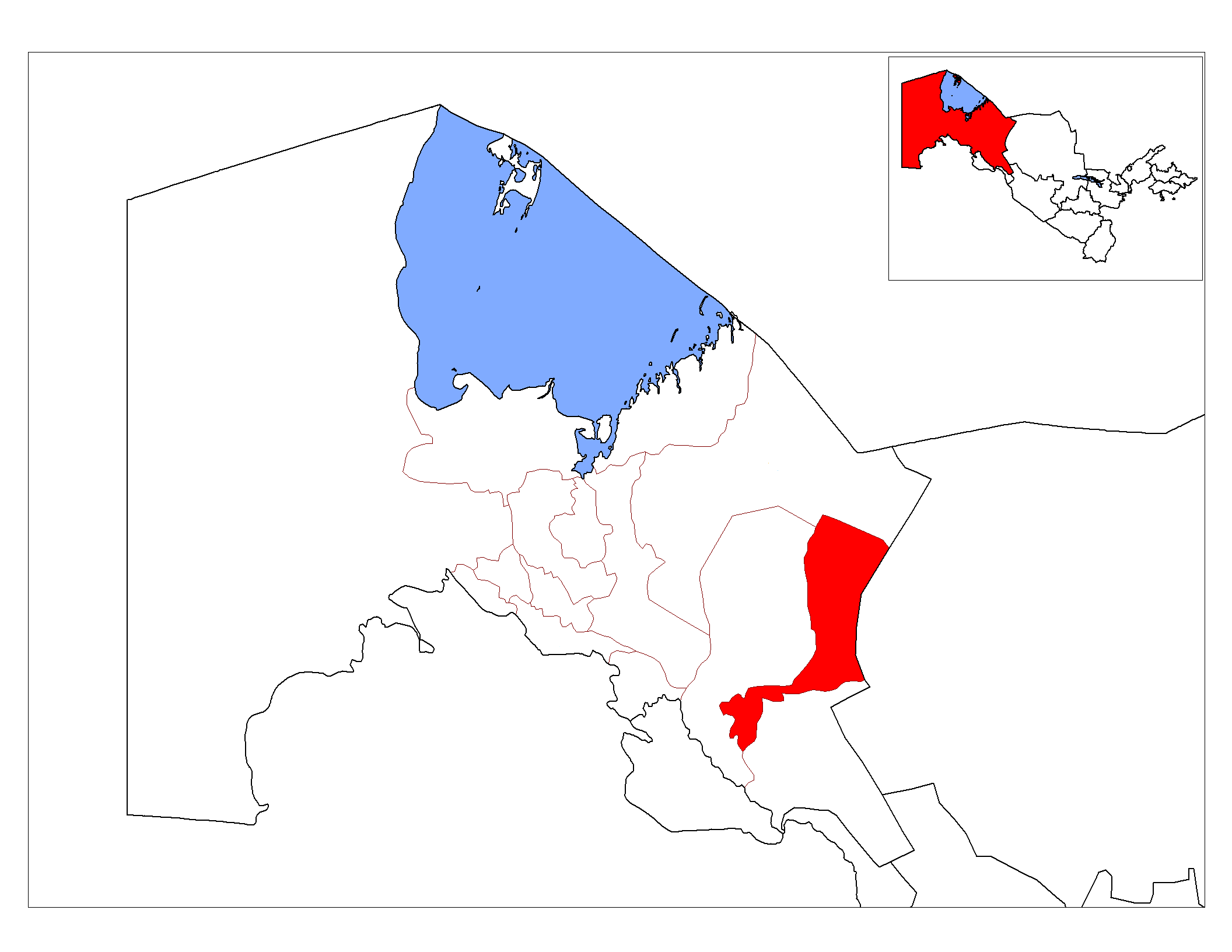
- Country: Uzbekistan
- Autonomous Republic: Karakalpakstan
- Capital: Boʻston

Area
  - Total: 5,420 km^{2} (2,090 sq mi)

Population (2022)
  - Total: 164,600
  - Density: 30.4/km^{2} (78.7/sq mi)
- Time zone: UTC+5 (UZT)

Ellikqala District (Uzbek: Ellikqalʼa tumani, Karakalpak: Ellikqala rayonı) is a district of Karakalpakstan in Uzbekistan. The capital lies at the city Boʻston. Its area is 5,420 km^{2} (2,090 sq mi) and it had 164,600 inhabitants in 2022.

There is one city (Boʻston), one town (Saxtiyon) and 13 rural communities (Amirobod, Guldursun, Guliston, Navoiy, Oqchakoʻl, Sarabiy, Tozabogʻ, Sharq Yulduzi, Ellikqalʼa, Qizilqum, Qilchinoq, Qirqqiz Fortress, Doʻstlik).

The district takes its name from the Elliq Qala (Karakalpak fifty fortresses), a series of ancient desert castles in the district.
