= Boston (given name) =

Boston is a masculine given name which may refer to:

- Boston Blackie (guitarist) (1943–1993), American guitarist, singer, and bandleader
- Boston Charley (c. 1854–1873), Native American warrior in the Modoc War
- Boston Corbett (1832–presumed dead 1894), American soldier who shot Abraham Lincoln's assassin John Wilkes Booth
- Boston Custer (1848–1876), brother of George Armstrong Custer
- Boston Jenkins Drayton (1821–1865), Liberian politician, judge, and Lutheran minister
- Boston Jersey (born 1736 or 1737), enslaved Royal Navy sailor
- Boston Mwanza (born 1977), Zambian footballer
- Boston Reid (born 1982), American racing driver
- Boston Scott (born 1995), American football player
- Boston Simbeye (born 1959), Malawian boxer
