= Boston Township =

Boston Township may refer to the following places in the United States:

- Boston Township, Madison County, Arkansas
- Boston Township, Washington County, Arkansas
- Boston Township, Wayne County, Indiana
- Boston Township, Michigan
- Boston Township, Summit County, Ohio
