= Boston, Louisville =

Neighborhood in Louisville, Kentucky

Coordinates: 38.2361°N 85.4313°W

Boston is a former neighborhood of Louisville, Kentucky, located along Shelbyville Road (US 60) near Long Run. It is now surrounded by subdivisions and the designation is no longer used.
