= Dahimi-ye Yek, Shush =

Dahimi-ye Yek دهيمي يك
- Village
- Location within Iran
- Coordinates: 31°50′15″N 48°28′44″E
- Country: Iran
- Province: Khuzestan
- County: Shush
- Bakhsh: Shavur
- Rural District: Ahudasht

Population (2006)
  - Total: 381
- Time zone: UTC+3:30 (IRST)
  - Summer (DST): UTC+4:30 (IRDT)

Dahimi-ye Yek (Persian: دهيمي يك, also romanized as Daḩīmī-ye Yek; also known as Dahīmeh-e Yek) is a village in Ahudasht Rural District, Shavur District, Shush County, Khuzestan Province, Iran. At the 2006 census, its population was 381, in 59 families.
