= Boštjan Burger =

Slovenian geographer & photographer (born 1966)

Boštjan Burger (born 1966) is a Slovenian informatician, geographer, a panoramic and VR panoramic photographer and a speleologist. He was founder of the Burger Landmarks website and had retired as computer programmer in the 1990s to become a geographic researcher on the hydrology of waterfalls. He used VR panoramas as a tool in the research of landscapes. He was greatly influenced by geographer Don Bain for documenting the landscape with VR panoramas and Hans Nyberg for his use of QuickTime VR fullscreen panoramas.

His first 360° pictures – so called: Cycloramas, were taken with BW negative film in 1982.

- In 1989 he has created a computer program with an algorithm for assembling different types of crosswords, Word squares from 6x6 to 10x10 and no blank filled crosswords – Word rectangles 6x6. His crosswords were published in renovated Slovenian enigmatic magazines (Kih, Ugankarski domenek, ...) in a period from 1989 to 1992.
- Virtual museum Ljubljana: Open-Air Museum — founded by Boštjan Burger in 1993 and online 1996. Ljubljana, the capital of Slovenia was presented as a huge museum where streets were the expositions of the architecture and building interiors were museum rooms. The method of the presentation were interactive maps and interactive historical relations between locations of Ljubljana documented with photos and later with Virtual Reality panoramas. In 1999 Ljubljana municipality co-founded a one-year development of the Burger's Virtual museum Ljubljana.
- In June 1996 Boštjan Burger became involved in the creation of 'Slovenia Land of Waterfalls', which was launched on the Internet after 15 years of researching the hydrology of the waterfalls of Slovenia. Over 300 separate waterfalls were recorded with complete data and visual information on each waterfall – the majority of which were presented and documented in VR. And so the project went on to create other VR intensive initiatives.
- In 1997 the Virtual Reality Panorama project: Landmarks was started to create a striking visual presentation using Virtual Reality Panoramas. The Virtual Tour was very effective in showcasing locations like caves, deep gorges and mountain peaks, as well as towns, museums, castles, and national parks and ethnology. More than 11,000 VR Panoramas have been created for the project so far.
- The CD-ROM 'Waterfalls of Triglav National Park' was published 1998, and covered the entire area of the National Park with permanent waterfalls. The multimedia guide consisted of descriptions of waterfalls, accesses, GPS location, maps, interactive photos, QTVR's and 61 min. of VHS quality movies of waterfalls on a single CD. Many of the CD's were donated to Slovenian schools and incorporated into the Geography curriculum.
- In 1998–1999 the first virtual tour like street view with virtual reality panoramas with 400 virtual reality panoramas as part of Virtual museum Ljubljana was realised in Ljubljana (Slovenia).
- The 'Virtual guide to Slovenian Museums' began in March 2000, and the funding has continued into 2004. Many Slovenian cultural locations are represented, which are in turn connected to a virtual guide of each museum. Currently 106 museum exhibitions are presented within this project.
- Year 2000: The project of the Krško Nuclear power plant steam generators replacement took place and Burger has realized the documentation and visualization of the interior of the Nuclear power plant including a cooling water pools system which removes heat from the reactor core. The visualization was used as a learning tool to display processes in the nuclear plant.
- In September 2000, the newly initiated 'Karst Project' began to organize and photograph the cave systems of Postojna Cave and Škocjan Caves (Slovenia), so that people worldwide could admire this beauty without intruding in droves on the delicate ecosystem.

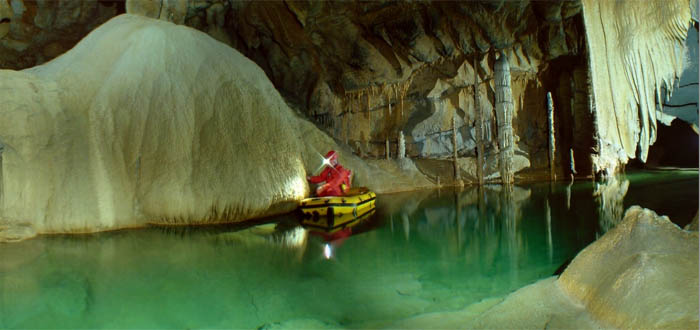
Burger's subterranean photography of Cross Cave, 2000

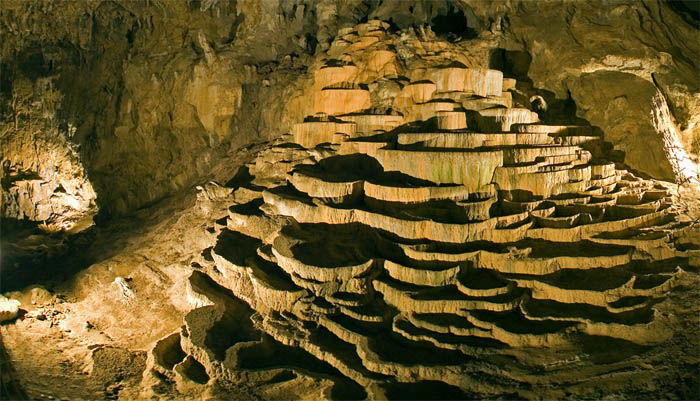
Burger's subterranean photography of Škocjan Caves, 2000

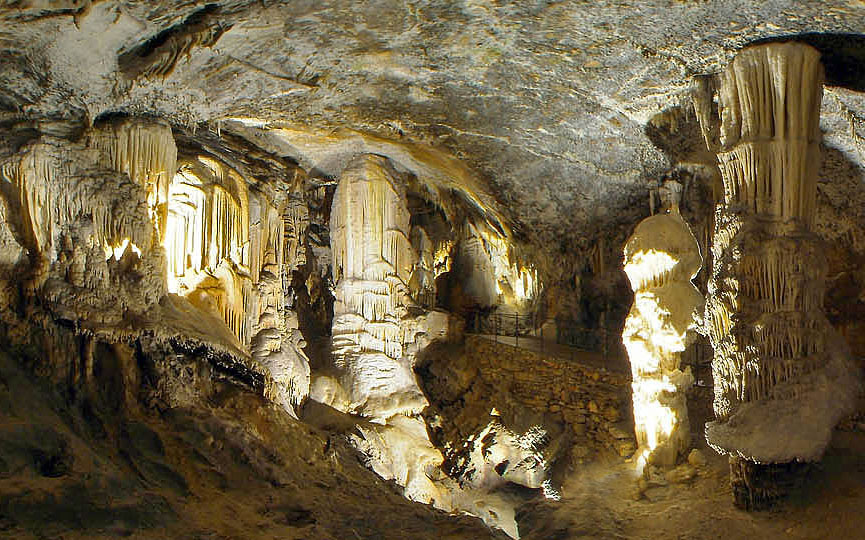
Burger's subterranean photography of Postojna Cave, 2000

- European schoolnet: 'Use of Internet and new technologies in schools'; from 4 to 11 May 2001 in Stockholm. Ministry of Education, Science and Sport of Slovenia has nomitnated Burger's photo virtual reality project "Images from Slovenia" to this European school projects. Teachers, educators, and researchers with extensive experience in educational technology have chosen their favourite examples and methods. Teachers and schools in all four corners of Europe made the most of their choice and the project was chosen as one of "favourites". (E-schola: E-schola ).
- July 2001: CD-ROM: the "Galop company" completed Project Leon Štukelj – Image of Slovenia. The goal of the project was to present Slovenian Olympic athlete Leon Štukelj and promote Slovenia. Data from Burger's project 'Images from Slovenia' was used for this project.
- Presentation of Slovenian museums and galleries in Barcelona, Spain: for that event Burger published Interactive virtual guide to selected museums of Slovenia on CD-rom. The images and Virtual Reality panoramas from the virtual guide were used as a background projection on that conference.
- Presentation of Republic Of Slovenia as a country of three regions in Bruxelless. (Ministry of Education, Science and Sport). For this event Burger has published a CD-rom presentation with VR panoramas of Slovenia which covered the background of the conference.
- Year 2002: Visualisation of touristic, economic and cultural centers in Slovenia. It was the cooperation with the Slovenian municipalities of: Lendava, Murska Sobota, Ptuj, Velenje, Škofja Loka, Koper, Bled and Kranjska Gora. Virtual guides to each centre was presented and published within the official URLs and CD media.
- Year 2003: Burger's cooperation with the Slovenian Tourist Board and visualisation of tourist destination points of the complete territory of Slovenia.
- Boštjan Burger presented at international educational conference MIRK in Piran, the use of the technology and computer at the educational process. Project of visualisation of cultural and geographical locations as an example of accessibility to disabled persons and as a showcase of the virtual exploration at the geography lessons.
- Three ICOM International Committees (CIMUSET, ICTOP and MPR). Burger with the cooperation of Association of Museums of Slovenia and Ministry of Culture of Slovenia published a CD-rom with Virtual Reality presentation which was also a background projection within the conferences.
- In a winter 2003/2004 virtual skiing of ski centres of Krvavec , Kranjska Gora, Vogel, Kanin and Ski centre Cerkno were realised.
- In 2004 the first commercial GIS application with the use of georeferenced Burgers Virtual Reality panoramas was used in the application Interactive Atlas of Slovenia made by Globalvision and published by Mladinska Knjiga. Same year the interactive VR panoramas were implemented into the java application for the mobile phones and used by the largest mobile company in Slovenia.
- Invitation and participation of Boštjan Burger's web project 'Slovenia Landmarks' at (FILE) ELECTRONIC LANGUAGE INTERNATIONAL FESTIVAL in São Paulo – Brazil. The invited works were result from a deep research that the organizers have done on the web and through this research; the organisers discovered the importance to have references showing during the festival. In that sense they had no doubt that project Slovenia Landmarks was a value contribution to the show as one of the reference of the media art evolution. The invited works were displayed in a special section in the website and in the exhibition.
- Boštjan Burger has used the method of documentation with Virtual Reality panoramas and worked with International Tourism Institute, Ljubljana at the cultural project GOTHICmed: A Virtual Museum of Mediterranean Gothic architecture – Culture 2000, Action 2, cultural heritage, call 2004. The goals of the project GOTHICmed, which emphasises the importance of the common knowledge and cultural heritage, are the inventory of Gothic architecture in the Mediterranean.
- Year 2005: Boštjan Burger documented and made an interactive visual presentation of over 200 monuments including the All Saints Garden (designed by architect Jože Plečnik) in Ljubljana's cemetery »Žale« which was a member of The Association of Significant Cemeteries in Europe (ASCE). , .
- Year 2006: Boštjan Burger cooperated with the project "Slovenia Your Cooperation Partner – SYCP.
- In 2007, after three years of the study and ground photographic work Boštjan Burger completed a comprehensive Virtual museum of Jože Plečnik, a Slovene architect who practised in Vienna, Belgrade, Prague and Ljubljana. The mission of the virtual museum was an e-learning tool for students of architecture worldwide.
- He has developed and fine-tuned a method of light-painting to illuminate large caverns. In November 2010 he started important subterranean project which was 500 meters below ground in the methane gas polluted environment of a coal mine at Velenje in Slovenia. Between November 2010 and March 2011 he documented important coal mining processes using virtual reality panoramas, and presented all the collected visual data in an e-learning "classroom".
- On the international panoramic photography festival and exhibitions being held in Palmela on June 1–5, 2011, Boštjan Burger featured in this exhibit and has been chosen for his special contributions to the field as the master of the contemporary panoramic photography.
- In July 2011, Boštjan Burger has been threatened by the Slovenian Information commissioner to blur the faces of all people shown in public areas on his personal, non-commercial website, or otherwise he would have to take down all 11,000 VR Panoramas on his website showing people or other identifying features (building numbers, license plates, etc.) that were taken in Slovenia, or face fine or imprisonment. The cause for the threat from Information commissioner was unclear as he was ordered to blur or delete images, no matter when taken, even before Slovenia became independent country. His case was a precedence in a contemporary photography.
