= Wilson's (department store) =

Wilson's was a full line department store in Greenfield, Massachusetts. It first opened in 1882, and closed in 2020.

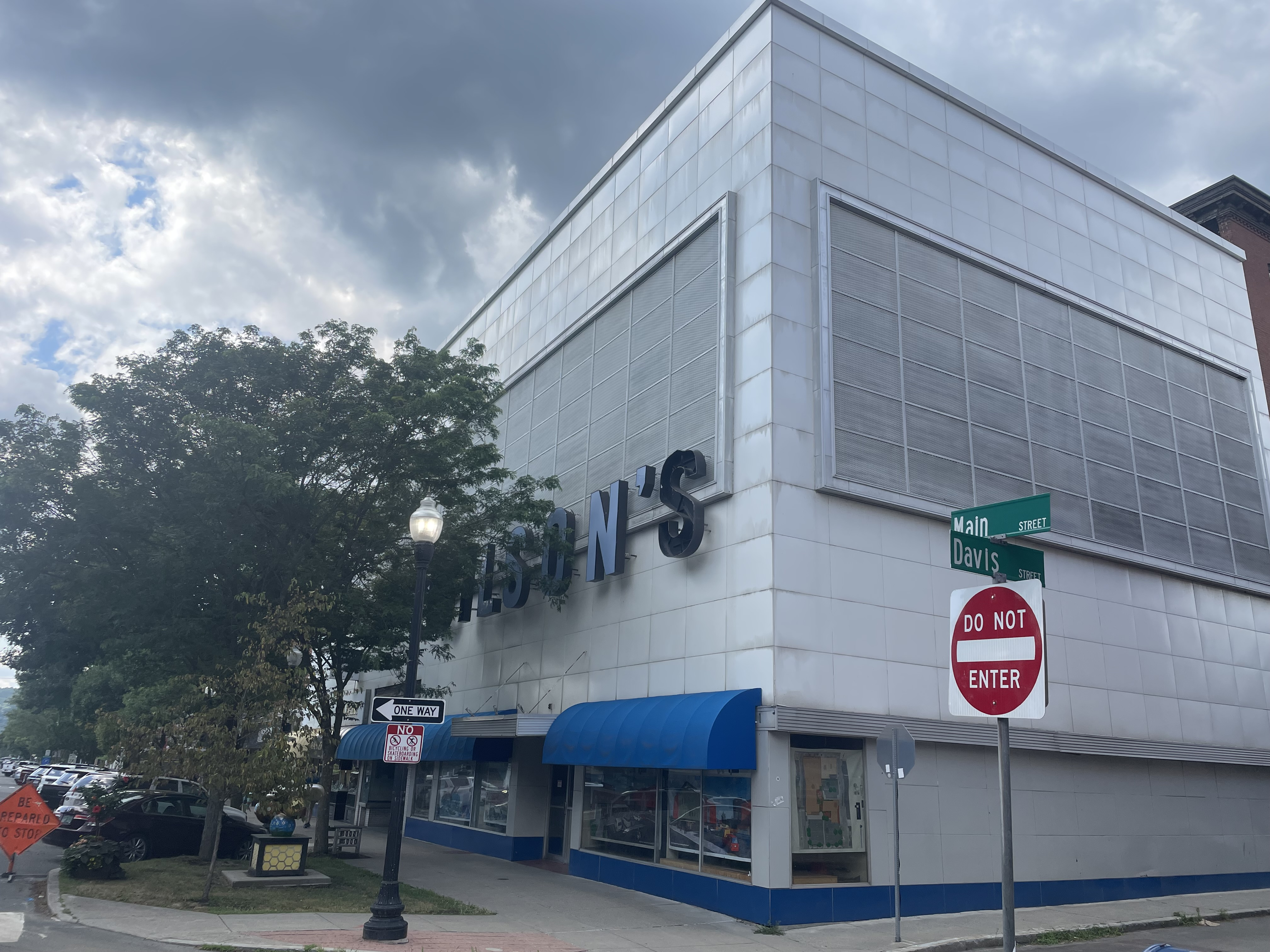
Former Wilson’s Building in Greenfield, Mass. August, 2025.

The original business, known as the Boston Store, was owned and operated by the White Brothers from 1882 to 1896. Its original frontage was only 25 feet, but it thrived and doubled in size. In 1896 John Wilson, from Scotland, bought the store from the Whites and renamed it the John Wilson Company. He enlarged the store by adding a second floor, a grand double staircase in the center, and a grocery department on the lower level. The new store even had a horse-drawn delivery service, with a livery stable on the premises.

In 1929, R. Stanley Reid of the former Boston Store in North Adams and George L. Willis of the then Wallace Company in Pittsfield together purchased the John Wilson Company store from the Wilson family. The Reid family owned the business after Mr. Willis's death in 1941. Robert S. Reid Jr. served as President of Wilson's from the time of his father's death in 1961 until his retirement in 1990. During his tenure he expanded the second floor and added a third floor into space once occupied by the Greenfield Hotel.

We are not what we were. We are not as busy as we used to be. I could keep it going for a few more years. I just didn’t want to.

— Kevin J. O’Neil

More expansion of the second and third floors took place in 1974. Kevin J. O’Neil, son-in-law of Mr. Reid, joined the family business in 1981. He was elected President of Wilson's, Inc. in 1990. He installed the first computer system and had overseen many interior remodeling projects, but elected to liquidate and close the store upon his retirement. Wilson's closed on January 31, 2020, by which time it was one of the few independent family–owned single–location traditional department stores (with an extensive complement of traditional departments, such as housewares, as well as clothing and cosmetics, sold at full prices) remaining in the United States.
