= Bostan, Sibi =

Bostan بوستان
- Location within Pakistan
- Coordinates: 29.30°N 67.52°E
- Country: Pakistan
- Province: Balochistan
- Elevation: 121 m (397 ft)
- Time zone: UTC+5 (PST)

Bostan (بوستان) is a town in the Balochistan province of Pakistan. It is located at 29°30'00N 67°52'0E with an altitude of 121 metres (400 feet).
