= Bostan Karim =

Guantanamo Bay detainee

Bostan Karim (also transliterated as Bostan Qaseem) is a citizen of Afghanistan, who was held in extrajudicial detention in the United States Guantanamo Bay detainment camps, in Cuba. Karim's Guantanamo detainee ID number was 975. Guantanamo counter-terrorism analysts estimate he was born in 1970, in Khost, Afghanistan.

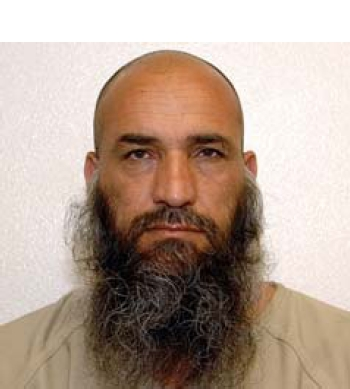
Bostan Karim

Karim was transferred to Oman on January 16, 2017.

== Official status reviews ==
Originally the Bush Presidency asserted that captives apprehended in the "war on terror" were not covered by the Geneva Conventions, and could be held indefinitely, without charge, and without an open and transparent review of the justifications for their detention. In 2004 the United States Supreme Court ruled, in Rasul v. Bush, that Guantanamo captives were entitled to being informed of the allegations justifying their detention, and were entitled to try to refute them.

=== Office for the Administrative Review of Detained Enemy Combatants ===
Combatant Status Review Tribunals were held in a 3x5 meter trailer where the captive sat with his hands and feet shackled to a bolt in the floor.

Following the Supreme Court's ruling, the Department of Defense set up the Office for the Administrative Review of Detained Enemy Combatants.

Scholars at the Brookings Institution, led by Benjamin Wittes, listed the captives still held at Guantanamo in December 2008, according to whether their detention was justified by certain common allegations:

- Bostan Karim was listed as one of the captives who "The military alleges ... took military or terrorist training in Afghanistan."
- Bostan Karim was listed as one of the captives who was a "Taliban fighters and operatives."

To comply with a Freedom of Information Act request, during the winter and spring of 2005, the Department of Defense released 507 memoranda. Each of the 507 memoranda contained the allegations against a single detainee, prepared for their Combatant Status Review Tribunals. The detainee's name and ID numbers were redacted from all but one of the memoranda. However, 169 of the memoranda had the detainee's ID hand-written on the top right hand of the first page corner. When the Department of Defense complied with a court order, and released official lists of the detainee's names and ID numbers it was possible to identify who those 169 were written about. Bostan Karim was one of those 169 detainees. The allegations against Karim presented to his Combatant Status Review Tribunal were:

a. The detainee is a member of the Taliban and al Qaida:
1. Detainee was possibly identified as an al Qaida associate, planning landmine attacks in Khowst [sic], Afghanistan.
2. Detainee was possibly identified as a person likely to have communicated with Arab al Qaida members operating in Peshawar, Afghanistan, and working directly for Arab al Qaida in the Knowst [sic] province.
3. The detainee recruited others to lay mines that would harm American and Afghan forces.
4. The detainee offered to pay others to lay mines that would harm American and Afghan forces.
5. The detainee was arrested by the Pakistani Police authorities on 13 August 2002 at the Khurgi, Pakistan checkpoint. In the detainee's possession was a Thuraya Satellite telephone, 2,700 United States Dollars, 3,600 Pakistan Rupees, and 70,000 Afghan Rupees.
6. A doctors examination of detainee’s hands indicated that extant scarring appeared to be caused by explosives.

=== Testimony ===
Karim chose to participate in his Combatant Status Review Tribunal.

=== Karim's witnesses ===
Karim began by asking why witnesses he had cited were disallowed. He was told that they were “Not reasonably available”. Other Tribunals have specifically asked detainees to explain what they think unavailable witnesses would testify to. Karim was not asked to explain what he thought his witnesses would testify to.

During his testimony, Karim repeatedly expressed his regret that his former business partner Obaidullah, and Abdullah Wazir were not present to testify on his behalf. Usually “Not reasonably available” meant that the witnesses were not in Guantanamo. But both Abaidullah and Abdullah Wazir were present in Guantanamo. Late, during the nine months it took to convene tribunals for the 558 detainees who remained at Guantanamo there was a policy change about allowing detainees to call other detainees as witnesses. Following the policy change, the Personal Representative would meet with the witness, and take a statement, if they were classified at a different level of compliance than the detainee who requested them. The detainee was only allowed to question their witness, live and in person, if they were classified at the same level of compliance as their witness.

=== Karim's testimony ===
Karim chose to have the allegations against him read out, one at a time, so he could respond to each one in turn. Karim denied being a member of the Taliban, or al-Qaeda. He denied knowing any Arabs. He denied having anything to do with landmines. He pointed out that he had to borrow money for the last buying excursion for his two stores.

Karim acknowledged that he was arrested at the border, when the minibus he was a passenger in was stopped. One of the other passengers was Abdullah Wazir, someone who had been a friend of his six years ago. When the van was stopped at the border, the border control agents asked three of the passengers to step out, including Wazir. When Wazir stepped out he unexpectedly handed Karim a package. Karim did not know what it was at first. He thought it might have been a camera. It was, in fact, Wazir's cell phone. Most of the money was Wazir's as well, except for 3,500 Rupees.

Karim said the burn scars on his hand and knee were from his childhood. His mother told him that when he was a toddler she had turned her back and he had tried to crawl on the cooking stove. He expressed skepticism that his pattern of burns, to two isolated parts of his body, could have been caused by an explosion.

Karim blamed the allegations against him on his former partner Abaidullah. He broke their partnership after a dispute over money. He felt Abaidullah owed him 80,000 Rupees. Abaidullah only acknowledged 60,000 Rupees. Karim suspected that Abaidullah may have drawn him into this trouble out of spite. Karim said that Abaidullah would not have known what caused the scars to his hand because he had never told him.

Karim acknowledged serving as a missionary. However, his missionary work was for a branch of Islam that preached peace and tolerance. They were suppressed by the Taliban because of their exposition of tolerance and unwillingness to engage in jihad.

== Administrative Review Board hearing ==
Detainees who were determined to have been properly classified as "enemy combatants" were scheduled to have their dossier reviewed at annual Administrative Review Board hearings. The Administrative Review Boards weren't authorized to review whether a detainee qualified for POW status, and they weren't authorized to review whether a detainee should have been classified as an "enemy combatant".

They were authorized to consider whether a detainee should continue to be detained by the United States, because they continued to pose a threat—or whether they could safely be repatriated to the custody of their home country, or whether they could be set free.

Karim chose to participate in his Administrative Review Board hearing.

=== Factors for and against Karim's continued detention ===
The factors for and against a detainee's continued detention are always broken down into related sections. Most detainee's transcripts retain the factor's classifications. But Karim's transcript did not.

- During the Russian/Afghan war, while he was a refugee in Miranshah, Pakistan, the detainee served with the Mujahideen based in Pakistan.
- The detainee is said to be an Afghan al Qaida member residing in Khowst and the planner for their attacks in the region.
- Prior to his arrest, the detainee traveled in Afghanistan and Pakistan to recruit for the Tablighi. On this trip the detainee claimed that he was the Amir of the Group of Tablighis.
- The detainee claimed that he is shopkeeper and a Tablighi.
- The detainee is said to have stored mines at his residence and to have had direct communication with Arab al Qaida members operating out of Peshawar.
- The detainee is believed to be a leader of an Afghan al Qaida cell in Khowst, Province, Afghanistan.
- A raid was conducted on the home of the detainee’s associate. The raid netted several active anti-tank mines and empty mine shells with explosives removed.
- An associate believes the detainee may have belonged to one of the warlord groups in Khowst.
- Another associate of the detainee described the detainee as a religious person, not a Taliban member but definitely a friend of the Taliban.
- The detainee is said to have told several people that he was preparing to conduct command-detonated mine attacks against U.S. Forces. Shortly after this threat, U.S. Forces discovered and destroyed in place two apparently command-detonated, probably plastic shelled, anti-tank mines that had been placed in holes on a highway in Afghanistan.
- The detainee is said to have asked an associate to store some land mines at his home.
- The detainee is said to have passed information to an associate on how to detonate mines.
- The detainee promised to pay an associate if he planted mines.
- The detainee was apprehended because he matched the description of an al Qaida bomb cell leader and had a Thuraya phone.
- The detainee’s palms were significantly scarred and the burn patterns were consistent with something burning or exploding while being held.
- As associate of the detainee said that he had no knowledge of the detainee being associated with the Taliban or al Qaida and he had no knowledge of the detainee being involved with explosives.
- A family member of the detainee claims the detainee has had scars on his hand since before the family member was born.
- The detainee claims an associate gave him the cell phone while going through a police checkpoint.
- One of the detainee’s accusers has recanted his story about the detainee giving him mines. The accuser now claims the detainee did not give him mines, but that the person who previously resided in the house left the mines at his residence. He also says the detainee did not pass him information on how to detonate mines.
- An accuser of the detainee has since recanted his statement about the detainee’s connection to anti-tank mines and now claims the detainee was not connected to setting anti-tank mines.
- The detainee adamantly denied ever giving his associate anti-tank mines.
- The detainee denied having any other associations to al Qaida or Taliban members or their whereabouts. The detainee stated that the al Qaida and Taliban are “lost”.
- An associate of the detainee said the detainee was not associated with al Qaida.

== Habeas corpus submission ==
Bostan Karim is one of the sixteen Guantanamo captives whose amalgamated habeas corpus submissions were heard by US District Court Judge Reggie B. Walton on January 31, 2007. Although a writ of habeas corpus had been submitted on his behalf, the DoD did not release the unclassified dossier from his Tribunal. The DoD has not offered an explanation why his dossier was not included with the dossiers of the other captives released in September 2007.
