= Mochriyeh, Shoushtar =

Mochriyeh مچريه
- Village
- Location within Iran
- Coordinates: 31°48′25″N 49°00′52″E
- Country: Iran
- Province: Khuzestan
- County: Shushtar
- Bakhsh: Central
- Rural District: Miyan Ab

Population (2006)
  - Total: 344
- Time zone: UTC+3:30 (IRST)
  - Summer (DST): UTC+4:30 (IRDT)

Mochriyeh (Persian: مچريه, also Romanized as Mochrīyeh; also known as Machria and Mojrīyeh) is a village in Miyan Ab Rural District, in the Central District of Shushtar County, Khuzestan Province, Iran. At the 2006 census, its population was 344, in 56 families.
