= Hufel, Mahshahr =

Hufel هوفل
- Village
- Location within Iran
- Coordinates: 30°44′22″N 49°01′18″E
- Country: Iran
- Province: Khuzestan
- County: Mahshahr
- Bakhsh: Central
- Rural District: Jarahi

Population (2006)
  - Total: 64
- Time zone: UTC+3:30 (IRST)
  - Summer (DST): UTC+4:30 (IRDT)

Hufel (Persian: هوفل, also Romanized as Hūfel and Hūfal; also known as Ahūfal) is a village in Jarahi Rural District, in the Central District of Mahshahr County, Khuzestan Province, Iran. At the 2006 census, its population was 64, in 11 families.
