= Seyyed Abbas, Kermanshah =

Seyyed Abbas سيدعباس
- Village
- Country: Iran
- Province: Kermanshah
- County: Kermanshah
- Bakhsh: Firuzabad
- Rural District: Osmanvand

Population (2006)
  - Total: 56
- Time zone: UTC+3:30 (IRST)
  - Summer (DST): UTC+4:30 (IRDT)

Seyyed Abbas (Persian: سيدعباس, also Romanized as Seyyed ʿAbbās) is a village in Osmanvand Rural District, Firuzabad District, Kermanshah County, Kermanshah Province, Iran. At the 2006 census, its population was 56, in 15 families.
