= USS Boston =

USS Boston may refer to:

- USS Boston (1776), was a gundalow launched in 1776 and burned to avoid capture by the British on 13 October 1776
- USS Boston (1777), was a 24-gun frigate, commissioned in 1777 and captured by the British in 1780
- USS Boston (1799), was a 28-gun frigate lost during the War of 1812
- USS Boston (1825), was an 18-gun sloop of war commissioned in 1826 and wrecked in the Bahamas in 1846
- USS Boston (1884), was a protected cruiser commissioned in 1887 and took part in the Spanish–American War
- USS Boston (CA-69), was a heavy cruiser commissioned 1943 and active in both World War II and the Korean War
- USS Boston (SSN-703), was a Los Angeles-class nuclear attack submarine decommissioned in 1999
