= Borjan Canev =

Macedonian conductor

Borjan Canev (born 1973 in Skopje) is a Macedonian conductor trained at the Royal College of Music in London. Back then, he served as Sir Colin Davis' assistant conductor at his 2001 production of Wolfgang Amadeus Mozart's Don Giovanni.

He is the principal conductor of the Makedonska Filharmonija (1999–present) and the Skopje Soloists Chamber Orchestra (2004–present), and the Sofia Philharmonic's principal guest conductor.

== Sources ==
- Makedonska Filharmonija
- Institute for Research and Archiving of Music, Skopje
