= Shahrak-e Bostan =

Shahrak-e Bostan شهرك بستان
- Village
- Country: Iran
- Province: Fars
- County: Darab
- Bakhsh: Forg
- Rural District: Abshur

Population (2006)
  - Total: 418
- Time zone: UTC+3:30 (IRST)
  - Summer (DST): UTC+4:30 (IRDT)

Shahrak-e Bostan (Persian: شهرك بستان, also Romanized as Shahrak-e Bostān) is a village in Abshur Rural District, Forg District, Darab County, Fars province, Iran. At the 2006 census, its population was 418, in 81 families.
