= Ostan =

Ostan may refer to:

- OS-tan, Internet personifications of operating systems
- Ostan (Geography), Iranian name for "province"
- Ostan or Óstán, Irish word for "hotel", which may be seen around Ireland
- Spring festival in Austria, 2 days after Easter
- Polish name for "Go with God"
- Ostan, Old High German word for "dawn"
- Östan, Swedish word meaning "East wind"
