= Bustan-e Kuchek =

Bustan-e Kuchek بوستان كوچك
- Village
- Location within Iran
- Coordinates: 30°19′03″N 51°12′17″E
- Country: Iran
- Province: Kohgiluyeh and Boyer-Ahmad
- County: Basht
- Bakhsh: Basht
- Rural District: Babuyi

Population (2006)
  - Total: 78
- Time zone: UTC+3:30 (IRST)
  - Summer (DST): UTC+4:30 (IRDT)

Bustan-e Kuchek (Persian: بوستان كوچك, also Romanized as Būstān-e Kūchek) is a village in Babuyi Rural District, Basht District, Basht County, Kohgiluyeh and Boyer-Ahmad Province, Iran. At the 2006 census, its population was 78, in 18 families.
