= Qaleh Kharabeh =

Qaleh Kharabeh (Persian: قلعه خرابه) may refer to:

- Qaleh Kharabeh, Fars
- Qaleh Kharabeh, Gorgan
- Qaleh Kharabeh, Semnan
