= Bostan, Iran =

City in Khuzestan province, Iran

Bostan Persian: بستان
- City
- Location within Iran
- Coordinates: 31°43′15″N 47°59′05″E
- Country: Iran
- Province: Khuzestan
- County: Dasht-e Azadegan
- District: Bostan

Population (2016)
  - Total: 8,476
- Time zone: UTC+3:30 (IRST)

Bostan (Persian: بستان) (Note: Also romanized as Bostān; also known as al-Basāţīn, al-Bisaitin, and Bustān) is a city in, and the capital of, Bostan District of Dasht-e Azadegan County, Khuzestan province, Iran. It is approximately 10 miles from the Iran-Iraq border and mainly known for its battles during the Iran–Iraq War, the Operation Tariq al-Qods.

== Demographics ==
=== Population ===
At the time of the 2006 National Census, the city's population was 7,314 in 1,257 households. The following census in 2011 counted 7,258 people in 1,582 households. The 2016 census measured the population of the city as 8,476 people in 2,101 households.

== Climate ==
Climate data for Bostan (1986-2005)
Month	Jan	Feb	Mar	Apr	May	Jun	Jul	Aug	Sep	Oct	Nov	Dec	Year
Daily mean °C (°F)	11.5 (52.7)	13.6 (56.5)	17.7 (63.9)	23.9 (75.0)	29.7 (85.5)	33.3 (91.9)	35.5 (95.9)	35.1 (95.2)	31.2 (88.2)	26.4 (79.5)	18.5 (65.3)	13.2 (55.8)	24.1 (75.5)
Average precipitation mm (inches)	45.1 (1.78)	28.0 (1.10)	35.4 (1.39)	19.1 (0.75)	1.5 (0.06)	0.0 (0.0)	0.0 (0.0)	0.1 (0.00)	0.1 (0.00)	4.4 (0.17)	29.0 (1.14)	44.1 (1.74)	206.8 (8.13)
Mean monthly sunshine hours	178.9	200.0	222.1	237.3	282.3	334.7	342.1	342.5	310.4	266.5	218.3	166.3	3,101.4
Source: Iran Meteorological Organization

== See also ==
- Iran-Iraq war
- Khorramshahr
- Susangerd
- Shadegan
- Hoveyzeh
