= Ali Khodadadi (weaver) =

Iranian carpet weaver and manufacturer

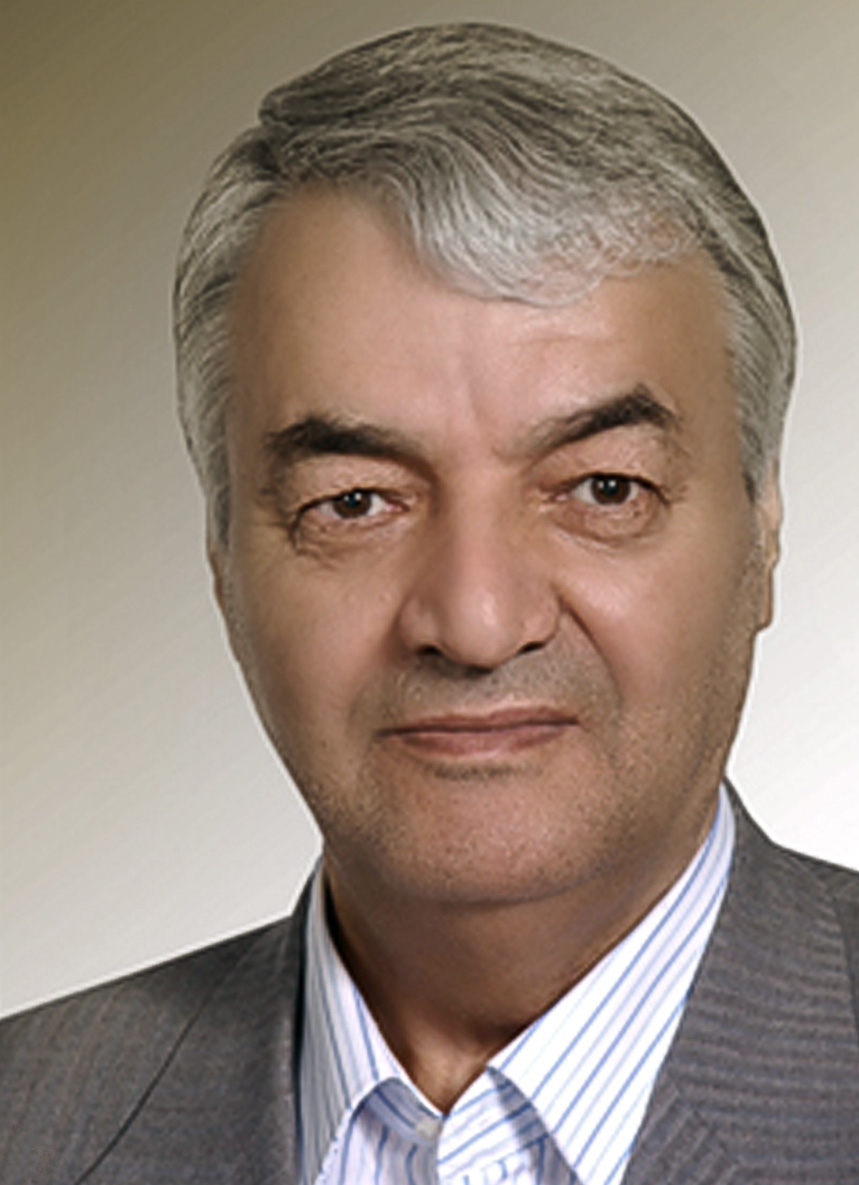
Ali Khodadadi

Ali Khodadadi (Persian: علی خدادادی, July 13, 1946 – June 9, 2011) was a carpet weaver and manufacturer from Iran, who was known for his work Boostan.

== Biography ==
Khodadadi was born in Shahreza, Iran in 1946. His father was a carpet manufacturer and tradesman, and his mother assisted her husband with his work. Khodadadi was very fond of painting and designing and, upon completion of high school, chose to pursue his artistic talent in the field of Persian rug weaving. In order to gain experience as an artist, he worked for two years as an apprentice under great masters, such as Master Zarrinkelk and Master Khaknegar.

His first work, "Flower and Butterfly," was completed in 1977 and put at the disposal of the Carpet Museum of Iran in 1984. This carpet was woven with an embossed design, but is considered very rare and unique due to the new weaving technique used by Khodadadi. "Flower and Butterfly" was woven with a longer pile (longer strands of wool), giving a three-dimensional effect to the animal, rose, and butterfly figures on the carpet.

During the final stage of weaving "Flower and Butterfly," Khodadadi had an idea for a new style of weaving inspired by inlaid art. He therefore took the measurements necessary to begin weaving his most famous work, "Boostan."
