= Basatin, Mahshahr =

Basatin بستين
- Village
- Location within Iran
- Coordinates: 30°50′25″N 49°13′45″E
- Country: Iran
- Province: Khuzestan
- County: Mahshahr
- Bakhsh: Central
- Rural District: Jarahi

Population (2006)
  - Total: 297
- Time zone: UTC+3:30 (IRST)
  - Summer (DST): UTC+4:30 (IRDT)

Basatin (Persian: بستين, also Romanized as Basātīn; also known as Basītīn, Beseytīn, Besītayn, and Busaithin) is a village in Jarahi Rural District, in the Central District of Mahshahr County, Khuzestan Province, Iran. At the 2006 census, its population was 297, in 51 families.
