= Boostan =

Persian carpet woven by Master Ali Khodadadi

Boostan (Persian: بوستان, lit. 'Garden'), formerly exhibited as Carpet to the Throne (Persian: با فرش تا عرش), is a Persian carpet woven by Master Ali Khodadadi and is considered to be a masterpiece in the history of Persian art.

== About Boostan ==
Master Khodadadi began the work of designing and weaving Boostan in March 1978. The design was described and dictated by Mr. Khodadadi and drawn by the late Master Archang Esfahani over the course of two months. Weaving began with a pile 7 centimeters thick (wool strands 7 centimeters long) and was completed in October 1979. The most important stage, and that which contributed the most to the artistic value of the carpet, the scissors work, was begun in November 1979 and completed in January 1986.

Boostan is referenced in The Dream of Paradise, a set of three books describing the most famous carpets in the world. In this reference collection, Boostan is listed among 115 internationally renowned pieces of art, including the Pazyryk carpet, considered to be the world's most antique carpet, woven in the 5th century B.C.

The following is a description of the design of Boostan, as cited in The Dream of Paradise:

Intermittent and sinuous scrolls of Band islimi motifs are elaborately employed to outline the [eight-point] medallion that glitters in the centre of the carpet. In this regard, khatayi motifs accompany the islimi scrolls in order to illuminate the central medallion whose pendants echo the decoration of the medallion. Having been illuminated in different hues and motifs, the wide and narrow borders stand out in contrast, in spite of the fact that they are drawn with no separating lines. In this respect, the wide border is embossed with almond-shaped medallions flanked by animal and khatayi motifs, whereas the narrow borders are embellished with intermittent and fluctuating floral islimis.

— The Dream of Paradise, vol. 1/3, p. 107

== Technical specifications ==
Name
Boostan ("Garden of Eternal Spring")
Design
Abbasi's Spandrel and Medallion
Dimensions
230 x 150 centimeters
Fibers
Merino wool, silk, linen
Knot used
Persian
Number of knots
3,800,000

== Boostan in the media ==
Master Khodadadi's carpet has been "recognized across the world as an [unrivaled] piece of art work." Boostan was presented to and enjoyed a four-day presence in the Islamic Consultative Assembly (Iranian Parliament), as well as having been exhibited in many different countries, including Japan, Germany, Qatar, Kuwait, and France. In addition, Boostan won first place at a carpet exhibition in Qatar in 1992, an exhibition in Hannover, Germany in 1992, and a carpet fair in Japan in 1998.

Boostan has been revered by many leading figures in Iran, including Ayatollah Khamenei (Supreme Leader), former President Khatami, and Dr. Hossein Elahi Ghomshei. It has been said that Master Khodadadi "linked the carpet to the heavens and rendered [from] the heavens the manifestation of beauty" and that Boostan is "a golden sheet in the history of Persian culture and art."
