= South Boston (disambiguation) =

South Boston is an area of Boston, Massachusetts.

South Boston may also refer to:

- South Boston, Indiana
- South Boston, Virginia
