= Boʻston =

District capital in Karakalpakstan, Uzbekistan

Boʻston: Bostan (Karakalpak); Бустан (Russian)
- City
- Location in Uzbekistan
- Coordinates: 41°51′N 60°56′E
- Country: Uzbekistan
- Autonomous republic: Karakalpakstan
- District: Ellikqala
- Elevation: 96 m (315 ft)

Population (2016)
  - Total: 14,400
- Time zone: UTC+5 (UZT)

Boʻston (from Uzbek), also known as Bostan (from Karakalpak) and Bustan (from Russian: Бустан), is the capital city of Ellikqala District in Karakalpakstan, Uzbekistan. Its population was 8,488 in 1989, and 14,400 in 2016.
