= Al-Bustan, Syria =

Al-Bustan البستان
- Village
- Location in Syria
- Coordinates: 35°0′20″N 36°19′52″E
- Country: Syria
- Governorate: Hama
- District: Masyaf
- Subdistrict: Masyaf

Population (2004)
  - Total: 2,175
- Time zone: UTC+3 (AST)
- City Qrya Pcode: C3359

Al-Bustan (Arabic: البستان) is a Syrian village located in the Masyaf Subdistrict in Masyaf District, located west of Hama. According to the Syria Central Bureau of Statistics (CBS), al-Bustan had a population of 2175 in the 2004 census.
