= Boston, Accomack County, Virginia =

Boston, Virginia
- Census-designated place
- Location in Accomack County and the state of Virginia.

- Location within Virginia Location within the United States
- Coordinates: 37°36′14″N 75°50′37″W
- Country: United States
- State: Virginia
- County: Accomack
- Elevation: 30 ft (9.1 m)

Population (2020)
  - Total: 454
- Time zone: UTC-5 (Eastern (EST))
  - Summer (DST): UTC-4 (EDT)
- GNIS feature ID: 2584810

Boston is a census-designated place (CDP) in Accomack County, Virginia, United States. Per the 2020 census, the population was 454.

== Geography ==
The CDP lies at an elevation of 30 feet.

== Demographics ==
Historical population
Census	Pop.	Note	%±
2010	504		—
2020	454		−9.9%
U.S. Decennial Census; 2010 2020

Boston first appeared as a census designated place in the 2010 U.S. census.

=== 2020 census ===
Boston CDP, Virginia – Racial and ethnic composition Note: the US Census treats Hispanic/Latino as an ethnic category. This table excludes Latinos from the racial categories and assigns them to a separate category. Hispanics/Latinos may be of any race.
Race / Ethnicity (NH = Non-Hispanic)	Pop 2010	Pop 2020	% 2010	% 2020
White alone (NH)	32	47	6.35%	10.35%
Black or African American alone (NH)	447	359	88.69%	79.07%
Native American or Alaska Native alone (NH)	0	0	0.00%	0.00%
Asian alone (NH)	0	1	0.00%	0.22%
Native Hawaiian or Pacific Islander alone (NH)	0	0	0.00%	0.00%
Other race alone (NH)	0	5	0.00%	1.10%
Mixed race or Multiracial (NH)	1	6	0.20%	1.32%
Hispanic or Latino (any race)	24	36	4.76%	7.93%
Total	504	454	100.00%	100.00%
