= Boston Township, Madison County, Arkansas =

Coordinates: 35.849404°N 93.576730°W

Boston Township
- Township
- Location in Arkansas
- Country: United States
- State: Arkansas
- County: Madison
- Established: 1872

Area
  - Total: 66.35 sq mi (171.8 km^{2})
  - Land: 66.27 sq mi (171.6 km^{2})
  - Water: 0.08 sq mi (0.21 km^{2})

Population (2010)
  - Total: 168
  - Density: 2.5/sq mi (0.97/km^{2})

Boston Township is one of 21 inactive townships in Madison County, Arkansas, USA. As of the 2010 census, its population was 168.
