= Bosta, Hungary =

Bosta
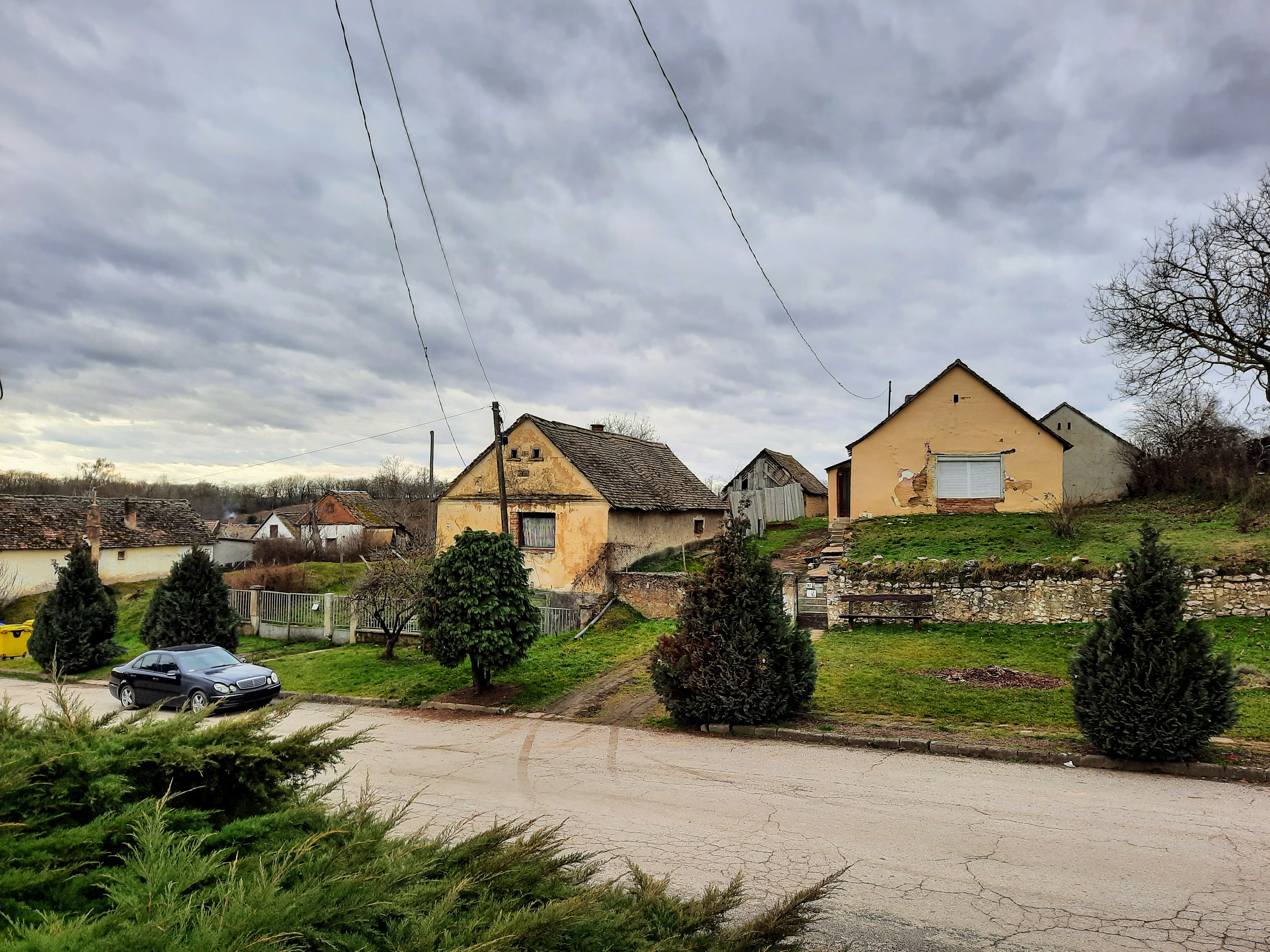

- Seal

- Location of Baranya county in Hungary

- Location of Bosta, Hungary
- Coordinates: 45.94934°N 18.21214°E
- Country: Hungary
- County: Baranya

Area
  - Total: 5.95 km^{2} (2.30 sq mi)

Population (2004)
  - Total: 147
  - Density: 24.7/km^{2} (64/sq mi)
- Time zone: UTC+1 (CET)
  - Summer (DST): UTC+2 (CEST)
- Postal code: 7811
- Area code: 72

Bosta (Croatian: Boštin) is a village in Baranya county, Hungary.
