= Saidiyeh Rural District =

Rural district in Khuzestan province, Iran

Saidiyeh Rural District Persian: دهستان سعيديه
- Rural District
- Location within Iran
- Coordinates: 31°51′38″N 47°53′52″E
- Country: Iran
- Province: Khuzestan
- County: Dasht-e Azadegan
- District: Bostan
- Capital: Hajji Salem

Population (2016)
  - Total: 506
- Time zone: UTC+3:30 (IRST)

Saidiyeh Rural District (Persian: دهستان سعيديه) is in Bostan District of Dasht-e Azadegan County, Khuzestan province, Iran. Its capital is the village of Hajji Salem (حاجی سالم).

== Demographics ==
=== Population ===
At the time of the 2006 National Census, the rural district's population was 423 in 51 households. There were 533 inhabitants in 81 households at the following census of 2011. The 2016 census measured the population of the rural district as 506 in 102 households. The most populous of its 39 villages was Ramim-e Shomali, with 331 people.
