= Bostan Rural District (Dasht-e Azadegan County) =

Rural district in Khuzestan province, Iran

Bostan Rural District Persian: دهستان بستان
- Rural District
- Location within Iran
- Coordinates: 31°43′50″N 48°02′27″E
- Country: Iran
- Province: Khuzestan
- County: Dasht-e Azadegan
- District: Bostan
- Capital: Mihanabad

Population (2016)
  - Total: 2,671
- Time zone: UTC+3:30 (IRST)

Bostan Rural District (Persian: دهستان بستان) is in Bostan District of Dasht-e Azadegan County, Khuzestan province, Iran. Its capital is the village of Mihanabad.

== Demographics ==
=== Population ===
At the time of the 2006 National Census, the rural district's population was 1,859 in 267 households. There were 2,240 inhabitants in 454 households at the following census of 2011. The 2016 census measured the population of the rural district as 2,671 in 664 households. The most populous of its 24 villages was Am Dabs, with 890 people.
