= Howmeh-ye Gharbi Rural District (Dasht-e Azadegan County) =

Rural district in Khuzestan province, Iran

Howmeh-ye Gharbi Rural District Persian: دهستان حومه غربي
- Rural District
- Location within Iran
- Coordinates: 31°35′09″N 48°06′15″E
- Country: Iran
- Province: Khuzestan
- County: Dasht-e Azadegan
- District: Central
- Capital: Bardiyeh-ye Yek

Population (2016)
  - Total: 5,202
- Time zone: UTC+3:30 (IRST)

Howmeh-ye Gharbi Rural District (Persian: دهستان حومه غربي) is in the Central District of Dasht-e Azadegan County, Khuzestan province, Iran. Its capital is the village of Bardiyeh-ye Yek.

== Demographics ==
=== Population ===
At the time of the 2006 National Census, the rural district's population was 6,917 in 1,104 households. There were 5,718 inhabitants in 1,324 households at the following census of 2011. The 2016 census measured the population of the rural district as 5,202 in 1,354 households. The most populous of its 21 villages was Bardiyeh-ye Yek, with 1,173 people.
