= Bostan District (Dasht-e Azadegan County) =

District in Khuzestan province, Iran

Bostan District Persian: بخش بستان
- District
- Location within Iran
- Coordinates: 31°50′05″N 47°56′31″E
- Country: Iran
- Province: Khuzestan
- County: Dasht-e Azadegan
- Capital: Bostan

Population (2016)
  - Total: 11,653
- Time zone: UTC+3:30 (IRST)

Bostan District (Persian: بخش بستان) is in Dasht-e Azadegan County, Khuzestan province, Iran. Its capital is the city of Bostan.

== Demographics ==
=== Population ===
At the time of the 2006 National Census, the district's population was 9,596 in 1,575 households. The following census in 2011 counted 10,031 people in 2,117 households. The 2016 census measured the population of the district as 11,653 inhabitants in 2,867 households.

=== Administrative divisions ===
Bostan District Population
Administrative Divisions	2006	2011	2016
Bostan RD	1,859	2,240	2,671
Saidiyeh RD	423	533	506
Bostan (city)	7,314	7,258	8,476
Total	9,596	10,031	11,653
RD = Rural District
