= Howmeh-ye Sharqi Rural District (Dasht-e Azadegan County) =

Rural district in Khuzestan province, Iran

Howmeh-ye Sharqi Rural District Persian: دهستان حومه شرقي
- Rural District
- Location within Iran
- Coordinates: 31°28′57″N 48°15′22″E
- Country: Iran
- Province: Khuzestan
- County: Dasht-e Azadegan
- District: Central

Population (2016)
  - Total: 13,949
- Time zone: UTC+3:30 (IRST)

Howmeh-ye Sharqi Rural District (Persian: دهستان حومه شرقي) is in the Central District of Dasht-e Azadegan County, Khuzestan province, Iran.

== Demographics ==
=== Population ===
At the time of the 2006 National Census, the rural district's population was 23,372 in 4,196 households. There were 25,602 inhabitants in 5,894 households at the following census of 2011. The 2016 census measured the population of the rural district as 13,949 in 3,355 households. The most populous of its 46 villages was Sariyeh, with 2,608 people.
