= Allah-o Akbar Rural District =

Rural district in Khuzestan province, Iran

Allah-o Akbar Rural District Persian: دهستان الله اكبر
- Rural District
- Location within Iran
- Coordinates: 31°37′04″N 48°15′51″E
- Country: Iran
- Province: Khuzestan
- County: Dasht-e Azadegan
- District: Central
- Capital: Jalizi-ye Hanzaleh

Population (2016)
  - Total: 15,707
- Time zone: UTC+3:30 (IRST)

Allah-o Akbar Rural District (Persian: دهستان الله اكبر) is in the Central District of Dasht-e Azadegan County, Khuzestan province, Iran. Its capital is the village of Jalizi-ye Hanzaleh.

== Demographics ==
=== Population ===
At the time of the 2006 National Census, the rural district's population was 12,639 in 2,093 households. There were 14,011 inhabitants in 3,107 households at the following census of 2011. The 2016 census measured the population of the rural district as 15,707 in 3,742 households. The most populous of its 26 villages was Seyyed Abbas, with 2,875 people.
