= Central District (Dasht-e Azadegan County) =

District in Khuzestan province, Iran

Central District (Dasht-e Azadegan County) Persian: بخش مرکزی شهرستان دشت آزادگان
- District
- Location within Iran
- Coordinates: 31°35′31″N 48°14′02″E
- Country: Iran
- Province: Khuzestan
- County: Dasht-e Azadegan
- Capital: Susangerd

Population (2016)
  - Total: 96,336
- Time zone: UTC+3:30 (IRST)

The Central District of Dasht-e Azadegan County (Persian: بخش مرکزی شهرستان دشت آزادگان) is in Khuzestan province, Iran. Its capital is the city of Susangerd.

== History ==
After the 2011 National Census, the villages of Abu Homeyzeh and Kut-e Seyyed Naim were elevated to city status.

== Demographics ==
=== Population ===
At the time of the 2006 census, the district's population was 86,519 in 15,029 households. The following census in 2011 counted 89,800 people in 20,225 households. The 2016 census measured the population of the district as 96,336 inhabitants in 23,691 households.

=== Administrative divisions ===
Central District (Dasht-e Azadegan County) Population
Administrative Divisions	2006	2011	2016
Allah-o Akbar RD	12,639	14,011	15,707
Howmeh-ye Gharbi RD	6,917	5,718	5,202
Howmeh-ye Sharqi RD	23,372	25,602	13,949
Abu Homeyzeh (city)			5,506
Kut-e Seyyed Naim (city)			4,541
Susangerd (city)	43,591	44,469	51,431
Total	86,519	89,800	96,336
RD = Rural District
