= Dasht-e Azadegan County =

County in Khuzestan province, Iran

Dasht-e Azadegan County Persian: شهرستان دشت آزادگان
- County
- Location of Dasht-e Azadegan County in Khuzestan province (center left, purple)

- Location of Khuzestan province in Iran
- Coordinates: 31°44′N 48°09′E
- Country: Iran
- Province: Khuzestan
- Capital: Susangerd
- Districts: Central, Bostan

Population (2016)
  - Total: 107,989
- Time zone: UTC+3:30 (IRST)

Dasht-e Azadegan County (Persian: شهرستان دشت آزادگان) (Note: Dasht-e Azadegan means "plain-free," "plain of free," or more precisely "plain of freedom") is in Khuzestan province, Iran. Its capital is the city of Susangerd.

== History ==
After the 2006 National Census, Hoveyzeh District was separated from the county in the establishment of Hoveyzeh County. After the 2011 census, the villages of Abu Homeyzeh and Kut-e Seyyed Naim were elevated to city status.

== Demographics ==
=== Population ===
At the time of the 2006 census, the county's population was 126,865 in 22,021 households. The following census in 2011 counted 99,831 people in 22,306 households. The 2016 census measured the population of the county as 107,989 in 26,558 households.

=== Administrative divisions ===
Dasht-e Azadegan County's population history and administrative structure over three consecutive censuses are shown in the following table.

Dasht-e Azadegan County Population
Administrative Divisions	2006	2011	2016
Central District	86,519	89,800	96,336
Allah-o Akbar RD	12,639	14,011	15,707
Howmeh-ye Gharbi RD	6,917	5,718	5,202
Howmeh-ye Sharqi RD	23,372	25,602	13,949
Abu Homeyzeh (city)			5,506
Kut-e Seyyed Naim (city)			4,541
Susangerd (city)	43,591	44,469	51,431
Bostan District	9,596	10,031	11,653
Bostan RD	1,859	2,240	2,671
Saidiyeh RD	423	533	506
Bostan (city)	7,314	7,258	8,476
Hoveyzeh District (Note: Transferred to Hoveyzeh County)	30,750		
Bani Saleh RD	2,718		
Hoveyzeh RD (Note: Renamed Hoveyzeh-ye Jonubi Rural District)	8,101		
Neysan RD	1,699		
Hoveyzeh (city)	14,422		
Rafi (city)	3,810		
Total	126,865	99,831	107,989
RD = Rural District

== See also ==
Media related to Dasht-e Azadegan County at Wikimedia Commons
