= Meleh Kabud =

Meleh Kabud or Melah Kabud (Persian: مله كبود) may refer to:

- Meleh Kabud, Dalahu, Kermanshah Province
- Melah Kabud, Salas-e Babajani, Kermanshah Province
- Meleh Kabud, Sarpol-e Zahab, Kermanshah Province
- Meleh Kabud-e Olya, Lorestan Province
- Meleh Kabud-e Sofla, Lorestan Province
