= Cham Zereshk (disambiguation) =

Cham Zereshk is a village in Lorestan Province, Iran.

Cham Zereshk (Persian: چم زرشك) may also refer to:

- Cham Zereshk-e Choqavian Gol Morad
- Cham Zereshk-e Esperi
- Cham Zereshk-e Olya
- Cham Zereshk-e Sofla
