= Seh Tapan =

Seh Tapan or Sehtapan (Persian: سه تپان) may refer to:

- Seh Tapan, Kermanshah
- Seh Tapan Aziz, Kermanshah Province
- Seh Tapan Salim, Kermanshah Province
- Sehtapan, Kurdistan
