= Tappeh Kabud =

Tappeh Kabud (Persian: تپه كبود) may refer to:

- Tappeh Kabud, Salas-e Babajani
- Tappeh Kabud, Ozgoleh, Salas-e Babajani County
- Tappeh Kabud-e Hasan Gholami, Salas-e Babajani County
- Tappeh Kabud-e Sofla, Salas-e Babajani County
- Tappeh Kabud-e Sofla Abdol Mohammad, Salas-e Babajani County
