= Khomgaran =

Village in Kermanshah province, Iran

Khomgaran Persian: خمگران
- Village
- Location within Iran
- Coordinates: 34°45′00″N 46°14′55″E
- Country: Iran
- Province: Kermanshah
- County: Salas-e Babajani
- District: Zamkan
- Rural District: Zamkan-e Shomali

Population (2016)
  - Total: 108
- Time zone: UTC+3:30 (IRST)

Khomgaran (Persian: خمگران) (Note: Also romanized as Khomgarān) is a village in, and the capital of, Zamkan-e Shomali Rural District of Zamkan District, Salas-e Babajani County, Kermanshah province, Iran.

== Demographics ==
=== Population ===
At the time of the 2006 National Census, the village's population was 102 in 25 households, when it was in Zamkan Rural District (Note: Renamed Zamkan-e Jonubi Rural District) of the Central District. The following census in 2011 counted 106 people in 25 households. The 2016 census measured the population of the village as 108 people in 29 households.

In 2019, the rural district was separated from the district in the formation of Zamkan District and renamed Zamkan-e Jonubi Rural District, and Khomgaran was transferred to Zamkan-e Shomali Rural District created in the new district.
