= Zamkan =

Zamkan or Zemkan (Persian: زمكان) may refer to:

- Zamkan-e Olya
- Zamkan District
- Zamkan Rural District, renamed Zamkan-e Jonubi Rural District
- Zamkan-e Jonubi Rural District
- Zamkan-e Shomali Rural District
