= Veylehi-ye Melah Rash =

Veylehi-ye Melah Rash ويله اي مله رش
- Village
- Location within Iran
- Coordinates: 34°52′00″N 46°08′00″E
- Country: Iran
- Province: Kermanshah
- County: Salas-e Babajani
- Bakhsh: Central
- Rural District: Zamkan

Population (2006)
  - Total: 32
- Time zone: UTC+3:30 (IRST)
  - Summer (DST): UTC+4:30 (IRDT)

Veylehi-ye Melah Rash (Persian: ويله اي مله رش, also Romanized as Veylehī-ye Melah Rash; also known as Veyleh-ye Melah Rash) is a village in Zamkan Rural District in the Central District of Salas-e Babajani County, Kermanshah Province, Iran. According to the 2006 census, its population was 32 people from 8 families.
