= Alvinehkar =

Alvinehkar آلوينه كر
- Village
- Location within Iran
- Coordinates: 34°52′00″N 46°09′00″E
- Country: Iran
- Province: Kermanshah
- County: Salas-e Babajani
- Bakhsh: Central
- Rural District: Zamkan

Population (2006)
  - Total: 90
- Time zone: UTC+3:30 (IRST)
  - Summer (DST): UTC+4:30 (IRDT)

Alvinehkar (Persian: آلوينه كر, also Romanized as Alvīnehkar; also known as Alvīnehgar) is a village in Zamkan Rural District, in the Central District of Salas-e Babajani County, Kermanshah Province, Iran. At the 2006 census, its population was 90, in 16 families.
