= Bani Nar =

Bani Nar باني نار
- Village
- Location within Iran
- Coordinates: 35°00′44″N 45°55′41″E
- Country: Iran
- Province: Kermanshah
- County: Salas-e Babajani
- Bakhsh: Central
- Rural District: Khaneh Shur

Population (2006)
  - Total: 208
- Time zone: UTC+3:30 (IRST)
  - Summer (DST): UTC+4:30 (IRDT)

Bani Nar (Persian: باني نار, also Romanized as Bānī Nār) is a village in Khaneh Shur Rural District, in the Central District of Salas-e Babajani County, Kermanshah Province, Iran. At the 2006 census, its population was 208, in 50 families.
