= Kisaleh, Salas-e Babajani =

Kisaleh كيسله
- Village
- Location within Iran
- Coordinates: 34°49′57″N 46°03′44″E
- Country: Iran
- Province: Kermanshah
- County: Salas-e Babajani
- Bakhsh: Central
- Rural District: Khaneh Shur

Population (2006)
  - Total: 221
- Time zone: UTC+3:30 (IRST)
  - Summer (DST): UTC+4:30 (IRDT)

Kisaleh (Persian: كيسله, also Romanized as Kīsaleh) is a village in Khaneh Shur Rural District, in the Central District of Salas-e Babajani County, Kermanshah Province, Iran. At the 2006 census, its population was 221, in 49 families.
