= Qalicheh =

Qalicheh قاليچه
- Village
- Location within Iran
- Coordinates: 34°55′21″N 45°59′01″E
- Country: Iran
- Province: Kermanshah
- County: Salas-e Babajani
- Bakhsh: Central
- Rural District: Khaneh Shur

Population (2006)
  - Total: 568
- Time zone: UTC+3:30 (IRST)
  - Summer (DST): UTC+4:30 (IRDT)

Qalicheh (Persian: قاليچه, also Romanized as Qālīcheh; also known as Qal‘eh Chegeh and Qal‘eh-ye Chegeh) is a village in Khaneh Shur Rural District, in the Central District of Salas-e Babajani County, Kermanshah Province, Iran. At the 2006 census, its population was 568, in 108 families.
