= Kolah Siah =

Kolah Siah كلاه سياه
- Village
- Location within Iran
- Coordinates: 34°53′28″N 46°01′44″E
- Country: Iran
- Province: Kermanshah
- County: Salas-e Babajani
- Bakhsh: Central
- Rural District: Khaneh Shur

Population (2006)
  - Total: 149
- Time zone: UTC+3:30 (IRST)
  - Summer (DST): UTC+4:30 (IRDT)

Kolah Siah (Persian: كلاه سياه, also Romanized as Kolāh Sīāh; also known as Kalāf Sīāh) is a village in Khaneh Shur Rural District, in the Central District of Salas-e Babajani County, Kermanshah Province, Iran. At the 2006 census, its population was 149, in 28 families.
