= Haleh Siah =

Haleh Siah هاله سياه
- Village
- Location within Iran
- Coordinates: 34°51′35″N 46°07′14″E
- Country: Iran
- Province: Kermanshah
- County: Salas-e Babajani
- Bakhsh: Central
- Rural District: Dasht-e Hor

Population (2006)
  - Total: 33
- Time zone: UTC+3:30 (IRST)
  - Summer (DST): UTC+4:30 (IRDT)

Haleh Siah (Persian: هاله سياه, also Romanized as Hāleh Sīāh; also known as Nīs Kajreh, and Nīskeh Jāreh) is a village in Dasht-e Hor Rural District, in the Central District of Salas-e Babajani County, Kermanshah Province, Iran. At the 2006 census, its population was 33, in 7 families.
