= Howz-e Sheykh-e Zemkan =

Howz-e Sheykh-e Zemkan حوض شيخ زمكان
- Village
- Location within Iran
- Coordinates: 34°39′31″N 46°16′51″E
- Country: Iran
- Province: Kermanshah
- County: Salas-e Babajani
- Bakhsh: Central
- Rural District: Zamkan

Population (2006)
  - Total: 100
- Time zone: UTC+3:30 (IRST)
  - Summer (DST): UTC+4:30 (IRDT)

Howz-e Sheykh-e Zemkan (Persian: حوض شيخ زمكان, also Romanized as Ḩowẕ-e Sheykh-e Zemkān; also known as Ḩowẕ-e Sheykh) is a village in Zamkan Rural District, in the Central District of Salas-e Babajani County, Kermanshah Province, Iran. At the 2006 census, its population was 100, in 18 families.
