= Kani Danial =

Kani Danial كاني دانيال
- Village
- Location within Iran
- Coordinates: 34°42′46″N 46°08′47″E
- Country: Iran
- Province: Kermanshah
- County: Salas-e Babajani
- Bakhsh: Central
- Rural District: Dasht-e Hor

Population (2006)
  - Total: 177
- Time zone: UTC+3:30 (IRST)
  - Summer (DST): UTC+4:30 (IRDT)

Kani Danial (Persian: كاني دانيال, also Romanized as Kānī Dānīāl; also known as Kānī Dānīār) is a village in Dasht-e Hor Rural District, in the Central District of Salas-e Babajani County, Kermanshah Province, Iran. At the 2006 census, its population was 177, with 31 families.
