= Qoman Khoda Nazer =

Qoman Khoda Nazer قمان خدا نظر
- Village
- Country: Iran
- Province: Kermanshah
- County: Salas-e Babajani
- Bakhsh: Central
- Rural District: Dasht-e Hor

Population (2006)
  - Total: 43
- Time zone: UTC+3:30 (IRST)
  - Summer (DST): UTC+4:30 (IRDT)

Qoman Khoda Nazer (Persian: قمان خدا نظر, also Romanized as Qomān Khodā Naẓer) is a village in Dasht-e Hor Rural District, in the Central District of Salas-e Babajani County, Kermanshah Province, Iran. At the 2006 census, its population was 43, in 8 families.
