= Qareh Zhaleh Mahar Ali =

Qareh Zhaleh Mahar Ali قره‌ژاله مهرعلی
- Village
- Interactive map of Qareh Zhaleh Mahar Ali
- Coordinates: 34°45′05″N 45°55′11″E
- Country: Iran
- Province: Kermanshah
- County: Salas-e Babajani
- Bakhsh: Ozgoleh
- Rural District: Ozgoleh

Population (2006)
  - Total: 51
- Time zone: UTC+3:30 (IRST)
  - Summer (DST): UTC+4:30 (IRDT)

Qareh Zhaleh Mahar Ali (Persian: قره‌ژاله مهرعلی, also Romanized as Qareh Zhāleh Mahar ʿAlī) is a village in Ozgoleh Rural District, Ozgoleh District, Salas-e Babajani County, Kermanshah Province, Iran. At the 2006 census, its population was 51, in 8 families.
