= Ghazan Dul Ali Morad =

Ghazan Dul Ali Morad غازان دول عليمراد
- Village
- Country: Iran
- Province: Kermanshah
- County: Salas-e Babajani
- Bakhsh: Ozgoleh
- Rural District: Ozgoleh

Population (2006)
  - Total: 25
- Time zone: UTC+3:30 (IRST)
  - Summer (DST): UTC+4:30 (IRDT)

Ghazan Dul Ali Morad (Persian: غازان دول عليمراد, also Romanized as Ghāzān Dūl ʿAlī Morād) is a village in Ozgoleh Rural District, Ozgoleh District, Salas-e Babajani County, Kermanshah Province, Iran. At the 2006 census, its population was 25, in 6 families.
