= Posht Gur-e Choqa Maran =

Posht Gur-e Choqa Maran پشتگور چقاماران
- Village
- Location within Iran
- Coordinates: 34°47′09″N 45°59′30″E
- Country: Iran
- Province: Kermanshah
- County: Salas-e Babajani
- Bakhsh: Central
- Rural District: Khaneh Shur

Population (2006)
  - Total: 286
- Time zone: UTC+3:30 (IRST)
  - Summer (DST): UTC+4:30 (IRDT)

Posht Gur-e Choqa Maran (Persian: پشتگور چقاماران, also Romanized as Posht Gūr-e Choqā Mārān; also known as Posht Kar) is a village in Khaneh Shur Rural District, in the Central District of Salas-e Babajani County, Kermanshah Province, Iran. At the 2006 census, its population was 286, in 60 families.
