= Choqa Maran =

Choqa Maran (Persian: چقاماران) may refer to:

- Choqa Maran (34°29′ N 47°00′ E), Kermanshah
- Choqa Maran (34°39′ N 46°52′ E), Kermanshah
- Choqamaran-e Bargur
