= Jangaleh-ye Olya =

Jangaleh-ye Olya جنگله عليا
- Village
- Location within Iran
- Coordinates: 34°50′32″N 46°07′51″E
- Country: Iran
- Province: Kermanshah
- County: Salas-e Babajani
- Bakhsh: Central
- Rural District: Dasht-e Hor

Population (2006)
  - Total: 77
- Time zone: UTC+3:30 (IRST)
  - Summer (DST): UTC+4:30 (IRDT)

Jangaleh-ye Olya (Persian: جنگله عليا, also Romanized as Jangaleh-ye ‘Olyā; also known as Jangeh and Jangeh-ye ‘Olyā) is a village in Dasht-e Hor Rural District, in the Central District of Salas-e Babajani County, Kermanshah Province, Iran. At the 2006 census, its population was 77, in 17 families.
