= Gardel Gari Ali Aqa =

Gardel Gari Ali Aqa گردل گاري علي اقا
- Village
- Country: Iran
- Province: Kermanshah
- County: Salas-e Babajani
- Bakhsh: Ozgoleh
- Rural District: Ozgoleh

Population (2006)
  - Total: 68
- Time zone: UTC+3:30 (IRST)
  - Summer (DST): UTC+4:30 (IRDT)

Gardel Gari Ali Aqa (Persian: گردل گاري علي اقا, also Romanized as Gardel Gārī ʿAlī Aqā) is a village in Ozgoleh Rural District, Ozgoleh District, Salas-e Babajani County, Kermanshah Province, Iran. At the 2006 census, its population was 68, in 13 families.
