= Marzelan-e Mohammad Morad =

Marzelan-e Mohammad Morad مرزلان محمدمراد
- Village
- Location within Iran
- Coordinates: 34°39′01″N 46°07′45″E
- Country: Iran
- Province: Kermanshah
- County: Salas-e Babajani
- Bakhsh: Central
- Rural District: Dasht-e Hor

Population (2006)
  - Total: 135
- Time zone: UTC+3:30 (IRST)
  - Summer (DST): UTC+4:30 (IRDT)

Marzelan-e Mohammad Morad (Persian: مرزلان محمدمراد, also Romanized as Marzelān-e Moḩammad Morād; also known as Marzelān) is a village in Dasht-e Hor Rural District, in the Central District of Salas-e Babajani County, Kermanshah Province, Iran. At the 2006 census, its population was 135, in 27 families.
