= Ab Sorkh =

Ab Sorkh ابسرخ
- Village
- Location within Iran
- Coordinates: 34°53′49″N 46°04′14″E
- Country: Iran
- Province: Kermanshah
- County: Salas-e Babajani
- Bakhsh: Central
- Rural District: Khaneh Shur

Population (2006)
  - Total: 75
- Time zone: UTC+3:30 (IRST)
  - Summer (DST): UTC+4:30 (IRDT)

Ab Sorkh (Persian: ابسرخ, also Romanized as Āb Sorkh; also known as Āb Sorb) is a village in Khaneh Shur Rural District, in the Central District of Salas-e Babajani County, Kermanshah province, Iran. At the 2006 census, its population was 75, in 17 families.
