= Mollah Karamineh-e Shah Morad =

Mollah Karamineh-e Shah Morad مله كرمينه شاهمراد
- Village
- Location within Iran
- Coordinates: 34°41′56″N 45°59′28″E
- Country: Iran
- Province: Kermanshah
- County: Salas-e Babajani
- Bakhsh: Ozgoleh
- Rural District: Ozgoleh

Population (2006)
  - Total: 61
- Time zone: UTC+3:30 (IRST)
  - Summer (DST): UTC+4:30 (IRDT)

Mollah Karamineh-e Shah Morad (Persian: مله كرمينه شاهمراد, also Romanized as Mollah Karamīneh-e Shāh Morād; also known as Mollā Karamīneh-e Shāh Mār) is a village in Ozgoleh Rural District, Ozgoleh District, Salas-e Babajani County, Kermanshah Province, Iran. At the 2006 census, its population was 61, in 11 families.
