= Dari Zanganeh-ye Pain =

Dari Zanganeh-ye Pain داري زنگنه پايين
- Village
- Country: Iran
- Province: Kermanshah
- County: Salas-e Babajani
- Bakhsh: Ozgoleh
- Rural District: Ozgoleh

Population (2006)
  - Total: 113
- Time zone: UTC+3:30 (IRST)
  - Summer (DST): UTC+4:30 (IRDT)

Dari Zanganeh-ye Pain (Persian: داري زنگنه پايين, also Romanized as Dārī Zanganeh-ye Pā’īn) is a village in Ozgoleh Rural District, Ozgoleh District, Salas-e Babajani County, Kermanshah province, Iran. At the 2006 census, its population was 113, in 20 families.
