= Tappeh-ye Khargushan =

Tappeh-ye Khargushan تپه خرگوشان
- Village
- Location within Iran
- Coordinates: 34°42′02″N 46°16′52″E
- Country: Iran
- Province: Kermanshah
- County: Salas-e Babajani
- Bakhsh: Central
- Rural District: Zamkan

Population (2006)
  - Total: 243
- Time zone: UTC+3:30 (IRST)
  - Summer (DST): UTC+4:30 (IRDT)

Tappeh-ye Khargushan (Persian: تپه خرگوشان, also Romanized as Tappeh-ye Khargūshān) is a village in Zamkan Rural District, in the Central District of Salas-e Babajani County, Kermanshah Province, Iran. At the 2006 census, its population was 243, in 48 families.
