= Kani Karim Yarvali =

Kani Karim Yarvali كاني كريم يارولي
- Village
- Location within Iran
- Coordinates: 34°43′20″N 46°00′45″E
- Country: Iran
- Province: Kermanshah
- County: Salas-e Babajani
- Bakhsh: Ozgoleh
- Rural District: Ozgoleh

Population (2006)
  - Total: 28
- Time zone: UTC+3:30 (IRST)
  - Summer (DST): UTC+4:30 (IRDT)

Kani Karim Yarvali (Persian: كاني كريم يارولي, also Romanized as Kānī Karīm Yārvalī; also known as Kānī-ye Karīm Darmarān) is a village in Ozgoleh Rural District, Ozgoleh District, Salas-e Babajani County, Kermanshah Province, Iran. At the 2006 census, its population was 28, in 6 families.
