= Ainehvand =

Ainehvand or Aineh Vand (Persian: اينه وند) may refer to:

- Ainehvand-e Abdollah
- Ainehvand-e Darreh Rashteh
- Ayenehvand
- Aineh Vand, Sarpol-e Zahab
