= Ziarat-e Tamarkhan =

Ziarat-e Tamarkhan زيارت تمرخان
- Village
- Location within Iran
- Coordinates: 34°45′03″N 46°08′21″E
- Country: Iran
- Province: Kermanshah
- County: Salas-e Babajani
- Bakhsh: Central
- Rural District: Dasht-e Hor

Population (2006)
  - Total: 865
- Time zone: UTC+3:30 (IRST)
  - Summer (DST): UTC+4:30 (IRDT)

Ziarat-e Tamarkhan (Persian: زيارت تمرخان, also Romanized as Zīārat-e Tamarkhān; also known as Sharak-e Tamarkhān) is a village in Dasht-e Hor Rural District, in the Central District of Salas-e Babajani County, Kermanshah Province, Iran. At the 2006 census, its population was 865, in 180 families.
