= Darreh Asiab-e Rashid =

Darreh Asiab-e Rashid دره اسياب رشيد
- Village
- Country: Iran
- Province: Kermanshah
- County: Salas-e Babajani
- Bakhsh: Ozgoleh
- Rural District: Ozgoleh

Population (2006)
  - Total: 156
- Time zone: UTC+3:30 (IRST)
  - Summer (DST): UTC+4:30 (IRDT)

Darreh Asiab-e Rashid (Persian: دره اسياب رشيد, also Romanized as Darreh-Asīāb-e Rashīd) is a village in Ozgoleh Rural District, Ozgoleh District, Salas-e Babajani County, Kermanshah Province, Iran. At the 2006 census, its population was 156, in 28 families.
