= Vani Sar =

Vani Sar واني سر
- Village
- Location within Iran
- Coordinates: 34°48′24″N 46°05′47″E
- Country: Iran
- Province: Kermanshah
- County: Salas-e Babajani
- Bakhsh: Central
- Rural District: Khaneh Shur

Population (2006)
  - Total: 260
- Time zone: UTC+3:30 (IRST)
  - Summer (DST): UTC+4:30 (IRDT)

Vani Sar (Persian: واني سر, also Romanized as Vānī Sar; also known as Dārlī Sar) is a village in Khaneh Shur Rural District, in the Central District of Salas-e Babajani County, Kermanshah Province, Iran. At the 2006 census, its population was 260, in 61 families.
