= Esmail Aqai =

Esmail Aqai اسماعيل اقايي
- Village
- Location within Iran
- Coordinates: 34°55′16″N 45°58′13″E
- Country: Iran
- Province: Kermanshah
- County: Salas-e Babajani
- Bakhsh: Central
- Rural District: Khaneh Shur

Population (2006)
  - Total: 24
- Time zone: UTC+3:30 (IRST)
  - Summer (DST): UTC+4:30 (IRDT)

Esmail Aqai (Persian: اسماعيل اقايي, also Romanized as Esmā‘īl Āqā‘ī; also known as Esmā‘īl Āqā) is a village in Khaneh Shur Rural District, in the Central District of Salas-e Babajani County, Kermanshah Province, Iran. At the 2006 census, its population was 24, in 4 families.
