= Qap Qoli =

Qap Qoli قاپقلي
- Village
- Location within Iran
- Coordinates: 34°43′28″N 46°16′08″E
- Country: Iran
- Province: Kermanshah
- County: Salas-e Babajani
- Bakhsh: Central
- Rural District: Zamkan

Population (2006)
  - Total: 168
- Time zone: UTC+3:30 (IRST)
  - Summer (DST): UTC+4:30 (IRDT)

Qap Qoli (Persian: قاپقلي, also Romanized as Qāp Qolī; also known as Qāpī Qolī) is a village in Zamkan Rural District, in the Central District of Salas-e Babajani County, Kermanshah Province, Iran. At the 2006 census, its population was 168, in 40 families.
