= Bakhsh Now Khas =

Bakhsh Now Khas بخش نوخاص
- Village
- Country: Iran
- Province: Kermanshah
- County: Salas-e Babajani
- Bakhsh: Central
- Rural District: Khaneh Shur

Population (2006)
  - Total: 239
- Time zone: UTC+3:30 (IRST)
  - Summer (DST): UTC+4:30 (IRDT)

Bakhsh Now Khas (Persian: بخش نوخاص, also Romanized as Bakhsh Now Khāṣ) is a village in Khaneh Shur Rural District, in the Central District of Salas-e Babajani County, Kermanshah Province, Iran. At the 2006 census, its population was 239, in 48 families.
