= Ali Aqai =

Ali Aqai (Persian: علي اقايي) may refer to:

- Ali Aqai-ye Bala
- Ali Aqai-ye Pain
- Ali Aqai Hezarkhani
