= Qualeh Rash Vali =

Qualeh Rash Vali قوله رش والي
- Village
- Country: Iran
- Province: Kermanshah
- County: Salas-e Babajani
- Bakhsh: Central
- Rural District: Dasht-e Hor

Population (2006)
  - Total: 314
- Time zone: UTC+3:30 (IRST)
  - Summer (DST): UTC+4:30 (IRDT)

Qualeh Rash Vali (Persian: قوله رش والي, also Romanized as Qūaleh Rash Vālī) is a village in Dasht-e Hor Rural District, in the Central District of Salas-e Babajani County, Kermanshah Province, Iran. At the 2006 census, its population was 314, in 59 families.
