= Shahgodar =

Shahgodar or Shah Godar (Persian: شاه گدار) may refer to:

- Shah Godar, Kermanshah
- Shahgodar-e Mohammad, Kermanshah Province
- Shahgodar-e Zamkan, Kermanshah Province
- Shah Godar-e Sofla, Kurdistan Province
