= Shahrak-e Meydan Namak =

Shahrak-e Meydan Namak شهرك ميدان نمك
- Village
- Location within Iran
- Coordinates: 34°52′04″N 46°00′49″E
- Country: Iran
- Province: Kermanshah
- County: Salas-e Babajani
- Bakhsh: Central
- Rural District: Khaneh Shur

Population (2006)
  - Total: 320
- Time zone: UTC+3:30 (IRST)
  - Summer (DST): UTC+4:30 (IRDT)

Shahrak-e Meydan Namak (Persian: شهرك ميدان نمك, also Romanized as Shahrak-e Meydān Namak) is a village in Khaneh Shur Rural District, in the Central District of Salas-e Babajani County, Kermanshah Province, Iran. At the 2006 census, its population was 320, in 69 families.
