= Khosrow Basheh-ye Madeh Zaran =

Khosrow Basheh-ye Madeh Zaran خسروباشه ماده زاران
- Village
- Location within Iran
- Coordinates: 34°46′00″N 46°14′00″E
- Country: Iran
- Province: Kermanshah
- County: Salas-e Babajani
- Bakhsh: Central
- Rural District: Zamkan

Population (2006)
  - Total: 112
- Time zone: UTC+3:30 (IRST)
  - Summer (DST): UTC+4:30 (IRDT)

Khosrow Basheh-ye Madeh Zaran (Persian: خسروباشه ماده زاران, also Romanized as Khosrow Bāsheh-ye Mādeh Zārān; also known as Khosrow Bāsheh, Māveh Zārān, and Posht Gelah) is a village in Zamkan Rural District, in the Central District of Salas-e Babajani County, Kermanshah Province, Iran. At the 2006 census, its population was 112, in 26 families.
