= Gaveh-ye Seyyed Mohammad Hoseyni =

Gaveh-ye Seyyed Mohammad Hoseyni گوه سيدمحمدحسيني
- Village
- Country: Iran
- Province: Kermanshah
- County: Salas-e Babajani
- Bakhsh: Ozgoleh
- Rural District: Ozgoleh

Population (2006)
  - Total: 71
- Time zone: UTC+3:30 (IRST)
  - Summer (DST): UTC+4:30 (IRDT)

Gaveh-ye Seyyed Mohammad Hoseyni (Persian: گوه سيدمحمدحسيني, also Romanized as Gaveh-ye Seyyed Moḩammad Ḩoseynī) is a village in Ozgoleh Rural District, Ozgoleh District, Salas-e Babajani County, Kermanshah Province, Iran. At the 2006 census, its population was 71, in 15 families.
