= Nimeh Kareh Kani Rash =

Nimeh Kareh Kani Rash نيمه كاره كاني رش
- Village
- Country: Iran
- Province: Kermanshah
- County: Salas-e Babajani
- Bakhsh: Central
- Rural District: Khaneh Shur

Population (2006)
  - Total: 372
- Time zone: UTC+3:30 (IRST)
  - Summer (DST): UTC+4:30 (IRDT)

Nimeh Kareh Kani Rash (Persian: نيمه كاره كاني رش, also Romanized as Nīmeh Kāreh Kānī Rash) is a village in Khaneh Shur Rural District, in the Central District of Salas-e Babajani County, Kermanshah Province, Iran. At the 2006 census, its population was 372, in 72 families.
