= Haft Kani =

Haft Kani هفت كاني
- Village
- Location within Iran
- Coordinates: 34°47′59″N 45°59′06″E
- Country: Iran
- Province: Kermanshah
- County: Salas-e Babajani
- Bakhsh: Central
- Rural District: Khaneh Shur

Population (2006)
  - Total: 90
- Time zone: UTC+3:30 (IRST)
  - Summer (DST): UTC+4:30 (IRDT)

Haft Kani (Persian: هفت كاني, also Romanized as Haft Kānī) is a village in Khaneh Shur Rural District, in the Central District of Salas-e Babajani County, Kermanshah Province, Iran. At the 2006 census, its population was 90, in 20 families.
