= Anjirebus-e Sofla =

Anjirebus-e Sofla انجيربوس سفلي
- Village
- Location within Iran
- Coordinates: 34°46′04″N 46°06′02″E
- Country: Iran
- Province: Kermanshah
- County: Salas-e Babajani
- Bakhsh: Central
- Rural District: Dasht-e Hor

Population (2006)
  - Total: 63
- Time zone: UTC+3:30 (IRST)
  - Summer (DST): UTC+4:30 (IRDT)

Anjirebus-e Sofla (Persian: انجيربوس سفلي, also Romanized as Anjīrebūs-e Soflá; also known as Anjīrbājsī, Anjīrebūs, and Anjīrebūs-e Bālā) is a village in Dasht-e Hor Rural District, in the Central District of Salas-e Babajani County, Kermanshah Province, Iran. At the 2006 census, its population was 63, in 12 families.
