= Posht-e Aspar Barani =

Posht-e Aspar Barani پشت اسپرباراني
- Village
- Location within Iran
- Coordinates: 34°50′31″N 45°54′11″E
- Country: Iran
- Province: Kermanshah
- County: Salas-e Babajani
- Bakhsh: Ozgoleh
- Rural District: Ozgoleh

Population (2006)
  - Total: 15
- Time zone: UTC+3:30 (IRST)
  - Summer (DST): UTC+4:30 (IRDT)

Posht-e Aspar Barani (Persian: پشت اسپرباراني, also Romanized as Posht-e Aspar Bārānī; also known as Posht-e Aspar) is a village in Ozgoleh Rural District, Ozgoleh District, Salas-e Babajani County, Kermanshah Province, Iran. At the 2006 census, its population was 15, in five families. In recant years it has gone up.
