= Kani Khanjar =

Kani Khanjar كاني خنجر
- Village
- Location within Iran
- Coordinates: 34°48′31″N 45°58′57″E
- Country: Iran
- Province: Kermanshah
- County: Salas-e Babajani
- Bakhsh: Central
- Rural District: Khaneh Shur

Population (2006)
  - Total: 150
- Time zone: UTC+3:30 (IRST)
  - Summer (DST): UTC+4:30 (IRDT)

Kani Khanjar (Persian: كاني خنجر, also Romanized as Kānī Khanjar) is a village in Khaneh Shur Rural District, in the Central District of Salas-e Babajani County, Kermanshah Province, Iran. At the 2006 census, its population was 150, in 33 families.
