= Bani Pariab =

Bani Pariab باني پارياب
- Village
- Location within Iran
- Coordinates: 34°48′44″N 46°03′12″E
- Country: Iran
- Province: Kermanshah
- County: Salas-e Babajani
- Bakhsh: Central
- Rural District: Khaneh Shur

Population (2006)
  - Total: 191
- Time zone: UTC+3:30 (IRST)
  - Summer (DST): UTC+4:30 (IRDT)

Bani Pariab (Persian: باني پارياب, also Romanized as Bānī Pārīāb; also known as Bānī Pārīā) is a village in Khaneh Shur Rural District, in the Central District of Salas-e Babajani County, Kermanshah Province, Iran. At the 2006 census, its population was 191, in 37 families.
