= Cham Lameh-ye Osman =

Cham Lameh-ye Osman چم لمه عثمان
- Village
- Country: Iran
- Province: Kermanshah
- County: Salas-e Babajani
- Bakhsh: Central
- Rural District: Dasht-e Hor

Population (2006)
  - Total: 214
- Time zone: UTC+3:30 (IRST)
  - Summer (DST): UTC+4:30 (IRDT)

Cham Lameh-ye Osman (Persian: چم لمه عثمان, also Romanized as Cham Lameh-ye ʿOs̱mān) is a village in Dasht-e Hor Rural District, in the Central District of Salas-e Babajani County, Kermanshah Province, Iran. At the 2006 census, its population was 214, in 40 families.
