= Savar Beyg =

Savar Beyg سواربيگ
- Village
- Location within Iran
- Coordinates: 34°53′00″N 46°08′32″E
- Country: Iran
- Province: Kermanshah
- County: Salas-e Babajani
- Bakhsh: Central
- Rural District: Zamkan

Population (2006)
  - Total: 97
- Time zone: UTC+3:30 (IRST)
  - Summer (DST): UTC+4:30 (IRDT)

Savar Beyg (Persian: سواربيگ, also Romanized as Savār Beyg; also known as Bīlegī, Lāsavār, and Savār Bīlegī) is a village in Zamkan Rural District, in the Central District of Salas-e Babajani County, Kermanshah Province, Iran. At the 2006 census, its population was 97, in 19 families.
