= Cheshmeh-ye Mostafa Beyg =

Cheshmeh-ye Mostafa Beyg چشمه مصطفي بيگ
- Village
- Location within Iran
- Coordinates: 34°41′26″N 46°06′11″E
- Country: Iran
- Province: Kermanshah
- County: Salas-e Babajani
- Bakhsh: Central
- Rural District: Dasht-e Hor

Population (2006)
  - Total: 160
- Time zone: UTC+3:30 (IRST)
  - Summer (DST): UTC+4:30 (IRDT)

Cheshmeh-ye Mostafa Beyg (Persian: چشمه مصطفي بيگ, also Romanized as Cheshmeh-ye Moşţafá Beyg; also known as Cheshmeh-ye Moşţafá Beg) is a village in Dasht-e Hor Rural District, in the Central District of Salas-e Babajani County, Kermanshah Province, Iran. At the 2006 census, its population was 160, in 32 families.
