= Jujar =

Jujar (Persian: جوجار) may refer to:

- Jujar, Kermanshah
- Jujar, Salas-e Babajani, Kermanshah Province
- Jujar, Lorestan
