= Duleh Khoshk-e Aziz =

Duleh Khoshk-e Aziz دوله خشك عزيز
- Village
- Location within Iran
- Coordinates: 34°47′02″N 45°49′45″E
- Country: Iran
- Province: Kermanshah
- County: Salas-e Babajani
- Bakhsh: Ozgoleh
- Rural District: Ozgoleh

Population (2006)
  - Total: 86
- Time zone: UTC+3:30 (IRST)
  - Summer (DST): UTC+4:30 (IRDT)

Duleh Khoshk-e Aziz (Persian: دوله خشك عزيز, also Romanized as Dūleh Khoshk-e ʿAzīz; also known as Dūleh Khoshk-e Şāleḩī) is a village in Ozgoleh Rural District, Ozgoleh District, Salas-e Babajani County, Kermanshah Province, Iran. At the 2006 census, its population was 86, in 15 families.
