= Zalm Sur =

Zalm Sur ظلم سور
- Village
- Location within Iran
- Coordinates: 34°49′17″N 46°05′21″E
- Country: Iran
- Province: Kermanshah
- County: Salas-e Babajani
- Bakhsh: Central
- Rural District: Khaneh Shur

Population (2006)
  - Total: 115
- Time zone: UTC+3:30 (IRST)
  - Summer (DST): UTC+4:30 (IRDT)

Zalm Sur (Persian: ظلم سور, also Romanized as Z̧alm Sūr; also known as Z̧almeh Sūr, Z̧olmeh Nūr, and Z̧olmeh Sūr) is a village in Khaneh Shur Rural District, in the Central District of Salas-e Babajani County, Kermanshah Province, Iran. At the 2006 census, its population was 115, in 26 families.
