= Hasan Gaviyar =

Hasan Gaviyar حسن گاويار
- Village
- Location within Iran
- Coordinates: 34°39′00″N 46°04′48″E
- Country: Iran
- Province: Kermanshah
- County: Salas-e Babajani
- Bakhsh: Central
- Rural District: Dasht-e Hor

Population (2006)
  - Total: 155
- Time zone: UTC+3:30 (IRST)
  - Summer (DST): UTC+4:30 (IRDT)

Hasan Gaviyar (Persian: حسن گاويار, also Romanized as Ḩasan Gāvīyār; also known as Ḩasan Gāyār) is a village in Dasht-e Hor Rural District, in the Central District of Salas-e Babajani County, Kermanshah Province, Iran. At the 2006 census, its population was 155, in 30 families.
