= Melah Tulat =

Melah Tulat مله تولات
- Village
- Location within Iran
- Coordinates: 34°47′11″N 46°13′22″E
- Country: Iran
- Province: Kermanshah
- County: Salas-e Babajani
- Bakhsh: Central
- Rural District: Zamkan

Population (2006)
  - Total: 14
- Time zone: UTC+3:30 (IRST)
  - Summer (DST): UTC+4:30 (IRDT)

Melah Tulat (Persian: مله تولات, also Romanized as Melah Tūlāt; also known as Melahtūt and Melah Tūt) is a village in Zamkan Rural District, in the Central District of Salas-e Babajani County, Kermanshah Province, Iran. At the 2006 census, its population was 14, in 4 families.
