= Ab Dalan-e Mirki =

Ab Dalan-e Mirki ابدالان ميركي
- Village
- Location within Iran
- Coordinates: 34°48′37″N 45°52′52″E
- Country: Iran
- Province: Kermanshah
- County: Salas-e Babajani
- Bakhsh: Ozgoleh
- Rural District: Ozgoleh

Population (2006)
  - Total: 165
- Time zone: UTC+3:30 (IRST)
  - Summer (DST): UTC+4:30 (IRDT)

Ab Dalan-e Mirki (Persian: ابدالان ميركي, also Romanized as Āb Dālān-e Mīrkī; also known as Ābdālān) is a village in Ozgoleh Rural District, Ozgoleh District, Salas-e Babajani County, Kermanshah Province, Iran. At the 2006 census, its population was 165, in 32 families.
