= Kak Mirki =

Kak Mirki كاكميركي
- Village
- Location within Iran
- Coordinates: 34°47′56″N 45°53′45″E
- Country: Iran
- Province: Kermanshah
- County: Salas-e Babajani
- Bakhsh: Ozgoleh
- Rural District: Ozgoleh

Population (2006)
  - Total: 19
- Time zone: UTC+3:30 (IRST)
  - Summer (DST): UTC+4:30 (IRDT)

Kak Mirki (Persian: كاكميركي, also Romanized as Kāk Mīrkī; also known as Kolārah Mīrkī) is a village in Ozgoleh Rural District, Ozgoleh District, Salas-e Babajani County, Kermanshah Province, Iran. At the 2006 census, its population was 19, in 4 families.
