= Dashti Leyl-e Hoseynabad =

Dashti Leyl-e Hoseynabad دشتي ليل حسين اباد
- Village
- Location within Iran
- Coordinates: 34°39′31″N 46°14′22″E
- Country: Iran
- Province: Kermanshah
- County: Salas-e Babajani
- Bakhsh: Central
- Rural District: Zamkan

Population (2006)
  - Total: 172
- Time zone: UTC+3:30 (IRST)
  - Summer (DST): UTC+4:30 (IRDT)

Dashti Leyl-e Hoseynabad (Persian: دشتي ليل حسين اباد, also Romanized as Dashtī Leyl-e Ḩoseynābād; also known as Dasht-e Leyl) is a village in Zamkan Rural District, in the Central District of Salas-e Babajani County, Kermanshah Province, Iran. At the 2006 census, its population was 172, in 30 families.
