= Palek Mollah Karamineh =

Palek Mollah Karamineh پلك مله كرمينه
- Village
- Country: Iran
- Province: Kermanshah
- County: Salas-e Babajani
- Bakhsh: Ozgoleh
- Rural District: Ozgoleh

Population (2006)
  - Total: 36
- Time zone: UTC+3:30 (IRST)
  - Summer (DST): UTC+4:30 (IRDT)

Palek Mollah Karamineh (Persian: پلك مله كرمينه, also Romanized as Palek Mollah Karamīneh) is a village in Ozgoleh Rural District, Ozgoleh District, Salas-e Babajani County, Kermanshah Province, Iran. At the 2006 census, its population was 36, in 8 families.
