= Urazeh =

Urazeh عورازه
- Village
- Location within Iran
- Coordinates: 34°46′54″N 46°13′37″E
- Country: Iran
- Province: Kermanshah
- County: Salas-e Babajani
- Bakhsh: Central
- Rural District: Zamkan

Population (2006)
  - Total: 210
- Time zone: UTC+3:30 (IRST)
  - Summer (DST): UTC+4:30 (IRDT)

Urazeh (Persian: عورازه, also Romanized as Ūrāzeh; also known as Tamar Khān and Ūrāzū) is a village in Zamkan Rural District, in the Central District of Salas-e Babajani County, Kermanshah Province, Iran. At the 2006 census, its population was 210, in 46 families.
