= Cham Zereshk-e Sofla =

Cham Zereshk-e Sofla چم زرشك سفلي
- Village
- Location within Iran
- Coordinates: 34°40′11″N 46°07′43″E
- Country: Iran
- Province: Kermanshah
- County: Salas-e Babajani
- Bakhsh: Central
- Rural District: Dasht-e Hor

Population (2006)
  - Total: 263
- Time zone: UTC+3:30 (IRST)
  - Summer (DST): UTC+4:30 (IRDT)

Cham Zereshk-e Sofla (Persian: چم زرشك سفلي, also Romanized as Cham Zereshk-e Soflá) is a village in Dasht-e Hor Rural District, in the Central District of Salas-e Babajani County, Kermanshah Province, Iran. At the 2006 census, its population was 263, in 50 families.
