= Zhalan Tappeh Kakeh Aziz =

Zhalan Tappeh Kakeh Aziz ژالان تپه كاكه عزيز
- Village
- Country: Iran
- Province: Kermanshah
- County: Salas-e Babajani
- Bakhsh: Ozgoleh
- Rural District: Ozgoleh

Population (2006)
  - Total: 108
- Time zone: UTC+3:30 (IRST)
  - Summer (DST): UTC+4:30 (IRDT)

Zhalan Tappeh Kakeh Aziz (Persian: ژالان تپه كاكه عزيز, also Romanized as Zhālān Tappeh Kākeh ʿAzīz) is a village in Ozgoleh Rural District, Ozgoleh District, Salas-e Babajani County, Kermanshah Province, Iran. At the 2006 census, its population was 108, in 15 families.
