= Davaleh =

Davaleh (Persian: دواله) may refer to:

- Davaleh-ye Olya
- Davaleh-ye Sofla
