= Zhalan =

Zhalan (Persian: ژالان) may refer to:

- Zhalan Rashid
- Zhalan Tappeh Kakeh Aziz

Zhalan (Chinese: 栅栏) means "fence" and is part of the name of the Zhalan Cemetery (Chinese: 栅栏墓地) in Beijing.
