= Bangar-e Sofla =

Bangar-e Sofla بانگار سفلي
- Village
- Interactive map of Bangar-e Sofla
- Coordinates: 34.5402°N 45.5341°E
- Country: Iran
- Province: Kermanshah
- County: Salas-e Babajani
- Bakhsh: Ozgoleh
- Rural District: Ozgoleh

Population (2006)
  - Total: 61
- Time zone: UTC+3:30 (IRST)
  - Summer (DST): UTC+4:30 (IRDT)

Bangar-e Sofla (Persian: بانگار سفلي, also Romanized as Bāngār-e Soflá) is a village in Ozgoleh Rural District, Ozgoleh District, Salas-e Babajani County, Kermanshah Province, Iran. At the 2006 census, its population was 61, in 12 families.
