= Seh Tapan, Kermanshah =

Seh Tapan سه تپان
- Village
- Location within Iran
- Coordinates: 34°47′09″N 46°04′35″E
- Country: Iran
- Province: Kermanshah
- County: Salas-e Babajani
- Bakhsh: Central
- Rural District: Khaneh Shur

Population (2006)
  - Total: 49
- Time zone: UTC+3:30 (IRST)
  - Summer (DST): UTC+4:30 (IRDT)

Seh Tapan (Persian: سه تپان, also Romanized as Seh Tapān and Sehtapān; also known as Setāpān) is a village in Khaneh Shur Rural District, in the Central District of Salas-e Babajani County, Kermanshah Province, Iran. At the 2006 census, its population was 49, in 11 families.
