= Darreh Lar =

Darreh Lar (Persian: داره لار) may refer to:

- Darreh Lar Abdol Karim
- Darreh Lar Karim
