= Ali Aqai-ye Pain =

Ali Aqai-ye Pain علي اقايي پايين
- Village
- Location within Iran
- Coordinates: 34°46′11″N 45°48′07″E
- Country: Iran
- Province: Kermanshah
- County: Salas-e Babajani
- Bakhsh: Ozgoleh
- Rural District: Ozgoleh

Population (2006)
  - Total: 13
- Time zone: UTC+3:30 (IRST)
  - Summer (DST): UTC+4:30 (IRDT)

Ali Aqai-ye Pain (Persian: علي اقايي پايين, also Romanized as ‘Alī Āqā'ī-ye Pā'īn) is a village in Ozgoleh Rural District, Ozgoleh District, Salas-e Babajani County, Kermanshah Province, Iran. At the 2006 census, its population was 13, in 5 families.
