= Darneh, Kermanshah =

Darneh درنه
- Village
- Location within Iran
- Coordinates: 34°47′24″N 46°10′10″E
- Country: Iran
- Province: Kermanshah
- County: Salas-e Babajani
- Bakhsh: Central
- Rural District: Dasht-e Hor

Population (2006)
  - Total: 27
- Time zone: UTC+3:30 (IRST)
  - Summer (DST): UTC+4:30 (IRDT)

Darneh (Persian: درنه) is a village in Dasht-e Hor Rural District, in the Central District of Salas-e Babajani County, Kermanshah Province, Iran. At the 2006 census, its population was 27, in 6 families.

== Notable people ==
- Khana Qubadi
