= Deh Huleh-ye Sofla =

Deh Huleh-ye Sofla ده هوله سفلي
- Village
- Location within Iran
- Coordinates: 34°50′55″N 46°02′16″E
- Country: Iran
- Province: Kermanshah
- County: Salas-e Babajani
- Bakhsh: Central
- Rural District: Khaneh Shur

Population (2006)
  - Total: 118
- Time zone: UTC+3:30 (IRST)
  - Summer (DST): UTC+4:30 (IRDT)

Deh Huleh-ye Sofla (Persian: ده هوله سفلي, also Romanized as Deh Hūleh-ye Soflá; also known as Darreh Ḩūleh and Hūleh-ye Soflá) is a village in Khaneh Shur Rural District, in the Central District of Salas-e Babajani County, Kermanshah Province, Iran. At the 2006 census, its population was 118, in 25 families.
