= Taleh Tut, Dasht-e Hor =

Taleh Tut تله توت
- Village
- Location within Iran
- Coordinates: 34°49′04″N 46°08′27″E
- Country: Iran
- Province: Kermanshah
- County: Salas-e Babajani
- Bakhsh: Central
- Rural District: Dasht-e Hor

Population (2006)
  - Total: 41
- Time zone: UTC+3:30 (IRST)
  - Summer (DST): UTC+4:30 (IRDT)

Taleh Tut (Persian: تله توت, also Romanized as Taleh Tūt and Talah Tūt; also known as Qal’eh Tūt-e Soflá, Taleh Tū, and Taleh Tūh) is a village in Dasht-e Hor Rural District, in the Central District of Salas-e Babajani County, Kermanshah Province, Iran. At the 2006 census, its population was 41, in 7 families.
