= Ayenehvand =

Ayenehvand ائينه وند
- Village
- Location within Iran
- Coordinates: 34°38′47″N 46°05′36″E
- Country: Iran
- Province: Kermanshah
- County: Salas-e Babajani
- Bakhsh: Central
- Rural District: Dasht-e Hor

Population (2006)
  - Total: 163
- Time zone: UTC+3:30 (IRST)
  - Summer (DST): UTC+4:30 (IRDT)

Ayenehvand (Persian: ائينه وند, also Romanized as Āyenehvand; also known as Ā'īnehvand) is a village in Dasht-e Hor Rural District, in the Central District of Salas-e Babajani County, Kermanshah Province, Iran. At the 2006 census, its population was 163, in 28 families.
