= Kugah, Kermanshah =

Kugah كوگاه
- Village
- Location within Iran
- Coordinates: 34°49′08″N 46°09′54″E
- Country: Iran
- Province: Kermanshah
- County: Salas-e Babajani
- Bakhsh: Central
- Rural District: Zamkan

Population (2006)
  - Total: 105
- Time zone: UTC+3:30 (IRST)
  - Summer (DST): UTC+4:30 (IRDT)

Kugah (Persian: كوگاه, also Romanized as Kūgāh; also known as Kūgā-ye ‘Olyā) is a village in Zamkan Rural District, in the Central District of Salas-e Babajani County, Kermanshah Province, Iran. At the 2006 census, its population was 105, in 21 families.
