= Qolqoleh, Salas-e Babajani =

Village in Kermanshah province, Iran

Qolqoleh Persian: قلقله
- Village
- Location within Iran
- Coordinates: 34°43′06″N 46°10′31″E
- Country: Iran
- Province: Kermanshah
- County: Salas-e Babajani
- District: Central
- Rural District: Dasht-e Hor

Population (2016)
  - Total: 839
- Time zone: UTC+3:30 (IRST)

Qolqoleh (Persian: قلقله) (Note: Also known as Qolgoleh) is a village in, and the capital of, Dasht-e Hor Rural District of the Central District of Salas-e Babajani County, Kermanshah province, Iran.

== Demographics ==
=== Population ===
At the time of the 2006 National Census, the village's population was 765 in 171 households. The following census in 2011 counted 963 people in 227 households. The 2016 census measured the population of the village as 839 people in 225 households.
