= Tappeh Kabud-e Sofla Abdol Mohammad =

Tappeh Kabud-e Sofla Abdol Mohammad تپه كبودسفلي عبدل محمد
- Village
- Country: Iran
- Province: Kermanshah
- County: Salas-e Babajani
- Bakhsh: Ozgoleh
- Rural District: Ozgoleh

Population (2006)
  - Total: 155
- Time zone: UTC+3:30 (IRST)
  - Summer (DST): UTC+4:30 (IRDT)

Tappeh Kabud-e Sofla Abdol Mohammad (Persian: تپه كبودسفلي عبدل محمد, also Romanized as Tappeh Kabūd-e Soflá ʿAbdol Moḩammad) is a village in Ozgoleh Rural District, Ozgoleh District, Salas-e Babajani County, Kermanshah Province, Iran. At the 2006 census, its population was 155, in 29 families.
