= Darnileh =

Darnileh (Persian: دارنيله) may refer to:

- Darnileh-ye Aziz
- Darnileh-ye Eskandar
