= Shah Gozar =

Shah Gozar (Persian: شاه گزار) may refer to:

- Shah Gozar, Kermanshah
- Shah Gozar, Kurdistan
