= Abdol Khakhi-ye Sofla =

Abdol Khakhi-ye Sofla عبدل خاكي سفلي
- Village
- Country: Iran
- Province: Kermanshah
- County: Salas-e Babajani
- Bakhsh: Central
- Rural District: Zamkan

Population (2006)
  - Total: 164
- Time zone: UTC+3:30 (IRST)
  - Summer (DST): UTC+4:30 (IRDT)

Abdol Khakhi-ye Sofla (Persian: عبدل خاكي سفلي, also Romanized as ʿAbdol Khākī-ye Soflá) is a village in Zamkan Rural District, in the Zamkan District of Salas-e Babajani County, Kermanshah Province, Iran. At the 2006 census, its population was 164, in 38 families.
