= Neyrazh =

Neyrazh (Persian: نيرژ) may refer to:

- Neyrazh-e Olya
- Neyrazh-e Sofla
