= Ali Aqai-ye Bala-ye Bani Chenur =

Ali Aqai-ye Bala-ye Bani Chenur علي اقايي بالايي باني چنور
- Village
- Location within Iran
- Coordinates: 34°46′24″N 45°49′21″E
- Country: Iran
- Province: Kermanshah
- County: Salas-e Babajani
- Bakhsh: Ozgoleh
- Rural District: Ozgoleh

Population (2006)
  - Total: 37
- Time zone: UTC+3:30 (IRST)
  - Summer (DST): UTC+4:30 (IRDT)

Ali Aqai-ye Bala-ye Bani Chenur (Persian: علي اقايي بالايي باني چنور, also Romanized as ‘Alī Āqā'ī-ye Bālā-ye Bānī Chenūr; also known as ‘Alī Āqā'ī-ye Bālā) is a village in Ozgoleh Rural District, Ozgoleh District, Salas-e Babajani County, Kermanshah Province, Iran. At the 2006 census, its population was 37, in 9 families.
