= Mirabad, Kermanshah =

Village in Kermanshah province, Iran

Mirabad Persian: ميراباد
- Village
- Location within Iran
- Coordinates: 34°41′13″N 46°17′46″E
- Country: Iran
- Province: Kermanshah
- County: Salas-e Babajani
- District: Zamkan
- Rural District: Zamkan-e Jonubi

Population (2016)
  - Total: 966
- Time zone: UTC+3:30 (IRST)

Mirabad (Persian: ميراباد) (Note: Also romanized as Mīrābād) is a village in Zamkan-e Jonubi Rural District (Note: Formerly Zamkan Rural District) of Zamkan District, Salas-e Babajani County, Kermanshah province, Iran, serving as capital of both the district and the rural district.

== Demographics ==
=== Population ===
At the time of the 2006 National Census, the village's population was 1,069 in 235 households, when it was in Zamkan Rural District (Note: Renamed Zamkan-e Jonubi Rural District) of the Central District. The following census in 2011 counted 1,144 people in 283 households. The 2016 census measured the population of the village as 966 people in 260 households. It was the most populous village in its rural district.

In 2019, the rural district was separated from the district in the formation of Zamkan District and renamed Zamkan-e Jonubi Rural District.
