= Melah Kabud, Salas-e Babajani =

Melah Kabud مله كبود
- Village
- Location within Iran
- Coordinates: 34°55′12″N 46°06′23″E
- Country: Iran
- Province: Kermanshah
- County: Salas-e Babajani
- Bakhsh: Central
- Rural District: Zamkan

Population (2006)
  - Total: 102
- Time zone: UTC+3:30 (IRST)
  - Summer (DST): UTC+4:30 (IRDT)

Melah Kabud (Persian: مله كبود, also Romanized as Melah Kabūd) is a village in Zamkan Rural District, in the Central District of Salas-e Babajani County, Kermanshah Province, Iran. At the 2006 census, its population was 102, in 20 families.
