= Davaleh-ye Sofla =

Davaleh-ye Sofla دواله سفلي
- Village
- Location within Iran
- Coordinates: 34°46′00″N 46°14′00″E
- Country: Iran
- Province: Kermanshah
- County: Salas-e Babajani
- Bakhsh: Central
- Rural District: Zamkan

Population (2006)
  - Total: 45
- Time zone: UTC+3:30 (IRST)
  - Summer (DST): UTC+4:30 (IRDT)

Davaleh-ye Sofla (Persian: دواله سفلي, also Romanized as Davāleh-ye Soflá; also known as Davāleh Pā’īn) is a village in Zamkan Rural District, in the Central District of Salas-e Babajani County, Kermanshah Province, Iran. At the 2006 census, its population was 45, in 11 families.
