= Abdol Khakhi-ye Olya =

Abdol Khakhi-ye Olya عبدل خاكي عليا
- Village
- Country: Iran
- Province: Kermanshah
- County: Salas-e Babajani
- Bakhsh: Central
- Rural District: Zamkan

Population (2006)
  - Total: 95
- Time zone: UTC+3:30 (IRST)
  - Summer (DST): UTC+4:30 (IRDT)

Abdol Khakhi-ye Olya (Persian: عبدل خاكي عليا, also Romanized as ʿAbdol Khākī-ye ‘Olyā) is a village in Zamkan Rural District, in the Central District of Salas-e Babajani County, Kermanshah Province, Iran. At the 2006 census, its population was 95, in 27 families.
