= Darreh Zhaleh-ye Olya =

Darreh Zhaleh-ye Olya دره ژاله عليا
- Village
- Location within Iran
- Coordinates: 34°49′17″N 45°49′03″E
- Country: Iran
- Province: Kermanshah
- County: Salas-e Babajani
- Bakhsh: Ozgoleh
- Rural District: Ozgoleh

Population (2006)
  - Total: 20
- Time zone: UTC+3:30 (IRST)
  - Summer (DST): UTC+4:30 (IRDT)

Darreh Zhaleh-ye Olya (Persian: دره ژاله عليا, also Romanized as Darreh Zhāleh-ye 'Olyā; also known as Darreh Zhāleh-ye Bālā) is a village in Ozgoleh Rural District, Ozgoleh District, Salas-e Babajani County, Kermanshah province, Iran. At the 2006 census, its population was 20, in 5 families.
