= Cham Zereshk-e Esperi =

Cham Zereshk-e Esperi چم زرشك اسپري
- Village
- Location within Iran
- Coordinates: 34°40′44″N 46°07′29″E
- Country: Iran
- Province: Kermanshah
- County: Salas-e Babajani
- Bakhsh: Central
- Rural District: Dasht-e Hor

Population (2006)
  - Total: 470
- Time zone: UTC+3:30 (IRST)
  - Summer (DST): UTC+4:30 (IRDT)

Cham Zereshk-e Esperi (Persian: چم زرشك اسپري, also Romanized as Cham Zereshk-e Esperī; also known as Cheshm-e Zereshk Esperī and Marzeh Jār) is a village in Dasht-e Hor Rural District, in the Central District of Salas-e Babajani County, Kermanshah Province, Iran. At the 2006 census, its population was 470, in 104 families.
