= Abdol Khakhi =

Abdol Khakhi (Persian: عبدل خاكي) may refer to:

- Abdol Khakhi-ye Olya
- Abdol Khakhi-ye Sofla
