= Darnileh-ye Eskandar =

Darnileh-ye Eskandar دارنيله اسكندر
- Village
- Location within Iran
- Coordinates: 34°42′02″N 46°01′08″E
- Country: Iran
- Province: Kermanshah
- County: Salas-e Babajani
- Bakhsh: Ozgoleh
- Rural District: Ozgoleh

Population (2006)
  - Total: 27
- Time zone: UTC+3:30 (IRST)
  - Summer (DST): UTC+4:30 (IRDT)

Darnileh-ye Eskandar (Persian: دارنيله اسكندر, also Romanized as Dārnīleh-ye Eskandar; also known as Dār-e Nīlehgār) is a village in Ozgoleh Rural District, Ozgoleh District, Salas-e Babajani County, Kermanshah Province, Iran. At the 2006 census, its population was 27, in 6 families.
