= Choqamaran-e Bargur =

Choqamaran-e Bargur چقاماران برگور
- Village
- Location within Iran
- Coordinates: 34°47′00″N 46°01′00″E
- Country: Iran
- Province: Kermanshah
- County: Salas-e Babajani
- Bakhsh: Central
- Rural District: Khaneh Shur

Population (2006)
  - Total: 95
- Time zone: UTC+3:30 (IRST)
  - Summer (DST): UTC+4:30 (IRDT)

Choqamaran-e Bargur (Persian: چقاماران برگور, also Romanized as Choqāmārān-e Bargūr; also known as Choqā Mārū) is a village in Khaneh Shur Rural District, in the Central District of Salas-e Babajani County, Kermanshah Province, Iran. At the 2006 census, its population was 95, in 17 families.
