= Bangar, Iran =

Bangar (Persian: بانگار) in Iran may refer to:

- Bangar-e Olya
- Bangar-e Sofla
