= Shahgodar-e Zamkan =

Shahgodar-e Zamkan شاه گدارزمكان
- Village
- Country: Iran
- Province: Kermanshah
- County: Salas-e Babajani
- Bakhsh: Central
- Rural District: Zamkan

Population (2006)
  - Total: 154
- Time zone: UTC+3:30 (IRST)
  - Summer (DST): UTC+4:30 (IRDT)

Shahgodar-e Zamkan (Persian: شاه گدارزمكان, also Romanized as Shāhgodār-e Zamkān) is a village in Zamkan Rural District, in the Central District of Salas-e Babajani County, Kermanshah Province, Iran. At the 2006 census, its population was 154, in 31 families.
