= Haramian =

Haramian (Persian: حرميان) may refer to:

- Haramian-e Olya
- Haramian-e Sofla
