= Kugah =

Kugah (Persian: كوگاه) may refer to:

- Kugah, Gilan
- Kugah, Kermanshah
