= Darreh Zhaleh =

Darreh Zhaleh (Persian: دره ژاله) may refer to:

- Darreh Zhaleh-ye Olya
- Darreh Zhaleh-ye Sofla
