= Negareh =

Village in Kermanshah province, Iran

Negareh Persian: نگره
- Village
- Location within Iran
- Coordinates: 34°53′50″N 46°00′51″E
- Country: Iran
- Province: Kermanshah
- County: Salas-e Babajani
- District: Central
- Rural District: Khaneh Shur

Population (2016)
  - Total: 308
- Time zone: UTC+3:30 (IRST)

Negareh (Persian: نگره) (Note: Also known as Tīreh ‘Alī) is a village in, and the capital of, Khaneh Shur Rural District of the Central District of Salas-e Babajani County, Kermanshah province, Iran. The previous capital of the rural district was the village of Deh-e Sheykh.

== Demographics ==
=== Population ===
At the time of the 2006 National Census, the village's population was 457 in 104 households. The following census in 2011 counted 391 people in 89 households. The 2016 census measured the population of the village as 308 people in 79 households.
