= Deh Huleh-ye Olya =

Deh Huleh-ye Olya ده هوله عليا
- Village
- Location within Iran
- Coordinates: 34°51′19″N 46°03′12″E
- Country: Iran
- Province: Kermanshah
- County: Salas-e Babajani
- Bakhsh: Central
- Rural District: Khaneh Shur

Population (2006)
  - Total: 188
- Time zone: UTC+3:30 (IRST)
  - Summer (DST): UTC+4:30 (IRDT)

Deh Huleh-ye Olya (Persian: ده هوله عليا, also Romanized as Deh Hūleh-ye ‘Olyā; also known as Ḩūleh and Ḩūleh-ye ‘Olyā) is a village in Khaneh Shur Rural District, in the Central District of Salas-e Babajani County, Kermanshah Province, Iran. At the 2006 census, its population was 188, in 48 families.
