= Davaleh-ye Olya =

Davaleh-ye Olya دواله عليا
- Village
- Location within Iran
- Coordinates: 34°45′37″N 46°13′57″E
- Country: Iran
- Province: Kermanshah
- County: Salas-e Babajani
- Bakhsh: Central
- Rural District: Zamkan

Population (2006)
  - Total: 147
- Time zone: UTC+3:30 (IRST)
  - Summer (DST): UTC+4:30 (IRDT)

Davaleh-ye Olya (Persian: دواله عليا, also Romanized as Davāleh-ye ‘Olyā; also known as Davāleh and Davāleh Bānmīrī) is a village in Zamkan Rural District, in the Central District of Salas-e Babajani County, Kermanshah Province, Iran. In the 2006 census, its population was recorded as 147, in 35 families.
