= Kezi, Iran =

Kezi كزي
- Village
- Location within Iran
- Coordinates: 34°51′54″N 46°08′23″E
- Country: Iran
- Province: Kermanshah
- County: Salas-e Babajani
- Bakhsh: Central
- Rural District: Zamkan

Population (2006)
  - Total: 157
- Time zone: UTC+3:30 (IRST)
  - Summer (DST): UTC+4:30 (IRDT)

Kezi (Persian: كزي, also Romanized as Kezī; also known as Kezeh) is a village in Zamkan Rural District, in the Central District of Salas-e Babajani County, Kermanshah Province, Iran. At the 2006 census, its population was 157, in 35 families.
