= Chahar Divar =

Chahar Divar (Persian: چهارديوار) may refer to:

- Chahar Divar, Kermanshah
- Chahar Divar, West Azerbaijan
