= Haramian-e Sofla =

Haramian-e Sofla حرميان سفلي
- Village
- Location within Iran
- Coordinates: 34°49′28″N 46°01′27″E
- Country: Iran
- Province: Kermanshah
- County: Salas-e Babajani
- Bakhsh: Central
- Rural District: Khaneh Shur

Population (2006)
  - Total: 124
- Time zone: UTC+3:30 (IRST)
  - Summer (DST): UTC+4:30 (IRDT)

Haramian-e Sofla (Persian: حرميان سفلي, also Romanized as Ḩaramīān-e Soflá) is a village in Khaneh Shur Rural District, in the Central District of Salas-e Babajani County, Kermanshah Province, Iran. At the 2006 census, its population was 124, in 21 families.
