= Sheykh Saleh =

Sheykh Saleh (Persian: شيخ صالح or شيخ صله) may refer to:

- Sheykh Saleh, Kermanshah (شيخ صله - Sheykh Saleh)
- Sheykh Saleh, Dasht-e Azadegan, Khuzestan province (شيخ صالح - Sheykh Şāleḥ)
- Sheykh Saleh, Shush, Khuzestan province (شيخ صالح - Sheykh Şāleḥ)
- Sheykh Salleh, Kermanshah province (شێخ سەڵە - Sheykh Salleh)

== See also ==
- Sheykh Saleh Qandi
