= Taleh Tut =

Taleh Tut or Talah Tut (Persian: تله توت) may refer to:

- Taleh Tut, Dasht-e Hor
- Taleh Tut, Khaneh Shur
