= Darnileh-ye Aziz =

Darnileh-ye Aziz دارنيله عزيز
- Village
- Location within Iran
- Coordinates: 34°42′39″N 45°59′45″E
- Country: Iran
- Province: Kermanshah
- County: Salas-e Babajani
- Bakhsh: Ozgoleh
- Rural District: Ozgoleh

Population (2006)
  - Total: 137
- Time zone: UTC+3:30 (IRST)
  - Summer (DST): UTC+4:30 (IRDT)

Darnileh-ye Aziz (Persian: دارنيله عزيز, also Romanized as Dārnīleh-ye ʿAzīz; also known as Dārnīleh) is a village in Ozgoleh Rural District, Ozgoleh District, Salas-e Babajani County, Kermanshah Province, Iran. At the 2006 census, its population was 137, in 29 families.
