= Bangar-e Olya =

Coordinates: 34.8325°N 45.8433°E

Bangar-e Olya بانگار عليا
- Village
- Interactive map of Bangar-e Olya
- Country: Iran
- Province: Kermanshah
- County: Salas-e Babajani
- Bakhsh: Ozgoleh
- Rural District: Ozgoleh

Population (2006)
  - Total: 100
- Time zone: UTC+3:30 (IRST)
  - Summer (DST): UTC+4:30 (IRDT)

Bangar-e Olya (Persian: بانگار عليا, also Romanized as Bāngār-e ‘Olyā) is a village in Ozgoleh Rural District, Ozgoleh District, Salas-e Babajani County, Kermanshah Province, Iran. At the 2006 census, its population was 100, in 23 families.
