= Cham Zereshk-e Choqavian Gol Morad =

Cham Zereshk-e Choqavian Gol Morad چم زرشك چقاويان گل مراد
- Village
- Location within Iran
- Coordinates: 34°41′00″N 46°07′00″E
- Country: Iran
- Province: Kermanshah
- County: Salas-e Babajani
- Bakhsh: Central
- Rural District: Dasht-e Hor

Population (2006)
  - Total: 98
- Time zone: UTC+3:30 (IRST)
  - Summer (DST): UTC+4:30 (IRDT)

Cham Zereshk-e Choqavian Gol Morad (Persian: چم زرشك چقاويان گل مراد, also Romanized as Cham Zereshk-e Choqāvīān Gol Morād; also known as Cham Zereshk-e Choqāvīān) is a village in Dasht-e Hor Rural District, in the Central District of Salas-e Babajani County, Kermanshah Province, Iran. At the 2006 census, its population was 98, in 19 families.
