= Seh Tapan Aziz =

Seh Tapan Aziz سه تپان عزيز
- Village
- Country: Iran
- Province: Kermanshah
- County: Salas-e Babajani
- Bakhsh: Ozgoleh
- Rural District: Jeygaran

Population (2006)
  - Total: 118
- Time zone: UTC+3:30 (IRST)
  - Summer (DST): UTC+4:30 (IRDT)

Seh Tapan Aziz (Persian: سه تپان عزيز, also Romanized as Seh Tapān ʿAzīz) is a village in Jeygaran Rural District, Ozgoleh District, Salas-e Babajani County, Kermanshah Province, Iran. At the 2006 census, its population was 118, in 25 families.
