= Sheykh Salleh =

Village in Kermanshah province, Iran

Sheykh Salleh Persian: شيخ سله
- Village
- Location within Iran
- Coordinates: 34°58′15″N 45°55′35″E
- Country: Iran
- Province: Kermanshah
- County: Salas-e Babajani
- District: Central
- Rural District: Khaneh Shur

Population (2016)
  - Total: 1,425
- Time zone: UTC+3:30 (IRST)

Sheykh Salleh (Persian: شيخ صله) (Note: Also romanized as Şêx Seĺe and Sheykh Saleh; (Kurdish: شێخ سەڵە)) is a village in Khaneh Shur Rural District of the Central District of Salas-e Babajani County, Kermanshah province, Iran.

== Demographics ==
=== Population ===
At the time of the 2006 National Census, the village's population was 829 in 173 households. The following census in 2011 counted 1,172 people in 288 households. The 2016 census measured the population of the village as 1,425 people in 393 households. It was the most populous village in its rural district.
