= Ainehvand-e Abdollah =

Ainehvand-e Abdollah اينه وندعبدالله
- Village
- Country: Iran
- Province: Kermanshah
- County: Salas-e Babajani
- Bakhsh: Ozgoleh
- Rural District: Jeygaran

Population (2006)
  - Total: 95
- Time zone: UTC+3:30 (IRST)
  - Summer (DST): UTC+4:30 (IRDT)

Ainehvand-e Abdollah (Persian: اينه وندعبدالله, also Romanized as Aīnehvand-e ʿAbdollah) is a village in Jeygaran Rural District, Ozgoleh District, Salas-e Babajani County, Kermanshah Province, Iran. At the 2006 census, its population was 95, in 21 families.
