= Huleh =

Huleh may refer to:

- Hula Valley, Israel
- Huleh, Iran (disambiguation), places in Iran
