= Tappeh Kabud-e Sofla =

Tappeh Kabud-e Sofla تپه كبودسفلي
- Village
- Location within Iran
- Coordinates: 34°40′43″N 45°49′53″E
- Country: Iran
- Province: Kermanshah
- County: Salas-e Babajani
- Bakhsh: Ozgoleh
- Rural District: Jeygaran

Population (2006)
  - Total: 307
- Time zone: UTC+3:30 (IRST)
  - Summer (DST): UTC+4:30 (IRDT)

Tappeh Kabud-e Sofla (Persian: تپه كبودسفلي, also Romanized as Tappeh Kabūd-e Soflá; also known as Tappeh Kabūd-e Pā’īn) is a village in Jeygaran Rural District, Ozgoleh District, Salas-e Babajani County, Kermanshah Province, Iran. At the 2006 census, its population was 307, in 57 families.
