= Zamkan-e Shomali Rural District =

Rural district in Kermanshah province, Iran

Zamkan-e Shomali Rural District Rural District Persian: دهستان زمکان شمالی
- Rural District
- Location within Iran
- Coordinates: 34°49′36″N 46°10′02″E
- Country: Iran
- Province: Kermanshah
- County: Salas-e Babajani
- District: Zamkan
- Capital: Khomgaran
- Time zone: UTC+3:30 (IRST)

Zamkan-e Shomali Rural District Rural District (Persian: دهستان زمکان شمالی) is in Zamkan District of Salas-e Babajani County, Kermanshah province, Iran. Its capital is the village of Khomgaran, whose population at the time of the 2016 National Census was 108 in 29 households.

== History ==
In 2019, Zamkan Rural District (Note: Renamed Zamkan-e Jonubi Rural District) was separated from the Central District in the formation of Zamkan District, and Zamkan-e Shomali Rural District was created in the new district.
