= Darreh Zhaleh-ye Sofla =

Village in Kermanshah province, Iran

Darreh Zhaleh-ye Sofla Persian: دره ژاله سفلي
- Village
- Location within Iran
- Coordinates: 34°48′22″N 45°50′10″E
- Country: Iran
- Province: Kermanshah
- County: Salas-e Babajani
- District: Ezgeleh
- Rural District: Ezgeleh

Population (2016)
  - Total: 196
- Time zone: UTC+3:30 (IRST)

Darreh Zhaleh-ye Sofla (Persian: دره ژاله سفلي) (Note: Also romanized as Darreh Zhāleh-ye Soflá; also known as Darreh Zhāleh-ye Pā'īn) is a village in Ezgeleh Rural District of Ezgeleh District, Salas-e Babajani County, Kermanshah province, Iran.

== Demographics ==
=== Population ===
At the time of the 2006 National Census, the village's population was 187 in 46 households. The following census in 2011 counted 148 people in 42 households. The 2016 census measured the population of the village as 196 people in 63 households. It was the most populous village in its rural district.
