= Ainehvand-e Darreh Rashteh =

Ainehvand-e Darreh Rashteh اينه وندداره رشته
- Village
- Country: Iran
- Province: Kermanshah
- County: Salas-e Babajani
- Bakhsh: Ozgoleh
- Rural District: Jeygaran

Population (2006)
  - Total: 79
- Time zone: UTC+3:30 (IRST)
  - Summer (DST): UTC+4:30 (IRDT)

Ainehvand-e Darreh Rashteh (Persian: اينه وندداره رشته, also Romanized as Aīnehvand-e Dārreh Rashteh) is a village in Jeygaran Rural District, Ozgoleh District, Salas-e Babajani County, Kermanshah Province, Iran. At the 2006 census, its population was 79, in 15 families.
