= Shahgodar-e Mohammad =

Shahgodar-e Mohammad شاه گدارمحمد
- Village
- Location within Iran
- Coordinates: 34°40′52″N 46°15′19″E
- Country: Iran
- Province: Kermanshah
- County: Salas-e Babajani
- Bakhsh: Central
- Rural District: Zamkan

Population (2006)
  - Total: 202
- Time zone: UTC+3:30 (IRST)
  - Summer (DST): UTC+4:30 (IRDT)

Shahgodar-e Mohammad (Persian: شاه گدارمحمد, also Romanized as Shāhgodār-e Moḩammad; also known as Banāvech and Shāh Gozār) is a village in Zamkan Rural District, in the Central District of Salas-e Babajani County, Kermanshah Province, Iran. At the 2006 census, its population was 202, in 36 families.
