= Deh Huleh =

Deh Huleh (Persian: ده هوله), also known as Huleh, may refer to:

- Deh Huleh-ye Olya
- Deh Huleh-ye Sofla
