= Zamkan-e Olya =

Zamkan-e Olya زمكان عليا
- Village
- Location within Iran
- Coordinates: 34°37′18″N 46°18′08″E
- Country: Iran
- Province: Kermanshah
- County: Salas-e Babajani
- Bakhsh: Zamkan
- Rural District: Zamkan

Population (2006)
  - Total: 561
- Time zone: UTC+3:30 (IRST)
  - Summer (DST): UTC+4:30 (IRDT)

Zamkan-e Olya (Persian: زمكان عليا, also Romanized as Zamkān-e ‘Olyā; also known as Zamkānī) is a village in Zamkan Rural District, in the Zamkan District of Salas-e Babajani County, Kermanshah Province, Iran. At the 2006 census, its population was 561, in 103 families.
