= Cham Zereshk-e Olya =

Village in Kermanshah province, Iran

Cham Zereshk-e Olya Persian: چم زرشك عليا
- Village
- Location within Iran
- Coordinates: 34°39′59″N 46°07′28″E
- Country: Iran
- Province: Kermanshah
- County: Salas-e Babajani
- District: Central
- Rural District: Dasht-e Hor

Population (2016)
  - Total: 988
- Time zone: UTC+3:30 (IRST)

Cham Zereshk-e Olya (Persian: چم زرشك عليا) (Note: Also romanized as Cham Zereshk-e ‘Olyā) is a village in Dasht-e Hor Rural District of the Central District of Salas-e Babajani County, Kermanshah province, Iran.

== Demographics ==
=== Population ===
At the time of the 2006 National Census, the village's population was 815 in 148 households. The following census in 2011 counted 1,182 people in 238 households. The 2016 census measured the population of the village as 988 people in 251 households. It was the most populous village in its rural district.
