= Kezi =

Kezi may refer to:

- Kezi, Iran
- Kezi, Zimbabwe

== See also ==
- KEZI, a television station in Eugene, Oregon, USA
