= Tazehabad =

City in Kermanshah province, Iran

Tazehabad Persian: تازه‌آباد
- City
- Location within Iran
- Coordinates: 34°44′16″N 46°09′15″E
- Country: Iran
- Province: Kermanshah
- County: Salas-e Babajani
- District: Central

Population (2016)
  - Total: 14,701
- Time zone: UTC+3:30 (IRST)

Tazehabad (Persian: تازه‌آباد) (Note: Also romanized as Tāzehābād) is a city in the Central District of Salas-e Babajani County, Kermanshah province, Iran, serving as capital of both the county and the district.

== Demographics ==
=== Language ===
The spoken language in the city is Kurdish, but the language which is used in schools and offices is Persian, as the official language of Iran in which almost everyone in the city is fluent.

=== Population ===
At the time of the 2006 National Census, the city's population was 7,479 in 1,661 households. The following census in 2011 counted 12,080 people in 2,998 households. The 2016 census measured the population of the city as 14,701 people in 4,039 households.
