= Ezgeleh =

City in Kermanshah province, Iran

Ezgeleh Persian: ازگله
- City
- Location within Iran
- Coordinates: 34°49′54″N 45°50′33″E
- Country: Iran
- Province: Kermanshah
- County: Salas-e Babajani
- District: Ezgeleh

Population (2016)
  - Total: 1,502
- Time zone: UTC+3:30 (IRST)

Ezgeleh (Persian: ازگله) (Note: Also romanized as Azgaleh; also known as Asgaleh, Askīleh, Asqaīla, Asqaīleh, Azgaleh-ye Sheykh Najm od Dīn, and Azgiła (Kurdish: ئەزگڵە)) is a city in, and the capital of, Ezgeleh District of Salas-e Babajani County, Kermanshah province, Iran. It also serves as the administrative center for Ezgeleh Rural District.

== Demographics ==
=== Population ===
At the time of the 2006 National Census, the city's population was 939 in 198 households. The following census in 2011 counted 1,256 people in 291 households. The 2016 census measured the population of the city as 1,502 people in 372 households.
