= Ali Aqai Hezarkhani =

Ali Aqai Hezarkhani علي اقاي هزارخاني
- Village
- Location within Iran
- Coordinates: 34°41′54″N 46°24′08″E
- Country: Iran
- Province: Kermanshah
- County: Javanrud
- Bakhsh: Central
- Rural District: Bazan

Population (2006)
  - Total: 62
- Time zone: UTC+3:30 (IRST)
  - Summer (DST): UTC+4:30 (IRDT)

Ali Aqai Hezarkhani (Persian: علي اقاي هزارخاني, Sorani Kurdish: عەلی ئاقای ھەزارخانی, also Romanized as ‘Alī Āqā'ī Hezārkhānī; also known as ‘Alī Āqā'ī) is a village in Bazan Rural District, in the Central District of Javanrud County, Kermanshah Province, Iran. At the 2006 census, its population was 62, in 14 families.
