= Cham Zereshk =

Cham Zereshk چم زرشك
- Village
- Location within Iran
- Coordinates: 33°43′27″N 47°13′28″E
- Country: Iran
- Province: Lorestan
- County: Kuhdasht
- Bakhsh: Darb-e Gonbad
- Rural District: Darb-e Gonbad

Population (2006)
  - Total: 135
- Time zone: UTC+3:30 (IRST)
  - Summer (DST): UTC+4:30 (IRDT)

Cham Zereshk (Persian: چم زرشك) is a village in Darb-e Gonbad Rural District, Darb-e Gonbad District, Kuhdasht County, Lorestan Province, Iran. At the 2006 census, its population was 135, in 21 families.
