= Sehtapan, Kurdistan =

Village in Kurdistan, Iran

Sehtapan سه تپان
- Village
- Location within Iran
- Coordinates: 36°06′55″N 46°50′58″E
- Country: Iran
- Province: Kurdistan
- County: Divandarreh
- Bakhsh: Karaftu
- Rural District: Zarrineh

Population (2006)
  - Total: 147
- Time zone: UTC+3:30 (IRST)
  - Summer (DST): UTC+4:30 (IRDT)

Sehtapan (Persian: سه تپان, also Romanized as Sehtapān; also known as Seh Tappeh) is a village in Zarrineh Rural District, Karaftu District, Divandarreh County, Kurdistan Province, Iran. At the 2006 census, its population was 147, in 34 families. The village is populated by Kurds.
