= Kugah, Gilan =

Kugah كوگاه
- Village
- Location within Iran
- Coordinates: 37°03′39″N 50°21′06″E
- Country: Iran
- Province: Gilan
- County: Rudsar
- Bakhsh: Kelachay
- Rural District: Machian

Population (2006)
  - Total: 156
- Time zone: UTC+3:30 (IRST)
  - Summer (DST): UTC+4:30 (IRDT)

Kugah (Persian: كوگاه, also Romanized as Kūgāh) is a village in Machian Rural District, Kelachay District, Rudsar County, Gilan Province, Iran. At the 2006 census, its population was 156, in 43 families.
