= Meleh Kabud-e Olya =

Meleh Kabud-e Olya مله كبودعليا
- Village
- Location within Iran
- Coordinates: 34°18′06″N 47°47′28″E
- Country: Iran
- Province: Lorestan
- County: Delfan
- Bakhsh: Kakavand
- Rural District: Kakavand-e Sharqi

Population (2006)
  - Total: 212
- Time zone: UTC+3:30 (IRST)
  - Summer (DST): UTC+4:30 (IRDT)

Meleh Kabud-e Olya (Persian: مله كبودعليا, also Romanized as Meleh Kabūd-e ‘Olyā; also known as Maleh Kabood, Maleh Kabūd, and Mullah Kabūd) is a village in Kakavand-e Sharqi Rural District, Kakavand District, Delfan County, Lorestan Province, Iran. At the 2006 census, its population was 212, in 48 families.
