= Meleh Kabud, Dalahu =

Village in Kermanshah, Iran

Meleh Kabud مله كبود
- Village
- Location within Iran
- Coordinates: 34°24′56″N 46°29′28″E
- Country: Iran
- Province: Kermanshah
- County: Dalahu
- Bakhsh: Gahvareh
- Rural District: Gurani

Population (2006)
  - Total: 103
- Time zone: UTC+3:30 (IRST)
  - Summer (DST): UTC+4:30 (IRDT)

Meleh Kabud (Persian: مله كبود, also Romanized as Meleh Kabūd) is a village in Gurani Rural District, Gahvareh District, Dalahu County, Kermanshah Province, Iran. At the 2006 census, its population was 103, in 21 families.
