= Sheykh Saleh, Shush =

Sheykh Saleh شيخ صالح
- Village
- Location within Iran
- Coordinates: 32°02′00″N 48°30′00″E
- Country: Iran
- Province: Khuzestan
- County: Shush
- Bakhsh: Shavur
- Rural District: Seyyed Abbas

Population (2006)
  - Total: 343
- Time zone: UTC+3:30 (IRST)
  - Summer (DST): UTC+4:30 (IRDT)

Sheykh Saleh (Persian: شيخ صالح, also Romanized as Sheykh Şāleḩ; also known as Sheykh Şāleḩ Sā‘īd) is a village in Seyyed Abbas Rural District, Shavur District, Shush County, Khuzestan Province, Iran. At the 2006 census, its population was 343, in 44 families.
