= Choqa Maran (34°29′ N 47°00′ E), Kermanshah =

Choqa Maran چقاماران
- Village
- Location within Iran
- Coordinates: 34°29′18″N 47°00′02″E
- Country: Iran
- Province: Kermanshah
- County: Kermanshah
- Bakhsh: Central
- Rural District: Miyan Darband

Population (2006)
  - Total: 349
- Time zone: UTC+3:30 (IRST)
  - Summer (DST): UTC+4:30 (IRDT)

Choqa Maran (Persian: چقاماران, also Romanized as Choqā Mārān) is a village in Miyan Darband Rural District, in the Central District of Kermanshah County, Kermanshah Province, Iran. At the 2006 census, its population was 349, in 77 families.
