= Meleh Kabud, Sarpol-e Zahab =

Meleh Kabud مله كبود
- Village
- Location within Iran
- Coordinates: 34°31′50″N 45°53′39″E
- Country: Iran
- Province: Kermanshah
- County: Sarpol-e Zahab
- Bakhsh: Central
- Rural District: Howmeh-ye Sarpol

Population (2006)
  - Total: 81
- Time zone: UTC+3:30 (IRST)
  - Summer (DST): UTC+4:30 (IRDT)

Meleh Kabud (Persian: مله كبود, also Romanized as Meleh Kabūd; also known as Mollā Kabū and Mollā Kabūd) is a village in Howmeh-ye Sarpol Rural District, in the Central District of Sarpol-e Zahab County, Kermanshah Province, Iran. At the 2006 census, its population was 81, in 14 families.
