= Meleh Kabud-e Sofla =

Village in Lorestan, Iran

Meleh Kabud-e Sofla مله كبود سفلي
- Village
- Location within Iran
- Coordinates: 34°18′01″N 47°47′04″E
- Country: Iran
- Province: Lorestan
- County: Delfan
- Bakhsh: Kakavand
- Rural District: Kakavand-e Sharqi

Population (2006)
  - Total: 45
- Time zone: UTC+3:30 (IRST)
  - Summer (DST): UTC+4:30 (IRDT)

Meleh Kabud-e Sofla (Persian: مله كبود سفلي, also Romanized as Meleh Kabūd-e Soflá) is a village in Kakavand-e Sharqi Rural District, Kakavand District, Delfan County, Lorestan Province, Iran. In accordance with the 2006 census, its population was 45, in 11 families.
