= Chahar Divar, West Azerbaijan =

Chahar Divar چهارديوار
- Village
- Location within Iran
- Coordinates: 36°29′17″N 45°56′27″E
- Country: Iran
- Province: West Azerbaijan
- County: Bukan
- Bakhsh: Central
- Rural District: Il Teymur

Population (2006)
  - Total: 170
- Time zone: UTC+3:30 (IRST)
  - Summer (DST): UTC+4:30 (IRDT)

Chahar Divar (Persian: چهارديوار, also Romanized as Chahār Dīvār) is a village in Il Teymur Rural District, in the Central District of Bukan County, West Azerbaijan Province, Iran. At the 2006 census, its population was 170, in 31 families.
