= Zamkan District =

District in Kermanshah province, Iran

Zamkan District Persian: بخش زمکان
- District
- Location within Iran
- Coordinates: 34°45′20″N 46°13′46″E
- Country: Iran
- Province: Kermanshah
- County: Salas-e Babajani
- Capital: Mirabad
- Time zone: UTC+3:30 (IRST)

Zamkan District (Persian: بخش زمکان) is in Salas-e Babajani County, Kermanshah province, Iran. Its capital is the village of Mirabad, whose population at the time of the 2016 National Census was 966 people in 260 households.

== History ==
In 2019, Zamkan Rural District (Note: Renamed Zamkan-e Jonubi Rural District) was separated from the Central District in the formation of Zamkan District, which was divided into two rural districts, including the new Zamkan-e Shomali Rural District.

Zamkan District
Administrative Divisions
Zamkan-e Jonubi RD (Note: Formerly Zamkan Rural District)
Zamkan-e Shomali RD
RD = Rural District
