= Shah Godar-e Sofla =

Shah Godar-e Sofla شاه گدارسفلي
- Village
- Location within Iran
- Coordinates: 35°41′37″N 48°07′40″E
- Country: Iran
- Province: Kurdistan
- County: Bijar
- Bakhsh: Chang Almas
- Rural District: Pir Taj

Population (2006)
  - Total: 116
- Time zone: UTC+3:30 (IRST)
  - Summer (DST): UTC+4:30 (IRDT)

Shah Godar-e Sofla (Persian: شاه گدارسفلي, also Romanized as Shāh Godār-e Soflá; also known as Shāh Godār, Shah Gozar, and Shāh Gudār) is a village in Pir Taj Rural District, Chang Almas District, Bijar County, Kurdistan Province, Iran. At the 2006 census, its population was 116, in 26 families. The village is populated by Azerbaijanis.
