= Dasht-e Hor Rural District =

Rural district in Kermanshah province, Iran

Dasht-e Hor Rural District Persian: دهستان دشت حر
- Rural District
- Location within Iran
- Coordinates: 34°41′56″N 46°08′16″E
- Country: Iran
- Province: Kermanshah
- County: Salas-e Babajani
- District: Central
- Capital: Qolqoleh

Population (2016)
  - Total: 5,434
- Time zone: UTC+3:30 (IRST)

Dasht-e Hor Rural District (Persian: دهستان دشت حر) is in the Central District of Salas-e Babajani County, Kermanshah province, Iran. Its capital is the village of Qolqoleh.

== Demographics ==
=== Population ===
At the time of the 2006 National Census, the rural district's population was 7,831 in 1,575 households. There were 6,806 inhabitants in 1,444 households at the following census of 2011. The 2016 census measured the population of the rural district as 5,434 in 1,379 households. The most populous of its 51 villages was Cham Zereshk-e Olya, with 988 people.
