= Ezgeleh Rural District =

Rural district in Kermanshah province, Iran

Ezgeleh Rural District Persian: دهستان ازگله
- Rural District
- Location within Iran
- Coordinates: 34°48′21″N 45°52′18″E
- Country: Iran
- Province: Kermanshah
- County: Salas-e Babajani
- District: Ezgeleh
- Capital: Ezgeleh

Population (2016)
  - Total: 1,809
- Time zone: UTC+3:30 (IRST)

Ezgeleh Rural District (Persian: دهستان ازگله) is in Ezgeleh District of Salas-e Babajani County, Kermanshah province, Iran. It is administered from the city of Ezgeleh.

== Demographics ==
=== Population ===
At the time of the 2006 National Census, the rural district's population was 2,710 in 541 households. There were 1,943 inhabitants in 420 households in the following census of 2011. The 2016 census measured the population of the rural district as 1,809 in 421 households. The most populous of its 56 villages was Darreh Zhaleh-ye Sofla, with 196 people.
