= Zamkan-e Jonubi Rural District =

Rural district in Kermanshah province, Iran

Zamkan-e Jonubi Rural District Persian: دهستان زمکان جنوبی
- Rural District
- Location within Iran
- Coordinates: 34°40′37″N 46°18′05″E
- Country: Iran
- Province: Kermanshah
- County: Salas-e Babajani
- District: Zamkan
- Capital: Mirabad

Population (2016)
  - Total: 5,070
- Time zone: UTC+3:30 (IRST)

Zamkan-e Jonubi Rural District (Persian: دهستان زمکان جنوبی) (Note: Formerly Zamkan Rural District) is in Zamkan District of Salas-e Babajani County, Kermanshah province, Iran. Its capital is the village of Mirabad.

== Demographics ==
=== Population ===
At the time of the 2006 National Census, the rural district's population (as Zamkan Rural District of the Central District) was 6,998 in 1,495 households. There were 6,213 inhabitants in 1,466 households at the following census of 2011. The 2016 census measured the population of the rural district as 5,070 in 1,301 households. The most populous of its 40 villages was Mirabad, with 966 people.

In 2019, the rural district was separated from the district in the formation of Zamkan District and renamed Zamkan-e Jonubi Rural District.
