= Khaneh Shur Rural District =

Rural district in Kermanshah province, Iran

Khaneh Shur Rural District Persian: دهستان خانه شور
- Rural District
- Location within Iran
- Coordinates: 34°51′41″N 45°59′20″E
- Country: Iran
- Province: Kermanshah
- County: Salas-e Babajani
- District: Central
- Capital: Negareh

Population (2016)
  - Total: 6,556
- Time zone: UTC+3:30 (IRST)

Khaneh Shur Rural District (Persian: دهستان خانه شور) is in the Central District of Salas-e Babajani County, Kermanshah province, Iran. Its capital is the village of Negareh. The previous capital of the rural district was the village of Deh-e Sheykh.

== Demographics ==
=== Population ===
At the time of the 2006 National Census, the rural district's population was 7,623 in 1,615 households. There were 6,253 inhabitants in 1,479 households at the following census of 2011. The 2016 census measured the population of the rural district as 6,556 in 1,729 households. The most populous of its 55 villages was Sheykh Salleh, with 1,425 people.
