= Ezgeleh District =

District in Kermanshah province, Iran

Ezgeleh District Persian: بخش ازگله
- District
- Location within Iran
- Coordinates: 34°48′21″N 45°52′18″E
- Country: Iran
- Province: Kermanshah
- County: Salas-e Babajani
- Capital: Ezgeleh

Population (2016)
  - Total: 3,311
- Time zone: UTC+3:30 (IRST)

Ezgeleh District (Persian: بخش ازگله) is in Salas-e Babajani County, Kermanshah province, Iran. Its capital is the city of Ezgeleh.

== History ==
After the 2011 National Census, Jeygaran and Sarqaleh Rural Districts were separated from the district to join Sarpol-e Zahab County.

== Demographics ==
=== Population ===
At the time of the 2006 census, the district's population was 7,125 in 1,388 households. The following census in 2011 counted 7,032 people in 1,455 households. The 2016 census measured the population of the district as 3,311 inhabitants in 793 households.

=== Administrative divisions ===
Ezgeleh District Population
Administrative Divisions	2006	2011	2016
Jeygaran RD (Note: Transferred to Sarpol-e Zahab County)	2,867	3,202	
Ezgeleh RD	2,710	1,943	1,809
Sarqaleh RD	609	631	
Ezgeleh (city)	939	1,256	1,502
Total	7,125	7,032	3,311
RD = Rural District
