= Central District (Salas-e Babajani County) =

District in Kermanshah province, Iran

Central District (Salas-e Babajani County) Persian: بخش مرکزی شهرستان ثلاث باباجانی
- District
- Location within Iran
- Coordinates: 34°49′02″N 46°03′04″E
- Country: Iran
- Province: Kermanshah
- County: Salas-e Babajani
- Capital: Tazehabad

Population (2016)
  - Total: 31,761
- Time zone: UTC+3:30 (IRST)

The Central District of Salas-e Babajani County (Persian: بخش مرکزی شهرستان ثلاث باباجانی) is in Kermanshah province, Iran. Its capital is the city of Tazehabad.

== History ==
After the 2016 National Census, Zamkan Rural District (Note: Renamed Zamkan-e Jonubi Rural District) was separated from the district in the establishment of Zamkan District.

== Demographics ==
=== Population ===
At the time of the 2006 census, the district's population was 29,931 in 6,346 households. The following census in 2011 counted 31,352 people in 7,387 households. The 2016 census measured the population of the district as 31,761 inhabitants in 8,448 households.

=== Administrative divisions ===
Central District (Salas-e Babajani County) Population
Administrative Divisions	2006	2011	2016
Dasht-e Hor RD	7,831	6,806	5,434
Khaneh Shur RD	7,623	6,253	6,556
Zamkan RD (Note: Transferred to Zamkan District after the 2016 census and renamed Zamkan-e Jonubi Rural District)	6,998	6,213	5,070
Tazehabad (city)	7,479	12,080	14,701
Total	29,931	31,352	31,761
RD = Rural District
