= Salas-e Babajani County =

County in Kermanshah province, Iran

Salas-e Babajani County Persian: شهرستان ثلاث باباجانی
- County
- Location of Salas-e Babajani County in Kermanshah province (top left, green)

- Location of Kermanshah province in Iran
- Coordinates: 34°49′N 46°02′E
- Country: Iran
- Province: Kermanshah
- Capital: Tazehabad
- Districts: Central, Ezgeleh, Zamkan

Population (2016)
  - Total: 35,219
- Time zone: UTC+3:30 (IRST)

Salas-e Babajani County (Persian: شهرستان ثلاث باباجانی) (Note: Also known as Salasi Bawajani County (Kurdish: شارستانی سەلاسی باوەجانی)) is in Kermanshah province, Iran. Its capital is the city of Tazehabad.

== History ==
=== Ancient history ===
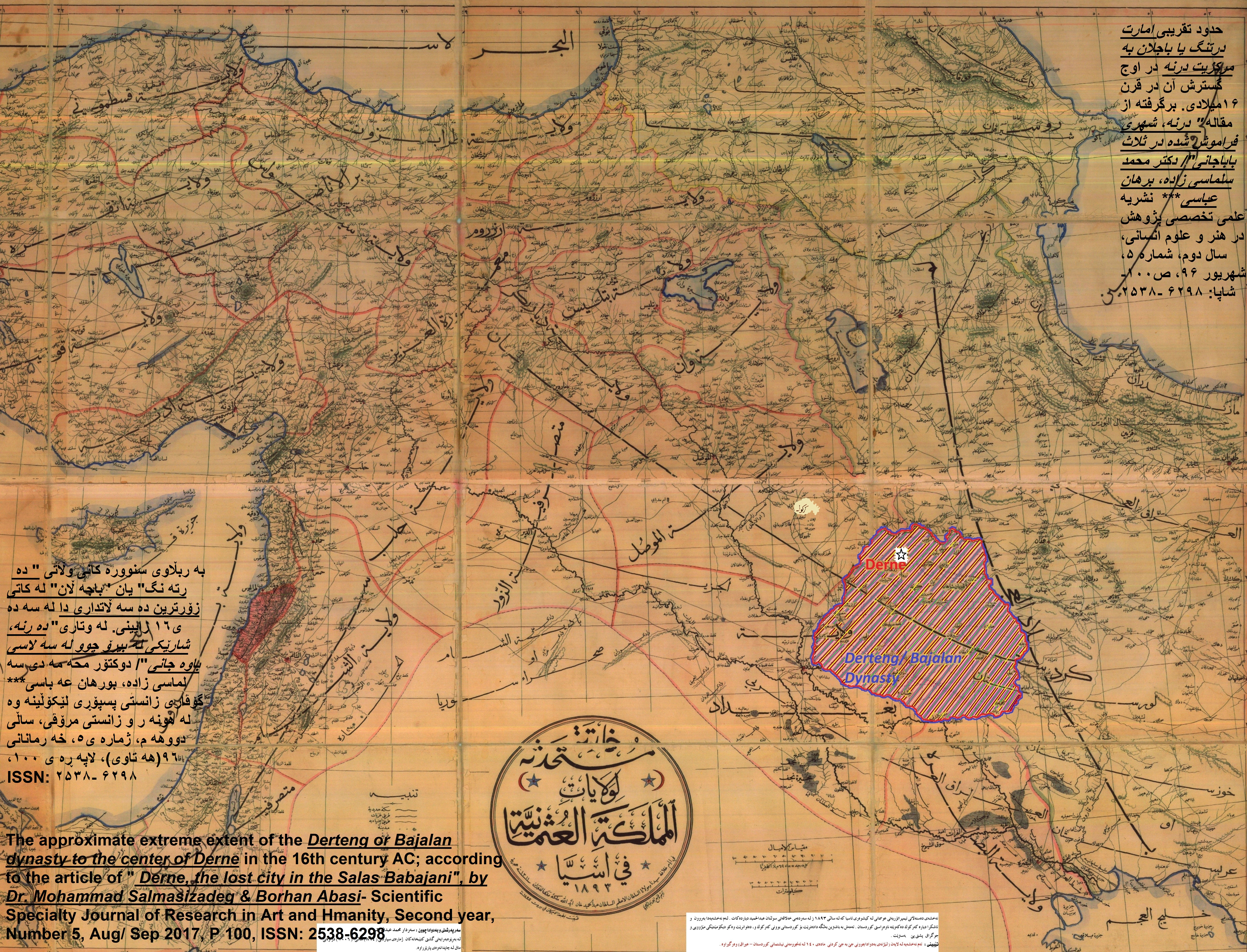
فارسی: The approximate extreme extent of the Derteng or Bajalan dynasty to the center of Derne in the 16th century AC; according to the article of ” Derne, the lost city in the Salas Babajani”, by Dr. Mohammad Salmasizadeg & Borhan Abasi- Scientific Specialty Journal of Research in Art and Humanity, Second year, No. 5, Aug/Sep 2017, P 100, ISSN: 2538-6298

Darneh/Derne is one of the historical places in Salas-e Babajani County which mentioned by Herodotus (5th century BC) and Ptolemy (1st century AD). For decades Darneh/ Derne has been capital of Derteng, Hulwan and Bajalan dynasties, but now is a small village in Doli Dere Region in Central District of Salas-e Babajani County.

=== Administrative history ===
After the 2011 National Census, Jeygaran and Sarqaleh Rural Districts were separated from Ezgeleh District to join Sarpol-e Zahab County.

In 2019, Zamkan Rural District (Note: Renamed Zamkan-e Jonubi Rural District) was separated from the Central District in the establishment of Zamkan District, including the new Zamkan-e Shomali Rural District.

=== 12 Nov 2017 earthquake ===
On 12 November 2017 at 18:18 UTC (21:48 Iran Standard Time, 21:18 Arabia Standard Time), an earthquake with a moment magnitude of 7.3 occurred on the Iran–Iraq border, just inside Iran, in Ezgeleh, Salas-e Babajani County, with an epicentre approximately 30 kilometres (19 mi) south of the city of Halabja, Kurdistan Region.

== Demographics ==
=== Population ===
At the time of the 2006 census, the county's population was 37,056 in 7,734 households. The following census in 2011 counted 38,475 people in 8,830 households. The 2016 census measured the population of the county as 35,219 in 9,270 households.

=== Administrative divisions ===
Salas-e Babajani County's population history and administrative structure over three consecutive censuses are shown in the following table.

Salas-e Babajani County Population
| Administrative Divisions | 2006 | 2011 | 2016 |
|---|---|---|---|
| Central District | 29,931 | 31,352 | 31,761 |
| Dasht-e Hor RD | 7,831 | 6,806 | 5,434 |
| Khaneh Shur RD | 7,623 | 6,253 | 6,556 |
| Zamkan RD (Note: Transferred to Zamkan District after the 2016 census) | 6,998 | 6,213 | 5,070 |
| Tazehabad (city) | 7,479 | 12,080 | 14,701 |
| Ezgeleh District | 7,125 | 7,032 | 3,311 |
| Jeygaran RD (Note: Transferred to Sarpol-e Zahab County) | 2,867 | 3,202 | |
| Ezgeleh RD | 2,710 | 1,943 | 1,809 |
| Sarqaleh RD | 609 | 631 | |
| Ezgeleh (city) | 939 | 1,256 | 1,502 |
| Zamkan District (Note: Established after the 2016 census) | | | |
| Zamkan-e Jonubi RD (Note: Formerly Zamkan Rural District) | | | |
| Zamkan-e Shomali RD | | | |
| Total | 37,056 | 38,475 | 35,219 |
RD = Rural District

== Notable people ==
Khana Qubadi (1700–1759), who lived in Derne the capital of Derteng and Bajelan dynasties located in modern day Salas-e Babajani County, translated Quran first time in history to the Kurdish language. Unfortunately, his translation book had been burned by extremists, accordingly he had to be fugitive to the Baban dynasty capital in Shahrizor. Vali Dewane is another poet who lived in Derne. The biography of Vali Dewane has been cames in love like Majnun, even more than him.

Kasra Nouri, a lawyer and Gonabadi dervish imprisoned in Tehran's Revolutionary Court, has been sentenced to two years in exile for Salas-e Babajani.

== See also ==
Media related to Salas-e Babajani County at Wikimedia Commons
