= 2012–13 Khuzestan Premier League =

Khuzestan Premier League
- Season: 2012–13
- Champions: Farhang Ramhormoz
- Matches: 240
- Goals: 619 (2.58 per match)

The 2012–13 Khuzestan Premier League season was the 13th season of the Khuzestan Premier League which took place from October 3, 2012 to May 16, 2013 with 16 teams competing from the province of Khuzestan. Teams played home and away with one another each playing 30 matches. Farhang Ramhormoz finished the season on top of the standings and was promoted to division 3 of the Iranian football system. Meanwhile, Esteghlal Masjedsoleiman, Esteghlal Hamidieh, and Shahin Hendijan were relegated to the Khuzestan Division 1 league.

== Teams ==
Team	Location
Farhang Ramhormoz	Ramhormoz
Esteghlal Mollasani	Mollasani
Jonub Susangerd	Susangerd
Naftun Masjedsoleiman	Masjedsoleiman
Shalamche Novin Khoramshahr	Khoramshahr
Persepolis Veys	Veys
Esteghlal Ramhormoz	Ramhormoz
Esteghlal Shushtar	Shushtar
Shahin Mahshahr	Mahshahr
Anzan Izeh	Izeh
Sepahan Izeh	Izeh
Milad Dezful	Dezful
Sheiban Bavi	Bavi
Esteghlal Masjedsoleiman	Masjedsoleiman
Esteghlal Hamidieh	Hamidieh
Shahin Hendijan	Hendijan

== Final standings ==
Pos	Team	Pld	W	D	L	GF	GA	GD	Pts	Qualification or relegation
1	Farhang Ramhormoz	30	18	8	4	51	22	+29	62	Promotion to Division 3
2	Esteghlal Mollasani	30	19	4	7	54	30	+24	61	
3	Jonub Susangerd	30	15	6	9	40	29	+11	51	
4	Naftun Masjedsoleiman	30	15	5	10	45	34	+11	50	
5	Shalamche Novin Khoramshahr	30	13	9	8	39	33	+6	48	
6	Persepolis Veys	29	13	7	9	33	36	−3	46	
7	Esteghlal Ramhormoz	30	11	9	10	43	34	+9	42	
8	Esteghlal Shushtar	30	12	6	12	44	47	−3	42	
9	Shahin Mahshahr	30	10	10	10	33	31	+2	40	
10	Anzan Izeh	30	11	6	13	37	34	+3	39	
11	Sepahan Izeh	30	8	13	9	28	26	+2	37	
12	Milad Dezful	30	10	5	15	44	45	−1	35	
13	Sheiban Bavi	30	10	3	17	40	52	−12	33	
14	Esteghlal Masjedsoleiman	30	8	3	19	30	61	−31	27	Relegation to Khuzestan Division 1
15	Esteghlal Hamidieh	30	6	8	16	27	52	−25	26	Relegation to Khuzestan Division 1
16	Shahin Hendijan	30	5	9	16	31	54	−23	24	Relegation to Khuzestan Division 1

Updated to match(es) played on 17 March 2017. Source: 2012-13 Khuzestan Premier League Table
Rules for classification: 1) Points; 2) Goal difference; 3) Goals scored.

== See also ==
- 2012–13 Azadegan League
- 2013–14 League 2
- 2013–14 League 3
- 2012–13 Hazfi Cup
- 2013 Iranian Super Cup
