= 2018–19 Khuzestan Premier League =

Khuzestan Premier League
- Season: 2018–19
- Champions: Eftekhar Shushtar
- Matches played: 210
- Goals scored: 568 (2.7 per match)
- Biggest home win: 7-0 (January 11, 2019)
- Biggest away win: 3-0 (April 26, 2019)

The 2018–19 Khuzestan Premier League season was the 19th season of the Khuzestan Premier League which took place from September 7, 2018, to April 26, 2019, with 16 teams competing from the province of Khuzestan. This was the second year that the league played with 16 teams. Teams played home and away with one another each playing 28 matches. Eftekhar Shushtar finished the season on top of the standings and was promoted to division 3 of the Iranian football system. Meanwhile, with Esteghlal Veys' withdrawal from the league, they will be relegated to the Khuzestan Division 1 along with last place finishers Esteghlal Abadan.

== League changes ==
During week 4 of the season, Esteghlal Veys did not take the field against Jonub Susangerd due to monetary issues. The team officially withdrew from the league prior to the start of week 5 matches. The league continued with the remaining 15 teams and Esteghlal's results were removed from league records. Week 30 was scheduled to take place prior to the New Year, however, due to bad weather conditions, the league cancelled 4 matches while playing only those matches that would alter the league champion and the team being relegated.

== Teams ==
Team	Location	Stadium	Capacity
Eftekhar Shushtar	Shushtar	Takhti Shushtar Arena	10,000
Etehad Safi Abad Dezful	Dezful	Majidian Dezful Arena	5,000
Parsa Bagh-e malek	Bagh-e Malek	Bagh-e Malek Martyrs Arena	5,000
Jonub Susangerd	Susangerd	Takhti Susangerd Arena	10,000
Farhang Ramhormoz	Ramhormoz	Takhti Ramhormoz Arena	10,000
Abi Pooshan Hamidieh	Hamidie	Takhti Hamidieh Arena	10,000
Jonub Sheiban	Mollasani	Molasani Martyrs Arena	5,000
Esteghlal Zeydun	Zeydun	Zeydun Martyrs Arena	5,000
Bahmaei Ramhormoz	Ramhormoz	Takhti Ramhormoz Arena	10,000
Anzan Izeh	Izeh	Takhti Izeh Arena	10,000
Iranmehr Khoramshahr	Khoramshahr	Jahan Ara Khoramshahr Arena	5,000
Persepolis Shush	Shush	Takhti Shush Arena	5,000
Persepolis Veys	Veys	Veys Martyrs Arena	5,000
Shahrdari Bandar-e Emam	Bandar-e Emam	Takhti Bandar-e Emam Arena	10,000
Esteghlal Abadan	Abadan	Shahrdari Abadan Arena	5,000
Esteghlal Veys	Ahvaz	Navard & Luleh Ahvaz Arena	1,000

== Final standings ==
Pos	Team	Pld	W	D	L	GF	GA	GD	Pts	Qualification or relegation
1	Eftekhar Shushtar	28	16	6	6	49	32	+17	54	Promotion to Division 3
2	Etehad Safi Abad Dezful	28	14	10	4	42	27	+15	52	
3	Parsa Bagh-e malek	28	14	8	6	44	25	+19	50	
4	Jonub Susangerd	28	14	6	8	53	43	+10	48	
5	Farhang Ramhormoz	28	10	10	8	35	30	+5	40	
6	Abi Pooshan Hamidieh	28	11	7	10	42	39	+3	40	
7	Jonub Sheiban	28	11	6	11	35	35	0	39	
8	Esteghlal Zeydun	28	9	10	9	38	32	+6	37	
9	Bahmaei Ramhormoz	28	11	4	13	39	46	−7	37	
10	Anzan Izeh	28	9	7	12	29	30	−1	34	
11	Iranmehr Khoramshahr	28	8	9	11	25	33	−8	33	
12	Persepolis Shush	28	8	8	12	43	48	−5	32	
13	Persepolis Veys	28	7	11	10	33	41	−8	32	
14	Shahrdari Bandar-e Emam	28	7	6	15	29	45	−16	27	
15	Esteghlal Abadan	28	4	6	18	32	62	−30	18	Relegation to Khuzestan Division 1
16	Esteghlal Veys	0	0	0	0	0	0	0	0	Relegation to Khuzestan Division 1

Updated to match(es) played on 17 March 2017. Source: 2017-18 Khuzestan Premier League Table
Rules for classification: 1) Points; 2) Goal difference; 3) Goals scored.

== Results ==
Home \ Away	ANI	APH	BAR	EFS	ESA	ESD	ESV	ESZ	FAR	IMK	JON	JOS	PBM	PPS	PPV	SBE
Anzan Izeh		2–0	1–1	0–1	4–0	1–1		2–1	1–0	0–0	1–2	3–0	0–2	2–2	2–1	1–0
Abi Pooshan Hamidieh	3–0		1–0	1–1	2–1	0–0		3–2	2–0	5–1	1–2	0–0	0–1	3–3	4–1	2–0
Bahmaei Ramhormoz	2–3	1–0		5–2	2–1	2–3		2–1	1–0	1–1	3–1	0–1	1–0	4–3	1–1	3–1
Eftekhar Shushtar	3–1	2–2	2–0		3–1	2–0		1–3	2–1	3–1	2–0	1–0	2–1	1–1	7–0	1–0
Esteghlal Abadan	0–0	1–2	1–0	1–2		5–2		0–3	1–1	1–2	2–1	3–6	1–4	4–2	0–3	1–2
Etehad Safi Abad Dezful	1–1	1–0	3–1	3–0	1–0			0–0	2–0	0–1	5–2	0–0	1–0	1–0	2–2	2–1
Esteghlal Veys																
Esteghlal Zeydun	2–1	1–1	1–1	1–1	0–0	0–0			1–1	1–0	0–1	2–4	0–0	2–1	1–1	1–2
Farhang Ramhormoz	1–0	4–1	3–0	1–1	3–1	1–1		1–0		1–1	0–0	4–3	0–0	1–0	0–0	1–1
Iranmehr Khoramshahr	1–0	1–2	1–0	2–1	1–1	1–2		0–1	0–2		0–2	2–2	0–1	3–1	1–1	2–0
Jonub Sheiban	1–0	5–2	0–1	0–1	2–1	1–2		3–2	0–1	0–0		2–2	1–2	2–0	1–1	2–2
Jonub Susangerd	2–1	1–0	3–0	3–1	4–4	2–4		1–4	2–1	2–1	0–1		2–0	3–2	3–1	1–0
Parsa Bagh-e malek	1–0	1–1	4–3	2–2	3–0	3–1		0–1	4–1	1–1	0–1	3–1		1–1	2–0	3–0
Persepolis Shush	0–1	2–1	3–1	1–2	5–0	0–3		2–1	1–3	0–0	3–2	2–2	1–1		2–1	3–2
Persepolis Veys	1–1	2–3	3–0	1–0	2–1	0–0		1–1	1–1	0–1	1–0	1–0	2–2	1–2		4–0
Shahrdari Bandar-e Emam	1–0	3–0	2–3	0–2	0–0	1–1		2–5	3–2	2–0	0–0	0–3	1–2	0–0	3–0	

Updated to match(es) played on 15 July 2019. Source: Khuzestansport Stats
Legend: Blue = home team win; Yellow = draw; Red = away team win.

== See also ==
- 2018–19 Azadegan League
- 2018–19 League 2
- 2018–19 League 3
- 2018–19 Hazfi Cup
- 2019 Iranian Super Cup
