= Shahrak-e Taleqani =

Shahrak-e Taleqani (Persian: شهرك طالقاني) may refer to several places in Iran:

- Shahrak-e Taleqani, Alborz, a village in Karaj County, Alborz province
- Shahrak-e Taleqani, Fars, a village in Marvdasht County, Fars province
- Shahrak-e Taleqani, Andika, a village in Andika County, Khuzestan province
- Shahrak-e Taleqani, Bavi, a village in Bavi County, Khuzestan province
- Shahrak-e Taleqani, Behbahan, a neighborhood in the city of Tashan, Behbahan County, Khuzestan province
- Shahrak-e Taleqani, Izeh, a village in Izeh County, Khuzestan province
- Shahrak-e Taleqani, Mahshahr, a village in Bandar Mahshahr County, Khuzestan province
