= 2014–15 Khuzestan Premier League =

Khuzestan Premier League
- Season: 2014–15
- Champions: Esteghlal Shushtar
- Matches: 182
- Goals: 507 (2.79 per match)
- Biggest home win: 7-0 (March 19, 2015)
- Biggest away win: 5-0 (November 14, 2014)

The 2014–15 Khuzestan Premier League season was the 15th season of the Khuzestan Premier League. It took place from September 28, 2014, to March 19, 2015, with 14 teams competing from the province of Khuzestan. Teams played a home-and-away schedule, with each team competing in 26 matches. Esteghlal Shushtar finished the season at the top of the standings and was promoted to Division 3 of the Iranian football system. Meanwhile, after finishing in last place, Kargar Shadeagan was relegated to the Khuzestan Division 1 league.

== Teams ==
Team	Location	Stadium	Capacity
Esteghlal Shushtar	Shushtar	Takhti Shushtar Arena	10,000
Jonub Susangerd	Susangerd	Takhti Susangerd Arena	10,000
Shardari Shams Abad	Dezful	Safi Abad Dezful Arena	5,000
Persepolis Veys	Veys	Veys Martyrs Arena	5,000
Shahin Mahshahr	Mahshahr	Mahshahr Martyrs Arena	10,000
Esteghlal Ramhormoz	Ramhormoz	Takhti Ramhormoz Arena	10,000
Jonub Bagh-e malek	Bagh-e Malek	Bagh-e Malek Martyrs Arena	5,000
Sepahan Izeh	Izeh	Takhti Izeh Arena	10,000
Esteghlal Ramshir	Ramshir	Takhti Ramshir Arena	10,000
Mahan Susangerd	Susangerd	Takhti Susangerd Arena	10,000
Parsian Bandar-e Emam	Bandar-e Emam Khomeyni	Takhti Bandar-e Emam Arena	10,000
Shahbaz Shadegan	Shadegan	Takhti Shadegan Arena	10,000
Yaran Mahshahr	Mahshahr	Mahshahr Martyrs Arena	10,000
Kargar Shadegan	Shadegan	Takhti Shadegan Arena	10,000

== Final standings ==
Pos	Team	Pld	W	D	L	GF	GA	GD	Pts	Qualification or relegation
1	Esteghlal Shushtar	26	15	6	5	50	30	+20	51	Promotion to Division 3
2	Jonub Susangerd	26	14	8	4	45	23	+22	50	Promotion to Division 3
3	Shardari Shams Abad	26	13	9	4	45	19	+26	48	
4	Persepolis Veys	26	13	5	8	46	27	+19	44	
5	Shahin Mahshahr	26	12	7	7	42	26	+16	43	
6	Esteghlal Ramhormoz	26	9	11	6	37	24	+13	38	
7	Jonub Bagh-e malek	26	11	5	10	49	45	+4	38	
8	Sepahan Izeh	26	9	9	8	31	33	−2	36	
9	Esteghlal Ramshir	26	9	6	11	30	35	−5	33	
10	Mahan Susangerd	26	9	3	14	37	55	−18	30	
11	Parsian Bandar-e Emam	26	6	11	9	35	45	−10	29	
12	Shahbaz Shadegan	26	7	5	14	20	36	−16	26	
13	Yaran Mahshahr	26	5	6	15	25	55	−30	21	
14	Kargar Shadegan	26	2	5	19	15	54	−39	11	Relegation to Khuzestan Division 1

Updated to match(es) played on 17 March 2017. Source: 2014-15 Khuzestan Premier League Table
Rules for classification: 1) Points; 2) Goal difference; 3) Goals scored.

== Results ==
Home \ Away	EOR	ESR	ESS	JMB	JNS	KDS	MNS	PBE	PPV	SDS	SEI	SSA	SSM	YSM
Esteghlal Ramhormoz		2–1	5–1	1–1	1–1	0–0	0–1	2–3	1–1	0–1	1–1	0–0	2–1	6–0
Esteghlal Ramshir	1–2		0–1	1–2	1–0	2–1	3–1	1–0	2–0	2–1	2–2	1–1	1–2	1–0
Esteghlal Shushtar	1–1	6–1		2–1	2–1	6–1	4–1	0–0	3–1	2–0	2–2	2–1	1–2	4–1
Jonub Bagh-e malek	2–4	4–3	1–0		2–2	0–1	5–1	3–0	1–1	4–1	2–1	2–1	3–0	3–3
Jonub Susangerd	0–0	1–1	0–0	5–2		3–0	1–1	0–1	2–1	3–1	2–0	3–0	2–0	3–0
Kargar Shadegan	0–2	0–0	0–1	1–2	1–2		1–2	3–0	0–1	0–1	0–1	0–2	0–2	1–1
Mahan Soosangerd	1–3	1–3	1–2	0–1	2–4	1–0		4–2	0–5	1–0	3–0	0–3	0–0	3–1
Parsian Bandar-e Emam	1–1	0–0	4–4	2–0	2–3	1–1	1–3		0–0	1–1	1–1	2–2	0–5	3–2
Persepolis Veys	1–0	3–0	2–0	3–2	0–1	7–1	4–2	2–2		0–0	2–1	2–1	1–2	2–3
Shahbaz Shadegan	1–2	1–0	1–0	2–1	0–1	0–0	3–2	0–3	0–3		0–2	0–0	0–3	4–0
Sepahan Izeh	1–0	1–1	1–2	4–2	1–1	2–1	3–2	2–2	1–0	0–2		0–0	0–0	3–0
Shardari Shams Abad	1–1	2–1	0–0	2–2	1–0	7–0	2–1	2–0	1–0	3–0	3–0		2–0	3–0
Shahin Mahshahr	2–0	1–0	0–1	3–1	1–1	7–2	4–1	0–2	0–1	1–1	2–0	2–2		1–1
Yaran Mahshahr	0–0	0–1	2–3	1–0	2–3	1–0	1–1	3–2	1–3	1–0	0–1	0–3	1–1	

Updated to match(es) played on 15 July 2019. Source: Khuzestansport Stats
Legend: Blue = home team win; Yellow = draw; Red = away team win.

== See also ==
- 2014–15 Azadegan League
- 2014–15 League 2
- 2014–15 League 3
- 2014–15 Hazfi Cup
- 2014 Iranian Super Cup
