= 2013–14 Khuzestan Premier League =

Khuzestan Premier League
- Season: 2013–14
- Champions: Naftun Masjedsoleiman
- Matches: 181
- Goals: 530 (2.93 per match)

The 2013–14 Khuzestan Premier League season was the 14th season of the Khuzestan Premier League which took place from September 30, 2013 to May 3, 2014 with 14 teams competing from the province of Khuzestan. Teams played home and away with one another each playing 26 matches. Naftun Masjedsoleiman finished the season on top of the standings and was promoted to division 3 of the Iranian football system. Meanwhile, finishing in last place, Sheiban Bavi will be relegated to the Khuzestan Division 1 league.

== Teams ==
Team	Location
Naftun Masjedsoleiman	Masjedsoleiman
Esteghlal Shush	Shush
Parsian Shushtar	Shushtar
Esteghlal Ramhormoz	Ramhormoz
Jonub Susangerd	Susangerd
Persepolis Veys	Veys
Esteghlal Ramshir	Ramshir
Esteghlal Shushtar	Shushtar
Shahin Mahshahr	Mahshahr
Sepahan Izeh	Izeh
Moghavemat Hoveyzeh	Hoveyzeh
Milad Dezful	Dezful
Anzan Izeh	Izeh
Sheiban Bavi	Bavi

== Final standings ==
Pos	Team	Pld	W	D	L	GF	GA	GD	Pts	Qualification or relegation
1	Naftun Masjedsoleiman	25	15	8	2	41	21	+20	53	Promotion to Division 3
2	Esteghlal Shush	26	13	9	4	44	31	+13	48	
3	Parsian Shushtar	26	14	5	7	47	34	+13	47	
4	Esteghlal Ramhormoz	26	14	4	8	43	31	+12	46	
5	Jonub Susangerd	26	13	3	10	38	33	+5	42	
6	Persepolis Veys	26	11	8	7	24	21	+3	41	
7	Esteghlal Ramshir	26	11	7	8	37	26	+11	40	
8	Esteghlal Shushtar	26	12	2	12	51	44	+7	38	
9	Shahin Mahshahr	26	11	4	11	39	45	−6	37	
10	Sepahan Izeh	26	9	9	8	32	27	+5	36	
11	Moghavemat Hoveyzeh	26	8	8	10	43	38	+5	32	
12	Milad Dezful	25	5	7	13	36	47	−11	22	
13	Anzan Izeh	26	4	4	18	34	59	−25	16	
14	Sheiban Bavi	26	0	4	22	21	74	−53	4	Relegation to Khuzestan Division 1

Updated to match(es) played on 17 March 2017. Source: 2013-14 Khuzestan Premier League Table
Rules for classification: 1) Points; 2) Goal difference; 3) Goals scored.

== See also ==
- 2013–14 Azadegan League
- 2013–14 League 2
- 2013–14 League 3
- 2013–14 Hazfi Cup
- 2014 Iranian Super Cup
