= 2019–20 Khuzestan Premier League =

Khuzestan Premier League
- Season: 2019–20

The 2019–20 Khuzestan Premier League season is the 20th season of the Khuzestan Premier League which began on August 25, 2019 with 15 teams competing from the province of Khuzestan. Teams will play home and away with one another each playing 30 matches. The league champion will be promoted to League 3 while the last place team will be relegated to the Khuzestan Division 1 league.

== League changes ==
Since 2 teams were relegated from the 2018-19 season to the Khuzestan Division 1 league, 2 teams were promoted from Division 1 up to the Khuzestan premier league for 2019-20. Parsa Bagh-e Malek did not return this season for unknown reasons. Eftekhar Shushtar was promoted to League 3 after winning the Khuzestan Premier League last year.

== Teams ==
New to the league

Team	Location	Stadium	Capacity
Abi Pooshan Hamidieh	Hamidie	Takhti Hamidieh Arena	10,000
Anzan Izeh	Izeh	Takhti Izeh Arena	10,000
Bahmaei Ramhormoz	Ramhormoz	Takhti Ramhormoz Arena	10,000
Esteghlal Zeydun	Zeydun	Zeydun Martyrs Arena	5,000
Farhang Ramhormoz	Ramhormoz	Takhti Ramhormoz Arena	10,000
Ghods Mahshahr	Mahshahr	Mahshahr Martrys Arena	10,000
Iranmehr Khoramshahr	Khoramshahr	Jahan Ara Khoramshahr Arena	5,000
Jonub Susangerd	Susangerd	Takhti Susangerd Arena	10,000
Navid Daneh Ramhormuz	Ramhormoz	Takhti Ramhormuz Arena	10,000
Pasargad Ramshir	Ramshir	Takhti Ramshir Arena	10,000
Persepolis Shush	Shush	Takhti Shush Arena	5,000
Persepolis Veys	Veys	Veys Martyrs Arena	5,000
Shahrdari Bandar-e Emam	Bandar-e Emam	Takhti Bandar-e Emam Arena	10,000
Shohadaye Dokoohe Andimeshk	Andimeshk	Sarvandi Arena	5,000
Sorkh Abi Seydun	Seydun	Seydun Martyrs Arena	5,000

== Final standings ==
Pos	Team	Pld	W	D	L	GF	GA	GD	Pts	Qualification or relegation
1	Farhang Ramhormoz	22	14	6	2	44	22	+22	48	Promotion to Division 3
2	Shohadaye Dokoohe Andimeshk	23	12	6	5	39	30	+9	42	
3	Bahmaei Ramhormoz	23	11	7	5	33	24	+9	40	
4	Navid Daneh Ramhormuz	22	11	6	5	46	35	+11	39	
5	Jonub Susangerd	22	11	4	7	43	33	+10	37	
6	Iranmehr Khoramshahr	23	9	6	8	30	23	+7	33	
7	Persepolis Veys	23	8	6	9	35	34	+1	30	
8	Sorkh Abi Seydun	22	8	6	8	32	33	−1	30	
9	Ghods Mahshahr	22	6	9	7	28	25	+3	27	
10	Abi Pooshan Hamidieh	23	7	6	10	25	39	−14	27	
11	Anzan Izeh	22	7	4	11	26	33	−7	25	
12	Shahrdari Bandar-e Emam	22	7	4	11	30	40	−10	25	
13	Persepolis Shush	23	3	10	10	35	47	−12	19	
14	Esteghlal Zeydun	22	5	4	13	18	36	−18	19	Relegation to Khuzestan Division 1
15	Pasargad Ramshir	22	3	8	11	22	35	−13	17	Relegation to Khuzestan Division 1

Updated to match(es) played on 18 June 2020. Source: 2019-20 Khuzestan Premier League Table
Rules for classification: 1) Points; 2) Goal difference; 3) Goals scored.

== Results ==
Home \ Away	APH	ANI	BAR	ESZ	FAR	GHM	IRK	JNS	NDR	PSR	PPS	PPV	SBE	SDA	SAS
Abi Pooshan Hamidieh				2–0	0–4							1–0			
Anzan Izeh				3–0					2–4						
Bahmaei Ramhormoz					2–2				1–1				0–0		
Esteghlal Zeydun	0–2		0–1				1–0								
Farhang Ramhormoz	4–0	4–1	2–2												
Ghods Mahshahr														2–2	5–2
Iranmehr Khoramshahr				0–1							3–1		0–0		
Jonub Susangerd												3–0	4–0	4–1	
Navid Daneh Ramhormuz		4–2	1–1		1–0										
Pasargad Ramshir						0–0					1–1	1–4			
Persepolis Shush								2–2		1–1					1–2
Persepolis Veys							1–0	0–3		4–1					
Shahrdari Bandar-e Emam	2–1						0–0	0–4							
Shohadaye Dokoohe Andimeshk						2–2				1–0					3–0
Sorkh Abi Seydun											2–1			0–3	

Updated to match(es) played on 18 September 2019. Source: Khuzestansport Stats
Legend: Blue = home team win; Yellow = draw; Red = away team win.

== See also ==
- 2019–20 Azadegan League
- 2018–19 League 2
- 2018–19 League 3
- 2019–20 Hazfi Cup
- 2020 Iranian Super Cup
