= Kut-e Seyyed =

Kut-e Seyyed (Persian: كوت سيد) may refer to one of these places in Khuzestan Province, Iran:

- Kut-e Seyyed (Khorramshahr County)
- Kut-e Seyyed Enayat (Bavi County)
- Kut-e Seyyed Naim (Dasht-e Azadegan County)
- Kut-e Seyyed Saleh (Karun County)
- Kut-e Seyyed Sharif (Bavi County)
- Kut-e Seyyed Soltan (Bavi County)
