= Boheyr =

Boheyr or Behor or Bohair or Boher or Buher (Persian: بحير) may refer to:

- Boheyr 1, Ahvaz County
- Boheyr 2, Ahvaz County
- Boheyr-e Olya, Bavi County
- Boheyr-e Sofla, Bavi County
