= Qaleh-ye Mazban =

Qaleh-ye Mazban قلعه مزبان
- Village
- Location within Iran
- Coordinates: 31°26′04″N 48°50′06″E
- Country: Iran
- Province: Khuzestan
- County: Bavi
- Bakhsh: Veys
- Rural District: Veys

Population (2006)
  - Total: 360
- Time zone: UTC+3:30 (IRST)
  - Summer (DST): UTC+4:30 (IRDT)

Qaleh-ye Mazban (Persian: قلعه مزبان, also Romanized as Qal‘eh-ye Mazbān; also known as Qal‘eh-ye Marzbān) is a village in Veys Rural District, Veys District, Bavi County, Khuzestan Province, Iran. At the 2006 census, its population was 360, consisting of 64 families.
