= Abu Fazel =

Abu Fazel ابوفاضل
- Village
- Location within Iran
- Coordinates: 31°26′15″N 48°51′23″E
- Country: Iran
- Province: Khuzestan
- County: Bavi
- Bakhsh: Veys
- Rural District: Veys

Population (2006)
  - Total: 841
- Time zone: UTC+3:30 (IRST)
  - Summer (DST): UTC+4:30 (IRDT)

Abu Fazel (Persian: ابوفاضل, also Romanized as Abū Fāzel; also known as Abū Fāẕel-e Zargān, Ālbū Fāzel, Bufāzil, and Zargān-e Abū Fāẕel) is a village in Veys Rural District, Veys District, Bavi County, Khuzestan Province, Iran. At the 2006 census, its population was 841, in 117 families.
