= Gargeh =

Gargeh گارگه
- Village
- Location within Iran
- Coordinates: 31°36′54″N 49°07′16″E
- Country: Iran
- Province: Khuzestan
- County: Bavi
- Bakhsh: Central
- Rural District: Mollasani

Population (2006)
  - Total: 176
- Time zone: UTC+3:30 (IRST)
  - Summer (DST): UTC+4:30 (IRDT)

Gargeh (Persian: گارگه, also Romanized as Gārgeh; also known as Garga and Kārged) is a village in Mollasani Rural District, in the Central District of Bavi County, Khuzestan Province, Iran. At the 2006 census, its population was 176, in 28 families.
