= Sar Dahi =

Sar Dahi سرداحي
- Village
- Location within Iran
- Coordinates: 31°28′54″N 49°02′26″E
- Country: Iran
- Province: Khuzestan
- County: Bavi
- Bakhsh: Veys
- Rural District: Veys

Population (2006)
  - Total: 216
- Time zone: UTC+3:30 (IRST)
  - Summer (DST): UTC+4:30 (IRDT)

Sar Dahi (Persian: سرداحي, also Romanized as Sar Dāḩī, Sardāḩī, and Sar Dāhī) is a village in Veys Rural District, Veys District, Bavi County, Khuzestan Province, Iran. At the 2006 census, its population was 216, including a total of 30 families.
