= Falihi =

Falihi فليحي
- Village
- Location within Iran
- Coordinates: 31°34′48″N 48°57′13″E
- Country: Iran
- Province: Khuzestan
- County: Bavi
- Bakhsh: Central
- Rural District: Mollasani

Population (2006)
  - Total: 170
- Time zone: UTC+3:30 (IRST)
  - Summer (DST): UTC+4:30 (IRDT)

Falihi (Persian: فليحي, also Romanized as Falīḩī and Feleyhī; also known as Falḩī) is a village in Mollasani Rural District, in the Central District of Bavi County, Khuzestan Province, Iran. At the 2006 census, its population was 170, in 36 families.
