= Kut-e Seyyed Soltan =

Village in Khuzestan province, Iran

Kut-e Seyyed Soltan Persian: كوت سيدسلطان
- Village
- Location within Iran
- Coordinates: 31°27′18″N 48°48′46″E
- Country: Iran
- Province: Khuzestan
- County: Bavi
- District: Veys
- Rural District: Zargan

Population (2016)
  - Total: 1,523
- Time zone: UTC+3:30 (IRST)

Kut-e Seyyed Soltan (Persian: كوت سيدسلطان) (Note: Also romanized as Kūt-e Seyyed Solţān) is a village in Zargan Rural District of Veys District, Bavi County, Khuzestan province, Iran.

== Demographics ==
=== Population ===
At the time of the 2006 National Census, the village's population was 1,348 in 196 households, when it was in Veys Rural District of the former Bavi District of Ahvaz County). The following census in 2011 counted 2,006 people in 512 households, by which time the district had been separated from the county in the establishment of Bavi County. The rural district was transferred to the new Veys District, and Kut-e Seyyed Soltan was transferred to Zargan Rural district created in the district. The 2016 census measured the population of the village as 1,523 people in 385 households. It was the most populous village in its rural district.
