= Zargan ol Basreh =

Village in Khuzestan province, Iran

Zargan ol Basreh Persian: زرگان البصره
- Village
- Location within Iran
- Coordinates: 31°25′04″N 48°49′06″E
- Country: Iran
- Province: Khuzestan
- County: Bavi
- District: Veys
- Rural District: Zargan

Population (2016)
  - Total: 795
- Time zone: UTC+3:30 (IRST)

Zargan ol Basreh (Persian: زرگان البصره) is a village in, and the capital of, Zargan Rural District of Veys District, Bavi County, Khuzestan province, Iran.

== History ==
After the National Census of 2006, Bavi District was separated from Ahvaz County in the establishment of Bavi County, and Zargan Rural District was created in the new Veys District.

== Demographics ==
=== Population ===
At the time of the 2011 census, the village's population was 736 people in 170 households. The 2016 census measured the population of the village as 795 people in 202 households.
