= Abu Havan-e Yek =

Abu Havan-e Yek ابوهاون يك
- Village
- Country: Iran
- Province: Khuzestan
- County: Bavi
- Bakhsh: Central
- Rural District: Mollasani

Population (2006)
  - Total: 129
- Time zone: UTC+3:30 (IRST)
  - Summer (DST): UTC+4:30 (IRDT)

Abu Havan-e Yek (Persian: ابوهاون يك, also Romanized as Ābū Hāvan-e Yeḵ) is a village in Mollasani Rural District, in the Central District of Bavi County, Khuzestan Province, Iran. At the 2006 census, its population was 129, in 30 families. Most of its economy rests on farming.
