= Omm ol Balabil =

Omm ol Balabil ام البلابيل
- Village
- Location within Iran
- Coordinates: 31°27′41″N 48°58′29″E
- Country: Iran
- Province: Khuzestan
- County: Bavi
- Bakhsh: Veys
- Rural District: Veys

Population (2006)
  - Total: 194
- Time zone: UTC+3:30 (IRST)
  - Summer (DST): UTC+4:30 (IRDT)

Omm ol Balabil (Persian: ام البلابيل, also Romanized as Omm ol Balābīl; also known as Maraga, Ommé Balabil, and Umm ul Balēbīl) is a village in Veys Rural District, Veys District, Bavi County, Khuzestan Province, Iran. At the 2006 census, its population was 194, in 19 families.
