= Karimdowlati =

Karimdowlati كريمدولتي
- Village
- Country: Iran
- Province: Khuzestan
- County: Bavi
- Bakhsh: Central
- Rural District: Mollasani

Population (2006)
  - Total: 40
- Time zone: UTC+3:30 (IRST)
  - Summer (DST): UTC+4:30 (IRDT)

Karimdowlati (Persian: كريمدولتي, also Romanized as Karīmdowlatī; also known as Moasseseh) is a village in Mollasani Rural District, in the Central District of Bavi County, Khuzestan Province, Iran. At the 2006 census, its population was 40, in 10 families.
