= 2016–17 Khuzestan Premier League =

5th tier Iranian football league season

Khuzestan Premier League
- Season: 2016–17
- Champions: Esteghlal Ramshir
- Matches played: 182
- Goals scored: 542 (2.98 per match)
- Biggest home win: 7-1 (November 25, 2016)
- Biggest away win: 7-2 (March 3, 2017)

The 2016–17 Khuzestan Premier League season was the 17th season of the Khuzestan Premier League which took place from September 15, 2016, to March 17, 2017, with 14 teams competing from the province of Khuzestan. Teams played home and away with one another each playing 26 matches. Esteghlal Ramshir finished the season on top of the standings and was promoted to division 3 of the Iranian football system. Meanwhile, finishing in last place, Jam Abadan will be relegated to the Khuzestan Division 1 league. Following negotiations between the Khuzestan Football Association and the Iranian football federation, the division 3 quota for Khuzestan was increased by 1 allowing Sepahan Izeh, the runners-up of this year's league to also get promoted to division 3.

== Teams ==
Team	Location	Stadium	Capacity
Esteghlal Ramshir	Ramshir	Takhti Ramshir Arena	10,000
Sepahan Izeh	Izeh	Takhti Izeh Arena	10,000
Shahin Dezab (Shahr e Emam)	Dezab	Shahid Mehrvali Arena	5,000
Abi Pooshan Hamidie	Hamidiyeh	Takhti Hamidie Arena	5,000
Jonub Susangerd	Susangerd	Takhti Susangerd Arena	10,000
Shahbaz Shadegan	Shadegan	Takhti Shadegan Arena	10,000
Anzan Izeh	Izeh	Takhti Izeh Arena	10,000
Jonub Bagh-e malek	Bagh-e Malek	Bagh-e malek Martyrs Arena	5,000
Parsian Bandar-e Emam	Bandar-e Emam Khomeyni	Takhti Bandar-e Emam Arena	10,000
Persepolis Veys	Veys	Veys Martyrs Arena	5,000
Esteghlal Veys	Veys	Veys Martyrs Arena	5,000
Pakdelan Abadan	Abadan	5 Mehr Abadan Arena	5,000
Javid Karun	Ahvaz	Ahvaz Workers Arena	5,000
Jam Abadan	Abadan	17 Shahrivar Arena	5,000

== Final standings ==
Pos	Team	Pld	W	D	L	GF	GA	GD	Pts	Qualification or relegation
1	Esteghlal Ramshir	26	17	6	3	53	22	+31	57	Promotion to Division 3
2	Sepahan Izeh	26	15	7	4	61	22	+39	52	Promotion to Division 3
3	Shahin Dezab	26	14	8	4	47	23	+24	50	
4	Abi Pooshan Hamidie	26	13	6	7	36	25	+11	45	
5	Jonub Susangerd	26	13	5	8	46	34	+12	44	
6	Shahbaz Shadegan	26	10	8	8	36	26	+10	38	
7	Anzan Izeh	26	10	8	8	37	30	+7	38	
8	Jonub Bagh-e malek	26	11	5	10	41	38	+3	38	
9	Parsian Bandar-e Emam	26	10	7	9	40	42	−2	37	
10	Persepolis Veys	26	9	8	9	34	41	−7	35	
11	Esteghlal Veys	26	9	3	14	39	50	−11	30	
12	Pakdelan Abadan	26	5	7	14	29	47	−18	22	
13	Javid Karun	26	5	1	20	30	77	−47	16	
14	Jam Abadan	26	0	3	23	10	65	−55	3	Relegation to Khuzestan Division 1

Updated to match(es) played on 17 March 2017. Source: 2016-17 Khuzestan Premier League Table
Rules for classification: 1) Points; 2) Goal difference; 3) Goals scored.

== Results ==
Home \ Away	ESR	SPI	SEE	APH	JSG	SHS	AIZ	JBM	PBE	PPV	ESV	PDA	JAK	JAB
Esteghlal Ramshir		1–1	2–1	2–1	2–2	2–1	2–0	3–1	2–1	6–1	1–0	1–0	4–0	5–1
Sepahan Izeh	1–0		0–1	3–1	4–0	1–0	1–1	5–0	3–2	1–1	4–0	3–0	7–1	3–0
Shahin Dezab	0–1	1–0		1–1	2–1	1–0	0–0	3–2	0–0	2–0	4–1	4–1	6–2	1–1
Abi Pooshan Hamidie	1–0	1–0	1–1		3–0	1–1	0–0	2–0	0–1	2–1	2–1	2–1	1–0	3–0
Jonub Susangerd	1–4	3–1	1–1	2–1		2–0	4–1	2–1	1–1	5–2	4–0	1–0	0–1	3–0
Shahbaz Shadegan	3–1	1–1	0–3	1–1	0–0		0–2	1–0	4–0	3–1	2–2	1–1	4–0	3–0
Anzan Izeh	1–1	0–1	2–0	1–3	2–1	2–2		2–0	3–1	0–0	3–0	3–0	0–2	1–0
Jonub Bagh-e malek	2–2	0–1	2–2	1–0	0–0	1–2	2–2		3–0	2–1	2–1	2–1	3–1	3–0
Parsian Bandar-e Emam	1–2	3–3	0–1	1–1	3–1	1–1	1–0	3–1		1–1	0–3	2–1	4–2	4–2
Persepolis Veys	1–0	1–1	1–0	1–0	1–3	1–0	2–2	0–3	2–2		0–1	3–3	3–0	3–0
Esteghlal Veys	0–3	2–2	3–3	3–0	2–3	1–0	2–1	0–2	4–0	1–2		3–0	4–3	3–1
Pakdelan Abadan	1–1	0–4	0–3	0–2	2–1	0–2	3–2	2–2	1–2	1–1	4–0		1–0	1–1
Javid Karun	1–1	2–7	1–3	1–3	0–4	1–3	2–3	1–4	0–3	2–3	2–1	1–5		1–0
Jam Abadan	0–3	0–3	0–3	2–3	0–1	0–4	0–3	1–2	0–3	0–1	1–2	0–0	0–3	

Updated to match(es) played on 12 July 2019. Source: Khuzestansport Stats
Legend: Blue = home team win; Yellow = draw; Red = away team win.

== See also ==
- 2016–17 Azadegan League
- 2016–17 League 2
- 2016–17 League 3
- 2016–17 Hazfi Cup
- 2016 Iranian Super Cup
