= Beyt-e Maluh =

Beyt-e Maluh بيتملوح
- Village
- Location within Iran
- Coordinates: 31°25′12″N 48°51′42″E
- Country: Iran
- Province: Khuzestan
- County: Bavi
- Bakhsh: Veys
- Rural District: Veys

Population (2006)
  - Total: 77
- Time zone: UTC+3:30 (IRST)
  - Summer (DST): UTC+4:30 (IRDT)

Beyt-e Maluh (Persian: بيتملوح, also Romanized as Beyt-e Malūḩ, Baité Malooh, and Beyt-e Mallūḩ; also known as Beyt-e Mallūkh) is a village in Veys Rural District, Veys District, Bavi County, Khuzestan Province, Iran. At the 2006 census, its population was 77, in 10 families.
