= Naddafiyeh =

Naddafiyeh ندافيه
- Village
- Location within Iran
- Coordinates: 31°36′17″N 48°53′00″E
- Country: Iran
- Province: Khuzestan
- County: Bavi
- Bakhsh: Central
- Rural District: Mollasani

Population (2006)
  - Total: 2,429
- Time zone: UTC+3:30 (IRST)
  - Summer (DST): UTC+4:30 (IRDT)

Naddafiyeh (Persian: ندافيه, also Romanized as Naddāfīyeh) is a village in Mollasani Rural District, in the Central District of Bavi County, Khuzestan Province, Iran. At the 2006 census, its population was 2,429, in 548 families.
