= 2017–18 Khuzestan Premier League =

Khuzestan Premier League
- Season: 2017–18
- Champions: Esteghlal Novin Mahshahr
- Matches played: 240
- Goals scored: 718 (2.99 per match)
- Biggest home win: 6-0 (September 6, 2017)
- Biggest away win: 4-0 (February 22, 2018)

The 2017–18 Khuzestan Premier League season was the 18th season of the Khuzestan Premier League which took place from September 6, 2017 to March 14, 2018 with 16 teams competing from the province of Khuzestan. This was the first year that the league increased its teams from 14 to 16. Teams played home and away with one another each playing 30 matches. Esteghlal Novin Mahshahr finished the season on top of the standings and was promoted to division 3 of the Iranian football system. Meanwhile, finishing in last place, Shahbaz Shadegan will be relegated to the Khuzestan Division 1 league.

== League changes ==
With 5 teams being relegated down from Division 3, the Khuzestan Football Association announced that the league will be expanded from 14 to 16 teams in an effort to accommodate the relegated teams. Since only 1 team is promoted every year to Division 3, the 5 relegated teams would have created an unbalanced league under the 14 team system.

== Teams ==
Team	Location	Stadium	Capacity
Esteghlal Novin Mahshahr	Mahshahr	Mahshahr Martyrs Arena	10,000
Persepolis Novin Dezful	Mianrud	Mianrud Martyrs Arena	5,000
Jonub Susangerd	Susangerd	Susangerd Martyrs Arena	5,000
Persepolis Shush	Shush	Takhti Shush Arena	5,000
Shahrdari Bandar-e Emam	Bandar-e Emam	Takhti Bandar-e Emam Arena	10,000
Iranmehr Khoramshahr	Khoramshahr	Shahrdari Khoramshahr Arena	5,000
Shahin Shahr-e Emam	Dezful	Mehrvali Arena	5,000
Persepolis Veys	Veys	Veys Martyrs Arena	5,000
Abi Pooshan Hamidieh	Hamidiyeh	Hamidieh Martyrs Arena	5,000
Anzan Novin Izeh	Izeh	Takhti Izeh Arena	10,000
Bahmaei Ramhormoz	Ramhormoz	Takhti Ramhormoz Arena	10,000
Omid Andishe Shushtar	Shushtar	Takhti Shushtar Arena	10,000
Rakhsh Arvand Abadan	Abadan	Shahrdari Abadan Arena	5,000
Esteghlal Veys	Veys	Veys Martyrs Arena	5,000
Esteghlal Masjedsoleiman	Masjed Soleiman	Naftun Masjed Soleiman Arena	5,000
Shahbaz Shadegan	Shadegan	Takhti Shadegan Arena	10,000

== Final standings ==
Pos	Team	Pld	W	D	L	GF	GA	GD	Pts	Qualification or relegation
1	Esteghlal Novin Mahshahr	30	18	8	4	41	23	+18	62	Promotion to Division 3
2	Persepolis Novin Dezful	30	19	4	7	63	29	+34	61	
3	Jonub Susangerd	30	19	4	7	75	47	+28	61	
4	Persepolis Shush	30	16	8	6	56	36	+20	56	
5	Shahrdari Bandar-e Emam	30	17	4	9	51	34	+17	55	
6	Iranmehr Khoramshahr	30	12	9	9	43	37	+6	45	
7	Shahin Shahr-e Emam	30	12	7	11	51	46	+5	43	
8	Persepolis Veys	30	11	7	12	46	42	+4	40	
9	Abi Pooshan Hamidieh	30	9	8	13	32	44	−12	35	
10	Anzan Novin Izeh	30	9	5	16	37	53	−16	32	
11	Bahmaei Ramhormoz	30	7	10	13	31	39	−8	31	
12	Omid Andishe Shushtar	30	7	8	15	52	60	−8	29	
13	Rakhsh Arvand Abadan	30	6	11	13	37	49	−12	29	
14	Esteghlal Veys	30	8	5	17	38	56	−18	29	
15	Esteghlal Masjedsoleiman	30	6	10	14	28	60	−32	28	
16	Shahbaz Shadegan	30	7	6	17	37	63	−26	27	Relegation to Khuzestan Division 1

Updated to match(es) played on 17 March 2017. Source: 2017-18 Khuzestan Premier League Table
Rules for classification: 1) Points; 2) Goal difference; 3) Goals scored.

== Results ==
Home \ Away	ANI	APH	BAR	ENM	ESM	ESV	IRK	JOS	OAS	PND	PPS	PPV	RAA	SBE	SHS	SSE
Anzan Novin Izeh		2–1	0–1	0–1	4–0	3–1	1–2	1–3	2–1	0–0	1–0	1–4	1–1	2–1	0–2	1–1
Abi Pooshan Hamidieh	3–1		0–1	1–4	1–0	1–0	2–2	1–4	2–1	0–4	1–1	2–2	2–1	0–3	2–0	1–1
Bahmaei Ramhormoz	0–1	1–0		1–1	1–3	3–0	0–1	1–3	2–2	2–2	3–5	0–1	3–0	0–2	2–1	0–0
Esteghlal Novin Mahshahr	1–0	0–0	1–0		2–0	1–0	1–0	0–0	4–3	1–0	4–3	2–2	2–0	0–2	3–2	2–2
Esteghlal Masjedsoleiman	3–3	0–0	1–0	1–1		1–0	1–1	0–2	2–1	0–2	1–1	2–0	0–0	3–3	4–0	0–3
Esteghlal Veys	1–3	1–0	2–0	1–2	2–0		1–3	1–2	2–2	1–2	3–3	1–0	1–1	1–1	4–1	2–1
Iranmehr Khoramshahr	4–1	2–2	0–0	0–0	1–1	0–1		4–0	2–3	0–1	1–1	1–0	2–1	2–0	3–4	0–0
Jonub Susangerd	1–0	2–3	4–4	2–1	5–0	3–0	4–0		7–1	3–2	3–2	4–2	2–2	2–1	3–0	3–0
Omid Andishe Shushtar	3–2	2–0	1–1	0–1	4–1	4–2	0–1	1–2		1–2	0–1	5–3	0–1	1–1	4–4	3–3
Persepolis Novin Dezful	4–0	2–1	0–1	2–1	6–0	2–0	2–4	2–0	2–1		4–1	0–0	5–2	1–1	3–1	4–0
Persepolis Shush	1–0	2–0	0–0	0–0	4–1	2–1	0–0	4–2	2–1	3–2		3–1	2–0	3–0	4–1	2–0
Persepolis Veys	4–1	1–0	2–1	0–2	3–0	1–1	4–3	4–1	1–1	0–1	0–1		1–0	4–0	0–0	2–0
Rakhsh Arvand Abadan	1–1	1–1	1–1	0–1	2–2	6–4	0–1	2–2	1–1	1–0	2–1	2–1		1–2	1–1	2–0
Shahrdari Bandar-e Emam	3–0	0–1	1–0	1–0	4–0	3–0	3–0	2–1	3–2	2–3	1–0	3–0	4–2		0–2	1–0
Shahbaz Shadegan	0–3	0–4	0–0	0–1	1–1	1–2	1–2	5–3	1–2	1–3	1–2	0–0	3–2	1–0		3–0
Shahin Shahr-e Emam	5–2	3–0	4–2	0–1	3–0	4–2	2–1	1–2	2–1	1–0	2–2	4–3	2–1	2–3	5–0	

Updated to match(es) played on 15 July 2019. Source: Khuzestansport Stats
Legend: Blue = home team win; Yellow = draw; Red = away team win.

== See also ==
- 2017–18 Azadegan League
- 2017–18 League 2
- 2017–18 League 3
- 2017–18 Hazfi Cup
- 2017 Iranian Super Cup
