= Kaediyeh =

Kaediyeh كاييديه
- Village
- Location within Iran
- Coordinates: 31°38′22″N 49°05′27″E
- Country: Iran
- Province: Khuzestan
- County: Bavi
- Bakhsh: Central
- Rural District: Mollasani

Population (2006)
  - Total: 97
- Time zone: UTC+3:30 (IRST)
  - Summer (DST): UTC+4:30 (IRDT)

Kaediyeh (Persian: كاييديه, also Romanized as Kā’edīyeh and Kaidiyēh; also known as Qā‘edīyeh) is a village in Mollasani Rural District, in the Central District of Bavi County, Khuzestan Province, Iran. At the 2006 census, its population was 97, in 25 families.
