= Jelieh =

Jelieh or Jalieh (Persian: جليعه) may refer to:

- Jalieh, Ahvaz
- Jelieh, Bavi
- Jalieh, Shushtar
