= Nahriyeh =

Nahriyeh نهريه
- Village
- Location within Iran
- Coordinates: 31°28′39″N 49°05′56″E
- Country: Iran
- Province: Khuzestan
- County: Bavi
- Bakhsh: Veys
- Rural District: Veys

Population (2006)
  - Total: 22
- Time zone: UTC+3:30 (IRST)
  - Summer (DST): UTC+4:30 (IRDT)

Nahriyeh (Persian: نهريه, also Romanized as Nahrīyeh; also known as Mor‘īyeh) is a village in Veys Rural District, Veys District, Bavi County, Khuzestan Province, Iran. At the 2006 census, its population was 22, in 4 families.
