= Beyt-e Mohareb =

Beyt-e Mohareb بيت محارب
- Village
- Location within Iran
- Coordinates: 31°24′01″N 48°51′23″E
- Country: Iran
- Province: Khuzestan
- County: Bavi
- Bakhsh: Veys
- Rural District: Veys

Population (2006)
  - Total: 1,215
- Time zone: UTC+3:30 (IRST)
  - Summer (DST): UTC+4:30 (IRDT)

Beyt-e Mohareb (Persian: بيت محارب, also Romanized as Beyt-e Moḩāreb and Beyt-e Maḩāreb; also known as Bait-i-Muhārib) is a village in Veys Rural District, Veys District, Bavi County, Khuzestan Province, Iran. At the 2006 census, its population was 1,215, in 172 families.
