= Zoveyr =

Zoveyr (Persian: گبير) may refer to:

- Zoveyr-e Chari
- Zoveyr-e Kharamzeh

== See also ==
- Zuair
