= Robeykheh =

Village in Khuzestan province, Iran

Robeykheh Persian: ربيخه
- Village
- Location within Iran
- Coordinates: 31°25′46″N 48°55′39″E
- Country: Iran
- Province: Khuzestan
- County: Bavi
- District: Veys
- Rural District: Veys

Population (2016)
  - Total: 613
- Time zone: UTC+3:30 (IRST)

Robeykheh (Persian: ربيخه) (Note: Also romanized as Robaikheh; also known as Rabika and Robekeh) is a village in Veys Rural District of Veys District, Bavi County, Khuzestan province, Iran.

== Demographics ==
=== Population ===
At the time of the 2006 National Census, the village's population was 244 in 39 households, when it was in the former Bavi District of Ahvaz County). The following census in 2011 counted 615 people in 149 households, by which time the district had been separated from the county in the establishment of Bavi County. The rural district was transferred to the new Veys District. The 2016 census measured the population of the village as 613 people in 159 households. It was the most populous village in its rural district.
