= Koheysh =

Koheysh كهيش
- Village
- Location within Iran
- Coordinates: 31°39′31″N 49°06′55″E
- Country: Iran
- Province: Khuzestan
- County: Bavi
- Bakhsh: Central
- Rural District: Mollasani

Population (2006)
  - Total: 72
- Time zone: UTC+3:30 (IRST)
  - Summer (DST): UTC+4:30 (IRDT)

Koheysh (Persian: كهيش, also Romanized as Kaheysh, Kahish, and Kahyesh) is a village in Mollasani Rural District, located in the Central District of Bavi County, Khuzestan Province, Iran. It had a population of 72, in 13 families according to the 2006 census.
