= Beyt-e Matlib =

Beyt-e Matlib بيت مطليب
- Village
- Country: Iran
- Province: Khuzestan
- County: Bavi
- Bakhsh: Central
- Rural District: Mollasani

Population (2006)
  - Total: 60
- Time zone: UTC+3:30 (IRST)
  - Summer (DST): UTC+4:30 (IRDT)

Beyt-e Matlib (Persian: بيت مطليب, also Romanized as Beyt-e Maṭlīb) is a village in Mollasani Rural District, in the Central District of Bavi County, Khuzestan Province, Iran. At the 2006 census, its population was 60, in 13 families.
