= Honeyri =

Honeyri or Haneyri (Persian: حنيري) may refer to:

- Honeyri 1
- Honeyri 2
- Honeyri 3
