= Am Alsarajineh =

Am Alsarajineh ام السراجينه
- Village
- Country: Iran
- Province: Khuzestan
- County: Bavi
- Bakhsh: Central
- Rural District: Mollasani

Population (2006)
  - Total: 309
- Time zone: UTC+3:30 (IRST)
  - Summer (DST): UTC+4:30 (IRDT)

Am Alsarajineh (Persian: ام السراجينه, also Romanized as Ām Ālsarājīneh) is a village in Mollasani Rural District, in the Central District of Bavi County, Khuzestan Province, Iran. At the 2006 census, its population was 309, in 54 families.
