= Daravizeh =

Daravizeh دراويزه
- Village
- Location within Iran
- Coordinates: 31°37′29″N 48°53′01″E
- Country: Iran
- Province: Khuzestan
- County: Bavi
- Bakhsh: Central
- Rural District: Mollasani

Population (2006)
  - Total: 230
- Time zone: UTC+3:30 (IRST)
  - Summer (DST): UTC+4:30 (IRDT)

Daravizeh (Persian: دراويزه, also Romanized as Darāvīzeh; also known as Dar Āvīz) is a village in Mollasani Rural District, in the Central District of Bavi County, Khuzestan Province, Iran. At the 2006 census, its population was 230, in 45 families.
