= Senijeh =

Senijeh سنيجه
- Village
- Location within Iran
- Coordinates: 31°41′00″N 48°59′30″E
- Country: Iran
- Province: Khuzestan
- County: Bavi
- Bakhsh: Central
- Rural District: Mollasani

Population (2006)
  - Total: 222
- Time zone: UTC+3:30 (IRST)
  - Summer (DST): UTC+4:30 (IRDT)

Senijeh (Persian: سنيجه, also Romanized as Senījeh; also known as Sanīcheh and Sīncheh) is a village in Mollasani Rural District, in the Central District of Bavi County, Khuzestan Province, Iran. At the 2006 census, its population was 222, in 31 families.
