= 2015–16 Khuzestan Premier League =

5th tier Iranian football season

Khuzestan Premier League
- Season: 2015–16
- Champions: Persepolis Shush
- Matches played: 182
- Goals scored: 505 (2.77 per match)
- Biggest home win: 7-1 (November 6, 2015)
- Biggest away win: 7-2 (November 27, 2015)

The 2015–16 Khuzestan Premier League season was the 16th season of the Khuzestan Premier League which took place from September 25, 2015, to March 17, 2016, with 14 teams competing from the province of Khuzestan. Teams played home and away with one another each playing 26 matches. Persepolis Shush finished the season on top of the standings and was promoted to division 3 of the Iranian football system. Meanwhile, finishing in last place, Yaran Abadan will be relegated to the Khuzestan Division 1 league.

== Teams ==
Team	Location	Stadium	Capacity
Persepolis Shush	Shush	Takhti Shush Arena	5,000
Esteghlal Ramhormoz	Ramhormoz	Takhti Ramhormoz Arena	10,000
Esteghlal Khoramshahr	Khorramshahr	Shahrdari Khorramshahr Arena	5,000
Sepahan Izeh	Izeh	Takhti Izeh Arena	10,000
Abi Pooshan Hamidieh	Hamidiyeh	Takhti Hamidieh Arena	5,000
Persepolis Veys	Veys	Veys Martyrs Arena	5,000
Esteghlal Ramshir	Ramshir	Takhti Ramshir Arena	10,000
Jonub Sheyban	Mollasani	Mollasani Martyrs Arena	5,000
Vahdat Andimeshk	Andimeshk	Sarvandi Arena	5,000
Shahbaz Shadegan	Shadegan	Takhti Shadegan Arena	10,000
Parsian Bandar-e Emam	Bandar-e Emam Khomeyni	Takhti Bandar-e Emam Arena	10,000
Pakdelan Abadan	Abadan	5 Mehr Abadan Arena	5,000
Mahshahr Golden Stars	Mahshahr	Mahshahr Martyrs Arena	10,000
Yaran Abadan	Abadan	5 Mehr Abadan Arena	5,000

== Final standings ==
Pos	Team	Pld	W	D	L	GF	GA	GD	Pts	Qualification or relegation
1	Persepolis Shush	26	17	6	3	48	23	+25	57	Promotion to Division 3
2	Esteghlal Ramhormoz	26	17	5	4	46	16	+30	56	
3	Esteghlal Khoramshahr	26	14	7	5	41	28	+13	49	
4	Sepahan Izeh	26	12	5	9	51	28	+23	41	
5	Abi Pooshan Hamidieh	26	12	4	10	34	36	−2	40	
6	Persepolis Veys	26	11	6	9	38	28	+10	39	
7	Esteghlal Ramshir	26	11	6	9	36	32	+4	39	
8	Jonub Sheyban	26	10	8	8	48	38	+10	38	
9	Vahdat Andimeshk	26	11	4	11	43	34	+9	37	
10	Shahbaz Shadegan	26	8	6	12	31	32	−1	30	
11	Parsian Bandar-e Emam	26	7	8	11	26	44	−18	29	
12	Pakdelan Abadan	26	7	3	16	27	39	−12	24	
13	Mahshahr Golden Stars	26	7	3	16	32	55	−23	24	
14	Yaran Abadan	26	0	3	23	4	72	−68	3	Relegation to Khuzestan Division 1

Updated to match(es) played on 17 March 2017. Source: 2015-16 Khuzestan Premier League Table
Rules for classification: 1) Points; 2) Goal difference; 3) Goals scored.

== Results ==
Home \ Away	APH	ERA	ESK	ESR	JBS	MGS	PAB	PBE	PPS	PPV	SEI	SHS	VAA	YAA
Abi Pooshan Hamidieh		0–0	1–2	1–0	2–0	1–0	1–1	1–1	2–4	1–0	1–1	4–3	0–2	2–1
Esteghlal Ramhormoz	2–1		3–0	0–1	4–2	3–0	1–0	2–0	1–0	3–0	3–2	1–0	3–0	5–2
Esteghlal Khoramshahr	3–1	1–1		2–2	1–1	1–1	0–1	1–1	3–0	3–0	1–0	1–0	2–1	3–0
Esteghlal Ramshir	0–1	0–2	0–1		4–1	2–0	2–0	2–1	2–2	1–1	1–0	3–0	2–0	0–0
Jonub Sheyban	1–0	0–0	1–2	7–2		1–2	2–0	4–0	1–1	2–0	2–1	2–2	1–1	3–0
Mahshahr Golden Stars	0–3	0–2	2–6	1–0	0–4		1–1	3–1	1–2	0–2	3–3	4–1	2–0	3–0
Pakdelan Abadan	4–0	0–2	0–1	0–3	2–1	2–1		1–2	1–4	2–0	2–1	3–2	1–3	3–0
Parsian Bandar-e Emam	0–1	1–1	1–1	0–0	0–3	5–2	0–0		0–3	1–0	1–3	2–1	1–0	0–0
Persepolis Shush	2–1	1–0	3–1	1–1	1–1	4–2	1–0	4–1		1–0	1–0	1–1	3–0	3–0
Persepolis Veys	6–0	2–1	3–1	1–2	2–2	4–0	1–0	1–3	1–0		3–0	2–1	0–0	2–0
Sepahan Izeh	1–2	1–1	2–0	2–0	3–1	3–0	4–1	7–1	1–2	1–1		2–0	3–1	3–0
Shahbaz Shadegan	2–1	0–1	0–0	3–0	7–2	1–0	1–0	0–0	0–1	0–0	0–0		0–1	1–0
Vahdat Andimeshk	0–3	2–1	3–0	5–2	1–1	3–0	3–1	3–0	1–2	3–3	0–1	1–2		6–0
Yaran Abadan	0–3	0–0	0–2	0–4	0–2	0–4	0–1	0–3	1–1	0–3	0–6	0–3	0–3	

Updated to match(es) played on 12 July 2019. Source: Khuzestansport Stats
Legend: Blue = home team win; Yellow = draw; Red = away team win.

== See also ==
- 2015–16 Azadegan League
- 2015–16 League 2
- 2015–16 League 3
- 2015–16 Hazfi Cup
- 2015 Iranian Super Cup
