= Kheyt ol Rovas =

Kheyt ol Rovas خيطالرواس
- Village
- Country: Iran
- Province: Khuzestan
- County: Bavi
- Bakhsh: Veys
- Rural District: Veys

Population (2006)
  - Total: 3,558
- Time zone: UTC+3:30 (IRST)
  - Summer (DST): UTC+4:30 (IRDT)

Kheyt ol Rovas (Persian: خيطالرواس, also Romanized as Kheyṭ ol Rovās) is a village in Veys Rural District, Veys District, Bavi County, Khuzestan Province, Iran. At the 2006 census, its population was 3,558, in 547 families.
