= Sheykh Fozeyl =

Sheykh Fozeyl شيخ فضيل
- Village
- Location within Iran
- Coordinates: 31°33′05″N 49°02′39″E
- Country: Iran
- Province: Khuzestan
- County: Bavi
- Bakhsh: Central
- Rural District: Mollasani

Population (2006)
  - Total: 69
- Time zone: UTC+3:30 (IRST)
  - Summer (DST): UTC+4:30 (IRDT)

Sheykh Fozeyl (Persian: شيخ فضيل, also Romanized as Sheykh Foẕeyl; also known as Sheykh Foẕeylī) is a village in Mollasani Rural District, in the Central District of Bavi County, Khuzestan Province, Iran. At the 2006 census, its population was 69, in 16 families.
