= Omm ol Helianeh =

Omm ol Helianeh ام الحليانه
- Village
- Location within Iran
- Coordinates: 31°23′15″N 49°04′01″E
- Country: Iran
- Province: Khuzestan
- County: Bavi
- Bakhsh: Veys
- Rural District: Veys

Population (2006)
  - Total: 31
- Time zone: UTC+3:30 (IRST)
  - Summer (DST): UTC+4:30 (IRDT)

Omm ol Helianeh (Persian: ام الحليانه, also Romanized as Omm ol Helīāneh; also known as Om Helyāneh, Om Helyāneh-ye Now, Omm-e Halyāneh, and Ommoḩleyāneh) is a village in Veys Rural District, Veys District, Bavi County, Khuzestan Province, Iran. At the 2006 census, its population was 31, in 6 families.
