= Honeyri-ye Do =

Honeyri-ye Do حنيري دو
- Village
- Location within Iran
- Coordinates: 31°30′16″N 49°03′42″E
- Country: Iran
- Province: Khuzestan
- County: Bavi
- Bakhsh: Central
- Rural District: Mollasani

Population (2006)
  - Total: 52
- Time zone: UTC+3:30 (IRST)
  - Summer (DST): UTC+4:30 (IRDT)

Honeyri-ye Do (Persian: حنيري دو, also Romanized as Honeyrī-ye Do) is a village in Mollasani Rural District, in the Central District of Bavi County, Khuzestan Province, Iran. At the 2006 census, its population was 52, in 12 families.
