= Zoveyr-e Chari =

Zoveyr-e Chari زويرچري
- Village
- Location within Iran
- Coordinates: 31°34′46″N 48°56′51″E
- Country: Iran
- Province: Khuzestan
- County: Bavi
- Bakhsh: Central
- Rural District: Mollasani

Population (2006)
  - Total: 267
- Time zone: UTC+3:30 (IRST)
  - Summer (DST): UTC+4:30 (IRDT)

Zoveyr-e Chari (Persian: زويرچري, also Romanized as Zoveyr-e Charī, Zoveyr-e Cherī, and Zovairé Cheri) is a village in Mollasani Rural District, in the Central District of Bavi County, Khuzestan Province, Iran. At the 2006 census, its population was 267, in 49 families.
