= Gesvan-e Seh =

Gesvan-e Seh گسوان سه
- Village
- Location within Iran
- Coordinates: 31°27′19″N 49°06′13″E
- Country: Iran
- Province: Khuzestan
- County: Bavi
- Bakhsh: Veys
- Rural District: Veys

Population (2006)
  - Total: 36
- Time zone: UTC+3:30 (IRST)
  - Summer (DST): UTC+4:30 (IRDT)

Gesvan-e Seh (Persian: گسوان سه, also Romanized as Geşvān-e Seh and Gaswané Seh; also known as Gīsovān-e Seh and Gīsvān-e Seh) is a village in Veys Rural District, Veys District, Bavi County, Khuzestan Province, Iran. At the 2006 census, its population was 36, in 6 families.
