= Mului =

Mului (Persian: مولوي) may refer to:

- Mului, Kerman
- Mului, Khuzestan
