= Omm ol Gharib =

Omm ol Gharib (Persian: ام الغريب) may refer to:

- Omm ol Gharib-e Bozorg
- Omm ol Gharib-e Kuchek
