= Nagazeh =

Nagazeh (Persian: گبير) may refer to one of two villages in Iran:

- Nagazeh-ye Bozorg
- Nagazeh-ye Kuchak
