= Gesvan-e Do =

Gesvan-e Do گسوان2
- Village
- Location within Iran
- Coordinates: 31°26′12″N 49°05′09″E
- Country: Iran
- Province: Khuzestan
- County: Bavi
- Bakhsh: Veys
- Rural District: Veys

Population (2006)
  - Total: 77
- Time zone: UTC+3:30 (IRST)
  - Summer (DST): UTC+4:30 (IRDT)

Gesvan-e Do (Persian: گسوان2, also Romanized as Geşvān-e Do and Gaswané Dow; also known as Gīsovān-e Do) is a village in Veys Rural District, Veys District, Bavi County, Khuzestan Province, Iran. At the 2006 census, its population was 77, in 10 families.
