= Omm ol Gharib-e Bozorg =

Omm ol Gharib-e Bozorg ام الغريب بزرگ
- Village
- Location within Iran
- Coordinates: 31°29′56″N 48°58′46″E
- Country: Iran
- Province: Khuzestan
- County: Bavi
- Bakhsh: Veys
- Rural District: Veys

Population (2006)
  - Total: 203
- Time zone: UTC+3:30 (IRST)
  - Summer (DST): UTC+4:30 (IRDT)

Omm ol Gharib-e Bozorg (Persian: ام الغريب بزرگ, also Romanized as Omm ol Gharīb-e Bozorg; also known as Ommé Gharibehé Bozorg, Omm ol Gharīb, Omm ol Qarīb, and Omm-ol Qarīd) is a village in Veys Rural District, Veys District, Bavi County, Khuzestan Province, Iran. At the 2006 census, its population was 203, in 26 families.
