= Kut-e Seyyed Enayat =

Kut-e Seyyed Enayat كوت سيدعنايت
- Village
- Location within Iran
- Coordinates: 31°25′27″N 48°47′32″E
- Country: Iran
- Province: Khuzestan
- County: Bavi
- Bakhsh: Veys
- Rural District: Veys

Population (2006)
  - Total: 591
- Time zone: UTC+3:30 (IRST)
  - Summer (DST): UTC+4:30 (IRDT)

Kut-e Seyyed Enayat (Persian: كوت سيدعنايت, also Romanized as Kūt-e Seyyed ‘Enāyat; also known as Anaīyeh, Kūt-e Seyyed ‘Enāyah, Kūt Saiyid ‘Anaīyeh, and Seyyed ‘Enāyat) is a village in Veys Rural District, Veys District, Bavi County, Khuzestan Province, Iran. At the 2006 census, its population was 591, in 102 families.
