= Boheyr-e Sofla =

Boheyr-e Sofla بحيرسفلي
- Village
- Location within Iran
- Coordinates: 31°42′19″N 48°55′29″E
- Country: Iran
- Province: Khuzestan
- County: Bavi
- Bakhsh: Central
- Rural District: Mollasani

Population (2006)
  - Total: 40
- Time zone: UTC+3:30 (IRST)
  - Summer (DST): UTC+4:30 (IRDT)

Boheyr-e Sofla (Persian: بحيرسفلي, also Romanized as Boḩeyr-e Soflá and Boḩeyr-e Soflā; also known as Bohair, Boḩer, and Būḩer) is a village in Mollasani Rural District, in the Central District of Bavi County, Khuzestan Province, Iran. At the 2006 census, its population was 40, in 8 families.
