= Gesvan-e Yek =

Gesvan-e Yek گسوان1
- Village
- Location within Iran
- Coordinates: 31°26′51″N 49°05′00″E
- Country: Iran
- Province: Khuzestan
- County: Bavi
- Bakhsh: Veys
- Rural District: Veys

Population (2006)
  - Total: 109
- Time zone: UTC+3:30 (IRST)
  - Summer (DST): UTC+4:30 (IRDT)

Gesvan-e Yek (Persian: گسوان1, also Romanized as Geşvān-e Yek, Gaswané Yek, and Gesvān Yak; also known as Gīsovān-e Yek, and Gīsvān-e Yek) is a village in Veys Rural District, Veys District, Bavi County, Khuzestan Province, Iran. At the 2006 census, its population was 109, in 13 families.
