= Honeyri-ye Seh =

Honeyri-ye Seh حنيري سه
- Village
- Location within Iran
- Coordinates: 31°30′31″N 49°04′03″E
- Country: Iran
- Province: Khuzestan
- County: Bavi
- Bakhsh: Central
- Rural District: Mollasani

Population (2006)
  - Total: 41
- Time zone: UTC+3:30 (IRST)
  - Summer (DST): UTC+4:30 (IRDT)

Honeyri-ye Seh (Persian: حنيري سه, also Romanized as Honeyrī-ye Seh) is a village in Mollasani Rural District, in the Central District of Bavi County, Khuzestan Province, Iran. At the 2006 census, its population was 41, in 7 families.
