= Jelieh, Bavi =

Jelieh جليعه
- Village
- Location within Iran
- Coordinates: 31°39′49″N 48°53′55″E
- Country: Iran
- Province: Khuzestan
- County: Bavi
- Bakhsh: Central
- Rural District: Mollasani

Population (2006)
  - Total: 350
- Time zone: UTC+3:30 (IRST)
  - Summer (DST): UTC+4:30 (IRDT)

Jelieh (Persian: جليعه, also Romanized as Jelī‘eh and Jalī‘eh) is a village in Mollasani Rural District, in the Central District of Bavi County, Khuzestan Province, Iran. At the 2006 census, its population was 350, in 69 families.
