= Omm ol Gharib-e Kuchek =

Omm ol Gharib-e Kuchek ام الغريب كوچك
- Village
- Location within Iran
- Coordinates: 31°30′37″N 48°59′20″E
- Country: Iran
- Province: Khuzestan
- County: Bavi
- Bakhsh: Veys
- Rural District: Veys

Population (2006)
  - Total: 30
- Time zone: UTC+3:30 (IRST)
  - Summer (DST): UTC+4:30 (IRDT)

Omm ol Gharib-e Kuchek (Persian: ام الغريب كوچك, also Romanized as Omm ol Gharīb-e Kūchek; also known as Omm-e Gharīb, Omm-e Gharīb-e Kūchek, Omm ol Qorb, Omm ol Qorībeh, and Umm al Gharab) is a village in Veys Rural District, Veys District, Bavi County, Khuzestan Province, Iran. As of the 2006 census its population was 30, split among seven families.
