= Nagazeh-ye Bozorg =

Nagazeh-ye Bozorg نگازه بزرگ
- Village
- Location within Iran
- Coordinates: 31°25′20″N 49°08′53″E
- Country: Iran
- Province: Khuzestan
- County: Bavi
- Bakhsh: Veys
- Rural District: Veys

Population (2006)
  - Total: 77
- Time zone: UTC+3:30 (IRST)
  - Summer (DST): UTC+4:30 (IRDT)

Nagazeh-ye Bozorg (Persian: نگازه بزرگ, also Romanized as Nagāẕeh-ye Bozorg, Naghazehé Bozorg, and Negāzeh-ye Bozorg; also known as Nagāşeh-ye Bozorg, Neqāşeh-ye Bozorg, Neqāzeh Bozorg, and Neqāzeh-ye Bozorg) is a village in Veys Rural District, Veys District, Bavi County, Khuzestan Province, Iran. At the 2006 census, its population was 77, in 11 families.
