= Gesvan =

Gesvan (Persian: گسوان) may refer to:

- Gesvan 1
- Gesvan 2
- Gesvan 3
