= Habishi =

Habishi حَبيشي (in Persian)
- village
- Location within Iran
- Coordinates: 31°32′53″N 48°59′57″E
- Country: Iran
- Province: Khuzestan
- County: Bavi
- Bakhsh: Central
- Rural District: Mollasani

Area
  - Land: 0.10 km^{2} (0.039 sq mi)
  - Urban: 0.03 km^{2} (0.012 sq mi)

Population (2006)
  - village: 59
  - Density: 590/km^{2} (1,500/sq mi)
- Time zone: UTC+3:30 (IRST)
  - Summer (DST): UTC+4:30 (IRDT)

Habishi (Persian: حَبيشي, also Romanized as Habīshī, Ḩobeyshī, and Hubaishi; also known as Ḩobeysh and Ḩobeysheh) is a village in Mollasani Rural District, in the Central District of Bavi County, Khuzestan Province, Iran. At the 2006 census, its population was 59, in 12 families.
