= Boheyr-e Olya =

Boheyr-e Olya بحيرعليا
- Village
- Location within Iran
- Coordinates: 31°42′24″N 48°55′40″E
- Country: Iran
- Province: Khuzestan
- County: Bavi
- Bakhsh: Central
- Rural District: Mollasani

Population (2006)
  - Total: 141
- Time zone: UTC+3:30 (IRST)
  - Summer (DST): UTC+4:30 (IRDT)

Boheyr-e Olya (Persian: بحيرعليا, also Romanized as Boḩeyr-e ‘Olyā) is a village in Mollasani Rural District, in the Central District of Bavi County, Khuzestan Province, Iran. At the 2006 census, its population was 141, in 28 families.
