= Salamat-Beni Halba war =

- Part of Sudanese civil war (2023–present)
Date	August 4 (Note: The exact date of the start of the war is disputed between August 4, 7, and 10.) - November 11, 2023; May 30, 2026 - present
Location	Centered around Kubum and Markondi, South Darfur, with spillovers in Central Darfur, Sudan

Belligerents
Salamat Arab militiamen: Pro-Salamat Rapid Support Forces militiamen	Beni Halba militiamen: Pro-Beni Halba Rapid Support Forces militiamen; Sudanese Armed Forces (alleged by RSF); Habbaniya militiamen (2023 only)

Casualties and losses
- 756+ civilians and fighters killed 21,000+ displaced

Since August 2023, a war has been ongoing between the Salamat tribe and the Beni Halba tribe in South Darfur, Sudan over land rights. The conflict has had several flare-ups with heavy civilian and militiamen casualties, particularly around the locality of Kubum. The first spate of the war began in August 2023 and lasted until November 2023, when local RSF and tribal elites instated a peace agreement. In May 2026, the war broke out again, leaving over 100 civilians dead.

== Background ==
The Beni Halba, a Baggara Arab tribe, are considered one of South Darfur's original historic tribes. The Salamat, meanwhile, originally came from Chad and settled in Central and South Darfur and only settled in the latter in the past few centuries. Under the traditional Darfuri hakura land patronage system, the Beni Halba have the recognized right to the land around Kubum and Edd Al Fursan. This land rights dispute has caused several issues, some violent, in past decades over water, grazing areas, and herding routes.

The Beni Halba's access to the land and subsequently political representation in the area is bolstered when the Sudanese Armed Forces are in power in South Darfur. The SAF supports Beni Halba's legitimacy over Kubum under hakura, while the Salamat are forced to pay taxes to the Beni Halba and are treated as tenants. The Rapid Support Forces back the Salamat, and through militarizing Salamat militias, have pledged to give the Salamat access to the land and political representation on it at the expense of the Beni Halba.

At the onset of the Sudanese civil war in April 2023, both tribes aligned themselves with the RSF, itself a paramilitary with support from Baggara and Rizeigat clans. Both sides sent men to fight on the frontlines against the Sudanese army elsewhere in the country, but returned to Darfur by the end of the summer. The Salamat viewed de facto RSF control and backing as a conduit to seize power and overthrow the hakura system in Beni Halba territory. Salamat tribesmen briefly clashed with the SAF and Habbaniya in late May after a looting incident sparked tensions between the two groups. At least 45 people were killed during the clashes, and a peace agreement was signed between the Salamat and Habbaniya on May 24.

ACLED noted that while the Beni Halba expressed it's support for the RSF, the Salamat did not in July.

== War ==
=== Initial clashes ===
The war between the two groups began in the first week of August 2023, (Note: Darfur24 says the war began on August 4, ACLED on August 7, and Alberdi on August 10.) when Salamat militias attacked Kubum. Over the next week, both sides began mobilizing RSF veterans from their community to attack the other, with clashes spreading to Buram and Murkondi. In the area of Umm Labassa, around 50 civilians were killed in the clashes. By August 12, Alberdi Organization reported the death toll at 123 for both sides. The market in Markondi was also looted, and after the clashes Salamat militiamen began mobilizing in Nadif and Habbaniya militiamen began mobilizing in Buram on August 18. Negotiations between both sides mediated by the Rapid Support Forces occurred on August 30. Later reports suggested that over 500 people were killed in the August clashes alone.

The next spate of violence broke out on September 7, when Salamat militiamen began attacking Markondi and torched the entire city, killing over 50 people and displacing 10,000. The RSF accused the Sudanese Army of thwarting the negotiations and inflaming the conflict, but no proof was provided. The Salamat also drove around on motorcycles and began attacking small villages near Markondi, including Adar, Damba and Delmanj. An RSF source said that over 15 villages were burnt down in the clashes. One video of the burning of Markondi, filmed by a Salamat militiaman named Saddam Ahmed Jar al-Zein, showed the fighters wearing the uniforms of the RSF. Displaced Salamat civilians fled to al-Salam, west of Nyala, and Beni Halba civilians were displaced to Rahid al-Bardi further south. Many displaced civilians who fled to Kubum, Markondi, and other areas had come from the ongoing fighting in Nyala, and were forced to flee again. Hospital sources in Nyala said that 50 wounded people had arrived in the city since the start of the tribal war.

On September 19, after intense clashes, the Salamat captured Kubum town. Musa Hilal launched his own reconciliation campaign between the two sides in Kass on September 28, with the aid of RSF second-in-command Abdulrahim Dagalo. However, these mediation efforts ultimately failed after the Beni Halba rejected Dagalo's presence. On October 8, a group of Beni Halba militiamen attacked the villages of Bindisi and Mukjar in Central Darfur, both inhabited by the Salamat. While estimates of how many people were killed are not known, sources told the Sudan Tribune that the actions of the Beni Halba were tantamount to war crimes and ethnic cleansing. These clashes included more RSF fighters who sided with the Salamat or Beni Halba. Many civilians fled to the Central African Republic and Chad.

On October 21, clashes broke out between the Salamat on one side and allied Habbaniya-Beni Halba militias in the Umm Mari, and throughout the following days expanded to the Baba area near Buram and Umm Sabikha. In Baba, 13 people were killed and many more were injured. Although casualties are not known for the battles at Umm Mari and Umm Sabikha, the fighting was reportedly very fierce. On November 15, after the RSF defeated the SAF at Buram, Habbaniya militias attacked Salamat civilians in Nadif, Buram, and Marfaeena, leaving 91 people dead, 23 injured, and many more missing. On November 11, the Beni Halba and Salamat had signed a peace agreement in Kass. Another spate of fighting between the Habbaniya and Salamat in Buram in mid-November left 10 people dead, 6,000 displaced, and many injured. In these clashes, the Salamat were supported by the RSF while the Habbaniya were supported by the SAF.

=== Peace ===
The Habbaniya and Salamat made peace in Nyala in January 2024. There was virtually no violence between the Salamat and the Habbaniya or Beni Halba between 2024 until 2026. A reconciliation agreement was signed in Mukjar, Central Darfur in June 2024. On December 29, 2025, the Salamat and Beni Halba signed a full peace agreement mediated by Hemedti, the RSF-appointed governor of South Darfur Youssef Idris, and RSF Major General Abshar Jibril Balayl. An analysis by Beam Reports showed that there were 349 confirmed casualties in Salamat-Habbaniya conflicts between June 2023 and March 2024, and 124 casualties in Salamat-Beni Halba conflicts. The Uppsala Conflict Data Program said that about 252 people were killed in 2023 between both sides, with a high of 286 and low of 164. The UCDP also said four people were killed in the Salamat-Beni Halba conflict in 2024.

=== 2026 clashes ===
The ceasefire broke apart on May 30, 2026, after the RSF administration in the area was biased along ethnic lines in conducting military mobilization and the deployment of vehicles and other necessities. The source for the clashes was allegedly when Salamat members stole cattle from the Beni Halba, and Beni Halba members chased them down. Four Beni Halba members were killed in the confrontation. Another account says that Salamat members displaced in 2023 returned to Rewina to find Beni Halba occupying their land. The fighting first began in the village of Rewina near Kubum, where anti-aircraft drones pummeled the town and many neighborhoods were burnt down. The RSF had supplied Salamat militiamen with tactical drones and reconnaissance drones, which targeted Beni Halba areas. One drone targeted the Kubum hospital on May 31, killing and injuring at least 16 civilians. A local doctor said that the drone strike had been launched from a supporter of one of the sides from Nyala. Markondi was also set ablaze. At least 100 civilians were killed in the renewed fighting. At least ten Beni Halba women were abducted by Salamat fighters. The International Organization for Migration said that 11,630 people were displaced from Kubum, Markondi, and Umm Bassa between June 4 and 6 as a result of the renewed conflict.

Despite attempts by RSF commanders Abdul Rahman Jumma and Hemedti, and Al-Hadi Idris Yahya to end the fighting, their calls had no impact on the ground. On July 4, another shooting occurred involving the Salamat and the Beni Halba in Al-Hujairat, leaving two people dead. This shooting occurred after a dispute escalated.
