= Gisvan =

Gisvan may refer to:

- Rowghani (disambiguation)
- Gesvan (disambiguation), places in Khuzestan Province
