= Nagazeh-ye Kuchak =

Nagazeh-ye Kuchak نگازه كوچك
- village
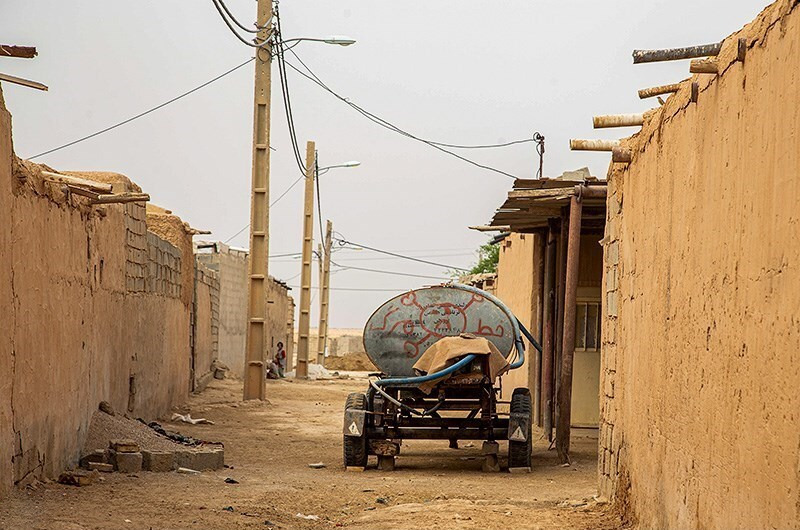

- Location within Iran
- Coordinates: 31°24′46″N 49°08′59″E
- Country: Iran
- Province: Khuzestan
- County: Bavi
- Bakhsh: Veys
- Rural District: Veys

Population (2006)
  - Total: 308
- Time zone: UTC+3:30 (IRST)
  - Summer (DST): UTC+4:30 (IRDT)

Nagazeh-ye Kuchak (Persian: نگازه كوچك, also Romanized as Nagāẕeh-ye Kūchak and Negāzeh-ye Kūchak; also known as Nagāşeh-ye Kūchek, Neqāşeh-ye Kūchek, Neqāzeh Kūchek, and Neqāzeh-ye Kūchek) is a village in Veys Rural District, Veys District, Bavi County, Khuzestan Province, Iran. At the 2006 census, its population was 308, in 38 families.
