= Zoveyr-e Kharamzeh =

Zoveyr-e Kharamzeh زويرخرامزه
- Village
- Location within Iran
- Coordinates: 31°33′50″N 48°56′16″E
- Country: Iran
- Province: Khuzestan
- County: Bavi
- Bakhsh: Central
- Rural District: Mollasani

Population (2006)
  - Total: 134
- Time zone: UTC+3:30 (IRST)
  - Summer (DST): UTC+4:30 (IRDT)

Zoveyr-e Kharamzeh (Persian: زويرخرامزه, also Romanized as Zoveyr-e Kharāmzeh; also known as Kharamza and Kharmazeh) is a village in Mollasani Rural District, in the Central District of Bavi County, Khuzestan Province, Iran. At the 2006 census, its population was 134, in 24 families.
