= Shahrak-e Taleqani, Bavi =

Shahrak-e Taleqani شهرك طالقاني
- Village
- Location within Iran
- Coordinates: 31°23′50″N 48°47′47″E
- Country: Iran
- Province: Khuzestan
- County: Bavi
- Bakhsh: Veys
- Rural District: Veys

Population (2006)
  - Total: 2,298
- Time zone: UTC+3:30 (IRST)
  - Summer (DST): UTC+4:30 (IRDT)

Shahrak-e Taleqani (Persian: شهرك طالقاني, also Romanized as Shahrak-e Ţāleqānī) is a village in Veys Rural District, Veys District, Bavi County, Khuzestan Province, Iran. At the 2006 census, its population was 2,298, in 373 families.
