= Seyyed Sharif, Bavi =

Seyyed Sharif سيدشريف
- Village
- Location within Iran
- Coordinates: 31°27′45″N 48°49′15″E
- Country: Iran
- Province: Khuzestan
- County: Bavi
- Bakhsh: Veys
- Rural District: Veys

Population (2006)
  - Total: 431
- Time zone: UTC+3:30 (IRST)
  - Summer (DST): UTC+4:30 (IRDT)

Seyyed Sharif (Persian: سيدشريف, also Romanized as Seyyed Sharīf; also known as Kūt-e Seyyed Sharīf) is a village in Veys Rural District, Veys District, Bavi County, Khuzestan Province, Iran. At the 2006 census, its population was 431, in 67 families.
