= Hobeysh =

Hobeysh حبيش (in Persian)
- Village
- Location within Iran
- Coordinates: 31°24′01″N 49°06′17″E
- Country: Iran
- Province: Khuzestan
- County: Bavi
- Bakhsh: Veys
- Rural District: Veys

Population (2006)
  - Total: 47
- Time zone: UTC+3:30 (IRST)
  - Summer (DST): UTC+4:30 (IRDT)

Hobeysh (Persian: حُبيش, also Romanized as Ḩobeysh; also known as 'Salmān' (Persian: سَلمان) is a village located in the Veys Rural District, of the Veys District, Bavi County, Khuzestan Province, Iran. According to the 2006 census, the population was 47 residents living in 7 families.
