= Tall Bumeh =

Village in Khuzestan province, Iran

Tall Bumeh Persian: تل بومه
- Village
- Location within Iran
- Coordinates: 31°31′36″N 48°55′28″E
- Country: Iran
- Province: Khuzestan
- County: Bavi
- District: Central
- Rural District: Mollasani

Population (2016)
  - Total: 1,206
- Time zone: UTC+3:30 (IRST)

Tall Bumeh (Persian: تل بومه) (Note: Also romanized as Tal Būmeh, Tall Būmeh, and Tall-e Būmeh; also known as Tel Būma and Zūair) is a village in Mollasani Rural District of the Central District of Bavi County, Khuzestan province, Iran.

== Demographics ==
=== Population ===
At the time of the 2006 National Census, the village's population was 1,010 in 144 households, when it was in the former Bavi District of Ahvaz County). The following census in 2011 counted 1,139 people in 253 households, by which time the district had been separated from the county in the establishment of Bavi County. The rural district was transferred to the new Central District. The 2016 census measured the population of the village as 1,206 people in 307 households. It was the most populous village in its rural district.
