= Bovirdeh Salamat =

Bovirdeh Salamat بويرده سلامات
- Village
- Location within Iran
- Coordinates: 31°23′20″N 48°54′36″E
- Country: Iran
- Province: Khuzestan
- County: Bavi
- Bakhsh: Veys
- Rural District: Veys

Population (2006)
  - Total: 221
- Time zone: UTC+3:30 (IRST)
  - Summer (DST): UTC+4:30 (IRDT)

Bovirdeh Salamat (Persian: بويرده سلامات, also Romanized as Bovīrdeh Salāmat; also known as Bard-i-Salāmat, Bovair Deh, Boveyr Deh-e Salāmāt, Boveyr Deh Salāmat, Salāmat, and Salāmāt Boveyrdeh) is a village in Veys Rural District, Veys District, Bavi County, Khuzestan Province, Iran. At the 2006 census, its population was 221, in 35 families.
