= Honeyri-ye Yek =

Honeyri-ye Yek حنيري يك
- Village
- Location within Iran
- Coordinates: 31°30′07″N 49°03′37″E
- Country: Iran
- Province: Khuzestan
- County: Bavi
- Bakhsh: Central
- Rural District: Mollasani

Population (2006)
  - Total: 131
- Time zone: UTC+3:30 (IRST)
  - Summer (DST): UTC+4:30 (IRDT)

Honeyri-ye Yek (Persian: حنيري يك, also Romanized as Honeyrī-ye Yek; also known as Haneyrī and Homaireh) is a village in Mollasani Rural District, in the Central District of Bavi County, Khuzestan Province, Iran. At the 2006 census, its population was 131, in 25 families.
