= Hobeish =

Hobeish (Arabic: حُبَيْش, romanized: Ḥubaysh) may refer to:

- Hobeysh, a village in Veys Rural District, Veys District, Bavi County, Khuzestan Province, Iran
- Habishi, a village in Mollasani Rural District, in the Central District of Bavi County
- Jabal Hubaysh (disambiguation), several mountains

== See also ==
- Habishi (disambiguation)
