= Zargan Rural District =

Rural district in Khuzestan province, Iran

Zargan Rural District Persian: دهستان زرگان
- Rural District
- Location within Iran
- Coordinates: 31°23′54″N 48°53′52″E
- Country: Iran
- Province: Khuzestan
- County: Bavi
- District: Veys
- Capital: Zargan ol Basreh

Population (2016)
  - Total: 8,677
- Time zone: UTC+3:30 (IRST)

Zargan Rural District (Persian: دهستان زرگان) is in Veys District of Bavi County, Khuzestan province, Iran. Its capital is the village of Zargan ol Basreh.

== History ==
After the National Census of 2006, Bavi District was separated from Ahvaz County in the establishment of Bavi County, and Zargan Rural District was created in the new Veys District.

== Demographics ==
=== Population ===
At the time of the 2011 census, the rural district's population was 14,141 in 3,358 households. The 2016 census measured the population of the rural district as 8,677 in 2,282 households. The most populous of its 30 villages was Kut-e Seyyed Soltan, with 1,523 people.
