= Demographics of the Central African Republic =

Demographics of Central African Republic
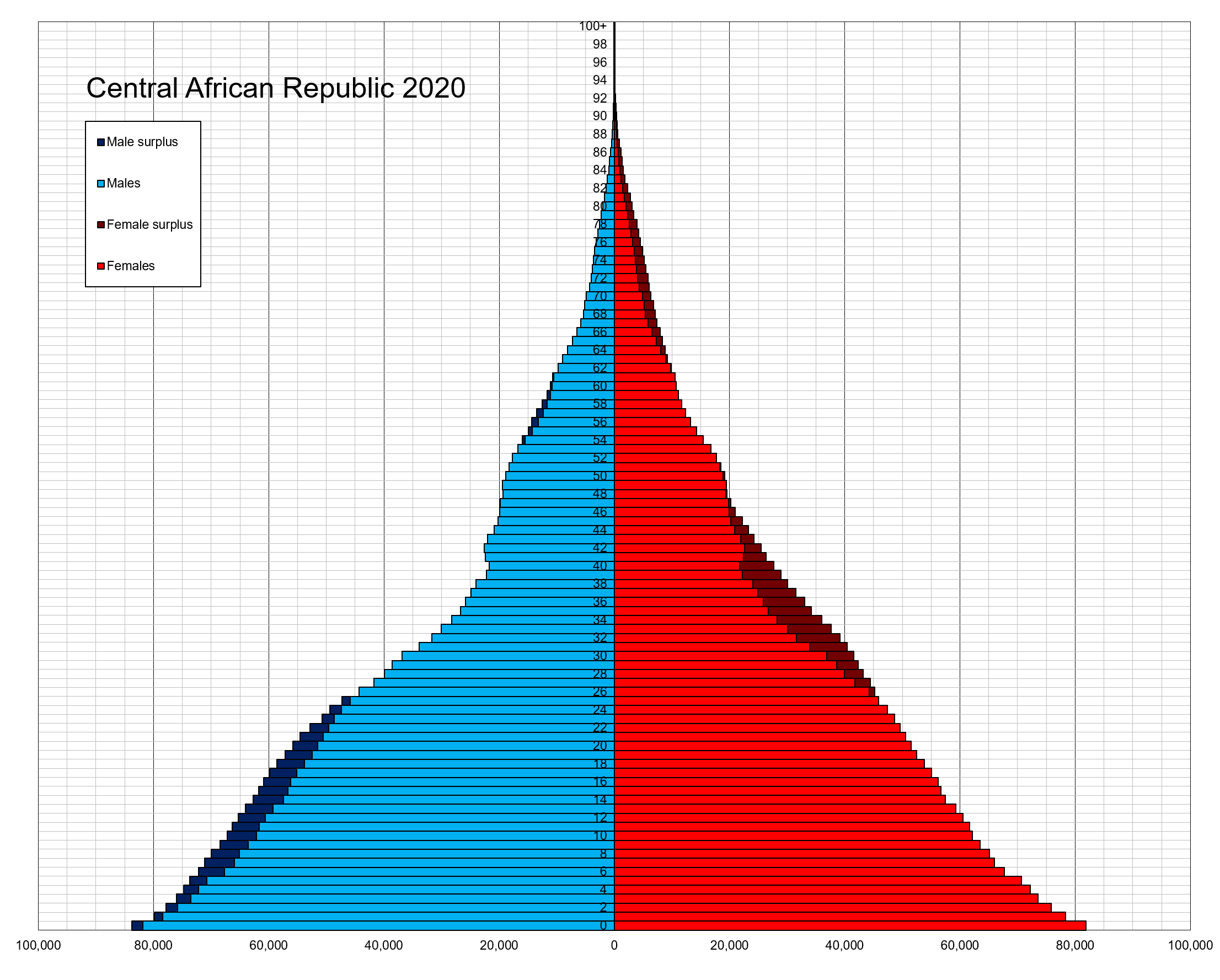
- Population pyramid of the Central African Republic in 2020
- Population: 5,454,533 (2022 est.)
- Growth rate: 2.28% (2022 est.)
- Birth rate: 45.4 births/1,000 population (2025 est.)
- Death rate: 9.3 deaths/1,000 population (2025 est.)
- Life expectancy: 55.52 years
  - male: 54.19 years
  - female: 56.88 years
- Fertility rate: 5.81 children born/woman (2025 est.)
- Infant mortality: 82.97 deaths/1,000 live births
- Net migration rate: -3.22 migrant(s)/1,000 population (2022 est.)

Age structure
- 0–14 years: 39.49%
- 65 and over: 3.35%

Sex ratio
- Total: 0.99 male(s)/female (2022 est.)
- At birth: 1.03 male(s)/female
- Under 15: 1.05 male(s)/female
- 65 and over: 0.64 male(s)/female

Nationality
- Nationality: Central African

Language
- Official: French

Demographic features of the population of the Central African Republic include population density, ethnicity, education level, health of the populace, economic status, religious affiliations and other aspects of the population.

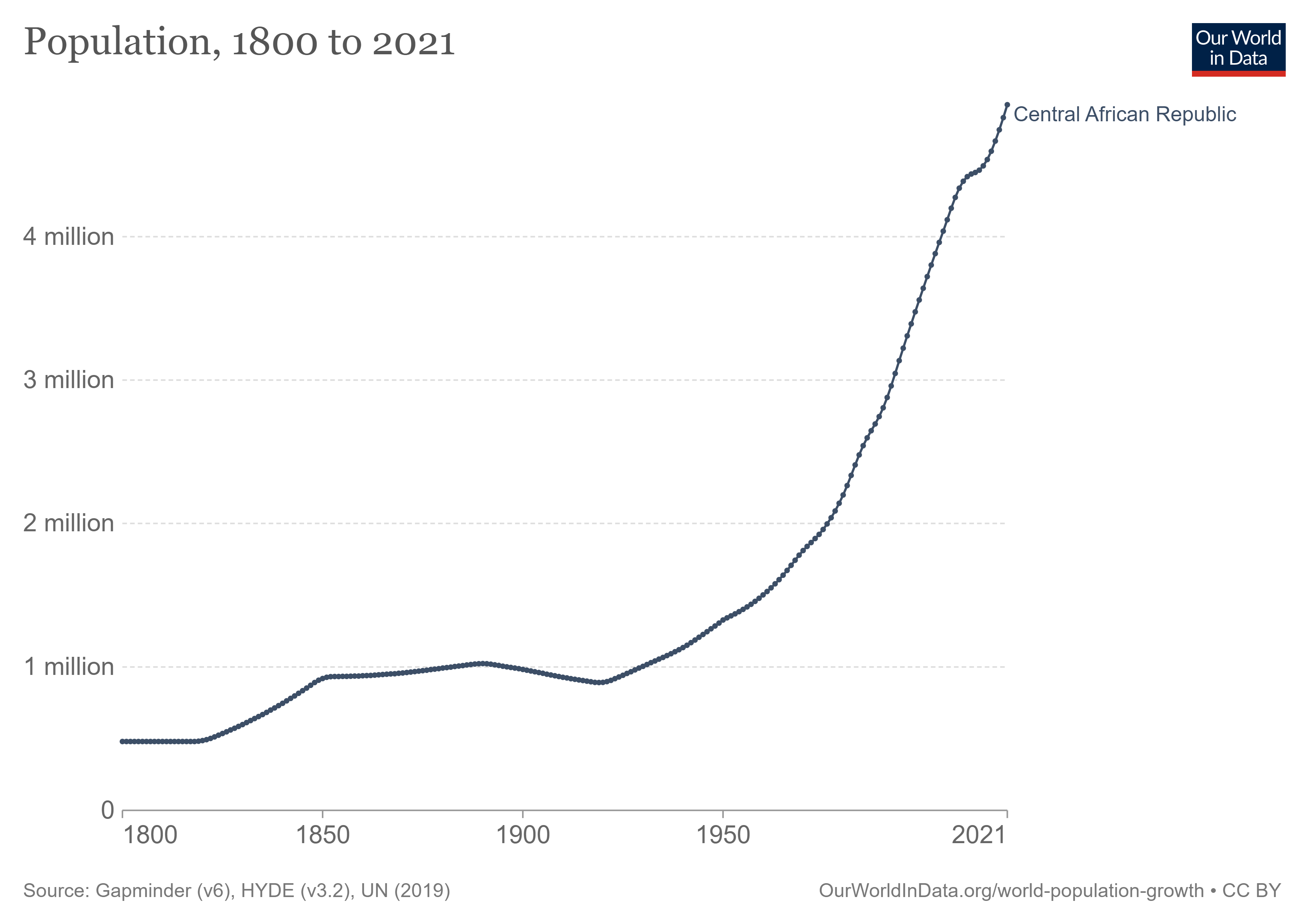
Demographics of Central African Republic, Data of Our World in Data, year 2022.

There are more than 80 ethnic groups in the Central African Republic (CAR), each with its own language. The largest ethnic groups are Gbaya (Baya) 28.8%, Banda 22.9%, Mandjia 9.9%, Sara 7.9%, M'Baka-Bantu 7.9%, Arab-Fulani (Peuhl) 6%, Mbum 6%, Ngbanki 5.5%, Zande-Nzakara 3%, other Central African Republic ethnic groups 2%, non-Central African Republic ethnic groups .1%, as of 2003. Sangho, the language of a small group along the Oubangui River, is the national language spoken by the majority of Central Africans. Only a small part of the population has more than an elemental knowledge of French, the official language.

More than 55% of the population of the CAR lives in rural areas. The chief agricultural areas are around the Bossangoa and Bambari. Bangui, Berberati, Bangassou, and Bossangoa are the most densely populated urban centers.

== Population ==
According to the 2022 revision of the World Population Prospects the total population was 5,457,154 in 2021, compared to only 1 327 000 in 1950. The proportion of children below the age of 15 in 2010 was 40.4%, 55.6% were between 15 and 65 years of age, while 4% were 65 years or older.

Population by age group
Year	Total	0–14 (%)	15–64 (%)	65+ (%)
1950	1 327 000	36.2	58.7	5.1
1955	1 399 000	37.0	58.3	4.7
1960	1 504 000	38.2	57.5	4.3
1965	1 649 000	39.6	56.2	4.2
1970	1 829 000	40.6	55.3	4.1
1975	2 017 000	41.7	54.2	4.1
1980	2 274 000	42.2	53.6	4.1
1985	2 627 000	42.4	53.6	4.0
1990	2 935 000	43.2	52.8	4.0
1995	3 328 000	42.5	53.5	4.0
2000	3 702 000	42.0	54.0	3.9
2005	4 018 000	41.6	54.5	4.0
2010	4 401 000	40.4	55.6	4.0
2015	4 410 000	40.8	55.8	4.0

== Vital statistics ==
Registration of vital events is not complete in the Central African Republic. The Population Department of the United Nations prepared the following estimates.

	Mid-year population	Live births	Deaths	Natural change	CBR (Note: CBR = crude birth rate (per 1000); CDR = crude death rate (per 1000); NC = natural change (per 1000); TFR = total fertility rate (number of children per woman); IMR = infant mortality rate per 1000 births)	CDR	NC	TFR	IMR	Life expectancy (years)
1950	1,437,000	63,000	42,000	20,000	43.6	29.5	14.0	5.74	190.7	35.39
1951	1,457,000	63,000	43,000	21,000	43.5	29.4	14.1	5.75	189.7	35.59
1952	1,478,000	64,000	43,000	21,000	43.5	29.0	14.5	5.76	187.5	36.00
1953	1,500,000	65,000	43,000	22,000	43.4	28.6	14.8	5.76	185.4	36.40
1954	1,522,000	66,000	43,000	23,000	43.3	28.2	15.2	5.77	183.3	36.80
1955	1,546,000	67,000	43,000	24,000	43.3	27.7	15.6	5.78	181.3	37.19
1956	1,570,000	68,000	43,000	25,000	43.2	27.3	15.9	5.78	179.3	37.58
1957	1,596,000	69,000	43,000	26,000	43.2	26.8	16.4	5.79	177.3	37.97
1958	1,623,000	70,000	43,000	27,000	43.0	26.4	16.7	5.80	175.3	38.35
1959	1,650,000	71,000	43,000	28,000	43.0	25.9	17.0	5.81	173.3	38.74
1960	1,680,000	72,000	43,000	29,000	42.9	25.4	17.5	5.81	170.5	39.24
1961	1,710,000	73,000	43,000	31,000	42.9	24.9	18.0	5.83	167.8	39.74
1962	1,743,000	75,000	43,000	32,000	43.0	24.4	18.6	5.85	164.9	40.26
1963	1,776,000	76,000	42,000	34,000	43.0	23.9	19.1	5.87	162.0	40.78
1964	1,812,000	78,000	42,000	36,000	43.3	23.4	19.9	5.91	158.9	41.35
1965	1,849,000	80,000	42,000	38,000	43.4	22.9	20.6	5.94	155.8	41.93
1966	1,889,000	83,000	42,000	40,000	43.8	22.4	21.4	5.98	152.6	42.53
1967	1,931,000	85,000	42,000	43,000	44.0	21.9	22.1	6.02	149.4	43.16
1968	1,975,000	87,000	42,000	45,000	44.3	21.4	22.9	6.06	146.2	43.80
1969	2,022,000	89,000	42,000	47,000	44.1	20.9	23.2	6.04	143.2	44.44
1970	2,067,000	90,000	42,000	48,000	43.7	20.3	23.4	6.00	140.3	45.07
1971	2,111,000	92,000	42,000	50,000	43.5	19.8	23.7	5.99	137.6	45.69
1972	2,154,000	93,000	42,000	51,000	43.1	19.2	23.8	5.96	135.1	46.29
1973	2,196,000	94,000	41,000	53,000	42.6	18.7	23.9	5.93	132.8	46.85
1974	2,239,000	95,000	41,000	54,000	42.3	18.3	24.0	5.91	130.6	47.40
1975	2,284,000	96,000	41,000	55,000	41.9	17.8	24.1	5.89	128.5	47.91
1976	2,318,000	98,000	41,000	57,000	42.0	17.5	24.5	5.93	126.6	48.40
1977	2,342,000	100,000	41,000	60,000	42.4	17.2	25.2	5.97	124.8	48.84
1978	2,366,000	103,000	41,000	62,000	43.0	17.0	26.0	6.02	123.0	49.24
1979	2,390,000	105,000	41,000	65,000	43.6	16.8	26.8	6.07	121.4	49.60
1980	2,415,000	107,000	41,000	67,000	44.1	16.7	27.4	6.11	120.0	49.89
1981	2,441,000	110,000	41,000	69,000	44.6	16.5	28.1	6.14	118.8	50.16
1982	2,468,000	112,000	41,000	71,000	44.9	16.4	28.5	6.14	117.8	50.30
1983	2,495,000	114,000	41,000	73,000	45.2	16.3	28.9	6.12	117.0	50.42
1984	2,524,000	116,000	41,000	75,000	45.5	16.3	29.3	6.11	116.3	50.48
1985	2,553,000	118,000	42,000	77,000	45.9	16.2	29.7	6.11	115.7	50.52
1986	2,584,000	120,000	42,000	78,000	46.2	16.1	30.0	6.09	115.1	50.49
1987	2,616,000	123,000	42,000	80,000	46.5	16.1	30.4	6.10	114.7	50.41
1988	2,657,000	124,000	43,000	81,000	46.5	16.1	30.4	6.08	114.5	50.24
1989	2,724,000	127,000	44,000	83,000	46.5	16.1	30.5	6.06	114.7	49.99
1990	2,809,000	130,000	45,000	85,000	46.3	16.1	30.2	6.05	115.0	49.64
1991	2,898,000	133,000	47,000	86,000	46.0	16.1	29.8	6.03	115.2	49.25
1992	2,992,000	136,000	48,000	87,000	45.4	16.2	29.2	5.98	115.1	48.79
1993	3,089,000	139,000	50,000	88,000	44.9	16.3	28.7	5.94	114.7	48.35
1994	3,188,000	142,000	52,000	90,000	44.5	16.4	28.1	5.93	114.3	47.85
1995	3,277,000	146,000	54,000	92,000	44.5	16.6	27.9	5.97	113.8	47.35
1996	3,364,000	149,000	56,000	92,000	44.3	16.8	27.5	5.99	113.4	46.83
1997	3,458,000	151,000	59,000	93,000	43.8	17.0	26.8	5.96	112.8	46.32
1998	3,555,000	155,000	61,000	94,000	43.5	17.1	26.4	5.93	112.2	46.03
1999	3,655,000	159,000	63,000	96,000	43.4	17.2	26.2	5.93	111.4	45.75
2000	3,759,000	162,000	65,000	97,000	43.3	17.3	25.9	5.92	111.0	45.41
2001	3,845,000	165,000	67,000	99,000	42.8	17.2	25.6	5.85	110.1	45.39
2002	3,931,000	167,000	67,000	100,000	42.6	17.2	25.5	5.84	109.1	45.41
2003	4,027,000	173,000	68,000	104,000	42.8	16.9	25.9	5.85	108.1	45.76
2004	4,115,000	175,000	69,000	107,000	42.5	16.7	25.9	5.83	107.2	46.04
2005	4,209,000	180,000	69,000	111,000	42.6	16.4	26.3	5.85	106.2	46.43
2006	4,294,000	185,000	69,000	115,000	42.8	16.1	26.7	5.87	104.8	46.85
2007	4,376,000	188,000	69,000	119,000	42.8	15.7	27.1	5.89	103.4	47.43
2008	4,467,000	192,000	69,000	124,000	42.9	15.3	27.6	5.91	101.7	48.02
2009	4,565,000	197,000	68,000	129,000	43.0	14.9	28.1	5.92	99.5	48.65
2010	4,660,000	202,000	68,000	134,000	43.2	14.5	28.7	5.94	97.3	49.26
2011	4,732,000	206,000	67,000	139,000	43.2	14.1	29.1	5.96	94.7	49.95
2012	4,773,000	208,000	66,000	142,000	43.0	13.6	29.4	6.01	92.1	50.69
2013	4,802,000	206,000	65,000	141,000	42.4	13.4	29.0	6.02	89.9	50.90
2014	4,799,000	205,000	66,000	139,000	41.9	13.5	28.4	6.02	89.1	50.57
2015	4,819,000	199,000	59,000	140,000	41.0	12.2	28.9	6.04	84.7	52.79
2016	4,904,000	203,000	58,000	145,000	41.2	11.7	29.5	6.04	81.6	53.46
2017	4,997,000	209,000	58,000	151,000	41.6	11.5	30.1	6.05	79.3	53.72
2018	5,095,000	214,000	58,000	157,000	41.8	11.2	30.6	6.04	77.4	54.37
2019	5,209,000	219,000	57,000	162,000	41.9	10.9	31.0	6.01	74.6	55.03
2020	5,343,000	226,000	59,000	167,000	42.2	11.0	31.1	5.99	72.4	54.60
2021	5,457,000	235,000	63,000	172,000	42.7	11.4	31.3	5.98	71.4	53.90
2022					45.4	55.1				
6.02										
2023					46.4	9.4	36.9	6.01		
2024					46.2	9.4	36.8	5.95		
2025					45.4	9.3	36.1	5.81		

Source: UN DESA, World Population Prospects, 2022

View source data.
View source data.
View source data.
View source data.

=== Fertility ===
Total Fertility Rate (TFR) (Wanted Fertility Rate) and Crude Birth Rate (CBR):

Year	CBR (Total)	TFR (Total)	CBR (Urban)	TFR (Urban)	CBR (Rural)	TFR (Rural)
1994–95	38,0	5,07 (4,7)	37,9	4,86 (4,3)	37,9	5,23 (5,0)

Years	1925	1926	1927	1928	1929	1930	1931	1932	1933	1934
Total Fertility Rate in Central African Republic	6.51	6.46	6.42	6.38	6.33	6.29	6.24	6.20	6.15	6.11

Years	1935	1936	1937	1938	1939	1940	1941	1942	1943	1944
Total Fertility Rate in Central African Republic	6.07	6.02	5.98	5.93	5.89	5.85	5.80	5.76	5.71	5.67

Years	1945	1946	1947	1948	1949
Total Fertility Rate in Central African Republic	5.62	5.58	5.54	5.49	5.45

=== Life expectancy ===
Period	Life expectancy in Years
1950–1955	33.44
1955–1960	▲35.50
1960–1965	▲37.57
1965–1970	▲40.16
1970–1975	▲43.90
1975–1980	▲47.62
1980–1985	▲49.56
1985–1990	▼49.49
1990–1995	▼47.65
1995–2000	▼44.96
2000–2005	▼43.68
2005–2010	▲45.99
2010–2015	▲49.40

Population, fertility rate and net reproduction rate, United Nations estimates

== Ethnic groups ==
An approximate distribution of the ethnic groups is shown in the chart below:

Ethnic groups in Central African Republic
Ethnic group	Percentage	Population
Baggara Arabs	2.4%	107,000
Salamate commerçant	1.9%	87,000
Baka	0.5%	20,000
Banda	27%	1,190,700
Bayaka	?	?
Fula	4.5%	250,000
Gbaya	33%	1,300,000
Kara	2.3%	100,000
Kresh	?	?
Mbaka	4%	176,400
Mandja	13%	573,300
Ngbandi	?	?
Sara	10%	441,000
Vidiri	?	?
Wodaabe	2.3%	100,000
Yakoma	4%	176,400
Yulu	?	?
Zande	1.4%	62,000
Others	?	?

== Languages ==
Sango (lingua franca and official language), French (official), tribal languages

== Religion ==
Religion in the Central African Republic 2020
Roman Catholic	60.5%
Protestant	28.4%
Islam	8.5%
Traditional religions	1%
other	2%

Christian 89%, Muslim 9%, folk religionist 1%, unaffiliated 1% (2020 est.)

Animistic beliefs and practices strongly influence the Christian majority

== See also ==
- Demographics of Africa
- List of ethnic groups of Africa
