= Tashkuh (mountain) =

Perpetually burning slopes in Iran

Coordinates: 31°16′40.76″N 49°48′30.88″E

Tashkuh (Persian: تشکوه) (Note: Also romanized as Tashkooh; English: "fire mountain," commonly translated as Mount Fire or Fiery Mount) is a perpetually burning hillside northeast of the city of Ramhormoz, Ramhormoz County, Khuzestan province, in the southwest of Iran. The seeping of hydrocarbon gas through small fissures in the ground fuels the patchwork of perpetual flames clustered along the hillside.

== See also ==
- Yanar Dag, a perpetually burning hillside in neighboring Azerbaijan
