= Salamat =

Salamat may refer to:

== Music ==
- Salamat (album), a 2007 album by Yeng Constantino
  - "Salamat" (Yeng Constantino song), its title track
- "Salamat" (The Dawn song)
- Salamat (Hori7on song)

== Places ==
- Salamat, Bavi, a village in Khuzestan Province, Iran
- Salamat, Behbahan, a village in Khuzestan Province, Iran
- Salamat, Shushtar, a village in Khuzestan Province, Iran
- Salamat, West Azerbaijan, Iran
- Salamat Prefecture, a prefecture of Chad
- Salamat Region, a region of Chad

== Other ==
- Bahr Salamat, a river in Chad
- HC Salamat, a Finnish ice hockey team
