= Liberation of Susangerd =

1980 operation during the Iran–Iraq War

Susangerd operation
- Part of Iran–Iraq War
| Date | 17 November 1980 |
| Location | Susangerd, Khuzestan, Iran |
| Result | Iranian victory |
| Territorial changes | Iran recaptures Susangerd |

Belligerents
| Iraq: Iraqi Armed Forces | Iran: Islamic Republic of Iran Army; Islamic Revolutionary Guard Corps |

Liberation of Susangerd (also known as "Susangerd-Operation") was a military operation during Iran-Iraq War, which was commenced on 19 November 1980 by the common command of Islamic Republic of Iran Army and Islamic Revolutionary Guard Corps and "Irregular Forces Headquarters". This operation's goal was to save Susangard city from the danger of a certain fall.

At the operation of Susangerd There were 24 pilots who participated in the operation, and some of them were killed, namely:

- Houshang Kiyan Ara
- Seyyed Mohammad-Taqi Hosseini
- Mohammad Kam-Bakhsh Ziyaei
- Nematollah Akbari Samani
- Younes Khosh-Bin
- Ebrahim Omid-Bakhsh

The list of the pilots (of F-5/F-14) who took part in Susangerd-operation, is as follows:

- Davoud Sadeqi
- Mahmoud Naeimi
- Shir-Afkan Hemmati
- Jalal Aram
- Parviz Nasri
- Behnam Qanamiyan
- Ahmad Mehr-Niya
- Seyyed Esmaeil Mousavi
- Siyavash Moshiri
- Habibollah Baqaei
- Davoud Salman
- Qasem Mohammad Amini
- Iraj Osareh
- Akbar Tavangariyan
- Mohammad Masbouq
- Reza Ramezani
- Fazlollah Javid-Niya
- Davoud Asgari

Eventually, at Susangerd operation, Iranian forces broke the siege of the city, and rejected the Iraqis forces.

== See also ==
- Liberation of Khorramshahr
