= Sheyban, Iran =

City in Khuzestan province, Iran

Sheyban Persian: شیبان
- City
- Location within Iran
- Coordinates: 31°24′22″N 48°47′40″E
- Country: Iran
- Province: Khuzestan
- County: Bavi
- District: Veys

Population (2016)
  - Total: 36,374
- Time zone: UTC+3:30 (IRST)

Sheyban (Persian: شیبان) (Note: Also romanized as Sheybān; also known as Sheybāni) is a city in Veys District of Bavi County, Khuzestan province, Iran.

== Demographics ==
=== Population ===
At the time of the 2006 National Census, the city's population was 23,211 in 4,063 households, when it was in the former Bavi District of Ahvaz County). The following census in 2011 counted 24,968 people in 1,783 households, by which time the district had been separated from the county in the establishment of Bavi County. Sheyban was transferred to the new Veys District. The 2016 census measured the population of the city as 36,374 people in 9,637 households.
