= Jabal Hubaysh =

Jabal Ḥubaysh (Arabic: جَبَل حُبَيْش), or Jabal Hobeish may refer to the following mountains:

- Jabal Hubaysh, Saudi Arabia of the Midian range in Tabuk Region, Saudi Arabia
- Jabal Hubaysh, Yemen of the Sarawat range in Ibb Province, Yemen

== See also ==
- Hobeish (disambiguation)
