= Rowghani =

Rowghani (Persian: روغني) may refer to:

- Rowghani, Markazi
- Rowghani, Sistan and Baluchestan
- Rowghani, South Khorasan
