= Khuzestan Premier League =

- Founded: 2000
- Country: Iran
- Confederation: AFC
- Number of clubs: 16
- Level on pyramid: 4
- Promotion to: 3rd Division
- Relegation to: Khuzestan League One
- Domestic cup: Hazfi Cup
- Current champions: Eftekhar Shooshtar (2018-19)
- Website: Website
- Current: 2021–22 Khuzestan Premier League

The Khuzestan Premier League is the premier football league of Khuzestan province and the fifth-highest in the Iranian football pyramid after the 3rd Division. Prior to the 2017-18 season, the league maintained 14 teams, however beginning with the 2017-18 season, 16 teams compete in one group with the winner of the league being promoted to the 3rd Division and the last place team getting relegated to the Khuzestan Division 1 League.

== Format ==
In the past, the number of teams has fluctuated. Prior to the 2017-18 season, the league comprised 14 teams. However, since then, the league has expanded to 16 teams. At the end of the season, the club with the most points becomes the champion of the league. The Champion gets promoted to the 3rd Division League while the bottom team is relegated to the Khuzestan League 1.

== 2019–20 season ==
The 2019-20 season marks the 20th season of the Khuzestan premier League and will begin in August 2019 with 16 teams from across the Khuzestan province.

== Champions ==
Season	Champion	Notes
?	Foolad Khuzestan	Ahvaz City League Champion
?	Foolad Khuzestan	Ahvaz City League Champion
?	Foolad Khuzestan	Ahvaz City League Champion
?	Foolad Khuzestan	Khuzestan League Champion
?	Foolad Khuzestan	Khuzestan League Champion
?	Foolad Khuzestan	Khuzestan League Champion
	Foolad Khuzestan	City League Champion
	Foolad Khuzestan	Khuzestan League Champion
	Foolad Khuzestan	Khuzestan League Champion

Year	Winner	Runners-up	Third-Place	Reference
2000-2001				
2001–2002				
2002–2003				
2003–2004				
2004–2005				
2005–2006				
2006–2007				
2007–2008				
2008–2009				
2009–2010				
2010–2011				
2011–2012	Siman Behbahan	Piruzi Mahshahr	Esteghlal Ramhormoz	
2012–2013	Farhang Ramhormoz	Esteghlal Molasani	Jonub Susangerd	
2013–2014	Naftun Masjedsoleiman	Esteghlal Shush	Parsian Shushtar	
2014–2015	Esteghlal Shushtar	Jonub Susangerd	Shardari Shams Abad	
2015–2016	Persepolis Shush	Esteghlal Ramhormoz	Esteghlal Khoramshahr	
2016–2017	Esteghlal Ramshir	Sepahan Izeh	Shahin Dezab	
2017–2018	Esteghlal Novin Mahshahr	Persepolis Novin Dezful	Jonub Susangerd	
2018–2019	Eftekhar Shushtar	Etehad Safi Abad Dezful	Parsa Bagh-e malek	
