= Khazineh =

Khazineh خزينه
- Village
- Location within Iran
- Coordinates: 31°44′36″N 49°03′33″E
- Country: Iran
- Province: Khuzestan
- County: Shushtar
- Bakhsh: Central
- Rural District: Shahid Modarres

Population (2006)
  - Total: 576
- Time zone: UTC+3:30 (IRST)
  - Summer (DST): UTC+4:30 (IRDT)

Khazineh (Persian: خزينه, also Romanized as Khazīneh; also known as Salāmāt and Salāmāt Khazīneh) is a village in Shahid Modarres Rural District, in the Central District of Shushtar County, Khuzestan Province, Iran. At the 2006 census, its population was 576, in 80 families.
