= Boheyr-e Do =

Boheyr-e Do بحيردو
- Village
- Location within Iran
- Coordinates: 31°34′41″N 48°52′31″E
- Country: Iran
- Province: Khuzestan
- County: Ahvaz
- Bakhsh: Central
- Rural District: Anaqcheh

Population (2006)
  - Total: 229
- Time zone: UTC+3:30 (IRST)
  - Summer (DST): UTC+4:30 (IRDT)

Boheyr-e Do (Persian: بحيردو) is a village in Anaqcheh Rural District, in the Central District of Ahvaz County, Khuzestan Province, Iran. At the 2006 census, its population was 229, in 47 families.
