= Shahrak-e Taleqani, Mahshahr =

Shahrak-e Taleqani شهرك طالقاني
- Village
- Location within Iran
- Coordinates: 30°35′29″N 49°09′51″E
- Country: Iran
- Province: Khuzestan
- County: Mahshahr
- Bakhsh: Central
- Rural District: Jarahi

Population (2006)
  - Total: 25,808
- Time zone: UTC+3:30 (IRST)
  - Summer (DST): UTC+4:30 (IRDT)

Shahrak-e Taleqani (Persian: شهرك طالقاني, also Romanized as Shahrak-e Ţāleqānī) is a village in Jarahi Rural District, in the Central District of Mahshahr County, Khuzestan Province, Iran. At the 2006 census, its population was 25,808, in 4,700 families.
