= Kubum =

Locality in South Darfur State, Sudan

Kubum كوبوم
- Location within Sudan
- Coordinates: 11°45′48″N 23°47′24″E
- Country: Sudan
- State: South Darfur

Government
  - Type: locality
- Time zone: UTC+2 (CAT)

Kubum (Arabic: كوبوم) is a locality in South Darfur, Sudan.

== History ==
In the 2023 Sudan war, the Rapid Support Forces were accused of war crimes in the area. The area has been plagued by tribal violence. Six months into the conflict it was reported that clashes between the Salamat and Beni Halba militias in Kubum resulted in over half of all recorded fatalities in the entire state.
