= Shahrak-e Taleqani, Izeh =

Shahrak-e Taleqani شهرك طالقاني
- Village
- Location within Iran
- Coordinates: 31°47′13″N 49°46′37″E
- Country: Iran
- Province: Khuzestan
- County: Izeh
- Bakhsh: Central
- Rural District: Holayjan

Population (2006)
  - Total: 207
- Time zone: UTC+3:30 (IRST)
  - Summer (DST): UTC+4:30 (IRDT)

Shahrak-e Taleqani (Persian: شهرك طالقاني, also Romanized as Shahrak-e Ţāleqānī) is a village in Holayjan Rural District, in the Central District of Izeh County, Khuzestan Province, Iran. At the 2006 census, its population was 207, in 38 families.
