= Kut-e Said =

Kut-e Said كوت سعيد
- Village
- Location within Iran
- Coordinates: 30°21′19″N 48°12′08″E
- Country: Iran
- Province: Khuzestan
- County: Khorramshahr
- Bakhsh: Minu
- Rural District: Jazireh-ye Minu

Population (2006)
  - Total: 441
- Time zone: UTC+3:30 (IRST)
  - Summer (DST): UTC+4:30 (IRDT)

Kut-e Said (Persian: كوت سعيد, also Romanized as Kūt-e Sa‘īd; also known as Kūt-e Seyyed) is a village in Jazireh-ye Minu Rural District, Minu District, Khorramshahr County, Khuzestan Province, Iran. At the 2006 census, its population was 441, in 84 families.
