= Shahrak-e Taleqani, Fars =

Shahrak-e Taleqani شهرك طالقاني
- Village
- Location within Iran
- Coordinates: 30°01′00″N 52°42′05″E
- Country: Iran
- Province: Fars
- County: Marvdasht
- Bakhsh: Central
- Rural District: Ramjerd-e Yek

Population (2006)
  - Total: 479
- Time zone: UTC+3:30 (IRST)
  - Summer (DST): UTC+4:30 (IRDT)

Shahrak-e Taleqani (Persian: شهرك طالقاني, also Romanized as Shahrak-e Ţāleqānī) is a village in Ramjerd-e Yek Rural District, in the Central District of Marvdasht County, Fars province, Iran. At the 2006 census, its population was 479, in 109 families.
