= Boheyr-e Yek =

Boheyr-e Yek بحيريك
- Village
- Location within Iran
- Coordinates: 31°34′18″N 48°52′30″E
- Country: Iran
- Province: Khuzestan
- County: Ahvaz
- Bakhsh: Central
- Rural District: Anaqcheh

Population (2006)
  - Total: 179
- Time zone: UTC+3:30 (IRST)
  - Summer (DST): UTC+4:30 (IRDT)

Boheyr-e Yek (Persian: بحيريك; also known as Beḩor, Bohair, Boher, and Būḩer) is a village in Anaqcheh Rural District, in the Central District of Ahvaz County, Khuzestan Province, Iran. At the 2006 census, its population was 179, in 36 families.
