= Jaaveleh =

Jaaveleh جعاوله
- Village
- Location within Iran
- Coordinates: 31°41′21″N 48°40′11″E
- Country: Iran
- Province: Khuzestan
- County: Ahvaz
- Bakhsh: Central
- Rural District: Elhayi

Population (2006)
  - Total: 157
- Time zone: UTC+3:30 (IRST)
  - Summer (DST): UTC+4:30 (IRDT)

Jaaveleh (Persian: جعاوله, also Romanized as Ja‘āveleh; also known as Bāmdezh Ja‘āvoleh, Chaqāvoleh, and Jali‘eh) is a village in Elhayi Rural District, in the Central District of Ahvaz County, Khuzestan Province, Iran. At the 2006 census, its population was 157, in 25 families.
