= Rowghani, South Khorasan =

Rowghani روغني
- Village
- Location within Iran
- Coordinates: 32°06′22″N 60°13′19″E
- Country: Iran
- Province: South Khorasan
- County: Nehbandan
- Bakhsh: Shusef
- Rural District: Shusef

Population (2006)
  - Total: 56
- Time zone: UTC+3:30 (IRST)
  - Summer (DST): UTC+4:30 (IRDT)

Rowghani (Persian: روغني, also Romanized as Rowghanī; also known as Gīsvān) is a village in Shusef Rural District, Shusef District, Nehbandan County, South Khorasan Province, Iran. At the 2006 census, its population was 56, in 9 families.
