= Bagh-e Malek =

Town in Khuzestan province, Iran

Bagh-e Malek Persian: باغ ‌ملک
- Town
- Location within Iran
- Coordinates: 31°31′29″N 49°53′13″E
- Country: Iran
- Province: Khuzestan
- County: Bagh-e Malek
- District: Central

Population (2016)
  - Total: 26,343
- Time zone: UTC+3:30 (IRST)

Bagh-e Malek (Persian: باغ‌ ملک) (Note: Also romanized as Bagh Malek, Bāgh-e Malek, and Bagh-i-Malik) is a town in the Central District of Bagh-e Malek County, Khuzestan province, Iran, serving as capital of both the county and the district.

== Demographics ==
=== Population ===
At the time of the 2006 National Census, the town's population was 20,844 in 4,025 households. The following census in 2011 counted 23,352 people in 5,237 households. The 2016 census measured the population of the town as 26,343 people in 6,463 households.
