= Mollasani =

City in Khuzestan province, Iran

Mollasani Persian: ملاثاني
- City
- Location within Iran
- Coordinates: 31°35′03″N 48°53′11″E
- Country: Iran
- Province: Khuzestan
- County: Bavi
- District: Central

Population (2016)
  - Total: 17,337
- Time zone: UTC+3:30 (IRST)

Mollasani (Persian: ملاثاني) (Note: Also romanized as Mollā S̄ānī, Mollā Sāny, Mollāsānī, and Mulla Sāni; also known as Rāmīn) is a city in the Central District of Bavi County, Khuzestan province, Iran, serving as capital of both the county and the district. It is also the administrative center for Mollasani Rural District.

== Demographics ==
=== Population ===
At the time of the 2006 National Census, the city's population was 13,979 in 2,563 households, when it was capital of the former Bavi District of Ahvaz County. The following census in 2011 counted 14,813 people in 3,478 households, by which time the district had been separated from the county in the establishment of Bavi County. Mollasani was transferred to the new Central District as the county's capital. The 2016 census measured the population of the city as 17,337 people in 4,695 households.
