= Bavi District =

Former district in Khuzestan province, Iran

Bavi District Persian: بخش باوی
- Former District
- Location within Iran
- Coordinates: 31°32′N 48°57′E
- Country: Iran
- Province: Khuzestan
- County: Ahvaz
- Capital: Mollasani

Population (2006)
  - Total: 81,665
- Time zone: UTC+3:30 (IRST)

Bavi District (Persian: بخش مرکزی شهرستان اهواز) is a former administrative division of Ahvaz County, Khuzestan province, Iran. Its capital was the city of Mollasani.

== History ==
After the 2006 National Census, the district was separated from the county in the establishment of Bavi County.

== Demographics ==
=== Population ===
At the time of the 2006 census, the district's population was 81,665 in 14,423 households.

=== Administrative divisions ===
Bavi District Population
Administrative Divisions	2006
Mollasani RD	7,129
Veys RD	23,322
Mollasani (city)	13,979
Sheyban (city)	23,211
Veys (city)	14,024
Total	81,665
RD = Rural District
