= Susangerd =

City in Khuzestan province, Iran

Susangerd Persian: سوسنگرد
- City
- Location within Iran
- Coordinates: 31°33′25″N 48°11′22″E
- Country: Iran
- Province: Khuzestan
- County: Dasht-e Azadegan
- District: Central

Population (2016)
  - Total: 51,431
- Time zone: UTC+3:30 (IRST)

Susangerd (Persian: سوسنگرد) (Note: Also known as Dasht-e Āzādegān (دشت آزادگان), Dasht-i-Mishān (دشت میشان), al-Khafājiyah (Arabic: الخفاجية), Sūsangird, and Sūsangurd) is a city in the Central District of Dasht-e Azadegan County, Khuzestan province, Iran, serving as the capital of both the county and the district. The vast majority of its inhabitants are Khuzestani Arabs. Susangerd is considered among the famous cities of Iran due to the Iran–Iraq War and the city's liberation from the siege of Iraqi forces.

== History ==
In the past, the city of Susangerd was a village called Khafajieh and the area around it was called Dasht-e-Mishan. Later, during the reign of Reza Shah, this village was renamed to the city of Susangerd, which means the place of worship of Nahid in ancient Iran. Dasht-e-Mishan, the ancient name of the region, was changed to Dasht-e-Azadegan after the Islamic Revolution, meaning "Plain of the Free."

During the war, the Iraqi army tried three times to capture Susangerd, but the siege was met with resistance from the Iranian army and popular forces. In the third attack, the city was surrounded by the Iraqi army, but soon after, the Iraqis were defeated and Susangerd was liberated. Among the people who remained in the city were Azerbaijani fighters, which is why the city of Tabriz has a park named after Susangerd.

== Demographics ==
=== Population ===
At the time of the 2006 National Census, the city's population was 43,591 in 7,636 households. The 2011 census counted 44,469 people in 9,900 households. The 2016 census measured the city's population as 51,431 in 12,664 households.

== See also ==
- Hoveyzeh
- Shadegan
- Bostan
- Liberation of Susangerd

Media related to Susangerd at Wikimedia Commons
