= Ramhormoz =

City in Khuzestan province, Iran

Ramhormoz Persian: رامهرمز
- City
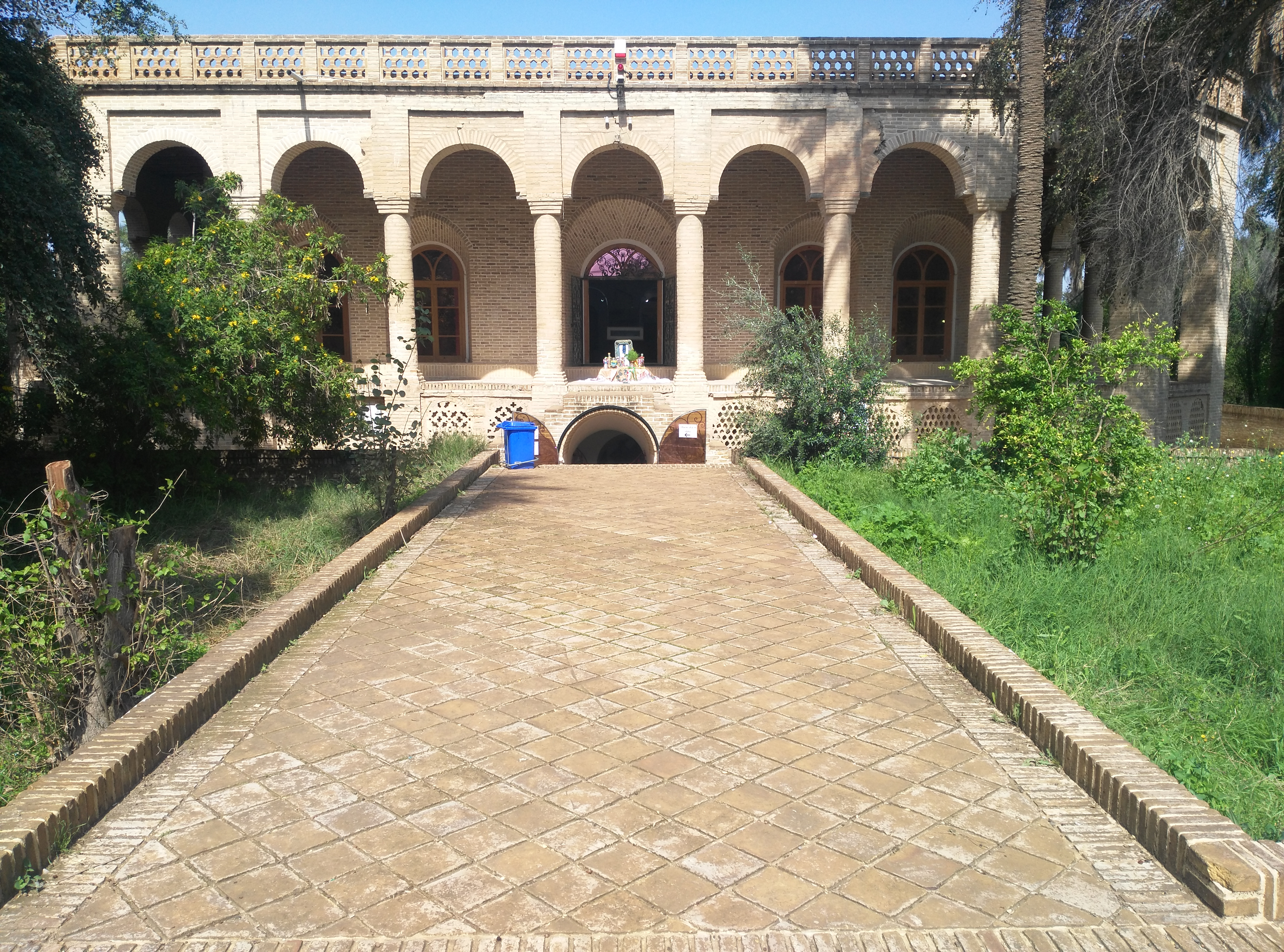
- Main building of Samimi Mansion

- Location within Iran Location within Near East
- Coordinates: 31°16′31″N 49°36′16″E
- Country: Iran
- Province: Khuzestan
- County: Ramhormoz
- District: Central

Area
  - Total: 49.49 km^{2} (19.11 sq mi)

Population (2016)
  - Total: 74,285
  - Density: 1,501/km^{2} (3,888/sq mi)
- Time zone: UTC+3:30 (IRST)

Ramhormoz (Persian: رامهرمز) (Note: Also romanized as Rām Hormuz and Rāmhormoz; Luri: رومز, romanized as Rümez; also known as Rāmuz) is a city in the Central District of Ramhormoz County, Khuzestan province, Iran, serving as capital of both the county and the district. In ancient times it had been known as Samangan, having been established by the Sasanian emperor Hormizd I, although an Elamite tomb has been found as well. The historical territory of Ramshir is in this area, only 3 kilometres (1.9 mi) away from the city.

== History ==
According to a hadith in Sahih al-Bukhari, Ramhormoz is the ancestral home of Salman the Persian, a companion of the Prophet.

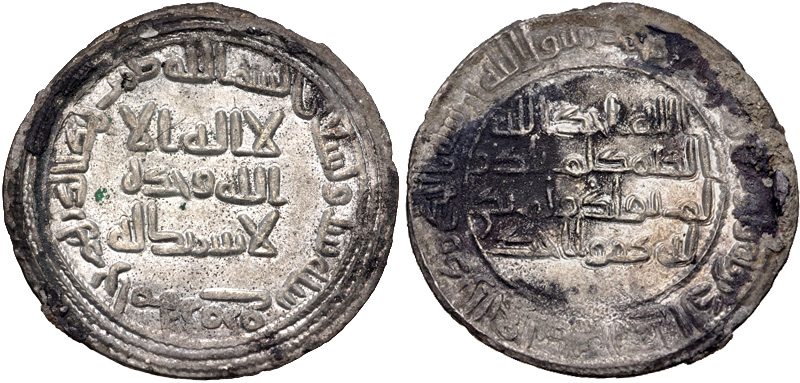
Silver coin of the Caliphate, mint at Ramhurmuz minted Dated AH 96 (AD 714/5) during Al-Walid I's reign

The proper history of the city begins in the Sasanian era, although there have been Elamite remains found in and around the city as well. The tomb of the Sasanian founder of the city, Hormizd I, is commonly thought to be situated within the city. "With the gradual Muslim conquest of Khuzestan in the 7th century, Rāmhormoz was the scene of a peace agreement between the local Sasanian satrap, Hormozān, and the commander of the Muslim army.".

During the Islamic times, it was remarked by Muslim geographers that the city contained a library comparable only to the one in Basra in the wealth of its collection, and that silk was produced in the city and distributed to distant lands. The city enjoyed incredible opulence before entering a state of decline.

Ramhormoz was the location in which Elamite was last reported to be spoken. This report was written circa 988 AD by Al-Muqaddasi, characterizing the local Khuzi people as bilingual in Arabic and Persian but also speaking an "incomprehensible" language. The town had recently become prosperous again after the foundation of a market. As it received an influx of foreigners and being a "Khuzi" was stigmatized at the time, the language probably died out in the 11th century.

The 14th-century Muslim Amazigh traveler and explorer ibn Battuta visited the city during his travels and described the city as "a fine city with fruit-trees and rivers."

From late Safavid until Qajar Iran, the allegiance of the city frequently shifted between Khuzestan and Fars province. In the 18th and 19th centuries, Lurs and Arabs started to settle within and around the city from nearby lands.

== Demographics ==
=== Language ===
Ramhormoz people speak Bakhtiari dialect like Masjid Suleiman and Aghajari.Iranica has clearly considered the language of the communities living in Ramhormoz to be Southern Luri.Ramhormzi dialect is a pseudo Bakhtiari dialect.The language of the people of Ramhormoz (also called Romsi) is Bakhtiari dialect.Ramhormzi's accent is the same as Lori Bakhtiari's, which is slightly different.

=== People ===
The population of the town included the Luri-speaking Bakhtiari, Bahma'i, and Boyerahmadi, as well as Arabic-speaking Bani Lam, and Turkic-speaking Qashqai. The people of Ramhormoz are from the Bakhtiari tribe and from the Chaharlang tribes, and there are tribes from other tribes such as Khodri of Dashtestan, Zarezadeh, Bigdali, and Talavari.

=== Population ===
At the time of the 2006 National Census, the city's population was 49,822 in 10,966 households. The following census in 2011 counted 69,869 people in 17,046 households. The 2016 census measured the population of the city as 74,285 people in 20,127 households.

== Climate ==
Ramhormoz has a hot semi-arid climate (Köppen climate classification: BSh).

Climate data for Ramhormoz (1987–2010)
Month	Jan	Feb	Mar	Apr	May	Jun	Jul	Aug	Sep	Oct	Nov	Dec	Year
Record high °C (°F)	27.2 (81.0)	31.0 (87.8)	37.4 (99.3)	43.2 (109.8)	47.8 (118.0)	50.6 (123.1)	51.6 (124.9)	51.4 (124.5)	48.6 (119.5)	43.0 (109.4)	35.8 (96.4)	31.0 (87.8)	51.6 (124.9)
Mean daily maximum °C (°F)	17.1 (62.8)	20.2 (68.4)	25.2 (77.4)	32.1 (89.8)	39.7 (103.5)	44.5 (112.1)	46.0 (114.8)	45.8 (114.4)	42.0 (107.6)	35.9 (96.6)	26.7 (80.1)	19.8 (67.6)	32.9 (91.2)
Daily mean °C (°F)	12.7 (54.9)	15.0 (59.0)	19.2 (66.6)	25.4 (77.7)	32.2 (90.0)	36.3 (97.3)	38.2 (100.8)	38.0 (100.4)	34.2 (93.6)	28.9 (84.0)	20.7 (69.3)	15.0 (59.0)	26.3 (79.3)
Mean daily minimum °C (°F)	9.3 (48.7)	9.8 (49.6)	13.3 (55.9)	18.7 (65.7)	24.7 (76.5)	28.2 (82.8)	30.5 (86.9)	30.1 (86.2)	26.3 (79.3)	21.8 (71.2)	14.7 (58.5)	10.2 (50.4)	19.7 (67.5)
Record low °C (°F)	−0.8 (30.6)	−0.8 (30.6)	2.8 (37.0)	7.6 (45.7)	15.6 (60.1)	21.6 (70.9)	23.4 (74.1)	22.6 (72.7)	18.4 (65.1)	12.4 (54.3)	2.2 (36.0)	0.6 (33.1)	−0.8 (30.6)
Average precipitation mm (inches)	77.1 (3.04)	42.5 (1.67)	43.2 (1.70)	19.7 (0.78)	1.9 (0.07)	0.1 (0.00)	0.1 (0.00)	0.2 (0.01)	0.9 (0.04)	8.0 (0.31)	29.0 (1.14)	87.5 (3.44)	310.2 (12.21)
Average precipitation days (≥ 1.0 mm)	7.0	4.4	4.3	3.2	0.5	0.0	0.0	0.1	0.1	0.8	3.4	5.7	29.5
Average relative humidity (%)	69	58	48	37	21	17	19	21	21	28	45	65	37
Mean monthly sunshine hours	175.5	195.1	229.8	233.4	290.6	339.6	336.1	339.8	309.8	272.3	214.7	178.3	3,115
Source: Iran Meteorological Organization (records), (temperatures), (precipitation), (humidity), (days with precipitation), (sunshine)

== See also ==
- Tashkooh mountain
- Abū Muḥammad al-Ḥasan ibn ʻAbd al-Raḥmān ibn Khallād al-Rāmahurmuzī—an early Islamic scholar and hadith specialist

Media related to Ramhormoz at Wikimedia Commons
