= Veys =

City in Khuzestan province, Iran

Weys Persian: Weys
- City
- Location within Iran
- Coordinates: 31°29′10″N 48°52′29″E
- Country: Iran
- Province: Khuzestan
- County: Bavi
- District: Veys

Population (2016)
  - Total: 15,312
- Time zone: UTC+3:30 (IRST)

Veys or Weys (Persian: Weys) (Note: Also romanized as Vais and Wais) is a city in, and the capital of, Weys District of Bavi County, Khuzestan province, Iran. It also serves as the administrative center for Veys Rural District.

== Demographics ==
=== Population ===
At the time of the 2006 National Census, the city's population was 14,024 in 2,478 households, when it was in the former Bavi District of Ahvaz County). The following census in 2011 counted 15,105 people in 3,919 households, by which time the district had been separated from the county in the establishment of Bavi County. The 2016 census measured the population of the city as 15,312 people in 4,064 households. Veys was transferred to the new Veys District.
