= Central District (Bavi County) =

District in Khuzestan province, Iran

Central District (Bavi County) Persian: بخش مرکزی شهرستان باوی
- District
- Location within Iran
- Coordinates: 31°35′13″N 48°56′41″E
- Country: Iran
- Province: Khuzestan
- County: Bavi
- Capital: Mollasani

Population (2016)
  - Total: 33,802
- Time zone: UTC+3:30 (IRST)

The Central District of Bavi County (Persian: بخش مرکزی شهرستان باوی) is in Khuzestan province, Iran. Its capital is the city of Mollasani.

== History ==
After the 2006 National Census, Bavi District was separated from Ahvaz County in the establishment of Bavi County, which was divided into two districts of two rural districts each, with Mollasani as its capital.

== Demographics ==
=== Population ===
At the time of the 2011 census, the district's population was 32,468 people in 7,452 households. The 2016 census measured the population of the district as 33,802 inhabitants in 9,048 households.

=== Administrative divisions ===
Central District (Bavi County) Population
Administrative Divisions	2011	2016
Anaqcheh RD	9,005	10,321
Mollasani RD	8,650	6,144
Mollasani (city)	14,813	17,337
Total	32,468	33,802
RD = Rural District
