= Mollasani Rural District =

Rural district in Khuzestan province, Iran

Mollasani Rural District Persian: دهستان ملاثانی
- Rural District
- Location within Iran
- Coordinates: 31°35′52″N 49°02′07″E
- Country: Iran
- Province: Khuzestan
- County: Bavi
- District: Central
- Capital: Mollasani

Population (2016)
  - Total: 6,144
- Time zone: UTC+3:30 (IRST)

Mollasani Rural District (Persian: دهستان ملاثانی) is in the Central District of Bavi County, Khuzestan province, Iran. It is administered from the city of Mollasani.

== Demographics ==
=== Population ===
At the time of the 2006 National Census, the rural district's population (as a part of the former Bavi District of Ahvaz County) was 7,129 in 1,403 households. There were 8,650 inhabitants in 1,862 households at the following census of 2011, by which time the district had been separated from the county in the establishment of Bavi County. The rural district was transferred to the new Central District. The 2016 census measured the population of the rural district as 6,144 in 1,616 households. The most populous of its 47 villages was Tall Bumeh, with 1,206 people.
