= Veys District =

District in Khuzestan province, Iran

Veys District Persian: بخش ویس
- District
- Location within Iran
- Coordinates: 31°26′42″N 48°59′01″E
- Country: Iran
- Province: Khuzestan
- County: Bavi
- Capital: Veys

Population (2016)
  - Total: 62,681
- Time zone: UTC+3:30 (IRST)

Veys District (Persian: بخش ویس) is in Bavi County, Khuzestan province, Iran. Its capital is the city of Veys.

== History ==
After the 2006 National Census, Bavi District was separated from Ahvaz County in the establishment of Bavi County, which was divided into two districts of two rural districts each, with the city of Mollasani as its capital.

== Demographics ==
=== Population ===
At the time of the 2011 census, the district's population was 56,692 people in 13,862 households. The 2016 census measured the population of the district as 62,681 inhabitants in 16,548 households.

=== Administrative divisions ===
Veys District Population
Administrative Divisions	2011	2016
Veys RD	2,478	2,318
Zargan RD	14,141	8,677
Sheyban (city)	24,968	36,374
Veys (city)	15,105	15,312
Total	56,692	62,681
RD = Rural District
