= Veys Rural District =

Rural district in Khuzestan province, Iran

Veys Rural District Persian: دهستان ويس
- Rural District
- Location within Iran
- Coordinates: 31°26′42″N 48°59′54″E
- Country: Iran
- Province: Khuzestan
- County: Bavi
- District: Veys
- Capital: Veys

Population (2016)
  - Total: 2,318
- Time zone: UTC+3:30 (IRST)

Veys Rural District (Persian: دهستان ويس) is in Veys District of Bavi County, Khuzestan province, Iran. It is administered from the city of Veys.

== Demographics ==
=== Population ===
At the time of the 2006 National Census, the rural district's population (as a part of the former Bavi District of Ahvaz County) was 23,322 in 3,916 households. There were 2,478 inhabitants in 586 households at the following census of 2011, by which time the district had been separated from the county in the establishment of Bavi County. The rural district was transferred to the new Veys District. The 2016 census measured the population of the rural district as 2,318 in 565 households. The most populous of its 22 villages was Robeykheh, with 613 people.
