= Bavi County =

County in Khuzestan province, Iran

Bavi County Persian: شهرستان باوی
- County
- Location of Bavi County in Khuzestan province (center, pink)

- Location of Khuzestan province in Iran
- Coordinates: 31°32′N 48°57′E
- Country: Iran
- Province: Khuzestan
- Capital: Mollasani
- Districts: Central, Veys

Population (2016)
  - Total: 96,484
- Time zone: UTC+3:30 (IRST)

Bavi County (Persian: شهرستان باوی) is in Khuzestan province, Iran. Its capital is the city of Mollasani.

== History ==
After the National Census of 2006, Bavi District was separated from Ahvaz County in the establishment of Bavi County, which was divided into two districts of two rural districts each, with Mollasani as its capital.

== Demographics ==
=== Population ===
The census in 2011 counted 89,160 people in 21,308 households. The 2016 census measured the population of the county as 96,484 in 25,597 households.

=== Administrative divisions ===
Bavi County's population history and administrative structure over two consecutive censuses are shown in the following table.

Bavi County Population
| Administrative Divisions | 2011 | 2016 |
|---|---|---|
| Central District | 32,468 | 33,802 |
| Anaqcheh RD | 9,005 | 10,321 |
| Mollasani RD | 8,650 | 6,144 |
| Mollasani (city) | 14,813 | 17,337 |
| Veys District | 56,692 | 62,681 |
| Veys RD | 2,478 | 2,318 |
| Zargan RD | 14,141 | 8,677 |
| Sheyban (city) | 24,968 | 36,374 |
| Veys (city) | 15,105 | 15,312 |
| Total | 89,160 | 96,484 |
RD = Rural District

== See also ==
Media related to Bavi County at Wikimedia Commons
