= Safheh-ye Yek =

Village in Khuzestan province, Iran

Safheh-ye Yek Persian: صفحه يک
- Village
- Location within Iran
- Coordinates: 31°07′33″N 48°23′54″E
- Country: Iran
- Province: Khuzestan
- County: Ahvaz
- District: Esmailiyeh
- Rural District: Esmailiyeh-ye Jonubi

Population (2016)
  - Total: 108
- Time zone: UTC+3:30 (IRST)

Safheh-ye Yek (Persian: صفحه يک) is a village in Esmailiyeh-ye Jonubi Rural District of Esmailiyeh District, Ahvaz County, Khuzestan province, Iran. It was the capital of Esmailiyeh Rural District (Note: Renamed Esmailiyeh-ye Shomali Rural District) until its capital was transferred to the village of Khobeyneh-ye Sofla.

== Demographics ==
=== Population ===
At the time of the 2006 National Census, the village's population was below the reporting threshold, when it was in Esmailiyeh Rural District of the Central District. The following census in 2011 counted 102 people in 24 households. The 2016 census measured the population of the village as 108 people in 28 households, by which time the rural district had been separated from the district in the formation of Esmailiyeh District and renamed Esmailiyeh-ye Shomali Rural District. Safheh-ye Yek was transferred to Esmailiyeh-ye Jonubi Rural District created in the new district.
