= Gobeyr (disambiguation) =

Gobeyr is a village in Khuzestan Province, Iran.

Gobeyr (Persian: گبير) may also refer to:

- Gobeyr 1
- Gobeyr 2
- Gobeyr 3
- Gobeyr-e Zahir
