= Shoaymit =

Shoaymit or Shoeymet or Shoaymat or Shoameyt (Persian: شعيمط) may refer to:

- Shoaymat 1
- Shoaymat 2
- Shoaymat 3
- Shoaymit-e Jaber
- Shoaymit-e Mandil
