= Hofireh (disambiguation) =

Hofireh is a village in Ahvaz County, Khuzestan Province, Iran.

Hofireh or Hofeyreh (Persian: حفيره) may also refer to:

- Hofireh-ye Hajji Barbeyn, Ahvaz County, Khuzestan Province, Iran
- Hofireh-ye Olya, Ramshir County, Khuzestan Province, Iran
- Hofeyreh, alternate name of Khoveyseh, Ahvaz
