= Beyt-e Vavi =

Village in Khuzestan province, Iran

Beyt-e Vavi Persian: بيت واوي
- Village
- Location within Iran
- Coordinates: 31°01′06″N 48°21′32″E
- Country: Iran
- Province: Khuzestan
- County: Ahvaz
- District: Esmailiyeh
- Rural District: Esmailiyeh-ye Jonubi

Population (2016)
  - Total: 1,548
- Time zone: UTC+3:30 (IRST)

Beyt-e Vavi (Persian: بيت واوي) (Note: Also romanized as Beyt-e Vāvī) is a village in, and the capital of, Esmailiyeh-ye Jonubi Rural District of Esmailiyeh District, Ahvaz County, Khuzestan province, Iran.

== Demographics ==
=== Population ===
At the time of the 2006 National Census, the village's population was 728 in 145 households, when it was in Esmailiyeh Rural District (Note: Renamed Esmailiyeh-ye Shomali Rural District) of the Central District. The following census in 2011 counted 1,217 people in 251 households. The 2016 census measured the population of the village as 1,548 people in 361 households, by which time the rural district had been separated from the district in the formation of Esmailiyeh District and renamed Esmailiyeh-ye Shomali Rural District. Beyt-e Vavi was transferred to Esmailiyeh-ye Jonubi Rural District created in the new district. It was the most populous village in its rural district.
