= Safheh-ye Do =

Village in Khuzestan province, Iran

Safheh-ye Do Persian: صفحه دو
- Village
- Location within Iran
- Coordinates: 31°07′06″N 48°22′57″E
- Country: Iran
- Province: Khuzestan
- County: Ahvaz
- District: Esmailiyeh
- Rural District: Esmailiyeh-ye Jonubi

Population (2016)
  - Total: 761
- Time zone: UTC+3:30 (IRST)

Safheh-ye Do (Persian: صفحه دو) (Note: Also romanized as Şafḩeh-ye Do; also known as Şafḩeh) is a village in Esmailiyeh-ye Jonubi Rural District of Esmailiyeh District, Ahvaz County, Khuzestan province, Iran, serving as capital of the district.

== Demographics ==
=== Population ===
At the time of the 2006 National Census, the village's population was 555 in 89 households, when it was in Esmailiyeh Rural District (Note: Renamed Esmailiyeh-ye Shomali Rural District) of the Central District. The following census in 2011 counted 727 people in 159 households. The 2016 census measured the population of the village as 761 people in 175 households, by which time the rural district had been separated from the district in the establishment of Esmailiyeh District and renamed Esmailiyeh-ye Shomali Rural District. Safheh-ye Do was transferred to Esmailiyeh-e Jonubi Rural District created in the new district.
