= Mazban =

Mazban مزبان
- Village
- Location within Iran
- Coordinates: 31°04′28″N 48°22′02″E
- Country: Iran
- Province: Khuzestan
- County: Ahvaz
- Bakhsh: Central
- Rural District: Esmailiyeh

Population (2006)
  - Total: 228
- Time zone: UTC+3:30 (IRST)
  - Summer (DST): UTC+4:30 (IRDT)

Mazban (Persian: مزبان, also Romanized as Mazbān) is a village in Esmailiyeh Rural District, in the Central District of Ahvaz County, Khuzestan Province, Iran. At the 2006 census, its population was 228, in 40 families.
