= Eyn ol Mejibel =

Eyn ol Mejibel عين الموجيبل
- Village
- Location within Iran
- Coordinates: 31°22′26″N 49°13′11″E
- Country: Iran
- Province: Khuzestan
- County: Ahvaz
- Bakhsh: Central
- Rural District: Gheyzaniyeh

Population (2006)
  - Total: 27
- Time zone: UTC+3:30 (IRST)
  - Summer (DST): UTC+4:30 (IRDT)

Eyn ol Mejibel (Persian: عين الموجيبل, also Romanized as ‘Eyn ol Mejībel; also known as ‘Eyn ol Mejbel, ‘Eyn ol Mejbel, ‘Eyn ol Mejīl, Mojeybel, and Mojeyyel) is a village in Gheyzaniyeh Rural District, in the Central District of Ahvaz County, Khuzestan Province, Iran. At the 2006 census, its population was 27, in 4 families.
