= Tampureh-ye Ruisheyd =

Tampureh-ye Ruisheyd تمپوره رويشيد
- Village
- Location within Iran
- Coordinates: 31°08′23″N 48°50′20″E
- Country: Iran
- Province: Khuzestan
- County: Ahvaz
- Bakhsh: Central
- Rural District: Mosharrahat

Population (2006)
  - Total: 21
- Time zone: UTC+3:30 (IRST)
  - Summer (DST): UTC+4:30 (IRDT)

Tampureh-ye Ruisheyd (Persian: تمپوره رويشيد, also Romanized as Tampūreh-ye Rūīsheyd; also known as Dambar Rū’shīd and Tambūdorūsheyd) is a village in Mosharrahat Rural District, in the Central District of Ahvaz County, Khuzestan Province, Iran. At the 2006 census, its population was 21, in 4 families.
