= Am Altamir =

Village in Khuzestan province, Iran

Am Altamir Persian: ام الطمير
- Village
- Location within Iran
- Coordinates: 31°15′04″N 48°33′23″E
- Country: Iran
- Province: Khuzestan
- County: Ahvaz
- District: Esmailiyeh
- Rural District: Esmailiyeh-ye Shomali

Population (2016)
  - Total: 5,004
- Time zone: UTC+3:30 (IRST)

Am Altamir (Persian: ام الطمير) (Note: Also romanized as Ām Ālṭamīr) is a village in Esmailiyeh-ye Shomali Rural District (Note: Formerly Esmailiyeh Rural District) of Esmailiyeh District, Ahvaz County, Khuzestan province, Iran.

== Demographics ==
=== Population ===
At the time of the 2006 National Census, the village's population was 2,616 in 509 households, when it was in Esmailiyeh Rural District (Note: Renamed Esmailiyeh-ye Shomali Rural District) of the Central District. The following census in 2011 counted 3,559 people in 805 households. The 2016 census measured the population of the village as 5,004 people in 1,263 households, by which time the rural district had been separated from the district in the formation of Esmailiyeh District and renamed Esmailiyeh-ye Shomali Rural District. It was the most populous village in its rural district.
