= Ramziyeh-ye Do =

Ramziyeh-ye Do رمزيه دو
- Village
- Location within Iran
- Coordinates: 31°12′26″N 48°22′33″E
- Country: Iran
- Province: Khuzestan
- County: Ahvaz
- Bakhsh: Central
- Rural District: Esmailiyeh

Population (2006)
  - Total: 84
- Time zone: UTC+3:30 (IRST)
  - Summer (DST): UTC+4:30 (IRDT)

Ramziyeh-ye Do (Persian: رمزيه دو, also Romanized as Ramzīyeh-ye Do; also known as Ramzeyeh-ye Do and Ramzīyeh) is a village in Esmailiyeh Rural District, in the Central District of Ahvaz County, Khuzestan Province, Iran. At the 2006 census, its population was 84, in 13 families.
