= Malihan =

Malihan مليحان
- Village
- Location within Iran
- Coordinates: 31°11′18″N 48°28′51″E
- Country: Iran
- Province: Khuzestan
- County: Ahvaz
- Bakhsh: Central
- Rural District: Esmailiyeh

Population (2006)
  - Total: 346
- Time zone: UTC+3:30 (IRST)
  - Summer (DST): UTC+4:30 (IRDT)

Malihan (Persian: مليحان, also Romanized as Malīḩān and Maleyḩān) is a village in Esmailiyeh Rural District, in the Central District of Ahvaz County, Khuzestan Province, Iran. At the 2006 census, its population was 346, in 62 families.
