= Abu Kabireh =

Village in Khuzestan province, Iran

Abu Kabireh Persian: ابوكبريه
- Village
- Location within Iran
- Coordinates: 31°07′13″N 48°55′25″E
- Country: Iran
- Province: Khuzestan
- County: Ahvaz
- District: Gheyzaniyeh
- Rural District: Mosharrahat

Population (2016)
  - Total: 167
- Time zone: UTC+3:30 (IRST)

Abu Kabireh (Persian: ابوكبريه) (Note: Also romanized as Abū Kabīreh; also known as Abū Kabīrī and Abū Kabīrīyeh) is a village in Mosharrahat Rural District of Gheyzaniyeh District, Ahvaz County, Khuzestan province, Iran.

== Demographics ==
=== Population ===
At the time of the 2006 National Census, the village's population was 167 in 37 households, when it was in the Central District. The following census in 2011 counted 166 people in 31 households. The 2016 census measured the population of the village as 167 in 37 households, by which time the rural district had been separated from the district in the formation of Gheyzaniyeh District.
