= Albu Sanvan =

Albu Sanvan البوثنوان
- Village
- Location within Iran
- Coordinates: 31°35′57″N 48°34′34″E
- Country: Iran
- Province: Khuzestan
- County: Ahvaz
- Bakhsh: Central
- Rural District: Elhayi

Population (2006)
  - Total: 894
- Time zone: UTC+3:30 (IRST)
  - Summer (DST): UTC+4:30 (IRDT)

Albu Sanvan (Persian: البوثنوان, also Romanized as Ālbū Sanvān) is a village in Elhayi Rural District, in the Central District of Ahvaz County, Khuzestan Province, Iran. At the 2006 census, its population was 894, in 164 families.
