= Mosharrahat =

Village in Khuzestan province, Iran

Mosharrahat Persian: مشرحات
- Village
- Location within Iran
- Coordinates: 31°12′35″N 48°56′03″E
- Country: Iran
- Province: Khuzestan
- County: Ahvaz
- District: Gheyzaniyeh
- Rural District: Mosharrahat

Population (2016)
  - Total: 338
- Time zone: UTC+3:30 (IRST)

Mosharrahat (Persian: مشرحات) (Note: Also romanized as Mashraḩāt and Mosharraḩāt; also known as Mosharrebeh and Musharhar) is a village in, and the capital of, Mosharrahat Rural District of Gheyzaniyeh District, Ahvaz County, Khuzestan province, Iran.

== Demographics ==
=== Population ===
At the time of the 2006 National Census, the village's population was 302 in 64 households, when it was in the Central District. The following census in 2011 counted 287 people in 77 households. The 2016 census measured the population of the village as 338 people in 95 households, by which time the rural district had been separated from the district in the formation of Gheyzaniyeh District.
