= Saleh Zobeyri =

Saleh Zobeyri صالح زباري
- Village
- Location within Iran
- Coordinates: 31°43′44″N 48°31′16″E
- Country: Iran
- Province: Khuzestan
- County: Ahvaz
- Bakhsh: Central
- Rural District: Elhayi

Population (2006)
  - Total: 98
- Time zone: UTC+3:30 (IRST)
  - Summer (DST): UTC+4:30 (IRDT)

Saleh Zobeyri (Persian: صالح زباري, also Romanized as Şāleḩ Zobeyrī) is a village in Elhayi Rural District, in the Central District of Ahvaz County, Khuzestan Province, Iran. At the 2006 census, its population was 98, in 18 families.
