= Arab Rashed =

Arab Rashed عرب راشد
- Village
- Location within Iran
- Coordinates: 31°17′56″N 49°13′42″E
- Country: Iran
- Province: Khuzestan
- County: Ahvaz
- Bakhsh: Central
- Rural District: Gheyzaniyeh

Population (2006)
  - Total: 167
- Time zone: UTC+3:30 (IRST)
  - Summer (DST): UTC+4:30 (IRDT)

Arab Rashed (Persian: عرب راشد, also Romanized as ‘Arab Rāshed and ‘Arbrāshed) is a village in Gheyzaniyeh Rural District, in the Central District of Ahvaz County, Khuzestan Province, Iran. At the 2006 census, its population was 167, in 31 families.
