= Seyyed Nabi =

Seyyed Nabi سيدنبي
- Village
- Location within Iran
- Coordinates: 31°44′20″N 48°40′27″E
- Country: Iran
- Province: Khuzestan
- County: Ahvaz
- Bakhsh: Central
- Rural District: Elhayi

Population (2006)
  - Total: 298
- Time zone: UTC+3:30 (IRST)
  - Summer (DST): UTC+4:30 (IRDT)

Seyyed Nabi (Persian: سيدنبي, also Romanized as Seyyed Nabī) is a village in Elhayi Rural District, in the Central District of Ahvaz County, Khuzestan Province, Iran. At the 2006 census, its population was 298, in 45 families.
