= Sahinat =

Sahinat صحينات
- Village
- Location within Iran
- Coordinates: 31°20′09″N 49°09′07″E
- Country: Iran
- Province: Khuzestan
- County: Ahvaz
- Bakhsh: Central
- Rural District: Gheyzaniyeh

Population (2006)
  - Total: 156
- Time zone: UTC+3:30 (IRST)
  - Summer (DST): UTC+4:30 (IRDT)

Sahinat (Persian: صحينات, also Romanized as Şaḩīnat, Saheynat, and Şoḩaynāt) is a village in Gheyzaniyeh Rural District, in the Central District of Ahvaz County, Khuzestan Province, Iran. At the 2006 census, its population was 156, in 28 families.
