= Seyyed Hamid =

Seyyed Hamid سيدحميد
- Village
- Location within Iran
- Coordinates: 31°15′19″N 48°20′59″E
- Country: Iran
- Province: Khuzestan
- County: Ahvaz
- Bakhsh: Central
- Rural District: Esmailiyeh

Population (2006)
  - Total: 38
- Time zone: UTC+3:30 (IRST)
  - Summer (DST): UTC+4:30 (IRDT)

Seyyed Hamid (Persian: سيدحميد, also Romanized as Seyyed Ḩamīd; also known as Maḩall-e Eḩdās̄-e Rūstāy-e Seyyed Ḩamīd) is a village in Esmailiyeh Rural District, in the Central District of Ahvaz County, Khuzestan Province, Iran. At the 2006 census, its population was 38, in 8 families.
