= Ruzaneh =

Ruzaneh روزنه
- Village
- Location within Iran
- Coordinates: 31°06′10″N 48°57′52″E
- Country: Iran
- Province: Khuzestan
- County: Ahvaz
- Bakhsh: Central
- Rural District: Mosharrahat

Population (2006)
  - Total: 104
- Time zone: UTC+3:30 (IRST)
  - Summer (DST): UTC+4:30 (IRDT)

Ruzaneh (Persian: روزنه, also Romanized as Rūzaneh and Rowzaneh; also known as Ruzīneh) is a village in Mosharrahat Rural District, in the Central District of Ahvaz County, Khuzestan Province, Iran. At the 2006 census, its population was 104, in 22 families.
