= Sofeyreh =

Sofeyreh صفيره
- Village
- Location within Iran
- Coordinates: 31°16′18″N 48°51′58″E
- Country: Iran
- Province: Khuzestan
- County: Ahvaz
- Bakhsh: Central
- Rural District: Mosharrahat

Population (2006)
  - Total: 311
- Time zone: UTC+3:30 (IRST)
  - Summer (DST): UTC+4:30 (IRDT)

Sofeyreh (Persian: صفيره, also Romanized as Şofeyreh; also known as Safareh and Safera) is a village in Mosharrahat Rural District, in the Central District of Ahvaz County, Khuzestan Province, Iran. At the 2006 census, its population was 311, in 59 families.
