= Seyyed Yusef =

Village in Khuzestan, Iran

Seyyed Yusef سيديوسف
- Village
- Location within Iran
- Coordinates: 31°07′23″N 49°00′06″E
- Country: Iran
- Province: Khuzestan
- County: Ahvaz
- Bakhsh: Central
- Rural District: Mosharrahat

Population (2006)
  - Total: 66
- Time zone: UTC+3:30 (IRST)
  - Summer (DST): UTC+4:30 (IRDT)

Seyyed Yusef (Persian: سيديوسف, also Romanized as Seyyed Yūsef and Seyyed Yūsof; also known as Seyyed Yūsol) is a village in Mosharrahat Rural District, in the Central District of Ahvaz County, Khuzestan Province, Iran. At the 2006 census, its population was 66, in 15 families.
