= Lazeh =

Lazeh لذه
- Village
- Location within Iran
- Coordinates: 31°18′39″N 48°46′12″E
- Country: Iran
- Province: Khuzestan
- County: Ahvaz
- Bakhsh: Central
- Rural District: Mosharrahat

Population (2006)
  - Total: 186
- Time zone: UTC+3:30 (IRST)
  - Summer (DST): UTC+4:30 (IRDT)

Lazeh (Persian: لذه, also Romanized as Lazeh and Lez̧z̧eh) is a village in Mosharrahat Rural District, in the Central District of Ahvaz County, Khuzestan Province, Iran. At the 2006 census, its population was 186, in 33 families.
