= Moni Sar =

Moni Sar منيصر
- Village
- Location within Iran
- Coordinates: 31°06′41″N 49°05′52″E
- Country: Iran
- Province: Khuzestan
- County: Ahvaz
- Bakhsh: Central
- Rural District: Gheyzaniyeh

Population (2006)
  - Total: 140
- Time zone: UTC+3:30 (IRST)
  - Summer (DST): UTC+4:30 (IRDT)

Moni Sar (Persian: منيصر, also Romanized as Monī Sar; also known as Mane-Sīr, Manīser, Manīsur, and Monīşer) is a village in Gheyzaniyeh Rural District, in the Central District of Ahvaz County, Khuzestan Province, Iran. At the 2006 census, its population was 140, in 16 families.
