= Hamuleh =

Hamuleh حموله
- Village
- Location within Iran
- Coordinates: 31°44′51″N 48°39′43″E
- Country: Iran
- Province: Khuzestan
- County: Ahvaz
- Bakhsh: Central
- Rural District: Elhayi

Population (2006)
  - Total: 317
- Time zone: UTC+3:30 (IRST)
  - Summer (DST): UTC+4:30 (IRDT)

Hamuleh (Persian: حموله, also Romanized as Ḩamūleh and Ḩomūleh) is a village in Elhayi Rural District, in the Central District of Ahvaz County, Khuzestan Province, Iran. At the 2006 census, its population was 317, in 49 families.
