= Kazemi-ye Do =

Kazemi-ye Do كاظمي دو
- Village
- Location within Iran
- Coordinates: 30°58′07″N 48°21′27″E
- Country: Iran
- Province: Khuzestan
- County: Ahvaz
- Bakhsh: Central
- Rural District: Esmailiyeh

Population (2006)
  - Total: 307
- Time zone: UTC+3:30 (IRST)
  - Summer (DST): UTC+4:30 (IRDT)

Kazemi-ye Do (Persian: كاظمي دو, also Romanized as Kāz̧emī-ye Do) is a village in Esmailiyeh Rural District, in the Central District of Ahvaz County, Khuzestan Province, Iran. At the 2006 census, its population was 307, in 62 families.
