= Hamidan =

Hamidan حميدان
- Village
- Location within Iran
- Coordinates: 31°07′10″N 49°10′48″E
- Country: Iran
- Province: Khuzestan
- County: Ahvaz
- Bakhsh: Central
- Rural District: Gheyzaniyeh

Population (2006)
  - Total: 137
- Time zone: UTC+3:30 (IRST)
  - Summer (DST): UTC+4:30 (IRDT)

Hamidan (Persian: حميدان, also Romanized as Ḩamīdān; also known as Dehlā’īyeh and Deh Lāleh) is a village in Gheyzaniyeh Rural District, in the Central District of Ahvaz County, Khuzestan Province, Iran. At the 2006 census, its population was 137, in 20 families.
