= Beyuz =

Beyuz or Boyuz (Persian: بيوض) may refer to:

- Beyuz, Esmailiyeh
- Beyuz, Gheyzaniyeh
- Beyuz-e Yek
