= Yaribieh =

Yaribieh يربيعي
- Village
- Location within Iran
- Coordinates: 31°06′01″N 49°09′07″E
- Country: Iran
- Province: Khuzestan
- County: Ahvaz
- Bakhsh: Central
- Rural District: Gheyzaniyeh

Population (2006)
  - Total: 21
- Time zone: UTC+3:30 (IRST)
  - Summer (DST): UTC+4:30 (IRDT)

Yaribieh (Persian: يربيعي, also Romanized as Yaribi‘eh; also known as Yorbī‘ī, Yorebey‘ī, Yowrabī‘eh, and Yowraybīyeh) is a village in Gheyzaniyeh Rural District, in the Central District of Ahvaz County, Khuzestan Province, Iran. At the 2006 census, its population was 21, in 4 families.
