= Albaji =

Albaji الباجي
- Village
- Location within Iran
- Coordinates: 31°30′45″N 48°37′57″E
- Country: Iran
- Province: Khuzestan
- County: Ahvaz
- Bakhsh: Central
- Rural District: Elhayi

Population (2006)
  - Total: 1,867
- Time zone: UTC+3:30 (IRST)
  - Summer (DST): UTC+4:30 (IRDT)

Albaji (Persian: الباجي, also Romanized as Albājī and Ālbājī; also known as Albājī-ye Jadīd, Kamp-e Albājī, and Labājī) is a village in Elhayi Rural District, in the Central District of Ahvaz County, Khuzestan Province, Iran. At the 2006 census, its population was 1,867, in 316 families.
