= Madinat =

Madinat مدنيات
- Village
- Location within Iran
- Coordinates: 31°04′27″N 48°56′33″E
- Country: Iran
- Province: Khuzestan
- County: Ahvaz
- Bakhsh: Central
- Rural District: Mosharrahat

Population (2006)
  - Total: 267
- Time zone: UTC+3:30 (IRST)
  - Summer (DST): UTC+4:30 (IRDT)

Madinat (Persian: مدنيات, also Romanized as Madīnāt; also known as ‘Arab Nāşer, Madīnāt Shameh, and Mudāināth) is a village in Mosharrahat Rural District, in the Central District of Ahvaz County, Khuzestan Province, Iran. At the 2006 census, its population was 267, in 39 families.
