= Aniyyat =

Village in Khuzestan province, Iran

Aniyyat Persian: عنيت
- Village
- Location within Iran
- Coordinates: 31°13′33″N 48°56′23″E
- Country: Iran
- Province: Khuzestan
- County: Ahvaz
- District: Gheyzaniyeh
- Rural District: Mosharrahat

Population (2016)
  - Total: 90
- Time zone: UTC+3:30 (IRST)

Aniyyat (Persian: عنيت) (Note: Also romanized as ‘Anīyyat) is a village in Mosharrahat Rural District of Gheyzaniyeh District, Ahvaz County, Khuzestan province, Iran.

== Demographics ==
=== Population ===
At the time of the 2006 National Census, the village's population was 83 in 18 households, when it was in the Central District. The following census in 2011 counted 96 people in 19 households. The 2016 census measured the population of the village as 90 in 24 households, by which time the rural district had been separated from the district in the formation of Gheyzaniyeh District.
