= Taheriyeh-ye Do =

Taheriyeh-ye Do طاهريه دو
- Village
- Location within Iran
- Coordinates: 31°15′55″N 48°15′37″E
- Country: Iran
- Province: Khuzestan
- County: Ahvaz
- Bakhsh: Central
- Rural District: Esmailiyeh

Population (2006)
  - Total: 194
- Time zone: UTC+3:30 (IRST)
  - Summer (DST): UTC+4:30 (IRDT)

Taheriyeh-ye Do (Persian: طاهريه دو, also Romanized as Ţāherīyeh-ye Do; also known as Taheriyehé Dowé Mo’allayeh) is a village in Esmailiyeh Rural District, in the Central District of Ahvaz County, Khuzestan Province, Iran. At the 2006 census, its population was 194, in 37 families.
