= Seyyed Zahrav =

Seyyed Zahrav سيدزهراو
- Village
- Location within Iran
- Coordinates: 31°43′21″N 48°32′58″E
- Country: Iran
- Province: Khuzestan
- County: Ahvaz
- Bakhsh: Central
- Rural District: Elhayi

Population (2006)
  - Total: 34
- Time zone: UTC+3:30 (IRST)
  - Summer (DST): UTC+4:30 (IRDT)

Seyyed Zahrav (Persian: سيدزهراو, also Romanized as Seyyed Z̧ahrāv; also known as Seyyed Z̧ahrāb) is a village in Elhayi Rural District, in the Central District of Ahvaz County, Khuzestan Province, Iran. At the 2006 census, its population was 34, in 5 families.
