= Barbugeh =

Village in Khuzestan province, Iran

Barbugeh Persian: بربوگه
- Village
- Location within Iran
- Coordinates: 31°09′46″N 48°52′13″E
- Country: Iran
- Province: Khuzestan
- County: Ahvaz
- District: Gheyzaniyeh
- Rural District: Mosharrahat

Population (2016)
  - Total: 90
- Time zone: UTC+3:30 (IRST)

Barbugeh (Persian: بربوگه) (Note: Also romanized as Barbūgeh; also known as Barbūqeh and Berbāgeh) is a village in Mosharrahat Rural District of Gheyzaniyeh District, Ahvaz County, Khuzestan province, Iran.

== Demographics ==
=== Population ===
At the time of the 2006 National Census, the village's population was 167 in 28 households, when it was in the Central District. The following census in 2011 counted 210 people in 37 households. The 2016 census measured the population of the village as 90 in 22 households, by which time the rural district had been separated from the district in the formation of Gheyzaniyeh District.
