= Zargan-e Karaneh =

Village in Khuzestan province, Iran

Zargan-e Karaneh Persian: زرگان كرانه
- Village
- Location within Iran
- Coordinates: 31°22′15″N 48°45′42″E
- Country: Iran
- Province: Khuzestan
- County: Ahvaz
- District: Gheyzaniyeh
- Rural District: Mosharrahat

Population (2016)
  - Total: 7,744
- Time zone: UTC+3:30 (IRST)

Zargan-e Karaneh (Persian: زرگان كرانه) (Note: Also romanized as Zargān-e Karāneh; also known as Zargān, Zargān Buzurg, Zargān-e Bozorg, and Zargān Garāneh) is a village in Mosharrahat Rural District of Gheyzaniyeh District, Ahvaz County, Khuzestan province, Iran.

== Demographics ==
=== Population ===
At the time of the 2006 National Census, the village's population was 8,938 in 1,721 households, when it was in Veys Rural District of the former Bavi District. The following census in 2011 counted 11,885 people in 2,989 households, by which time the district had been separated from the county in the establishment of Bavi County. The village was transferred to Mosharrahat Rural District of the Central District. The 2016 census measured the population of the village as 7,744 people in 2,424 households, when the rural district had been separated from the district in the formation of Gheyzaniyeh District. It was the most populous village in its rural district.
