= Ramziyeh-e Yek =

Ramziyeh-e Yek رمزيه يك
- Village
- Location within Iran
- Coordinates: 31°15′12″N 48°26′12″E
- Country: Iran
- Province: Khuzestan
- County: Ahvaz
- Bakhsh: Central
- Rural District: Esmailiyeh

Population (2006)
  - Total: 182
- Time zone: UTC+3:30 (IRST)
  - Summer (DST): UTC+4:30 (IRDT)

Ramziyeh-e Yek (Persian: رمزيه يك, also Romanized as Ramẕīyeh-e Yek, Ramzīyeh-ye Yek, and Ramzeyeh-ye Yek; also known as Ramzeyeh, Ramzīyeh, Ramziyehé Yek, and Ramzīyyeh) is a village in Esmailiyeh Rural District, in the Central District of Ahvaz County, Khuzestan Province, Iran. At the 2006 census, its population was 182, in 32 families.
