= Fazleh =

Village in Khuzestan province, Iran

Fazleh Persian: فضله
- Village
- Location within Iran
- Coordinates: 31°12′13″N 49°00′37″E
- Country: Iran
- Province: Khuzestan
- County: Ahvaz
- District: Gheyzaniyeh
- Rural District: Mosharrahat

Population (2016)
  - Total: 77
- Time zone: UTC+3:30 (IRST)
  - Summer (DST): UTC+4:30 (IRDT)

Fazleh (Persian: فضله) (Note: Also romanized as Faẕleh) is a village in Mosharrahat Rural District of Gheyzaniyeh District, Ahvaz County, Khuzestan province, Iran.

== Demographics ==
=== Population ===
At the time of the 2006 National Census, the village's population was 137 in 27 households, when it was in the Central District. The following census in 2011 counted 98 people in 22 households. The 2016 census measured the population of the village as 77 in 24 households, by which time the rural district had been separated from the district in the formation of Gheyzaniyeh District.
