= Rahmaniyeh, Khuzestan =

Village in Khuzestan province, Iran

Rahmaniyeh Persian: رحمانيه
- Village
- Location within Iran
- Coordinates: 31°15′11″N 49°00′19″E
- Country: Iran
- Province: Khuzestan
- County: Ahvaz
- District: Gheyzaniyeh
- Rural District: Mosharrahat

Population (2016)
  - Total: 159
- Time zone: UTC+3:30 (IRST)

Rahmaniyeh (Persian: رحمانيه) (Note: Also romanized as Raḩmānīyeh; also known as Raḩīmīyeh and Raḩmā’īyeh) is a village in Mosharrahat Rural District of Gheyzaniyeh District, Ahvaz County, Khuzestan province, Iran.

== Demographics ==
=== Population ===
At the time of the 2006 National Census, the village's population was 111 in 21 households, when it was in the Central District. The following census in 2011 counted 125 people in 27 households. The 2016 census measured the population of the village as 159 in 39 households, by which time the rural district had been separated from the district in the formation of Gheyzaniyeh District.
