= Avafi, Ahvaz =

Avafi عوافي
- Village
- Location within Iran
- Coordinates: 31°12′56″N 49°12′32″E
- Country: Iran
- Province: Khuzestan
- County: Ahvaz
- Bakhsh: Central
- Rural District: Gheyzaniyeh

Population (2006)
  - Total: 714
- Time zone: UTC+3:30 (IRST)
  - Summer (DST): UTC+4:30 (IRDT)

Avafi (Persian: عوافي, also Romanized as ‘Avāfī; also known as ‘Aveyfī and ‘Avīfī) is a village in Gheyzaniyeh Rural District, in the Central District of Ahvaz County, Khuzestan Province, Iran. At the 2006 census, its population was 714, in 131 families.
