= Taheriyeh-ye Yek =

Village in Khuzestan, Iran

Taheriyeh-ye Yek طاهريه يك
- Village
- Location within Iran
- Coordinates: 31°15′13″N 48°15′49″E
- Country: Iran
- Province: Khuzestan
- County: Ahvaz
- Bakhsh: Central
- Rural District: Esmailiyeh

Population (2006)
  - Total: 61
- Time zone: UTC+3:30 (IRST)
  - Summer (DST): UTC+4:30 (IRDT)

Taheriyeh-ye Yek (Persian: طاهريه يك, also Romanized as Ţāherīyeh-ye Yek; also known as Taheriyehé Yeké Matrood) is a village in Esmailiyeh Rural District, in the Central District of Ahvaz County, Khuzestan Province, Iran. At the 2006 census, its population was 61, in 13 families.
