= Hayaviyeh =

Village in Khuzestan province, Iran

Hayaviyeh Persian: حياويه
- Village
- Location within Iran
- Coordinates: 31°09′54″N 49°03′33″E
- Country: Iran
- Province: Khuzestan
- County: Ahvaz
- District: Gheyzaniyeh
- Rural District: Mosharrahat

Population (2016)
  - Total: 116
- Time zone: UTC+3:30 (IRST)

Hayaviyeh (Persian: حياويه) (Note: Also romanized as Ḩayāvīyeh and Ḩayāvīyyeh) is a village in Mosharrahat Rural District of Gheyzaniyeh District, Ahvaz County, Khuzestan province, Iran.

== Demographics ==
=== Population ===
At the time of the 2006 National Census, the village's population was 183 in 41 households, when it was in the Central District. The following census in 2011 counted 210 people in 37 households. The 2016 census measured the population of the village as 116 in 34 households, by which time the rural district had been separated from the district in the formation of Gheyzaniyeh District.
