= Borvayeh-ye Yusef =

Borvayeh-ye Yusef بروايه يوسف
- Village
- Country: Iran
- Province: Khuzestan
- County: Ahvaz
- Bakhsh: Central
- Rural District: Elhayi

Population (2006)
  - Total: 381
- Time zone: UTC+3:30 (IRST)
  - Summer (DST): UTC+4:30 (IRDT)

Borvayeh-ye Yusef (Persian: بروايه يوسف, also Romanized as Borvāyeh-ye Yūsef) is a village in Elhayi Rural District, in the Central District of Ahvaz County, Khuzestan Province, Iran. At the 2006 census, its population was 381, in 69 families.
