= Seyyed Yaddam =

Seyyed Yeddeyem سيديِديّم
- village
- Location within Iran
- Coordinates: 31°41′52″N 48°41′25″E
- Country: Iran
- Province: Khuzestan
- County: Ahvaz
- Bakhsh: Central
- Rural District: Elhayi
- Elevation: 25 m (82 ft)

Population (2006)
  - Total: 106
- Time zone: UTC+3:30 (IRST)
  - Summer (DST): UTC+4:30 (IRDT)

Seyyed Yaddam (Persian: سيديديم, also Romanized as Seyyed Yaddām) is a village in Elhayi Rural District, in the Central District of Ahvaz County, Khuzestan Province, Iran. At the 2006 census, its population was 106, in 17 families. Its tourist attractions are Seyyed Yeddeyem wetland and Dez River
