= Eyn-e Do =

Village in Khuzestan province, Iran

Eyn-e Do Persian: عين دو
- Village
- Location within Iran
- Coordinates: 31°20′48″N 48°35′57″E
- Country: Iran
- Province: Khuzestan
- County: Ahvaz
- District: Central
- Rural District: Elhayi

Population (2016)
  - Total: 17,653
- Time zone: UTC+3:30 (IRST)

Eyn-e Do (Persian: عين دو) (Note: Also romanized as ‘Eyn-e Do) is a village in Elhayi Rural District of the Central District of Ahvaz County, Khuzestan province, Iran.

== Demographics ==
=== Population ===
At the time of the 2006 National Census, the village's population was 14,226 in 2,543 households, when it was in the former Esmailiyeh Rural District. The following census in 2011 counted 16,007 people in 3,717 households. The 2016 census measured the population of the village as 17,653 people in 4,491 households, by which time the village had been transferred to Elhayi Rural District. It was the most populous village in its rural district.
