= Abaviyeh =

Abaviyeh عباويه
- Village
- Location within Iran
- Coordinates: 31°12′08″N 48°23′03″E
- Country: Iran
- Province: Khuzestan
- County: Ahvaz
- Bakhsh: Central
- Rural District: Esmailiyeh

Population (2006)
  - Total: 23
- Time zone: UTC+3:30 (IRST)
  - Summer (DST): UTC+4:30 (IRDT)

Abaviyeh (Persian: عباويه, also Romanized as ‘Abāvīyeh; also known as ‘Abārīyeh) is a village in Esmailiyeh Rural District, in the Central District of Ahvaz County, Khuzestan Province, Iran. At the 2006 census, its population was 23, in 5 families.
