= Karidi =

Karidi كريدي
- Village
- Location within Iran
- Coordinates: 31°03′02″N 49°09′39″E
- Country: Iran
- Province: Khuzestan
- County: Ahvaz
- Bakhsh: Central
- Rural District: Gheyzaniyeh

Population (2006)
  - Total: 37
- Time zone: UTC+3:30 (IRST)
  - Summer (DST): UTC+4:30 (IRDT)

Karidi (Persian: كريدي, also Romanized as Karīdī' and Kerīdī; also known as Kerendī) is a village in Gheyzaniyeh Rural District, in the Central District of Ahvaz County, Khuzestan Province, Iran. At the 2006 census, its population was 37, in 4 families.
