= Borvayeh-ye Albu Aziz =

Borvayeh-ye Albu Aziz بروايه البوعزيز
- Village
- Location within Iran
- Coordinates: 31°35′23″N 48°37′21″E
- Country: Iran
- Province: Khuzestan
- County: Ahvaz
- Bakhsh: Central
- Rural District: Elhayi

Population (2006)
  - Total: 550
- Time zone: UTC+3:30 (IRST)
  - Summer (DST): UTC+4:30 (IRDT)

Borvayeh-ye Albu Aziz (Persian: بروايه البوعزيز, also Romanized as Borvāyeh-ye Ālbū ʿAzīz; also known as Alborvāyeh, Albū ‘Azīz, Almorāvīyeh, Borvāyeh, and Borvāyeh-ye ‘Azīz) is a village in Elhayi Rural District, in the Central District of Ahvaz County, Khuzestan Province, Iran. At the 2006 census, its population was 550, in 109 families.
