= Khalaf =

Khalaf may refer to:

- Khalaf (name)
- Khalaf (Islam), later generations of Muslims, as distinguished from Salaf
- Al-Khalaf, a village in east-central Yemen
- Khalaf, East Azerbaijan, a village in East Azerbaijan Province, Iran
- Khalaf, Khuzestan, a village in Khuzestan Province, Iran
- Khalaf-e Nabi, a village in Khuzestan Province, Iran
- Khalaf, South Khorasan, a village in South Khorasan Province, Iran
- Halaf, Iran (disambiguation), various places in Khuzestan Province, Iran
