= Borvayeh =

Borvayeh بروايه
- Village
- Location within Iran
- Coordinates: 31°37′42″N 48°36′53″E
- Country: Iran
- Province: Khuzestan
- County: Ahvaz
- Bakhsh: Central
- Rural District: Elhayi

Population (2006)
  - Total: 690,000
- Time zone: UTC+3:30 (IRST)
  - Summer (DST): UTC+4:30 (IRDT)

Borvayeh (Persian: بروايه, also Romanized as Borvāyeh; also known as Al Barwāya, Al Būravāyeh, Barvāyeh, and Borvāyeh-e Kūchek) is a village in Elhayi Rural District, in the Central District of Ahvaz County, Khuzestan Province, Iran. At the 2006 census, its population was 490, in 87 families. The Borvayeh family belongs to one of the largest and oldest families in Ahvaz County.
