= Takhtiyeh =

Takhtiyeh تخيتيه
- Village
- Location within Iran
- Coordinates: 31°13′24″N 48°25′05″E
- Country: Iran
- Province: Khuzestan
- County: Ahvaz
- Bakhsh: Central
- Rural District: Esmailiyeh

Population (2006)
  - Total: 113
- Time zone: UTC+3:30 (IRST)
  - Summer (DST): UTC+4:30 (IRDT)

Takhtiyeh (Persian: تخيتيه, also Romanized as Takhtīyeh; also known as Takhtīyeh-ye Kūchek) is a village in Esmailiyeh Rural District, in the Central District of Ahvaz County, Khuzestan Province, Iran. At the 2006 census, its population was 113, in 15 families.
