= Tall Asvad =

Tall Asvad or Tall-e Asvad or Tal-e Asvad or Tel Aswad (Persian: تل اسود) may refer to:

- Tall Asvad, Ahvaz, Khuzestan Province
- Tall Asvad-e Yek, Ahvaz County, Khuzestan Province
- Tall-e Asvad, Ramshir, Khuzestan Province
