= Eyn ol Zaman =

Eyn ol Zaman عين الزمان
- Village
- Location within Iran
- Coordinates: 31°03′45″N 49°13′22″E
- Country: Iran
- Province: Khuzestan
- County: Ahvaz
- Bakhsh: Central
- Rural District: Gheyzaniyeh

Population (2006)
  - Total: 142
- Time zone: UTC+3:30 (IRST)
  - Summer (DST): UTC+4:30 (IRDT)

Eyn ol Zaman (Persian: عين الزمان, also Romanized as ‘Eyn ol Zamān; also known as ‘Eyn oz Zamān and Eyn Zamān) is a village in Gheyzaniyeh Rural District, in the Central District of Ahvaz County, Khuzestan Province, Iran. At the 2006 census, its population was 142, in 24 families.
