= Khersheh =

Khersheh خرشه
- Village
- Location within Iran
- Coordinates: 31°11′36″N 48°46′47″E
- Country: Iran
- Province: Khuzestan
- County: Ahvaz
- Bakhsh: Central
- Rural District: Mosharrahat

Population (2006)
  - Total: 24
- Time zone: UTC+3:30 (IRST)
  - Summer (DST): UTC+4:30 (IRDT)

Khersheh (Persian: خرشه, also Romanized as Kharshah; also known as Khorūshīd, and Khorūsīyeh) is a village in Mosharrahat Rural District, in the Central District of Ahvaz County, Khuzestan Province, Iran. At the 2006 census, its population was 24, in 4 families.
