= Borvayeh-ye Omeyr =

Borvayeh-ye Omeyr بروايه عمير
- Village
- Location within Iran
- Coordinates: 31°37′02″N 48°35′42″E
- Country: Iran
- Province: Khuzestan
- County: Ahvaz
- Bakhsh: Central
- Rural District: Elhayi

Population (2006)
  - Total: 584
- Time zone: UTC+3:30 (IRST)
  - Summer (DST): UTC+4:30 (IRDT)

Borvayeh-ye Omeyr (Persian: بروايه عمير, also Romanized as Borvāyeh-ye ‘Omeyr and Borvāyeh-e ‘Omar) is a village in Elhayi Rural District, in the Central District of Ahvaz County, Khuzestan Province, Iran. At the 2006 census, its population was 584, in 109 families.
