= Kazemi-ye Yek =

Kazemi-ye Yek كاظمي يك
- Village
- Location within Iran
- Coordinates: 31°00′27″N 48°22′04″E
- Country: Iran
- Province: Khuzestan
- County: Ahvaz
- Bakhsh: Central
- Rural District: Esmailiyeh

Population (2006)
  - Total: 498
- Time zone: UTC+3:30 (IRST)
  - Summer (DST): UTC+4:30 (IRDT)

Kazemi-ye Yek (Persian: كاظمي يك, also Romanized as Kāz̧emī-ye Yek; also known as Kāz̧emī and Kazemi Ebadi) is a village in Esmailiyeh Rural District, in the Central District of Ahvaz County, Khuzestan Province, Iran. At the 2006 census, its population was 498, in 87 families.
