= Omm ol Tarfeh =

Village in Khuzestan province, Iran

Omm ol Tarfeh Persian: ام الطرفه
- Village
- Location within Iran
- Coordinates: 31°12′10″N 48°49′00″E
- Country: Iran
- Province: Khuzestan
- County: Ahvaz
- District: Gheyzaniyeh
- Rural District: Mosharrahat

Population (2016)
  - Total: 151
- Time zone: UTC+3:30 (IRST)

Omm ol Tarfeh (Persian: ام الطرفه) (Note: Also romanized as Omm ol Ţarfeh and Omm oţ Ţorfeh; also known as Moţrafeh and Mutarfa) is a village in Mosharrahat Rural District of Gheyzaniyeh District, Ahvaz County, Khuzestan province, Iran.

== Demographics ==
=== Population ===
At the time of the 2006 National Census, the village's population was 189 in 31 households, when it was in the Central District. The following census in 2011 counted 127 people in 29 households. The 2016 census measured the population of the village as 151 in 34 households, by which time the rural district had been separated from the district in the formation of Gheyzaniyeh District.
