= Seyyed Taher =

Seyyed Taher سيدظاهر
- Village
- Location within Iran
- Coordinates: 31°42′46″N 48°41′07″E
- Country: Iran
- Province: Khuzestan
- County: Ahvaz
- Bakhsh: Central
- Rural District: Elhayi

Population (2006)
  - Total: 150
- Time zone: UTC+3:30 (IRST)
  - Summer (DST): UTC+4:30 (IRDT)

Seyyed zaher (Persian: سيدظاهر, also Romanized as Seyyed zāher; also known as Seyyed Z̧āher) is a village in Elhayi Rural District, in the Central District of Ahvaz County, Khuzestan Province, Iran. At the 2006 census, its population was 150, in 32 families.
