= Geraiyeh =

Geraiyeh گراييه
- Village
- Location within Iran
- Coordinates: 31°14′46″N 49°05′10″E
- Country: Iran
- Province: Khuzestan
- County: Ahvaz
- Bakhsh: Central
- Rural District: Gheyzaniyeh

Population (2006)
  - Total: 151
- Time zone: UTC+3:30 (IRST)
  - Summer (DST): UTC+4:30 (IRDT)

Geraiyeh (Persian: گراييه, also Romanized as Gerā’īyeh and Garā‘īyeh) is a village in Gheyzaniyeh Rural District, in the Central District of Ahvaz County, Khuzestan Province, Iran. At the 2006 census, its population was 151, in 27 families.
