= Shahrak-e Shahid Ali Chaab =

Shahrak-e Shahid Ali Chaab شهرك شهيدعلي چعب
- Village
- Country: Iran
- Province: Khuzestan
- County: Ahvaz
- Bakhsh: Central
- Rural District: Elhayi

Population (2006)
  - Total: 103
- Time zone: UTC+3:30 (IRST)
  - Summer (DST): UTC+4:30 (IRDT)

Shahrak-e Shahid Ali Chaab (Persian: شهرك شهيدعلي چعب, also Romanized as Shahrak-e Shahīd ʿAlī Chaʿab) is a village in Elhayi Rural District, in the Central District of Ahvaz County, Khuzestan Province, Iran. In the 2006 census its population was 103, with 21 families.
