= Avifi =

Avifi عويفي
- Village
- Location within Iran
- Coordinates: 31°13′37″N 49°13′51″E
- Country: Iran
- Province: Khuzestan
- County: Ahvaz
- Bakhsh: Central
- Rural District: Gheyzaniyeh

Population (2006)
  - Total: 162
- Time zone: UTC+3:30 (IRST)
  - Summer (DST): UTC+4:30 (IRDT)

Avifi (Persian: عويفي, also Romanized as ‘Avīfī) is a village in Gheyzaniyeh Rural District, in the Central District of Ahvaz County, Khuzestan Province, Iran. At the 2006 census, its population was 162, in 22 families.
