= Em Agaleh Seyyed Sabus =

Em Agaleh Seyyed Sabus ام عگله سيدسبوس
- Village
- Country: Iran
- Province: Khuzestan
- County: Ahvaz
- Bakhsh: Central
- Rural District: Elhayi

Population (2006)
  - Total: 104
- Time zone: UTC+3:30 (IRST)
  - Summer (DST): UTC+4:30 (IRDT)

Em Agaleh Seyyed Sabus (Persian: ام عگله سيدسبوس, also Romanized as Em ʿAgaleh Seyyed Sabūs) is a village in Elhayi Rural District, in the Central District of Ahvaz County, Khuzestan Province, Iran. At the 2006 census, its population was 104, in 18 families.
