= Maliget =

Maliget ملي گت
- Village
- Location within Iran
- Coordinates: 31°11′36″N 48°58′20″E
- Country: Iran
- Province: Khuzestan
- County: Ahvaz
- Bakhsh: Central
- Rural District: Mosharrahat

Population (2006)
  - Total: 432
- Time zone: UTC+3:30 (IRST)
  - Summer (DST): UTC+4:30 (IRDT)

Maliget (Persian: ملي گت, also Romanized as Malīget; also known as Malikat and Melīgeyt) is a village in Mosharrahat Rural District, in the Central District of Ahvaz County, Khuzestan Province, Iran. At the 2006 census, its population was 432, in 81 families.
