= Man Seyr =

Village in Khuzestan province, Iran

Man Seyr Persian: منثير
- Village
- Location within Iran
- Coordinates: 31°08′38″N 48°50′30″E
- Country: Iran
- Province: Khuzestan
- County: Ahvaz
- District: Gheyzaniyeh
- Rural District: Mosharrahat

Population (2016)
  - Total: 19
- Time zone: UTC+3:30 (IRST)

Man Seyr (Persian: منثير) (Note: Also romanized as Man S̱eyr; also known as Man Sar, Manīzh, Mensar, Monīr, and Munnīr) is a village in Mosharrahat Rural District of Gheyzaniyeh District, Ahvaz County, Khuzestan province, Iran.

== Demographics ==
=== Population ===
At the time of the 2006 National Census, the village's population was 38 in eight households, when it was in the Central District. The following census in 2011 counted 40 people in eight households. The 2016 census measured the population of the village as 19 in five households, by which time the rural district had been separated from the district in the formation of Gheyzaniyeh District.
