= Seyyed Ghazeban Fazeli =

Seyyed Ghazeban Fazeli سيدغضبان فاضلي
- Village
- Country: Iran
- Province: Khuzestan
- County: Ahvaz
- Bakhsh: Central
- Rural District: Elhayi

Population (2006)
  - Total: 36
- Time zone: UTC+3:30 (IRST)
  - Summer (DST): UTC+4:30 (IRDT)

Seyyed Ghazeban Fazeli (Persian: سيدناصر فاضلي, also Romanized as Seyyed Ghaz̤ebān Fāz̤elī) is a village in Elhayi Rural District, in the Central District of Ahvaz County, Khuzestan Province, Iran. At the 2006 census, its population was 36, in 8 families.
