= Seyyed Taher Fazeli =

Seyyed Taher Fazeli سيدطاهرفاضلي
- Village
- Location within Iran
- Coordinates: 31°43′21″N 48°32′05″E
- Country: Iran
- Province: Khuzestan
- County: Ahvaz
- Bakhsh: Central
- Rural District: Elhayi

Population (2006)
  - Total: 147
- Time zone: UTC+3:30 (IRST)
  - Summer (DST): UTC+4:30 (IRDT)

Seyyed Taher Fazeli (Persian: سيدطاهرفاضلي, also Romanized as Seyyed Ţāher Fāz̤elī; also known as Seyyed Ţāher) is a village in Elhayi Rural District, in the Central District of Ahvaz County, Khuzestan Province, Iran. At the 2006 census, its population was 147, in 24 families.
