= Qeyzaniyeh =

Qeyzaniyeh (Persian: قيزانيه) may refer to:

- Qeyzaniyeh-ye Bozorg
- Qeyzaniyeh-ye Kuchak

== See also ==
- Gheyzaniyeh (disambiguation)
