= Mosallamiyeh =

Mosallamiyeh مسلمیه
- Village
- Location within Iran
- Coordinates: 30°56′27″N 49°09′49″E
- Country: Iran
- Province: Khuzestan
- County: Ahvaz
- Bakhsh: Central
- Rural District: Gheyzaniyeh

Population (2006)
  - Total: 145
- Time zone: UTC+3:30 (IRST)
  - Summer (DST): UTC+4:30 (IRDT)

Mosallamiyeh (Persian: مسلمیه, also Romanized as Mosallamīyeh; also known as Salmiāh, Shammeh, and Shanīmeh) is a village in Gheyzaniyeh Rural District, in the Central District of Ahvaz County, Khuzestan Province, Iran. At the 2006 census, its population was 145, in 26 families.
