= Halaf, Iran =

Halaf (Persian: حلاف) may refer to:

- Halaf 1
- Halaf 2
- Halaf 3
