= Mobeytiheh-ye Seh =

Mobeytiheh-ye Seh مبيطيحه سه
- Village
- Location within Iran
- Coordinates: 31°33′26″N 48°40′33″E
- Country: Iran
- Province: Khuzestan
- County: Ahvaz
- Bakhsh: Central
- Rural District: Elhayi

Population (2006)
  - Total: 47
- Time zone: UTC+3:30 (IRST)
  - Summer (DST): UTC+4:30 (IRDT)

Mobeytiheh-ye Seh (Persian: مبيطيحه سه, also Romanized as Mobeyţīḩeh-ye Seh and Mobeyţīḩeh-e Seh; also known as Mobaitihehé Seh Raykan, Mobeyţīḩeh, and Mobeyţīḩehe Seh Rāykān) is a village in Elhayi Rural District, in the Central District of Ahvaz County, Khuzestan Province, Iran. At the 2006 census, its population was 47, in 8 families.
