= Setamiyeh-ye Bozorg =

Village in Khuzestan, Iran

Setamiyeh-ye Bozorg سطاميه بزرگ
- Village
- Location within Iran
- Coordinates: 31°15′35″N 48°27′12″E
- Country: Iran
- Province: Khuzestan
- County: Ahvaz
- Bakhsh: Central
- Rural District: Esmailiyeh

Population (2006)
  - Total: 396
- Time zone: UTC+3:30 (IRST)
  - Summer (DST): UTC+4:30 (IRDT)

Setamiyeh-ye Bozorg (Persian: سطاميه بزرگ, also Romanized as Setāmīyeh-ye Bozorg; also known as Sattamiyeh and Setāmīyeh-ye Bozory) is a village in Esmailiyeh Rural District, in the Central District of Ahvaz County, Khuzestan Province, Iran. At the 2006 census, its population was 396, in 71 families.
