= Mosharrafeh-ye Bozorg =

Mosharrafeh-ye Bozorg مشرفه بزرگ
- Village
- Location within Iran
- Coordinates: 31°10′30″N 49°14′34″E
- Country: Iran
- Province: Khuzestan
- County: Ahvaz
- Bakhsh: Central
- Rural District: Gheyzaniyeh

Population (2006)
  - Total: 334
- Time zone: UTC+3:30 (IRST)
  - Summer (DST): UTC+4:30 (IRDT)

Mosharrafeh-ye Bozorg (Persian: مشرفه بزرگ, also Romanized as Mosharfeh-ye Bozorg, Mosherfeh Bozorg, Mosherfeh-ye Bozorg, and Moshīrafeh-ye Bozorg) is a village in Gheyzaniyeh Rural District, in the Central District of Ahvaz County, Khuzestan Province, Iran. At the 2006 census, its population was 334, in 61 families.
