= Am ol Deyay-e Do =

Am ol Deyay-e Do ام الدياي دو
- Village
- Country: Iran
- Province: Khuzestan
- County: Ahvaz
- Bakhsh: Central
- Rural District: Gheyzaniyeh

Population (2006)
  - Total: 74
- Time zone: UTC+3:30 (IRST)
  - Summer (DST): UTC+4:30 (IRDT)

Am ol Deyay-e Do (Persian: ام الدياي دو, also Romanized as Ām ol Deyāy-e Do) is a village in Gheyzaniyeh Rural District, in the Central District of Ahvaz County, Khuzestan Province, Iran. At the 2006 census, its population was 74, in 18 families.
