= Chebseh =

Chebseh (Persian: چبسه) may refer to:

- Chebseh-ye Bozorg, village in Iran
- Chebseh-ye Kuchek, village in Iran
