= Beyuz, Esmailiyeh =

Beyuz بيوض
- Village
- Location within Iran
- Coordinates: 31°09′03″N 48°25′55″E
- Country: Iran
- Province: Khuzestan
- County: Ahvaz
- Bakhsh: Central
- Rural District: Esmailiyeh

Population (2006)
  - Total: 81
- Time zone: UTC+3:30 (IRST)
  - Summer (DST): UTC+4:30 (IRDT)

Beyuz (Persian: بيوض, also Romanized as Beyūẕ; also known as Beyūẕ-e Do) is a village in Esmailiyeh Rural District, in the Central District of Ahvaz County, Khuzestan Province, Iran. At the 2006 census, its population was 81, in 14 families.
