= Mobeytiheh-ye Do =

Mobeytiheh-ye Do مبيطيحه دو
- Village
- Location within Iran
- Coordinates: 31°31′27″N 48°40′24″E
- Country: Iran
- Province: Khuzestan
- County: Ahvaz
- Bakhsh: Central
- Rural District: Elhayi

Population (2006)
  - Total: 60
- Time zone: UTC+3:30 (IRST)
  - Summer (DST): UTC+4:30 (IRDT)

Mobeytiheh-ye Do (Persian: مبيطيحه دو, also Romanized as Mobeyţīḩeh-ye Do and Mobeyţīḩeh-e Do; also known as Mobeyţīḩeh, Mobeyţīḩeh-e Do Mīzbān, and Mobitihehé Dow Mizban) is a village in Elhayi Rural District, in the Central District of Ahvaz County, Khuzestan Province, Iran. At the 2006 census, its population was 60, in 11 families.
