= Tall Asvad, Ahvaz =

Tall Asvad تل اسود
- Village
- Location within Iran
- Coordinates: 31°05′59″N 48°20′34″E
- Country: Iran
- Province: Khuzestan
- County: Ahvaz
- Bakhsh: Central
- Rural District: Esmailiyeh

Population (2006)
  - Total: 467
- Time zone: UTC+3:30 (IRST)
  - Summer (DST): UTC+4:30 (IRDT)

Tall Asvad (Persian: تل اسود) is a village in Esmailiyeh Rural District, in the Central District of Ahvaz County, Khuzestan Province, Iran. At the 2006 census, its population was 467, in 83 families.
