= Shoaymit-e Jaber =

Village in Khuzestan province, Iran

Shoaymit-e Jaber Persian: شعيمطجابر
- Village
- Location within Iran
- Coordinates: 30°59′40″N 48°51′31″E
- Country: Iran
- Province: Khuzestan
- County: Ahvaz
- District: Gheyzaniyeh
- Rural District: Mosharrahat

Population (2016)
  - Total: 102
- Time zone: UTC+3:30 (IRST)

Shoaymit-e Jaber (Persian: شعيمطجابر) (Note: Also romanized as Shoʿaymiṭ-e Jāber; also known as Shoeymet Jāber) is a village in Mosharrahat Rural District of Gheyzaniyeh District, Ahvaz County, Khuzestan province, Iran.

== Demographics ==
=== Population ===
At the time of the 2006 National Census, the village's population was 149 in 20 households, when it was in the Central District. The following census in 2011 counted 161 people in 28 households. The 2016 census measured the population of the village as 102 in 21 households, by which time the rural district had been separated from the district in the formation of Gheyzaniyeh District.
