= Mobeytiheh =

Mobeytiheh (Persian: مبيطيحه) may refer to:

- Mobeytiheh 2
- Mobeytiheh 3
