= Mosharrafeh =

Mosharrafeh or Mosharfeh or Mosherfeh or Moshirafeh (Persian: مشرفه) may refer to:

- Mosharrafeh-ye Bozorg
- Mosharrafeh-ye Kuchak
