= Setamiyeh-ye Kuchek =

Setamiyeh-ye Kuchek سطامیه کوچک
- Village
- Location within Iran
- Coordinates: 31°15′36″N 48°28′43″E
- Country: Iran
- Province: Khuzestan
- County: Ahvaz
- Bakhsh: Central
- Rural District: Esmailiyeh

Population (2006)
  - Total: 157
- Time zone: UTC+3:30 (IRST)
  - Summer (DST): UTC+4:30 (IRDT)

Setamiyeh-ye Kuchek (Persian: سطامیه کوچک, also Romanized as Setāmīyeh-ye Kūchek; also known as Sattamiyeh and Settāmīyeh) is a village in Esmailiyeh Rural District, in the Central District of Ahvaz County, Khuzestan Province, Iran. At the 2006 census, its population was 157, in 33 families.
