= Daghagheleh, Ahvaz =

Village in Khuzestan province, Iran

Daghagheleh Persian: دغاغله
- Village
- Location within Iran
- Coordinates: 31°23′23″N 48°41′19″E
- Country: Iran
- Province: Khuzestan
- County: Ahvaz
- District: Central
- Rural District: Lami

Population (2016)
  - Total: 5,116
- Time zone: UTC+3:30 (IRST)

Daghagheleh (Persian: دغاغله) (Note: Also romanized as Daghāgheleh; also known as Dāgheleh and Daqāqeleh) is a village in Lami Rural District (Note: Formerly Anaqcheh Rural District) of the Central District of Ahvaz County, Khuzestan province, Iran.

== History ==
During the Iran-Iraq war, The village of Daghagheleh was home to the 422nd Pontoon Bridge Group, a subgroup under the 411th Combat Engineering Group of Borujerd of the Islamic Republic of Iran Army which supported military operations by enabling infantry, armoured units, and logistics to cross rivers and bodies of water.

== Demographics ==
=== Population ===
At the time of the 2006 National Census, the village's population was 4,876 in 856 households, when it was in Anaqcheh Rural District. (Note: Renamed Lami Rural District) The following census in 2011 counted 5,562 people in 1,279 households, by which time the rural district's name had been changed to Lami Rural District. The 2016 census measured the population of the village as 5,116 people in 1,387 households. It was the most populous village in its rural district.
