= Halaf-e Seh =

Halaf-e Seh حلاف سه
- Village
- Location within Iran
- Coordinates: 31°34′52″N 48°33′53″E
- Country: Iran
- Province: Khuzestan
- County: Ahvaz
- Bakhsh: Central
- Rural District: Elhayi

Population (2006)
  - Total: 433
- Time zone: UTC+3:30 (IRST)
  - Summer (DST): UTC+4:30 (IRDT)

Halaf-e Seh (Persian: حلاف سه, also Romanized as Ḩalāf-e Seh) is a village in Elhayi Rural District, in the Central District of Ahvaz County, Khuzestan Province, Iran. At the 2006 census, its population was 433, in 84 families.
