= Setamiyeh =

Setamiyeh or Sattamiyeh or Settamiyeh (Persian: سطاميه) may refer to:

- Setamiyeh-ye Bozorg
- Setamiyeh-ye Kuchek
