= Shoaymit-e Mandil =

Shoaymit-e Mandil شعيمطمنديل
- Village
- Location within Iran
- Coordinates: 31°00′16″N 48°54′36″E
- Country: Iran
- Province: Khuzestan
- County: Ahvaz
- Bakhsh: Central
- Rural District: Mosharrahat

Population (2006)
  - Total: 30
- Time zone: UTC+3:30 (IRST)
  - Summer (DST): UTC+4:30 (IRDT)

Shoaymit-e Mandil (Persian: شعيمطمنديل, also Romanized as Sho‘aymīţ-e Mandīl, Sho‘eymet-e Mandīl, and Sho‘eymīţ-e Mandīl; also known as Shāmeyāt, Shāmīāt, Sho‘ameyţ-e Qarah, and Sho‘ameyţ-e Qarah-ye Seh) is a village in Mosharrahat Rural District, in the Central District of Ahvaz County, Khuzestan Province, Iran. At the 2006 census, its population was 30, in 7 families.
