= Yoar =

Yoar يعار
- Village
- Location within Iran
- Coordinates: 31°16′16″N 49°15′14″E
- Country: Iran
- Province: Khuzestan
- County: Ahvaz
- Bakhsh: Central
- Rural District: Gheyzaniyeh

Population (2006)
  - Total: 123
- Time zone: UTC+3:30 (IRST)
  - Summer (DST): UTC+4:30 (IRDT)

Yoar (Persian: يعار, also Romanized as Yo‘ār and Ya‘ār; also known as Ya‘ād) is a village in Gheyzaniyeh Rural District, in the Central District of Ahvaz County, Khuzestan Province, Iran. At the 2006 census, its population was 123, in 23 families.
