= Gheyzaniyeh =

Gheyzaniyeh or Ghezaniyeh (Persian: غيزانيه) may refer to:

- Gheyzaniyeh-ye Bozorg
- Gheyzaniyeh Rural District

== See also ==
- Qeyzaniyeh (disambiguation)
