= Hofireh =

Hofireh حفيره
- Village
- Location within Iran
- Coordinates: 31°15′08″N 48°59′16″E
- Country: Iran
- Province: Khuzestan
- County: Ahvaz
- Bakhsh: Central
- Rural District: Mosharrahat

Population (2006)
  - Total: 96
- Time zone: UTC+3:30 (IRST)
  - Summer (DST): UTC+4:30 (IRDT)

Hofireh (Persian: حفيره, also Romanized as Ḩofīreh and Ḩofeyreh; also known as Ḩoteyreh) is a village in Mosharrahat Rural District, in the Central District of Ahvaz County, Khuzestan Province, Iran. At the 2006 census, its population was 96, in 23 families.
