= Khobeyneh =

Khobeyneh (Persian: خبينه) may refer to:

- Khobeyneh-ye Olya
- Khobeyneh-ye Sofla
