= Am ol Deyay =

Am ol Deyay (Persian: ام الدياي) may refer to:

- Am ol Deyay 1
- Am ol Deyay 2
