= Qaleh-ye Sahar =

Village in Khuzestan province, Iran

Qaleh-ye Sahar Persian: قلعه سحر
- Village
- Location within Iran
- Coordinates: 31°40′32″N 48°34′10″E
- Country: Iran
- Province: Khuzestan
- County: Ahvaz
- District: Central
- Rural District: Elhayi

Population (2011)
  - Total: 1,166
- Time zone: UTC+3:30 (IRST)

Qaleh-ye Sahar (Persian: قلعه سحر) (Note: Also romanized as Qal‘eh Saḩar and Qal‘eh-ye Sahar; also known as Qal‘eh-ye Saḩar Alhā’ī) is a village in Elhayi Rural District of the Central District in Ahvaz County, Khuzestan province, Iran.

== Demographics ==
=== Population ===
At the time of the 2006 National Census, the village's population was 801 in 129 households. The following census in 2011 counted 1,166 people in 284 households.

After the census, the village of Elhayi merged with Qaleh-ye Sahar and was elevated to the status of a city. In 2019, Qaleh-ye Sahar was separated from the city and once again designated as a village.
