= Nezeheh =

Village in Khuzestan province, Iran

Nezeheh Persian: نزهه
- Village
- Location within Iran
- Coordinates: 31°14′12″N 49°07′32″E
- Country: Iran
- Province: Khuzestan
- County: Ahvaz
- District: Gheyzaniyeh
- Rural District: Gheyzaniyeh

Population (2016)
  - Total: 2,947
- Time zone: UTC+3:30 (IRST)

Nezeheh (Persian: نزهه) (Note: Also known as Qeyzānīyeh-ye Kūchak) is a village in Gheyzaniyeh Rural District of Gheyzaniyeh District, Ahvaz County, Khuzestan province, Iran.

== Demographics ==
=== Population ===
At the time of the 2006 National Census, the village's population was 2,446 in 473 households, when it was in the Central District. The following census in 2011 counted 2,765 people in 634 households. The 2016 census measured the population of the village as 2,947 people in 689 households, by which time the rural district had been separated from the district in the formation of Gheyzaniyeh District. It was the most populous village in its rural district.
