= Khobeyneh-ye Sofla =

Village in Khuzestan province, Iran

Khobeyneh-ye Sofla Persian: خبينه سفلي
- Village
- Location within Iran
- Coordinates: 31°10′36″N 48°30′54″E
- Country: Iran
- Province: Khuzestan
- County: Ahvaz
- District: Esmailiyeh
- Rural District: Esmailiyeh-ye Shomali

Population (2016)
  - Total: 537
- Time zone: UTC+3:30 (IRST)

Khobeyneh-ye Sofla (Persian: خبينه سفلي) (Note: Also romanized as Khobeyneh-ye Soflá; also known as Khobeyneh-ye Pā’īn) is a village in, and the capital of, Esmailiyeh-ye Shomali Rural District (Note: Formerly Esmailiyeh Rural District) of Esmailiyeh District, Ahvaz County, Khuzestan province, Iran. The previous capital of the rural district was the village of Safheh-ye Yek.

== Demographics ==
=== Population ===
At the time of the 2006 National Census, the village's population was 327 in 63 households, when it was in Esmailiyeh Rural District (Note: Renamed Esmailiyeh-ye Shomali Rural District) of the Central District. The following census in 2011 counted 473 people in 107 households. The 2016 census measured the population of the village as 537 people in 134 households, by which time the rural district had been separated from the district in the formation of Esmailiyeh District and renamed Esmailiyeh-ye Shomali Rural District.
