= Halaf-e Yek =

Halaf-e Yek حلاف يك
- Village
- Location within Iran
- Coordinates: 31°35′32″N 48°33′45″E
- Country: Iran
- Province: Khuzestan
- County: Ahvaz
- Bakhsh: Central
- Rural District: Elhayi

Population (2006)
  - Total: 990
- Time zone: UTC+3:30 (IRST)
  - Summer (DST): UTC+4:30 (IRDT)

Halaf-e Yek (Persian: حلاف يك, also Romanized as Ḩalāf-e Yek) is a village in Elhayi Rural District, in the Central District of Ahvaz County, Khuzestan Province, Iran. At the 2006 census, its population was 990, in 181 families.
