= Beyuz-e Yek =

Beyuz-e Yek بيوض يك
- Village
- Location within Iran
- Coordinates: 31°10′35″N 48°27′44″E
- Country: Iran
- Province: Khuzestan
- County: Ahvaz
- Bakhsh: Central
- Rural District: Esmailiyeh

Population (2006)
  - Total: 454
- Time zone: UTC+3:30 (IRST)
  - Summer (DST): UTC+4:30 (IRDT)

Beyuz-e Yek (Persian: بيوض يك, also Romanized as Beyūẕ-e Yek; also known as Beyūẕ and Boyūz) is a village in Esmailiyeh Rural District, in the Central District of Ahvaz County, Khuzestan Province, Iran. At the 2006 census, its population was 454, in 69 families.
