= Shamariyeh =

Shamariyeh شمريه
- Village
- Location within Iran
- Coordinates: 31°05′59″N 48°20′34″E
- Country: Iran
- Province: Khuzestan
- County: Ahvaz
- Bakhsh: Central
- Rural District: Esmailiyeh

Population (2006)
  - Total: 492
- Time zone: UTC+3:30 (IRST)
  - Summer (DST): UTC+4:30 (IRDT)

Shamariyeh (Persian: شمريه, also Romanized as Shamarīyeh, Shemiriyeh, and Shomeyrīyeh; also known as Tall Asvad-e Yek) is a village in Esmailiyeh Rural District, in the Central District of Ahvaz County, Khuzestan Province, Iran. At the 2006 census, its population was 492, in 85 families.
