= Khobeyneh-ye Olya =

Khobeyneh-ye Olya خبينه عليا
- Village
- Location within Iran
- Coordinates: 31°15′09″N 48°35′12″E
- Country: Iran
- Province: Khuzestan
- County: Ahvaz
- Bakhsh: Central
- Rural District: Esmailiyeh

Population (2006)
  - Total: 19
- Time zone: UTC+3:30 (IRST)
  - Summer (DST): UTC+4:30 (IRDT)

Khobeyneh-ye Olya (Persian: خبينه عليا, also Romanized as Khobeyneh-ye ‘Olyā) is a village in Esmailiyeh Rural District, in the Central District of Ahvaz County, Khuzestan Province, Iran. At the 2006 census, its population was 19, in 4 families.
