= Chebseh-ye Kuchek =

Chebseh-ye Kuchek چبسه كوچك
- Village
- Location within Iran
- Coordinates: 31°32′45″N 48°35′21″E
- Country: Iran
- Province: Khuzestan
- County: Ahvaz
- Bakhsh: Central
- Rural District: Elhayi

Population (2006)
  - Total: 306
- Time zone: UTC+3:30 (IRST)
  - Summer (DST): UTC+4:30 (IRDT)

Chebseh-ye Kuchek (Persian: چبسه كوچك, also Romanized as Chebseh-ye Kūchek; also known as Chepseh-ye Kūchek and Chopseh-ye Kūchek) is a village in Elhayi Rural District, in the Central District of Ahvaz County, Khuzestan Province, Iran. At the 2006 census, its population was 306, in 58 families.
