= Hofireh-ye Hajji Barbeyn =

Village in Khuzestan province, Iran

Hofireh-ye Hajji Barbeyn Persian: حفیره حاجی‌بربین
- Village
- Location within Iran
- Coordinates: 30°56′44″N 49°00′10″E
- Country: Iran
- Province: Khuzestan
- County: Ahvaz
- District: Gheyzaniyeh
- Rural District: Mosharrahat

Population (2016)
  - Total: 338
- Time zone: UTC+3:30 (IRST)

Hofireh-ye Hajji Barbeyn (Persian: حفیره حاجی‌بربین) (Note: Also romanized as Ḩofīreh-ye Ḩājjī Barbeyn; also known as Ḩofeyreh, Ḩofeyrīyeh, and Ḩofīreh) is a village in Mosharrahat Rural District of Gheyzaniyeh District, Ahvaz County, Khuzestan province, Iran.

== Demographics ==
=== Population ===
At the time of the 2006 National Census, the village's population was 535 in 84 households, when it was in the Central District. The following census in 2011 counted 631 people in 121 households. The 2016 census measured the population of the village as 338 in 86 households, by which time the rural district had been separated from the district in the formation of Gheyzaniyeh District.
