= Chebseh-ye Bozorg =

Chebseh-ye Bozorg چبسه بزرگ
- Village
- Location within Iran
- Coordinates: 31°34′44″N 48°34′04″E
- Country: Iran
- Province: Khuzestan
- County: Ahvaz
- Bakhsh: Central
- Rural District: Elhayi

Population (2006)
  - Total: 136
- Time zone: UTC+3:30 (IRST)
  - Summer (DST): UTC+4:30 (IRDT)

Chebseh-ye Bozorg (Persian: چبسه بزرگ; also known as Chepseh-ye Bozorg and Chopseh) is a village in Elhayi Rural District, in the Central District of Ahvaz County, Khuzestan Province, Iran. At the 2006 census, its population was 136, in 25 families.
