= Mosharrafeh-ye Kuchak =

Mosharrafeh-ye Kuchak مشرفه كوچك
- Village
- Location within Iran
- Coordinates: 31°08′39″N 49°13′40″E
- Country: Iran
- Province: Khuzestan
- County: Ahvaz
- Bakhsh: Central
- Rural District: Gheyzaniyeh

Population (2006)
  - Total: 86
- Time zone: UTC+3:30 (IRST)
  - Summer (DST): UTC+4:30 (IRDT)

Mosharrafeh-ye Kuchak (Persian: مشرفه كوچك, also Romanized as Mosharrafeh-ye Kūchak, Mosherfeh Kūchek, Mosherfeh-ye Kūchek, and Moshīrafeh-ye Kūchek; also known as Moshirefehé Dow, and Moshrafeh) is a village in Gheyzaniyeh Rural District, in the Central District of Ahvaz County, Khuzestan Province, Iran. At the 2006 census, its population was 86, in 12 families.
