= Halaf-e Do =

Halaf-e Do Mashaf حلاف دو ماشاف
- Village
- Location within Iran
- Coordinates: 31°34′29″N 48°31′57″E
- Country: Iran
- Province: Khuzestan
- County: Ahvaz
- Bakhsh: Central
- Rural District: Elhayi

Population (2006)
  - Total: 319
- Time zone: UTC+3:30 (IRST)
  - Summer (DST): UTC+4:30 (IRDT)

Halaf-e Do Mashaf (Persian: حلاف دو ماشاف, also Romanized as Ḩalāf-e Do; also known as Ḩalāf, Ḩeyf, and Khalaf) is a village in Elhayi Rural District, in the Central District of Ahvaz County, Khuzestan Province, Iran. At the 2006 census, its population was 319, in 47 families.
