= Shoaymat-e Do =

Shoaymat-e Do شعيمطدو
- Village
- Location within Iran
- Coordinates: 31°28′44″N 48°46′42″E
- Country: Iran
- Province: Khuzestan
- County: Ahvaz
- Bakhsh: Central
- Rural District: Anaqcheh

Population (2006)
  - Total: 76
- Time zone: UTC+3:30 (IRST)
  - Summer (DST): UTC+4:30 (IRDT)

Shoaymat-e Do (Persian: شعيمطدو, also Romanized as Sho‘aymaţ-e Do; also known as Sho‘amyaţ-e Do) is a village in Anaqcheh Rural District, in the Central District of Ahvaz County, Khuzestan Province, Iran. At the 2006 census, the village had a population of 76 people across 15 families.
