= Shoaymat-e Seh =

Shoaymat-e Seh شعيمط سه
- Village
- Country: Iran
- Province: Khuzestan
- County: Ahvaz
- Bakhsh: Central
- Rural District: Anaqcheh

Population (2006)
  - Total: 35
- Time zone: UTC+3:30 (IRST)
  - Summer (DST): UTC+4:30 (IRDT)

Shoaymat-e Seh (Persian: شعيمط سه, also Romanized as Sho‘aymaţ-e Seh) is a village in Anaqcheh Rural District, in the Central District of Ahvaz County, Khuzestan Province, Iran. At the 2006 census, its population was 35, in 5 families.
