= Khalef =

Khalef may refer to:

- Stade Abdelkader Khalef, a stadium that is being constructed in Tizi Ouzou, Algeria

== People with the surname ==
- Mahieddine Khalef (1944–2024), Algerian football manager
- Omar Mahmoud Khalef (born 1990), Iraqi football striker

== See also ==
- Khalaf (disambiguation)
