= Khalaf (name) =

Khalaf is both a given name and a surname.

== Notable people ==
=== Given name ===
- Khalaf al-Bazzar (d. 844), canonical reader of the Qur'an
- Khalaf I (937–1009), Amir of Sistan
- Khalaf Al-Enezi (1952–2022), Kuwaiti politician
- Khalaf Al Salamah (born 1979), Kuwaiti footballer
- Khalaf al-Ulayyan, Iraqi politician
- Khalaf Khalafov (born 1959), Azerbaijani politician
- Khalaf Masa'deh (died 2015), Jordanian lawyer and politician

=== Surname ===
- Abbas Khalaf (died 2013), Iraqi translator
- Abdulhadi Khalaf (born 1945), Bahrani political activist and academic
- Ahmad Ibrahim Khalaf (born 1992), Iraqi footballer
- Farida Khalaf (born 1995), ISIS escapee and author
- Hoda Khalaf (born 1997), Moroccan footballer
- Hevrin Khalaf (1984–2019), Kurdish-Syrian politician and civil engineer
- Karim Khalaf (1935–1985), Palestinian politician
- Khaled Khalaf (born 1983), Kuwaiti footballer
- Riyadh Khalaf (born 1991), Irish media personality / presenter
- Rima Khalaf (born 1953), Jordanian UN official
- Roula Khalaf, editor of the Financial Times
- Salah Khalaf (1933–1991), Palestinian PLO official
- Samir Khalaf (born 1933), Lebanese sociologist
- Umayyah ibn Khalaf, contemporary of Muhammad
