= Ya'ad =

Ya'ad (Hebrew: יעד, lit. Goal/Destiny) may refer to:

- Ya'ad (political party), a defunct political party in Israel
- Ya'ad – Civil Rights Movement, another, unrelated defunct political party in Israel
- Ya'ad, Iran, a village in Khuzestan Province, Iran
- Ya'ad, Israel, a moshav in northern Israel

== See also ==
- Yaad
