= Sakineh =

Sakineh (Persian: سكينه) may refer to:

- Sakineh Mohammadi Ashtiani, Iranian prisoner
- Sakineh 2, a village in Khuzestan Province, Iran
