= Gobeyr-e Yek =

Village in Khuzestan province, Iran

Gobeyr-e Yek Persian: گبيريك
- Village
- Location within Iran
- Coordinates: 31°26′48″N 48°45′20″E
- Country: Iran
- Province: Khuzestan
- County: Ahvaz
- District: Central
- Rural District: Lami

Population (2016)
  - Total: 2,061
- Time zone: UTC+3:30 (IRST)

Gobeyr-e Yek (Persian: گبيريك) is a village in, and the capital of, Lami Rural District (Note: Formerly Anaqcheh Rural District) of the Central District of Ahvaz County, Khuzestan province, Iran.

== Demographics ==
=== Population ===
At the time of the 2006 National Census, the village's population was 1,776 in 439 households, when it was in Anaqcheh Rural District. (Note: Renamed Lami Rural District) The following census in 2011 counted 2,699 people in 678 households, by which time the rural district's name had been changed to Lami Rural District. The 2016 census measured the population of the village as 2,061 people in 588 households.
