= Gobeyr-e Seh =

Gobeyr-e Seh گبيرسه
- Village
- Location within Iran
- Coordinates: 31°26′30″N 48°45′19″E
- Country: Iran
- Province: Khuzestan
- County: Ahvaz
- Bakhsh: Central
- Rural District: Anaqcheh

Population (2006)
  - Total: 1,024
- Time zone: UTC+3:30 (IRST)
  - Summer (DST): UTC+4:30 (IRDT)

Gobeyr-e Seh (Persian: گبيرسه; also known as Gobairé Sehe Shaikh Shaye, Gobeyr, and Gobeyr-e Seh-e Sheykh Shāyeh) is a village in Anaqcheh Rural District, in the Central District of Ahvaz County, Khuzestan Province, Iran. At the 2006 census, its population was 1,024, in 215 families.
