= Gobeyr-e Do =

Gobeyr-e Do گبيردو
- Village
- Location within Iran
- Coordinates: 31°28′11″N 48°46′30″E
- Country: Iran
- Province: Khuzestan
- County: Ahvaz
- Bakhsh: Central
- Rural District: Anaqcheh

Population (2006)
  - Total: 637
- Time zone: UTC+3:30 (IRST)
  - Summer (DST): UTC+4:30 (IRDT)

Gobeyr-e Do (Persian: گبيردو; also known as Gobeyr-e Bozorq, Gobeyr-e Dovvom, and Kūt al Qubair) is a village in Anaqcheh Rural District, in the Central District of Ahvaz County, Khuzestan Province, Iran. At the 2006 census, its population was 637, in 126 families.
