= 1975 Beirut bus massacre =

1975 armed clashes between Phalangist and Palestinian organizations in Beirut, Lebanon

Beirut bus massacre
- Part of the Lebanese Civil War
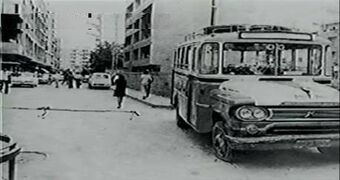
- Image of the scene after the attack
- Location: 33.89°N 35.51°E; Beirut, Lebanon
- Date: 13 April 1975
- Target: Palestinian civilians
- Deaths: 27
- Injuries: 19
- Perpetrator: Kataeb Regulatory Forces
- Motive: Revenge for the Assassination Attempt on Pierre Gemayel

The 1975 Beirut bus massacre (Arabic: مجزرة بوسطة عين الرمانة ,مجزرة عين الرمانة), also known as the Ain el-Rammaneh incident and Black Sunday, was the collective name given to a short series of armed clashes involving Phalangist and Palestinian elements in the streets of central Beirut, which is commonly presented as the spark that set off the Lebanese Civil War in the mid-1970s.

== Background ==
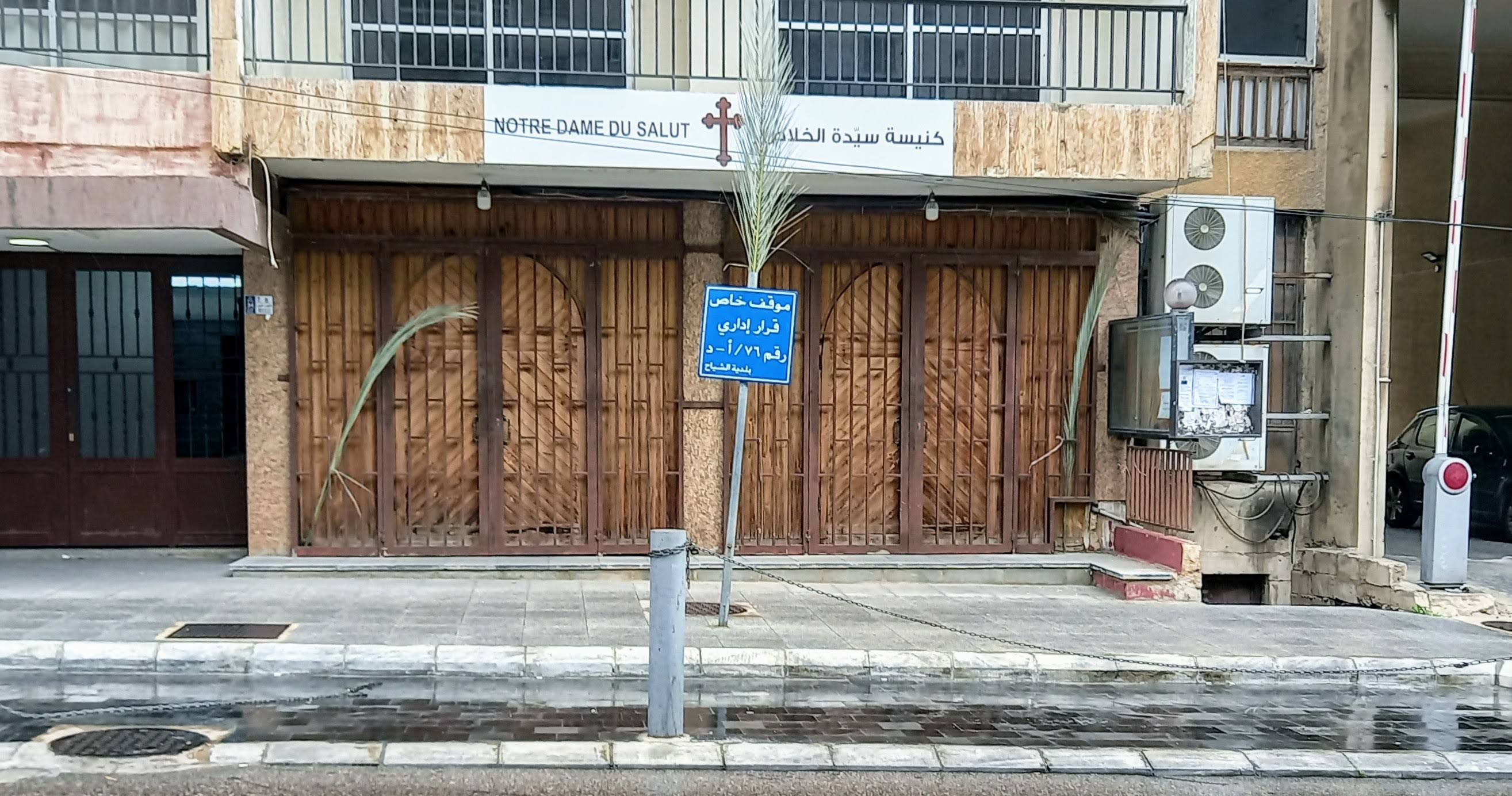
The Church of Notre Dame de la Delivrance, in front of which took place the assassination attempt on Pierre Gemayel.

Early in the morning of April 13, 1975, outside the Church of Notre Dame de la Delivrance at the predominantly Maronite inhabited district of Ain el-Rammaneh in East Beirut, an altercation occurred between half a dozen armed Palestine Liberation Organization (PLO) guerrillas (Arabic: Fedaiyyin) in a passing vehicle performing the customary wavering and firing their automatic rifles into the air (Arabic: Baroud) and a squad of uniformed militiamen belonging to the Phalangist Party's Kataeb Regulatory Forces (KRF) militia, who were diverting the traffic at the front of the newly consecrated church where a family baptism was taking place. As the Palestinians refused to be diverted from their route, the Phalangists tried to halt their progress by force and a scuffle quickly ensued, in which they shot the driver of the PLO entourage.

At 10:30 a.m. when the congregation was concentrated outside the front door of the church upon the conclusion of the ceremony, a gang of unidentified gunmen approached in two civilian cars with posters and bumper stickers belonging to the Popular Front for the Liberation of Palestine (PFLP), a PLO faction, before suddenly opening fire at the church and the individuals present, killing four people.

Among the dead in the drive-by shooting were Joseph Abu Assi, an off-duty Phalange militant and father of the baptised child, and three bodyguards – Antoine Husseini, Dib Assaf and Selman Ibrahim Abou, shot while attempting to return fire on the assailants – of the personal entourage of the Maronite za'im (political boss) Pierre Gemayel, the powerful leader of the right-wing Phalangist Party, who escaped unscathed. The attackers fled the scene under fire by the surviving bodyguards and KRF militiamen.

== Beirut bus massacre ==
In the commotion that followed, armed Phalangist KRF and NLP Tigers militiamen took to the streets, and began to set up roadblocks at Ain el-Rammaneh and other Christian-populated eastern districts of Beirut, stopping vehicles and checking identities, while in the mainly Muslim western sectors the Palestinian factions did likewise.

Believing that the perpetrators were Palestinian guerrillas who carried the attack in retaliation for the earlier killing of the driver, and outraged by the audacity of the attempt on the life of their historical leader, the Phalangists planned an immediate response. Shortly after mid-day, a PLO bus carrying unsuspecting Palestinian Arab Liberation Front (ALF) supporters and Lebanese sympathizers (returning from a political rally at Tel el-Zaatar held by the Popular Front for the Liberation of Palestine – General Command (PFLP-GC) passed through Ain el-Rammaneh on its way to Sabra refugee camp. As the bus drove through the narrow street alleys, it fell into an ambush by a squad of Phalange KRF militiamen. The Phalangists promptly fired upon the vehicle, killing 27 and wounding 19 of its passengers, including the driver. According to sociologist Samir Khalaf all 28 passengers were killed, although other sources stated that 22 PLO members were shot dead by the Phalangists.

== Aftermath ==
The Bus Massacre incited long-standing sectarian hatred and mistrust. It sparked heavy fighting throughout the country between Kataeb Regulatory Forces militiamen and the Palestinian Fedaiyyin and their leftist allies of the Lebanese National Movement (LNM) alliance, resulting in over 300 dead in just three days.

The recently appointed Lebanese prime-minister, the Sunni Muslim Rashid al-Sulh, tried to defuse the situation the following day by sending in a Gendarmerie detachment from the Lebanese Internal Security Forces (ISF) to Ain el-Rammaneh, which detained a number of suspects. In addition, Prime-Minister Sulh tried to pressure Phalangist Party' President Pierre Gemayel to hand over to the authorities the Phalangist KRF militiamen responsible for the death of the Palestinian driver. Gemayel publicly refused however, hinting that he and his Party would no longer abide by the authority of the government. He later sent a Phalangist delegation on a mission to secure the release of the previously detained suspects held in custody by the Lebanese authorities, stating that the individuals involved in the incident were just defending themselves and that no charges could be pressed against them.

As news of the murders spread, armed clashes between PLO guerrilla factions and other Christian militias erupted throughout the Lebanese Capital. Soon Lebanese National Movement (LNM) militias entered the fray alongside the Palestinians. Numerous ceasefires and political talks held through international mediation proved fruitless. Sporadic violence escalated into a full-fledged civil war over the next two years, known as the 1975–77 phase of the Lebanese Civil War, in which 60,000 people lost their lives and split Lebanon along factional and sectarian lines for another 15 years.

=== Later controversy ===
The chain of events that led to the Ain el-Rammaneh church shooting and the subsequent "Bus massacre" (or "Black Sunday") of April 1975 have been the subject of intense speculation and heated debate in Lebanon since the end of the Civil War in 1990. There are two conflicting versions of what happened that day, with the Phalangists describing it as an act of self-defense by insisting that the bus carried armed ALF guerrilla reinforcements firing weapons. The Phalangists anticipated such a reaction by guarding the church, and in the ensuing shoot-out they claimed to have killed 14 Palestinian Fedaiyyin.

Although most PLO accounts refute this version of the events by describing the bus passengers as civilian families' victims of an unprovoked attack and not fully armed guerrillas, Abd al-Rahim Ahmad of the ALF did confirm years later that some of them were off-duty members of that faction. Another high-ranking PLO official, Abu Iyad, later suggested that the incident was not the responsibility of the Phalange, but rather a deliberate provocation engineered by the National Liberal Party (NLP), a predominantly Christian conservative Party led by former President Camille Chamoun. Other Palestinian leaders suspected instead that the provocateurs were the Phalangists.

The bus was later found and exhibited in mid-2011. For the 50th anniversary of the civil war in 2025, the bus was exhibited in the Nabu Museum.

== See also ==
- Bashir Gemayel
- Pierre Gemayel
- Lebanese Front
- Lebanese Civil War
- Lebanese National Movement
- Tigers Militia
- Syrian Social Nationalist Party in Lebanon
- National Liberal Party
- Kataeb Party
- Kataeb Regulatory Forces
- List of extrajudicial killings and political violence in Lebanon

== Bibliography ==
- Abu Iyad (Salah Khalaf, with Eric Rouleau), My Home, My Land: A Narrative of the Palestinian Struggle, Times Books, New York 1981. ISBN 0-8129-0936-4
- Adel Beshara, The Politics of Frustration - The Failed Coup of 1961, Routledge 2013. ISBN 978-1-136-00614-2 –
- David Hirst, Beware of small states: Lebanon, battleground of the Middle East, Nation Books, 2011. ISBN 978-1568586571, 1568586574
- Denise Ammoun, Histoire du Liban contemporain: Tome 2 1943–1990, Éditions Fayard, Paris 2005. ISBN 978-2-213-61521-9 (in French) –
- Edgar O'Ballance, Civil War in Lebanon, 1975–92, Palgrave Macmillan, London 1998. ISBN 0-333-72975-7
- Farid El-Kazen, The Breakdown of the State in Lebanon 1967-1976, I.B. Tauris, London 2000. ISBN 0-674-08105-6 –
- Jean Sarkis, Histoire de la guerre du Liban, Presses Universitaires de France – PUF, Paris 1993. ISBN 978-2-13-045801-2 (in French)
- John Laffin, The War of Desperation: Lebanon 1982-85, Osprey Publishing Ltd, London 1985. ISBN 0 85045 603 7
- Matthew S. Gordon, The Gemayels (World Leaders Past & Present), Chelsea House Publishers, 1988. ISBN 1-55546-834-9
- Naomi Joy Weinberger, Syrian Intervention in Lebanon: The 1975–76 Civil War, Oxford University Press, Oxford 1986. ISBN 978-0195040104, 0195040104
- Rex Brynen, Sanctuary and Survival: the PLO in Lebanon, Boulder: Westview Press, Oxford 1990. ISBN 0 86187 123 5 –
- Robert Fisk, Pity the Nation: Lebanon at War, London: Oxford University Press, (3rd ed. 2001). ISBN 0-19-280130-9 –
- Paul Jureidini, R. D. McLaurin, and James Price, Military operations in selected Lebanese built-up areas, 1975-1978, Aberdeen, MD: U.S. Army Human Engineering Laboratory, Aberdeen Proving Ground, Technical Memorandum 11-79, June 1979.
- Samuel M. Katz, Lee E. Russel & Ron Volstad, Armies in Lebanon 1982–84, Men-at-Arms series 165, Osprey Publishing Ltd, London 1985. ISBN 0-85045-602-9
- Samir Kassir, La Guerre du Liban: De la dissension nationale au conflit régional, Éditions Karthala/CERMOC, Paris 1994. ISBN 978-2865374991 (in French)
- Samir Khalaf, Civil and Uncivil Violence in Lebanon: A History of the Internationalization of Human Contact, Columbia University Press, New York 2002. ISBN 978-0231124768, 0231124767
- Thomas Collelo (ed.), Lebanon: a country study, Library of Congress, Federal Research Division, Headquarters, Department of the Army (DA Pam 550-24), Washington D.C., December 1987 (Third edition 1989). –
- William W. Harris, Faces of Lebanon: Sects, Wars, and Global Extensions, Princeton Series on the Middle East, Markus Wiener Publishers, Princeton 1997. ISBN 978-1558761155, 1-55876-115-2
