= Salmiah =

Salmiah may refer to:

- Al-Salmiya SC, Kuwaiti soccer team
- Salmiah, Iran, a village in Khuzestan Province, Iran
