= Gheyzaniyeh-ye Bozorg =

Village in Khuzestan province, Iran

Gheyzaniyeh-ye Bozorg Persian: غيزانيه بزرگ
- Village
- Location within Iran
- Coordinates: 31°13′16″N 49°10′37″E
- Country: Iran
- Province: Khuzestan
- County: Ahvaz
- District: Gheyzaniyeh
- Rural District: Gheyzaniyeh

Population (2016)
  - Total: 2,794
- Time zone: UTC+3:30 (IRST)

Gheyzaniyeh-ye Bozorg (Persian: غيزانيه بزرگ) (Note: Also romanized as Gheyzānīyeh-ye Bozorg; also known as Gheyzānīyeh, Ghezānīyeh, and Qeyzānīyeh-ye Bozorg) is a village in Gheyzaniyeh Rural District of Gheyzaniyeh District, Ahvaz County, Khuzestan province, Iran, serving as capital of both the district and the rural district.

== Demographics ==
=== Population ===
At the time of the 2006 National Census, the village's population was 2,121 in 350 households, when it was in the Central District. The following census in 2011 counted 2,481 people in 563 households. The 2016 census measured the population of the village as 2,794 people in 750 households, by which time the rural district had been separated from the district in the formation of Gheyzaniyeh District.
