= Gobeyr-e Zahir =

Gobeyr-e Zahir گبيرزهير
- Village
- Location within Iran
- Coordinates: 31°19′31″N 48°22′26″E
- Country: Iran
- Province: Khuzestan
- County: Ahvaz
- Bakhsh: Hamidiyeh
- Rural District: Jahad

Population (2006)
  - Total: 490
- Time zone: UTC+3:30 (IRST)
  - Summer (DST): UTC+4:30 (IRDT)

Gobeyr-e Zahir (Persian: گبيرزهير, also Romanized as Gobeyr-e Zahīr; also known as Gobairé Zahiyeh, Goberḩīyeh, Gobeyr, and Gobeyr-e Zahīyeh) is a village in Jahad Rural District, Hamidiyeh District, Ahvaz County, Khuzestan Province, Iran. At the 2006 census, its population was 490, in 73 families.
