= Lami Rural District =

Rural district in Khuzestan province, Iran

Lami Rural District Persian: دهستان لامی
- Rural District
- Location within Iran
- Coordinates: 31°26′25″N 48°44′33″E
- Country: Iran
- Province: Khuzestan
- County: Ahvaz
- District: Central
- Capital: Gobeyr-e Yek

Population (2016)
  - Total: 15,370
- Time zone: UTC+3:30 (IRST)

Lami Rural District (Persian: دهستان لامی) (Note: Formerly Anaqcheh Rural District (دهستان عناقچه)) is in the Central District of Ahvaz County, Khuzestan province, Iran. Its capital is the village of Gobeyr-e Yek.

== Demographics ==
=== Population ===
At the time of the 2006 National Census, the rural district's population (as Anaqcheh Rural District) was 22,692 in 4,198 households. There were 18,042 inhabitants in 4,323 households at the following census of 2011, by which time its name had been changed to Lami Rural District. The 2016 census measured the population of the rural district as 15,370 in 4,169 households. The most populous of its 21 villages was Daghagheleh, with 5,116 people.
