= Elhayi =

City in Khuzestan province, Iran

Elhayi Persian: الهایی
- City
- Location within Iran
- Coordinates: 31°39′12″N 48°35′46″E
- Country: Iran
- Province: Khuzestan
- County: Ahvaz
- District: Central

Population (2016)
  - Total: 7,651
- Time zone: UTC+3:30 (IRST)

Elhayi (Persian: الهایی) (Note: Also Romanized as Elhāyī, Al Ḩā’ī, Alhā’ī, and Al Hayi) is a city in the Central District of Ahvaz County, Khuzestan province, Iran, serving as the administrative center for Elhayi Rural District.

== Demographics ==
=== Population ===
At the time of the 2006 National Census, Elhayi's population was 3,741 in 546 households, when it was a village in Elhayi Rural District. The following census in 2011 counted 5,103 people in 1,091 households. The 2016 census measured the population as 7,651 people in 1,905 households, by which time the village of Elhayi had merged with the village of Qaleh-ye Sahar and was elevated to the status of a city.
