= 411th Engineering Group of Borujerd =

- گروه 411 مهندسی بروجرد
- Country: Iran
- Branch: Islamic Republic of Iran Army
- Type: Combat engineering
- Garrison/HQ: Borujerd
- Engagements: 1979 Kurdish Rebellion; Iran–Iraq War

Commanders
- Current commander: Col. Mohammad Moradi

411th Engineering Group of Borujerd (Persian: گروه 411 مهندسی بروجرد), also called 411th Combat Engineering Group of Borujerd (Persian: گروه 411 مهندسی رزمی بروجرد) is combat engineering unit belonging to the Islamic Republic of Iran Army. Its headquarters is located near Sarab-e Zarem village, Borujerd County, Lorestan province, Iran.

Some units of the group were involved in the 1979 Kurdish rebellion in Iran. The 411th Group was heavily involved in various operations of the Iran–Iraq War, most notably Operation Undeniable Victory, Operation Jerusalem Way, Operation Jerusalem, Operation Kheibar, Operation Dawn 8, and Operation Nasr 2.

422nd Pontoon Bridge Group of Daghagheleh, Ahvaz is a subgroup of this unit.
