= Esmailiyeh-ye Jonubi Rural District =

Rural district in Khuzestan province, Iran

Esmailiyeh-ye Jonubi Rural District Persian: دهستان اسماعیلیه جنوبی
- Rural District
- Location within Iran
- Coordinates: 31°02′56″N 48°14′37″E
- Country: Iran
- Province: Khuzestan
- County: Ahvaz
- District: Esmailiyeh
- Capital: Beyt-e Vavi

Population (2016)
  - Total: 7,074
- Time zone: UTC+3:30 (IRST)

Esmailiyeh-ye Jonubi Rural District (Persian: دهستان اسماعیلیه جنوبی) is in Esmailiyeh District of Ahvaz County, Khuzestan province, Iran. Its capital is the village of Beyt-e Vavi.

== History ==
In 2012, Esmailiyeh Rural District (Note: Renamed Esmailiyeh-ye Shomali Rural District) was separated from the Central District in the formation of Esmailiyeh District, and Esmailiyeh-ye Jonubi Rural District was created in the new district.

== Demographics ==
=== Population ===
At the time of the 2016 National Census, the rural district's population was 7,074 in 1,630 households. The most populous of its 22 villages was Beyt-e Vavi, with 1,548 people.
