= Nabu Museum =

Lebanese museum

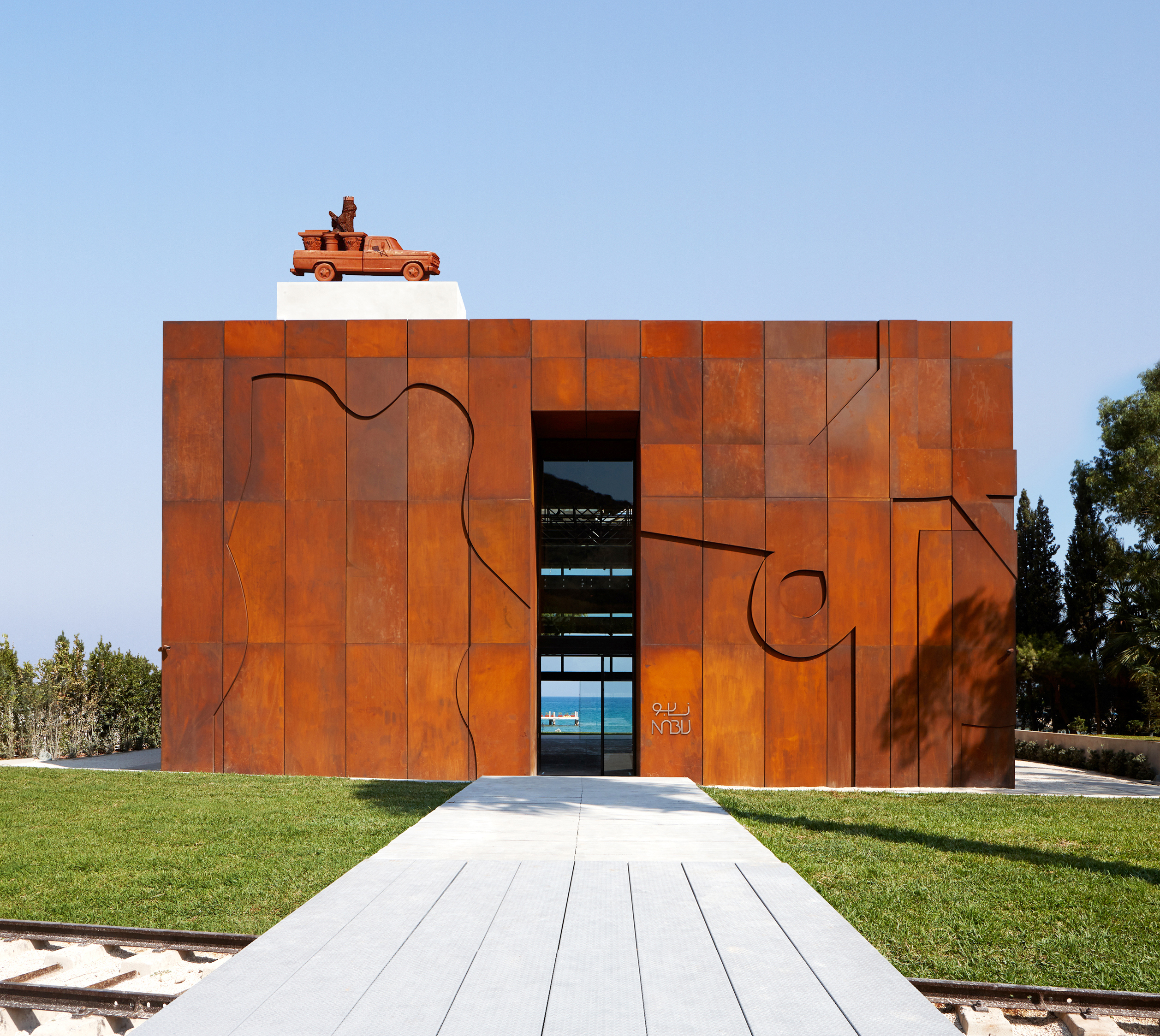
The front facing facade of Nabu Museum

Nabu Museum is an art museum located in El Heri near Chekka, Lebanon. Its collection primarily consists of Bronze and Iron Age artifacts representing Roman, Greek, Byzantine, Phoenician, Mesopotamian, and contemporary Lebanese cultures, as well as manuscripts and ethnographic material. The museum's collections also include local, regional, modern and contemporary art by Lebanese artists. The museum gets its name from the Mesopotamian Patron God of literacy, Nabu.

The structure housing Nabu Museum was built in collaboration with Dia Azzawi, an Iraqi artist and Mahmoud Obaidi, an Iraqi-Canadian artist. The museum was licensed by the Lebanese ministry of culture under decree number 16/2018 on 8 March 2018.

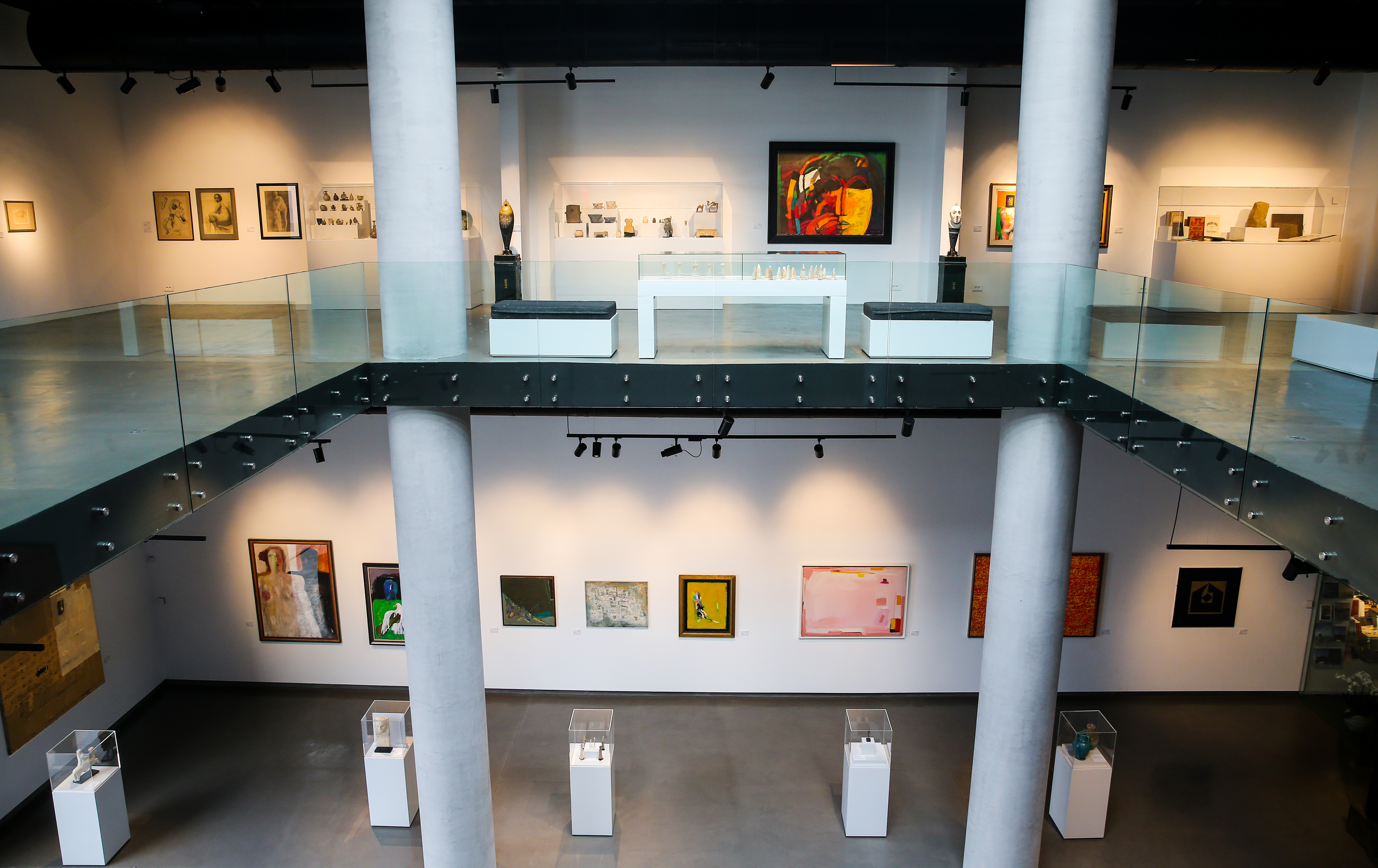
The interior of Nabu Museum showcasing some artwork from previous exhibitions across two floors

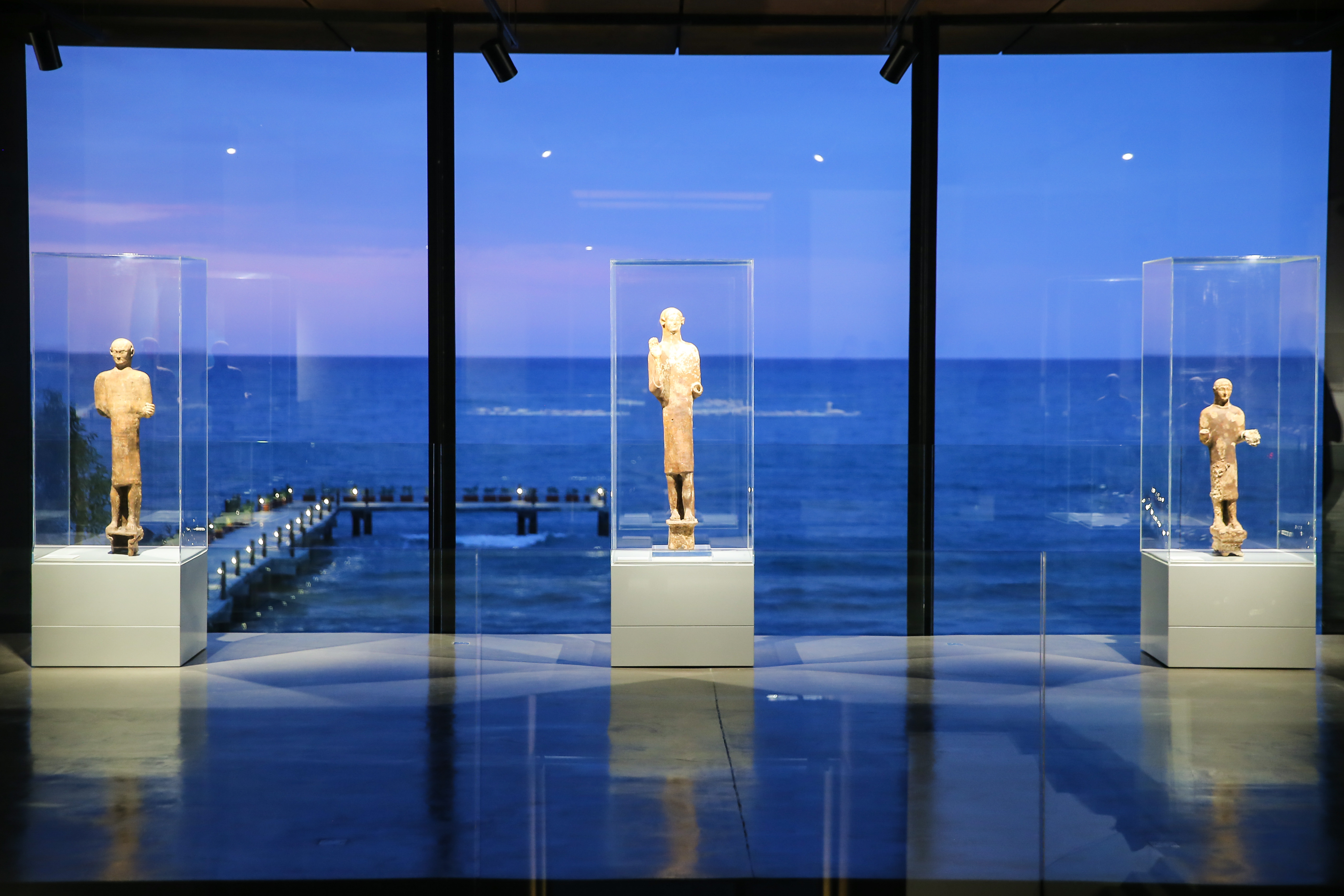
Statues on display at Nabu Museum

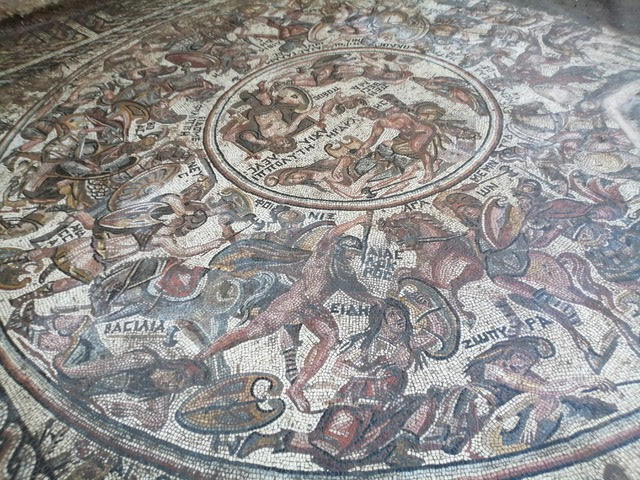
Mosaic discovered in Al-Rastan, Syria

== Al-Rastan discovery ==
Al-Rastan is a city in central Syria where a Roman era mosaic depicting the Trojan wars was uncovered. The mosaic is approximately 20 meters in length and six meters in width, dating back to around 400CE. The property was purchased by Nabu Museum and was donated, along with the expenses of excavation and preservation of the mosaic, to the Syrian directorate of Antiquities and Museums. Dr. Humam Saad, who led the excavation and archaeological research at the General Directorate of Antiques and Museums in Syria stated “it is not the oldest of its kind, but it is the most complete and rarest”.

== Award ==
In 2022, Nabu Museum was nominated for the Agha Khan Award for Architecture. The Agha Khan Award for Architecture is given on a triennial basis to projects that “set the standards of excellence in architecture, planning practices, historical preservation and landscape architecture.

== Repatriation of artefacts ==
Archeological objects from Mesopotamia, including 337 cuneiform tablets were returned to Iraq in early 2022 after Nabu Museum recovered them from various countries around the world. The handover took place at the National Museum of Beirut, Lebanon, in the presence of Nabu Museum representatives, the Iraqi Ambassador to Lebanon, Haydar Chaiyāh Barāk, and the Lebanese Minister of Culture, Abbas Murtada. The Iraqi ambassador stated that “this handover would not have been possible without the good intentions and complete cooperation of the Lebanese government and the director of Nabu Museum”.

== Exhibitions and other cultural events ==
- Millennia of Creativity which ran from September 22, 2018, until June 7, 2019. This exhibition presented archaeological pieces from Nabu Museum's collection. An important body of work by Saliba Douaihy was also displayed.
- Traces of Drawings was an exhibition held between June 15, 2019, until September 12, 2019, that showcased a selection of Lebanese artwork. This exhibition displays works by 35 Lebanese artists from Dawud Corm to Greta Nawfal.

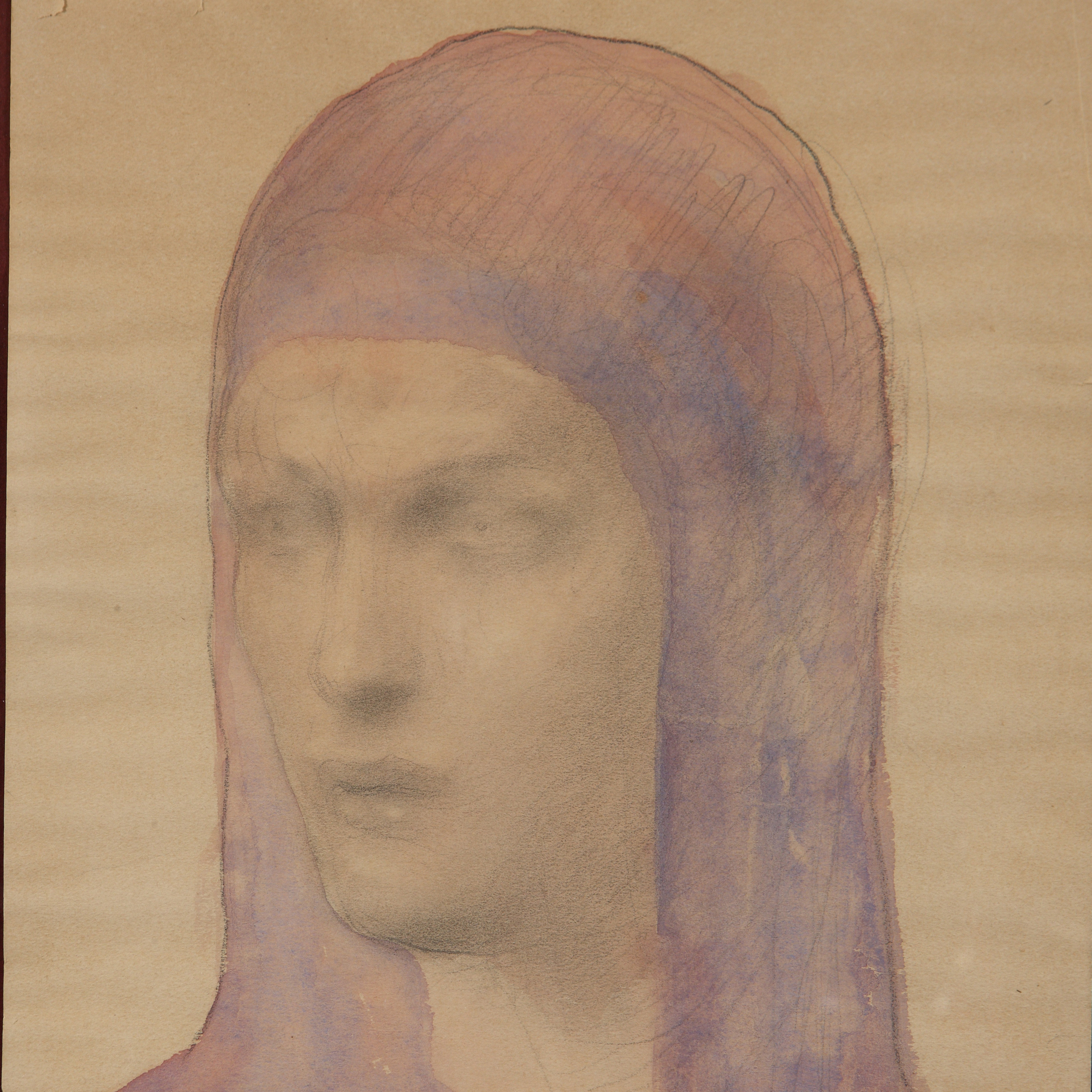
A painting by Khalil Gibran

- Modern and contemporary sculptures from Lebanon: This exhibition ran from September 14, 2019, until September 6, 2020, and it showcased a selection of works by 10 prominent sculptures Zaven Hadichian, Hussein Madi, Naim Doumit, Antoine Berberi, Raffi Tokatlian, Pierre Karam, Rudy Rahme, Anachar Basbous, Nabil Helu and Bassam Kyrillos.

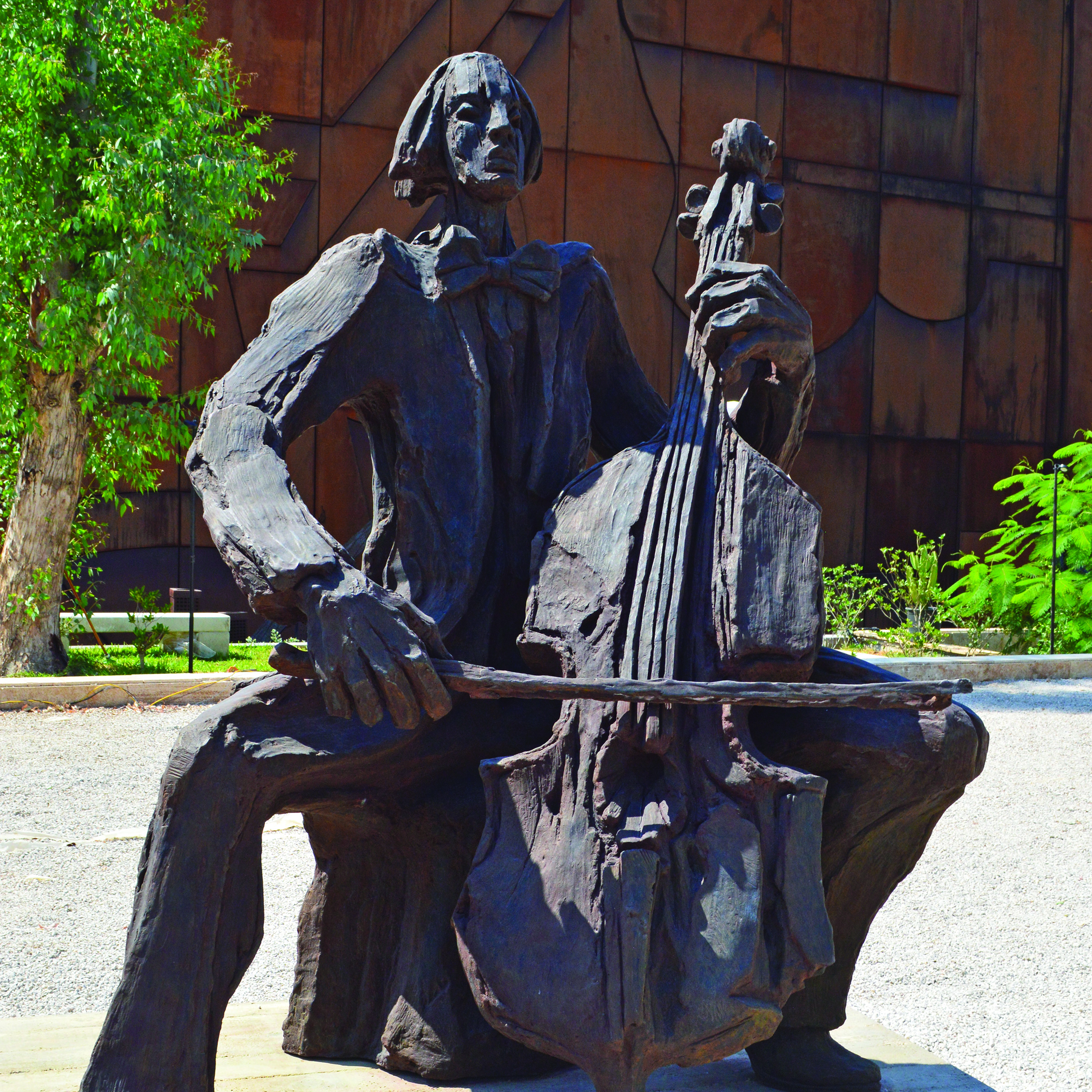
Cellist by Antoine Berberi (2017)

- Hope and despair was an exhibition that was held between Jun 20th and September 20, 2020. This exhibition reflected various forms of expression that occurred during wartime in Syria, Iraq, Lebanon and Palestine.
- The Art Scene exhibition was held between February 5 and November 13, 2022, and exhibited a Lebanon that was divided in its identity between its Phoenician past and the Arabic heritage.
- Batroun: Photo and memory" was an exhibition held between February 5 and November 13, 2022, and it showcased the works of Emile Bulus.
- Beirut (1840-1918): Photographs and Maps: An exhibition held from November 26, 2022, until May 26, 2023.This was a photographic exhibition of Beirut from 1840, the day the first photograph of the city was taken, until 1918, the day the Turkish forces withdrew from the city.
- The Early Arab Press is an exhibition of some of the earliest Arabic language news papers and magazines from around the world. The exhibition is showcasing from 10 June 2023 until 16, September 2023.
- For the 50th anniversary of the Lebanese Civil War in 2025, the museum housed the bus that was attacked in the 1975 Beirut bus massacre that led to the start of the conflict.
