= Tall-e Asvad, Ramshir =

Tall-e Asvad تل اسود
- Village
- Location within Iran
- Coordinates: 30°58′13″N 49°20′19″E
- Country: Iran
- Province: Khuzestan
- County: Ramshir
- Bakhsh: Central
- Rural District: Abdoliyeh-ye Sharqi

Population (2006)
  - Total: 463
- Time zone: UTC+3:30 (IRST)
  - Summer (DST): UTC+4:30 (IRDT)

Tall-e Asvad (Persian: تل اسود, also Romanized as Tal Asvad, Tal-e-Asvad, and Tel Aswad) is a village in Abdoliyeh-ye Sharqi Rural District, in the Central District of Ramshir County, Khuzestan Province, Iran. At the 2006 census, its population was 463, in 77 families.
