= Al-Khalaf =

Coordinates: 14°31′N 49°09′E

- Interactive map of Al-Khalaf
- Country: Yemen
- Governorate: Hadhramaut
- Time zone: UTC+3 (Yemen Standard Time)

Al-Khalaf is a village in east-central Yemen. It is located in the Hadhramaut Governorate.
