= Hofireh-ye Olya =

Hofireh-ye Olya حفيره عليا
- Village
- Location within Iran
- Coordinates: 30°46′46″N 49°30′54″E
- Country: Iran
- Province: Khuzestan
- County: Ramshir
- Bakhsh: Central
- Rural District: Abdoliyeh-ye Gharbi

Population (2006)
  - Total: 136
- Time zone: UTC+3:30 (IRST)
  - Summer (DST): UTC+4:30 (IRDT)

Hofireh-ye Olya (Persian: حفيره عليا, romanized: Ḩofīreh-ye ‘Olyā; also known as Ḩīfereh-ye Bālā and Ḩīfereh-ye ‘Olyā) is a village in Abdoliyeh-ye Gharbi Rural District, in the Central District of Ramshir County, Khuzestan Province, Iran. At the 2006 census, its population was 136, in 22 families.
