= Abbas Khalaf =

Saddam Hussein's interpreter and translator

Abbas Khalaf (born 1955) was Saddam Hussein's personal Russian/Arabic interpreter and translator. He was appointed by Saddam Hussein as the Iraqi Ambassador to Russia. After the 2003 invasion of Iraq he remained in Russia with his family. He died in 2013.

== Quotes ==
- "Many people like to say that he oppressed Shi'ites. I'm a Shi'ite, not from his city, not from his clan. When I hear such things I can say from my own experience that it's an exaggeration."
- "He was just in his injustice to everyone. I mean, if there was any opposition, Shi'ite or Sunni, he crushed it. For him, it didn't matter, Shi'ite, Sunni, Kurd, Arab. If they raised their heads, he put them in their place."

According to The U.S. Government has identified Abbas Khalaf Kunfuth (Kunfuth) as the former Iraqi Ambassador to Russia and a senior official of the former Iraqi regime, as described in Executive Order 13315 and in United Nations Security Council Resolution 1483. Information available to the U.S. Government indicates that Kunfuth may have used his senior position to embezzle funds of the former regime.
