= Khoveyseh, Karun =

Khoveyseh خويسه
- Village
- Location within Iran
- Coordinates: 31°03′31″N 48°52′49″E
- Country: Iran
- Province: Khuzestan
- County: Karun
- Bakhsh: Central
- Rural District: Qaleh Chenan

Population (2006)
  - Total: 221
- Time zone: UTC+3:30 (IRST)
  - Summer (DST): UTC+4:30 (IRDT)

Khoveyseh (Persian: خويسه; also known as Ḩofeyreh, Ḩofeyrī, Ḩofīrī, ‘Ufaireh, and Yofereh) is a village in Qaleh Chenan Rural District, in the Central District of Karun County, Khuzestan Province, Iran. At the 2006 census, its population was 221, in 33 families.
