= Samir Khalaf =

Lebanese sociologist

Samir Khalaf is a Lebanese sociologist. He was born in Beirut on October 14, 1933. Khalaf has written extensively on the Arab world and on Lebanon in particular. His book Heart of Beirut was recognized as a top ten book about Lebanon in 2020. The majority of themes in his work include sexuality in the Arab world, the Lebanese Civil War, Urbanization, and the role of the Protestant missionaries in the Levant. Until 2017, he was a professor of sociology at the American University of Beirut, where he had also been a director of the Centre for Behavioural Research since 1994. He retired in 2017, keeping a part-time teaching position at the University. His prior academic roles included Harvard University, Princeton University, MIT and New York University.

Khalaf received his bachelor's degree in Economics from the American University of Beirut in 1955, and later his MA in Sociology in 1957. Furthermore, he obtained an MA in Economics and Sociology in 1959, and PhD in Sociology in 1964 from Princeton University where he was also a Fulbright scholar. He is married to Roseanne Khalaf with whom he co-authored Arab Youth in 2012.
