= Esmailiyeh District =

District in Khuzestan province, Iran

Esmailiyeh District Persian: بخش اسماعیلیه
- District
- Location within Iran
- Coordinates: 31°07′14″N 48°19′19″E
- Country: Iran
- Province: Khuzestan
- County: Ahvaz
- Capital: Safheh-ye Do

Population (2016)
  - Total: 17,155
- Time zone: UTC+3:30 (IRST)

Esmailiyeh District (Persian: بخش اسماعیلیه) is in Ahvaz County, Khuzestan province, Iran. Its capital is the village of Safheh-ye Do.

== History ==
In 2012, Esmailiyeh Rural District (Note: Renamed Esmailiyeh-ye Shomali Rural District) was separated from the Central District in the formation of Esmailiyeh District.

== Demographics ==
=== Population ===
At the time of the 2016 National Census, the district's population was 17,155 inhabitants in 4,324 households.

=== Administrative divisions ===
Esmailiyeh District Population
Administrative Divisions	2016
Esmailiyeh-ye Jonubi RD	7,074
Esmailiyeh-ye Shomali RD (Note: Formerly Esmailiyeh Rural District)	10,081
Total	17,155
RD = Rural District
