= Mosharrahat Rural District =

Rural district in Khuzestan province, Iran

Mosharrahat Rural District Persian: دهستان مشرحات
- Rural District
- Location within Iran
- Coordinates: 31°06′03″N 48°55′41″E
- Country: Iran
- Province: Khuzestan
- County: Ahvaz
- District: Gheyzaniyeh
- Capital: Mosharrahat

Population (2016)
  - Total: 12,675
- Time zone: UTC+3:30 (IRST)

Mosharrahat Rural District (Persian: دهستان مشرحات) is in Gheyzaniyeh District of Ahvaz County, Khuzestan province, Iran. Its capital is the village of Mosharrahat.

== Demographics ==
=== Population ===
At the time of the 2006 National Census, the rural district's population (as a part of the Central District) was 7,651 in 1,452 households. There were 40,882 inhabitants in 9,215 households at the following census of 2011. The 2016 census measured the population of the rural district as 12,675 in 3,686 households, by which time it had been separated from the district in the formation of Gheyzaniyeh District. The most populous of its 55 villages was Zargan-e Karaneh, with 7,744 people.

== Transportation ==
The closest to Mosharrahat Rural District is Ahwaz International Airport, which is about 22 km away.

== See also ==
Other villages in Mosharrahat Rural District: Abu Kabireh, Aniyyat, Barbugeh, Fazleh, Hayaviyeh, Hofireh-ye Hajji Barbeyn, Koreyt-e Borumi, Man Seyr, Omm ol Tarfeh, Rahmaniyeh, and Shoaymit-e Jaber
