= Gheyzaniyeh District =

District in Khuzestan province, Iran

Gheyzaniyeh District Persian: بخش غیزانیه
- District
- Location within Iran
- Coordinates: 31°08′36″N 49°02′53″E
- Country: Iran
- Province: Khuzestan
- County: Ahvaz
- Capital: Gheyzaniyeh-ye Bozorg

Population (2016)
  - Total: 24,613
- Time zone: UTC+3:30 (IRST)

Gheyzaniyeh District (Persian: بخش غیزانیه) is in Ahvaz County, Khuzestan province, Iran. Its capital is the village of Gheyzaniyeh-ye Bozorg.

== History ==
After the National Census of 2011, Gheyzaniyeh and Mosharrahat Rural Districts were separated from the Central District in the formation of Gheyzaniyeh District.

== Demographics ==
=== Population ===
At the time of the 2016 census, the district's population was 24,613 inhabitants in 6,816 households.

=== Administrative divisions ===
Gheyzaniyeh District Population
Administrative Divisions	2016
Gheyzaniyeh RD	11,938
Mosharrahat RD	12,675
Total	24,613
RD: Rural District
