= Gheyzaniyeh Rural District =

Rural district in Khuzestan province, Iran

Gheyzaniyeh Rural District Persian: دهستان غيزانيه
- Rural District
- Location within Iran
- Coordinates: 31°09′43″N 49°08′52″E
- Country: Iran
- Province: Khuzestan
- County: Ahvaz
- District: Gheyzaniyeh
- Capital: Gheyzaniyeh-ye Bozorg

Population (2016)
  - Total: 11,938
- Time zone: UTC+3:30 (IRST)

Gheyzaniyeh Rural District (Persian: دهستان غيزانيه) is in Gheyzaniyeh District of Ahvaz County, Khuzestan province, Iran. Its capital is the village of Gheyzaniyeh-ye Bozorg.

== Demographics ==
=== Population ===
At the time of the 2006 National Census, the rural district's population (as a part of the Central District) was 11,636 in 2,066 households. There were 11,692 inhabitants in 2,605 households at the following census of 2011. The 2016 census measured the population of the rural district as 11,938 in 3,130 households, by which time it had been separated from the district in the formation of Gheyzaniyeh District. The most populous of its 62 villages was Nezeheh, with 2,947 people.
