= Esmailiyeh-ye Shomali Rural District =

Rural district in Khuzestan province, Iran

Esmailiyeh-ye Shomali Rural District Persian: دهستان اسماعیلیه شمالی
- Rural District
- Location within Iran
- Coordinates: 31°14′43″N 48°24′11″E
- Country: Iran
- Province: Khuzestan
- County: Ahvaz
- District: Esmailiyeh
- Capital: Khobeyneh-ye Sofla

Population (2016)
  - Total: 10,081
- Time zone: UTC+3:30 (IRST)

Esmailiyeh-ye Shomali Rural District (Persian: دهستان اسماعیلیه شمالی) (Note: Formerly Esmailiyeh Rural District (دهستان اسماعیلیه)) is in Esmailiyeh District of Ahvaz County, Khuzestan province, Iran. Its capital is the village of Khobeyneh-ye Sofla. The previous capital of the rural district was the village of Safheh-ye Yek.

== Demographics ==
=== Population ===
At the time of the 2006 National Census, the rural district's population (as Esmailiyeh Rural District of the Central District) was 48,235 in 8,615 households. There were 33,933 inhabitants in 7,632 households at the following census of 2011. The 2016 census measured the population of the rural district as 10,081 in 2,694 households, by which time the rural district had been separated from the district in the establishment of Esmailiyeh District and renamed Esmailiyeh-ye Shomali Rural District. The most populous of its 45 villages was Am Altamir, with 5,004 people.
