= Elhayi Rural District =

Rural district in Khuzestan province, Iran

Elhayi Rural District Persian: دهستان الهائی
- Rural District
- Location within Iran
- Coordinates: 31°32′37″N 48°37′36″E
- Country: Iran
- Province: Khuzestan
- County: Ahvaz
- District: Central
- Capital: Elhayi

Population (2016)
  - Total: 53,008
- Time zone: UTC+3:30 (IRST)

Elhayi Rural District (Persian: دهستان الهائی) is in the Central District of Ahvaz County, Khuzestan province, Iran. It is administered from the city of Elhayi.

== Demographics ==
=== Population ===
At the time of the 2006 National Census, the rural district's population was 17,074 in 2,834 households. There were 22,388 inhabitants in 5,034 households at the following census of 2011. The 2016 census measured the population of the rural district as 53,008 in 13,704 households. The most populous of its 98 villages was Eyn-e Do, with 17,653 people.

== See also ==
Qaleh-ye Sahar, a village in this rural district
