= Ahvaz County =

County in Khuzestan province, Iran

Ahvaz County Persian: شهرستان اهواز
- County
- Location of Ahvaz County in Khuzestan Province (center, purple)

- Location of Khuzestan Province in Iran
- Coordinates: 31°19′N 48°40′E
- Country: Iran
- Province: Khuzestan
- Capital: Ahvaz
- Districts: Central, Esmailiyeh, Gheyzaniyeh

Population (2016)
  - Total: 1,302,591
- Time zone: UTC+3:30 (IRST)

Ahvaz County (Persian: شهرستان اهواز) is in Khuzestan Province, Iran. Its capital is the city of Ahvaz.

== History ==
After the 2006 National Census, Bavi District was separated from the county in the establishment of Bavi County.

After the 2011 census, Hamidiyeh District was separated from the county to establish Hamidiyeh County. Kut-e Abdollah and Soveyseh Rural Districts were separated from the county in establishing Karun County.

In 2012, Gheyzaniyeh and Mosharrahat Rural Districts were separated from the Central District in the formation of Gheyzaniyeh District. Esmailiyeh Rural District (Note: Renamed Esmailiyeh-ye Shomali Rural District) was separated to form Esmailiyeh District, including the new Esmailiyeh-ye Jonubi Rural District. The village of Elhayi was elevated to the status of a city.

== Demographics ==
=== Population ===
At the time of the 2006 census, the county's population was 1,317,377 in 274,296 households. The following census in 2011 counted 1,395,184 people in 351,980 households. The 2016 census measured the population of the county as 1,302,591 in 362,480 households.

=== Administrative divisions ===
Ahvaz County's population history and administrative structure over three consecutive censuses are shown in the following table.

Ahvaz County Population
Administrative Divisions	2006	2011	2016
Central District	1,187,340	1,348,282	1,260,817
Anaqcheh RD (Note: Renamed Lami Rural District)	22,692		
Elhayi RD	17,074	22,388	53,008
Esmailiyeh RD	48,235	33,933	
Gheyzaniyeh RD	11,636	11,692	
Kut-e Abdollah RD (Note: Transferred to Karun County)	91,299	89,477	
Lami RD (Note: Formerly Anaqcheh Rural District)		18,042	15,370
Mosharrahat RD	7,651	40,882	
Soveyseh RD	18,910	19,847	
Ahvaz (city)	969,843	1,112,021	1,184,788
Elhayi (city)			7,651
Bavi District (Note: Transferred to Bavi County)	81,665		
Mollasani RD	7,129		
Veys RD	23,322		
Mollasani (city)	13,979		
Sheyban (city)	23,211		
Veys (city)	14,024		
Esmailiyeh District			17,155
Esmailiyeh-ye Jonubi RD			7,074
Esmailiyeh-ye Shomali RD (Note: Formerly Esmailiyeh Rural District)			10,081
Gheyzaniyeh District			24,613
Gheyzaniyeh RD			11,938
Mosharrahat RD			12,675
Hamidiyeh District (Note: Transferred to Hamidiyeh County)	48,372	46,902	
Jahad RD	6,756	6,003	
Karkheh RD	10,189	9,580	
Tarrah RD	9,450	10,337	
Hamidiyeh (city)	21,977	20,982	
Total	1,317,377	1,395,184	1,302,591
RD = Rural District

== See also ==
Media related to Ahvaz County at Wikimedia Commons
