= Central District (Ahvaz County) =

District in Khuzestan province, Iran

Central District (Ahvaz County) Persian: بخش مرکزی شهرستان اهواز
- District
- Location within Iran
- Coordinates: 31°32′37″N 48°39′13″E
- Country: Iran
- Province: Khuzestan
- County: Ahvaz
- Capital: Ahvaz

Population (2016)
  - Total: 1,260,817
- Time zone: UTC+3:30 (IRST)

The Central District of Ahvaz County (Persian: بخش مرکزی شهرستان اهواز) is in Khuzestan province, Iran. Its capital is the city of Ahvaz.

== History ==
After the 2006 National Census, Bavi District was separated from the county in the establishment of Bavi County. After the 2011 census, Kut-e Abdollah and Soveyseh Rural Districts were separated from the district to establish Karun County.

In 2012, Gheyzaniyeh and Mosharrahat Rural Districts were separated from the Central District in the formation of Gheyzaniyeh District. The village of Elhayi was elevated to the status of a city.

== Demographics ==
=== Population ===
At the time of the 2006 census, the district's population was 1,187,340 in 251,482 households. The following census in 2011 counted 1,348,282 people in 341,617 households. The 2016 census measured the population of the district as 1,260,817 inhabitants in 351,334 households.

=== Administrative divisions ===
Central District (Ahvaz County) Population
Administrative Divisions	2006	2011	2016
Anaqcheh RD (Note: Renamed Lami Rural District)	22,692		
Elhayi RD	17,074	22,388	53,008
Esmailiyeh RD (Note: Transferred to Esmailiyeh District and renamed Esmailiyeh-ye Shomali Rural District)	48,235	33,933	
Gheyzaniyeh RD (Note: Transferred to Gheyzaniyeh District)	11,636	11,692	
Kut-e Abdollah RD (Note: Transferred to Karun County)	91,299	89,477	
Lami RD (Note: Formerly Anaqcheh Rural District)		18,042	15,370
Mosharrahat RD	7,651	40,882	
Soveyseh RD	18,910	19,847	
Ahvaz (city)	969,843	1,112,021	1,184,788
Elhayi (city)			7,651
Total	1,187,340	1,348,282	1,260,817
RD = Rural District
