= Mansoura (disambiguation) =

Mansoura is the capital city of Dakahlia Governorate in Egypt.

Mansoura or (al-)Mansura may also refer to:

== Algeria ==
- Mansoura, Tlemcen, a village in Tlemcen Province, Algeria
- Mansoura, Ghardaïa, a village in Ghardaïa Province, Algeria
- Mansourah, Mostaganem
- Mansourah District (Ghardaïa Province)
- Mansourah District (Tlemcen Province)
- Mansourah District (Bordj Bou Arréridj Province)

== Cyprus ==
- Mansoura, Cyprus, an abandoned village in Cyprus

== Iran ==
- Mansureh-ye Kanin
- Mansureh-ye Mazi
- Mansureh-ye Olya
- Mansureh-ye Sadat

== Libya ==
- Mansura, Libya, a town in Libya

== Morocco ==
- Mansoura, Morocco, a town in Morocco

== Pakistan ==
- Mansoorah, Lahore, a suburb of Lahore, headquarters of Jamat-e-Islami.

== Palestine ==
Depopulated during the 1948 Arab-Israeli War

- Al-Mansura, Acre, 29 km northeast of Acre
- Al-Mansura, Khirbat, 18.5 km southeast of Haifa
- Al-Mansura, Ramla, 10 km south of Ramle
- Al-Mansura, Safad, 31 km northeast of Safad
- Mansurat al-Khayt, 11.5 km east of Safad
- Al-Mansura, Tiberias, 16 kilometres northwest of Tiberias

== Qatar ==
- Al Mansoura (Doha), a district of Doha Municipality

== Saudi-Arabia ==
- Al-Mansorah, Saudi-Arabia

== Spain ==
- Almanzora (disambiguation)

== Syria ==
- Mansura, Hama, a village in Syria
- Al-Mansurah, Raqqa Governorate
- Al-Mansoura, Rif Dimashq
- Mansoura Subdistrict, Raqqa

== Tunisia ==
- El-Mansoura, Tunisia, small Tunisian village near Kelibia
- Mansoura, Tunisia, town situated 8 km from Souassi and el Djem

== United States ==
- Mansura, Louisiana, a town in Avoyelles Parish, Louisiana, United States

== Yemen ==
- Al-Mansoura (Aden), a city district in Yemen

== Historical places ==
- Mansura, Sindh, ruined city near Shahdadpur, Pakistan

== See also ==
- Mansouri
- Mansuri (disambiguation)
- Mansouria (disambiguation)
