= Mansouria =

Mansouria or variants (Persian: منصوريه, Arabic: منصورية) may refer to the following places:

== Iran ==
- Mansuriyeh, Fars
- Mansuriyeh, Isfahan
- Mansuriyeh, Khuzestan
- Mansuriyeh-ye Yek, Khuzestan Province
- Mansuriyeh-ye Do, Khuzestan Province
- Mansuriyeh-ye Seh, Khuzestan Province
- Mansuriyeh-ye Sadat, Khuzestan Province
- Mansuriyeh, Nishapur, Razavi Khorasan Province
- Mansuriyeh, Torbat-e Jam, Razavi Khorasan Province
- Mansuriyeh, South Khorasan

== Other places ==
- El Mansouria, Iraq
- Mansouria, Kuwait
- Mansourieh, Lebanon
- El Mansouria, Morocco
- Mansouria, Tunisia
- El Mansouria district, Yemen

== See also ==
- Mansoura (disambiguation)
- Ziama Mansouriah District, Algeria
