= Mansureh, Iran =

Mansureh (Persian: منصوره), in Iran, may refer to:

- Mansureh-ye Kanin
- Mansureh-ye Mazi
- Mansureh-ye Olya
- Mansureh-ye Sadat
