= Maraveneh =

Maraveneh or Marauneh (Persian: گبير) may refer to:

- Maraveneh 1
- Maraveneh 2
- Maraveneh 3
- Maraveneh 4
