= Yekaviyeh =

Yekaviyeh (Persian: يكاويه) may refer to:

- Yekaviyeh 1
- Yekaviyeh 2
- Yekaviyeh 3
