= Mansuri =

Mansuri (Persian: منصوری) may refer to:

- Manasir (tribe), tribal name of the United Arab Emirates
- Mansuri-ye Jonubi, Bushehr Province
- Mansuri-ye Shomali, Bushehr Province
- Mansuri-ye Vosta, Bushehr Province
- Mansuri, Darab, Fars Province
- Mansuri, Pasargad, Fars Province
- Mansuri, Khuzestan
- Mansuri, alternate name of Mansureh-ye Olya, Khuzestan Province
- Mansuri, Razavi Khorasan
- Mansuri, Taft, Yazd Province
- Mansuri Rural District, in Kermanshah Province

== See also ==
- Mansoori, a Muslim community of north India
- Mansory, a car modification firm
- Mansouri, a surname
- Mansura (disambiguation)
