= Cham Khazam =

Cham Khazam or Chamkhazam (Persian: چم خزام) may refer to:

- Cham Khazam 1
- Cham Khazam 2
