= Amashiyeh =

Amashiyeh or Ammashiyeh or Amasheyeh (Persian: عماشيه) may refer to:

- Amashiyeh-ye Yek
- Amashiyeh-ye Do
