= Jassaniyeh =

Jassaniyeh (Persian: جسانيه) may refer to:

- Jassaniyeh-ye Bozorg
- Jassaniyeh-ye Kuchek
