= Almanzora (disambiguation) =

Almanzora is a city in the province of Almería, Andalusia, Spain.

Almanzora may also refer to:

== Places in Almería, Andalusia, Spain ==
- Almanzora (comarca)
- Almanzora (river)
- Almanzora Valley, in Almería

== See also ==
- Mansoura (disambiguation)
- Mansouria (disambiguation)
