= Kaeydeh =

Kaeydeh كعيده
- Village
- Location within Iran
- Coordinates: 31°33′26″N 48°46′36″E
- Country: Iran
- Province: Khuzestan
- County: Ahvaz
- Bakhsh: Central
- Rural District: Anaqcheh

Population (2006)
  - Total: 363
- Time zone: UTC+3:30 (IRST)
  - Summer (DST): UTC+4:30 (IRDT)

Kaeydeh (Persian: كعيده, also Romanized as Ka‘eydeh, Kaediyeh, and Ko‘aydīyeh) is a village in Anaqcheh Rural District, in the Central District of Ahvaz County, Khuzestan Province, Iran. At the 2006 census, its population was 363, in 74 families.
