= Seyyediyeh =

Seyyediyeh سيديه
- Village
- Location within Iran
- Coordinates: 31°29′39″N 48°48′57″E
- Country: Iran
- Province: Khuzestan
- County: Ahvaz
- Bakhsh: Central
- Rural District: Anaqcheh

Population (2006)
  - Total: 82
- Time zone: UTC+3:30 (IRST)
  - Summer (DST): UTC+4:30 (IRDT)

Seyyediyeh (Persian: سيديه, also romanized as Seyyedīyeh, Sayyediyeh, and Seydīyeh) is a village in Anaqcheh Rural District, in the Central District of Ahvaz County, Khuzestan Province, Iran. At the 2006 census, its population was 82, in 16 families.
