= Okyalos Special Operations Craft =

Class of high-speed boats

Okyalos SOC Ωκύαλος ΣΑΠ
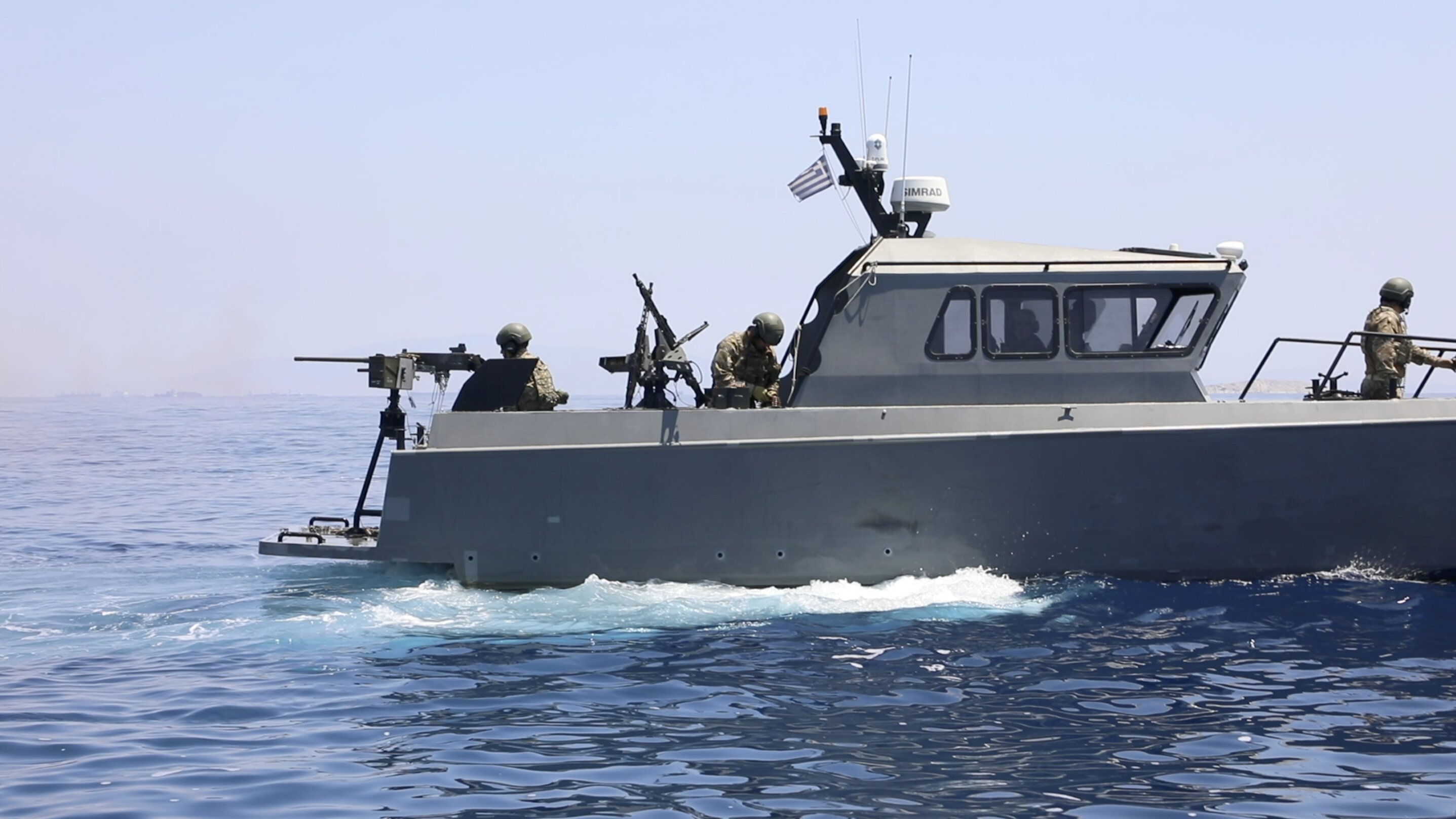
- Hellenic Navy special operators from the Underwater Demolition Command (DYK) during an exercise with an Okyalos craft

Class overview
- Subclasses: Okyalos I; Okyalos II; Okyalos III
- Planned: none
- Completed: 1
- Active: 1

History

(Greece)
- Operator: Underwater Demolition Command, Hellenic Navy
- Builder: ONEX Neorion Shipyards, Ermoupolis, Syros
- Cost: €500'000
- Commissioned: Summer 2015

General characteristics
- Type: Special Operations Craft / fast boat
- Displacement: 11,000 kg
- Length: 15.00 m
- Beam: 3.99 m
- Draft: 0.76 m
- Propulsion: 2 × Volvo Penta D11-670 engines (2 × 670 hp)
- Speed: 50–55 kn; ~45-50 with operational load
- Range: 300 nm
- Complement: 12 (crew & passengers)
- Armament: 0.5 in machine guns; 40 mm grenade launchers
- Aircraft carried: VTOL vehicles; USV; UUV; with EO/IR; LIDAR; COMINT/ELINT payload as per vehicle and mission requirements
- Notes: BV certified

The Okyalos Special Operations Craft (SOC) (Greek: Ωκύαλος) is a class of high-speed aluminum patrol and assault boats designed and built in Greece. It is intended for use by the Underwater Demolition Command of the Hellenic Navy and the Hellenic Army. The craft is designed for rapid insertion, coastal patrol, and irregular warfare missions in closed and open seas.

== Name ==
The name derives from the ancient Greek word ὠκύαλος (ōkýalos), meaning "swift at sea," reflecting its purpose as a fast, maneuverable platform.

== History ==
The Okyalos project began in the early 2010s to provide an indigenous special operations craft for the Hellenic Navy's Underwater Demolition Command (DYK). The prototype was launched in 2014 and underwent sea trials in the Aegean.

Okyalos I was officially delivered to the Ministry of National Defence, with the design and build undertaken entirely by Greek companies. In the summer of 2015, one craft was adopted by the Hellenic Navy, reportedly earning acclaim from special operations officers for its high speed and reliable performance.

The first boat entered service with the Hellenic Navy and Army Special Forces. It was deployed during national exercises such as Parmenion 2019 and has been used in Aegean operations.

ONEX later promoted the design internationally, with presentations to potential partners in the United States in 2016, as well as 2018, where it was presented in Manhattan as a 15-metre fast craft of Greek design and construction.

== Variants ==
Several variants of the Okyalos have been developed with differences in hull design, endurance, and armament:

=== Okyalos I ===
The prototype version, intended for insertion of small commando teams. Armed with pintle-mounted machine guns and grenade launchers. The vessel features an all‑aluminium hull built to European Directive 94/25/EC (amended by 2003/44/EC) and adheres to ISO standards 12215 (structural strength) and 12217 (stability and buoyancy). It measures 13.60 m overall, with a 3.15 m beam and 0.70 m draft; fuel capacity is 1,100 L, with a crew of four. Its performance specifications include a maximum speed of 45 knots, an operational speed of 40 knots, and a range of 300 nautical miles at operational speed. The armament consists of four Browning .50‑caliber machine guns, positioned on the bow, stern, and along the sides of the craft.

=== Okyalos II ===
The Okyalos II variant, introduced in June 2015 after extensive trials, incorporated several design improvements over the prototype, including reduced weight, improved hydrodynamics, enhanced speed, crew capacity, and safety. Built under Greek craftsmanship and Bureau Veritas standards, it was offered in two configurations: a closed superstructure version for 10 personnel (Closed 10) and an open version for 14 personnel (Open 14). The aluminum hull, constructed from 5083 and 6082 alloys, featured a hard-chine deep-V form, spray rails, safety railings, and multiple watertight compartments for propulsion, fuel, storage, and helm. The propulsion system included dual Volvo Penta D11-670 engines, Twin Disc gearboxes, Arneson ASD 11S drive units, and Rolla five-blade surface propellers. The craft could achieve 50–55 knots and had a range of up to 500 nmi in the Open 14 configuration. Electronics included SIMRAD radar, AIS, GPS, a plotter, FLIR thermal imager, and communication systems; the weapon layout featured a paired .50-caliber forward machine gun and two 7.62 mm side-mounted guns.

=== Okyalos III ===
The most recent version, designed with modular weapon stations and provision for remote weapon systems.
