= El Menia Province =

Province of Algeria

El Menia Province ولاية المنيعة
- Province
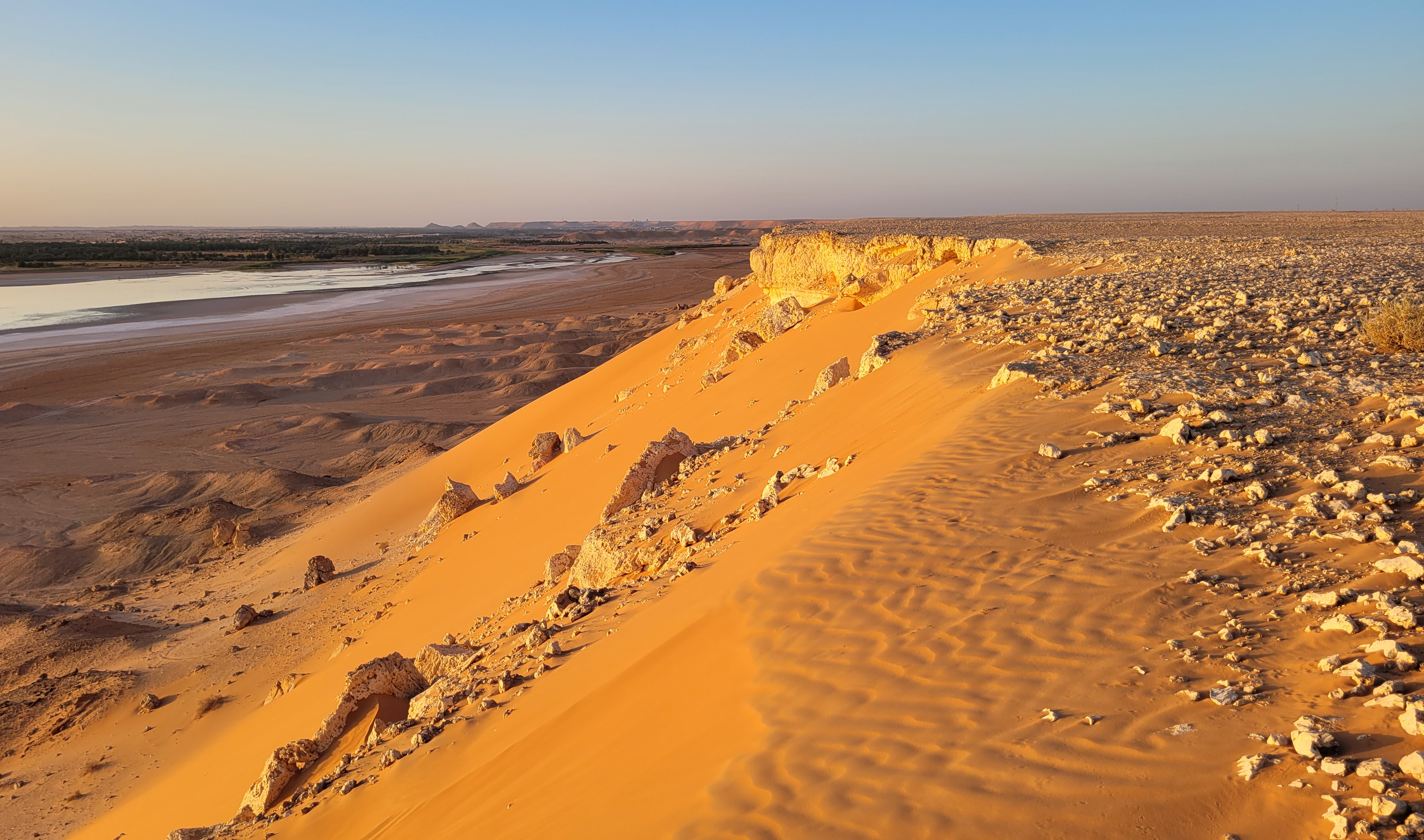
- Landscape of El Menia Province.

- Map of districts of El Menia
- Coordinates: 30°34′45″N 2°52′45″E
- Country: Algeria
- Capital: El Menia

Area
  - Total: 62,215 km^{2} (24,021 sq mi)
- Elevation: 276 m (906 ft)

Population (2008)
  - Total: 57,276
  - Density: 0.92061/km^{2} (2.3844/sq mi)
- Time zone: UTC+01 (CET)
- Area Code: +213 (0) 49
- ISO 3166 code: DZ-58
- Districts: 2
- Municipalities: 4

The Wilaya of El Menia (Arabic: ولاية المنيعة) is an Algerian Province created in 2019, previously, a delegated wilaya created in 2015. It is located in the Algerian Sahara.

== Geography ==
The wilaya of El Menia is in the Algerian Sahara, its area 131,220 km² .

It is delimited by:

- to the north by the Ghardaia Province;
- to the east by the Ouargla Province;
- to the west by the El Bayadh Province and Timimoun Province;
- and to the south by the In Salah Province.

== History ==
The wilaya of El Menia was created on November 26, 2019 .

Previously, it was a delegated wilaya, created according to the law n° 15–140 of May 27, 2015, creating administrative districts in certain wilayas and fixing the specific rules related to them, as well as the list of municipalities that are attached to it. Before 2019, it was part of the Ghardaia Province.

== Organization of the wilaya ==
During the administrative breakdown of 2019, the delegated wilaya of El Menia is made up of 3 communes and 1 District:

1. El Menia
2. Hassi Fehal
3. Hassi Gara
