= Vahhabiyeh =

Vahhabiyeh وهابيه
- Village
- Location within Iran
- Coordinates: 31°35′57″N 48°52′38″E
- Country: Iran
- Province: Khuzestan
- County: Ahvaz
- Bakhsh: Central
- Rural District: Anaqcheh

Population (2006)
  - Total: 259
- Time zone: UTC+3:30 (IRST)
  - Summer (DST): UTC+4:30 (IRDT)

Vahhabiyeh (Persian: وهابيه, also Romanized as Vahhābīyeh; also known as Vahābī) is a village in Anaqcheh Rural District, in the Central District of Ahvaz County, Khuzestan Province, Iran. At the 2006 census, its population was 259, in 51 families.
