= Abu Boqqal =

Abu Boqqal ابوبقال
- Village
- Location within Iran
- Coordinates: 31°29′51″N 48°47′07″E
- Country: Iran
- Province: Khuzestan
- County: Ahvaz
- Bakhsh: Central
- Rural District: Anaqcheh

Population (2006)
  - Total: 976
- Time zone: UTC+3:30 (IRST)
  - Summer (DST): UTC+4:30 (IRDT)

Abu Boqqal (Persian: ابوبقال, also Romanized as Abū Boqqāl and Abū Baqqāl; also known as Abu Baghāl, Abū Bogāl, Abū Qāl, Qal‘eh-ye Abū Baqqāl, Qal‘eh-ye Abū Qāl, and Saiyid Sālih) is a village in Anaqcheh Rural District, in the Central District of Ahvaz County, Khuzestan Province, Iran. At the 2006 census, its population was 976, in 176 families.
