= Cham Dogham =

Cham Dogham چم دغم
- Village
- Location within Iran
- Coordinates: 31°38′33″N 48°52′39″E
- Country: Iran
- Province: Khuzestan
- County: Ahvaz
- Bakhsh: Central
- Rural District: Anaqcheh

Population (2006)
  - Total: 73
- Time zone: UTC+3:30 (IRST)
  - Summer (DST): UTC+4:30 (IRDT)

Cham Dogham (Persian: چم دغم, also Romanized as Cham Dagham and Cham-e Dagham) is a village in Anaqcheh Rural District, in the Central District of Ahvaz County, Khuzestan Province, Iran. At the 2006 census, its population was 73, in 14 families.
