= Shahid-e Lefatah Kashtiban =

Shahid-e Lefatah Kashtiban شهيدلفته كشتيبان
- Village
- Country: Iran
- Province: Khuzestan
- County: Ahvaz
- Bakhsh: Central
- Rural District: Anaqcheh

Population (2006)
  - Total: 14
- Time zone: UTC+3:30 (IRST)
  - Summer (DST): UTC+4:30 (IRDT)

Shahid-e Lefatah Kashtiban (Persian: شهيدلفته كشتيبان, also Romanized as Shahīd-e Lefatah Kashtībān) is a village in Anaqcheh Rural District, in the Central District of Ahvaz County, Khuzestan Province, Iran. At the 2006 census, its population was 14, in 4 families.
