= Cham ol Obeyd =

Cham ol Obeyd چم العبيد
- Village
- Location within Iran
- Coordinates: 31°36′16″N 48°47′33″E
- Country: Iran
- Province: Khuzestan
- County: Ahvaz
- Bakhsh: Central
- Rural District: Anaqcheh

Population (2006)
  - Total: 585
- Time zone: UTC+3:30 (IRST)
  - Summer (DST): UTC+4:30 (IRDT)

Cham ol Obeyd (Persian: چم العبيد, also Romanized as Cham ol 'Obeyd and Chamm ol 'Obeyd; also known as Chammolābād and Ḩamlābād) is a village in Anaqcheh Rural District, in the Central District of Ahvaz County, Khuzestan Province, Iran. At the 2006 census, its population was 585, in 105 families.
