= Helleh va Delleh =

Helleh va Delleh حله ودله
- Village
- Location within Iran
- Coordinates: 31°32′01″N 48°52′19″E
- Country: Iran
- Province: Khuzestan
- County: Ahvaz
- Bakhsh: Central
- Rural District: Anaqcheh

Population (2006)
  - Total: 173
- Time zone: UTC+3:30 (IRST)
  - Summer (DST): UTC+4:30 (IRDT)

Helleh va Delleh (Persian: حله ودله, also Romanized as Ḩelleh va Delleh; also known as Ḩalleh Delleh, Ḩalvā Dillāy, Ḩelleh Delleh, and Hilloi-o-Dillai) is a village in Anaqcheh Rural District, in the Central District of Ahvaz County, Khuzestan Province, Iran. At the 2006 census, its population was 173, in 35 families.
