= Mansouri =

Mansouri (Mansoori)(Arabic: المنصوري, Persian: منصوری) is a surname common amongst the North Africa and Middle eastern regions. According to the United States census for the year 2000, the last name 'Mansouri' ranked 48,877 as the most common surname.

The name Mansouri had 405 occurrences in the 2000 United States census.

== List of persons with the surname ==
=== Iranians ===
- Arefeh Mansouri (born 1980), Iranian fashion and costume designer
- Mohammad Mansouri, Iranian footballer
- Mohammad Mansouri, Iranian footballer
- Lotfi Mansouri, Iranian opera director
- Reza Mansouri, Physicist
- Sareh Mansouri, LGBTQ activist

=== Moroccans ===
- Yassine Mansouri, chief of Morocco's intelligence agency.
- Fatima-Zahra Mansouri, Moroccan Politician
- Mimoun Mansouri, Moroccan general
- Mustapha Mansouri, Moroccan politician
- Zahra Mansouri, Moroccan poet

=== Algerians ===
- Faouzi Mansouri, Algerian football player
- Yazid Mansouri, Algerian football player
- Nawal Mansouri, Algerian Volleyball player
- Ismaïl Mansouri, Algerian football player

=== Others ===
- David Mansouri, Scottish field hockey defender
- Tahar Mansouri, Tunisian Marathon runner
- Skander Mansouri, Tunisian tennis player
- Yasmine Mansouri, French tennis player (younger sister of Skander Mansouri)
- Alia Al Mansoori, United Arab Emirates space scientist

=== Indians ===
- Mohammad Israil Mansuri, Indian politician
- Adil Mansuri, Gujarati writer
- Nazir Mansuri, Gujarati writer

== Other ==
- Mansouri Great Mosque
- Mansoori, Indian Persian community in India

== See also ==
- Mansuri (disambiguation)
- Mansura (disambiguation)
