= Tasfiyeh Shekar =

Tasfiyeh Shekar تصفيه شكر
- Village
- Location within Iran
- Coordinates: 31°25′09″N 48°43′40″E
- Country: Iran
- Province: Khuzestan
- County: Ahvaz
- Bakhsh: Central
- Rural District: Anaqcheh

Population (2006)
  - Total: 413
- Time zone: UTC+3:30 (IRST)
  - Summer (DST): UTC+4:30 (IRDT)

Tasfiyeh Shekar (Persian: تصفيه شكر, also Romanized as Tasfīyeh Shekar and Tasfīyeh-Ye-Shekar) is a village in Anaqcheh Rural District, in the Central District of Ahvaz County, Khuzestan Province, Iran. At the 2006 census, its population was 413, in 83 families.
