= El Ménia District =

El Ménia District دائرة المنيعة
- District
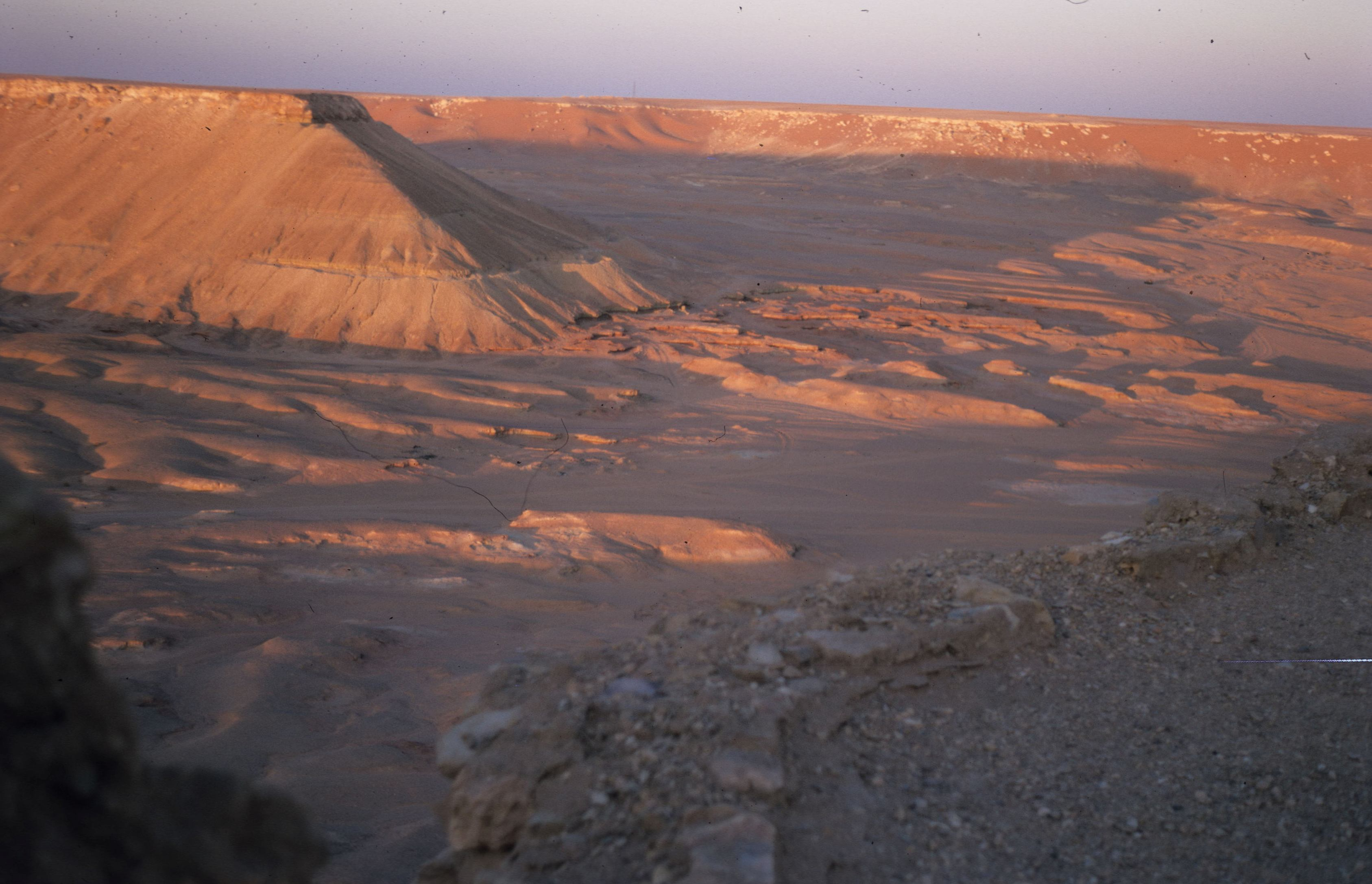

- Map of Algeria highlighting Ghardaïa Province

- Map of Ghardaïa Province highlighting El Ménia District
- Coordinates: 30°35′N 2°53′E
- Country: Algeria
- Province: El Menia
- District seat: El Ménia

Area
  - Total: 49,000 km^{2} (19,000 sq mi)

Population (2005)
  - Total: 51,383
  - Density: 1.0/km^{2} (2.7/sq mi)
- Time zone: UTC+01 (CET)
- Municipalities: 2

El Ménia is a district in El Menia Province, Algeria. It was named after its capital, El Ménia.

== Municipalities ==
The district is further divided into 2 municipalities:

- El Ménia
- Hassi Gara
