= 13th Special Operations Command =

13th Special Operations Command "Sacred Squadron"
- 13η Διοίκηση Ειδικών Επιχειρήσεων «ΙΕΡΟΣ ΛΟΧΟΣ»
- Emblem of the 13th Special Operations Command, featuring the badge of the World War II-era Sacred Band
- Active: 1913–1916, 1920–1935, 1940–1941, 1988–2021
- Country: Greece
- Branch: Hellenic Army
- Type: Special forces
- Role: Special operations
- Size: Brigade
- Part of: 1st Infantry Division
- Garrison/HQ: Athens
- Engagements: Asia Minor Campaign; Greco-Italian War

The 13th Special Operations Command "Sacred Band" (Greek: 13η Διοίκηση Ειδικών Επιχειρήσεων «ΙΕΡΟΣ ΛΟΧΟΣ», 13 ΔΕΕ) was an umbrella unit of the Hellenic Army's special operation forces.

== History ==
The 13th SOC traces its descent to the 13th Infantry Regiment (13ο Σύνταγμα Πεζικού), formed in November–December 1913 as part of the enlargement and re-organization of the Hellenic Army after the Balkan Wars. Along with the 27th and 28th Infantry Regiments, it formed the 11th Infantry Division under III Army Corps, headquartered in Thessaloniki. Along with the bulk of the Army, the regiment was disbanded during the National Schism in 1916.

On 10 February 1920, the Regiment was ordered re-established, and by May it had been re-formed and joined the Xanthi Division in Western Thrace. In the second half of June 1920, the Regiment was placed at the disposal of the British command at Çanakkale, helping to secure the British occupation zone around the Dardanelles Strait. Between 1–10 July, it was shipped back to the area of Soufli. On 10 July, it crossed the Evros River as part of the Greek offensive against the Turkish army in Eastern Thrace, and advanced up to Kirk Kilisse. In April 1921, the regiment was transferred again to Asia Minor, participating in the operations of the remainder of the Asia Minor Campaign until 1922.

In the re-organization of the Army following the defeat in Asia Minor, the 13th Regiment was once again placed under 11th Infantry Division, now based at Kilkis. In 1935, it was renamed to 65th Infantry Regiment. A 13th Infantry Regiment was re-formed in Thessaloniki upon the outbreak of the Greco-Italian War on 28 October 1940. Its formation was completed by mid-November, and, once again placed under 11th Infantry Division, it participated in the Greek offensive in Albania in the Ersekë–Dobruzhe axis (21 November 1940 – 5 February 1941). It was then placed in a defensive position at Mali Spadarit (6 February – 2 April), where it was among the units that successfully faced the Italian Spring Offensive. After that, it was withdrawn to the rear, and, with the German invasion of Greece unfolding from 6 April, was gradually moved south back into Greece, reaching Metsovo on 17 April. Following the capitulation of the Army to the Germans on 23 April, the regiment was disarmed on 24 April and began to demobilize. The remnants were moved to Larissa on 4 May, and the unit was formally disbanded on 10 May.

During the Axis occupation of Greece, the Panhellenic Liberation Organization, a Resistance group active in Macedonia, formed a "13th Guerrilla Regiment" (13ο Αντάρτικο Σύνταγμα) near Kilkis, based on the unit's traditional association with the area.

The 13th Regiment was not re-formed after World War II. On 22 May 1988, the 13th Amphibious Raider Regiment (13ο Σύνταγμα Αμφιβίων Καταδρομών, 13 ΣΑΚ) was formed, assuming the overall command of the various hitherto independent amphibious raider units, i.e. the I Amphibious Raider Squadron (Α’ Μοίρα Αμφιβίων Καταδρομών, Α’ ΜΑΚ) at Rhodes, the III Amphibious Raider Squadron (Γ’ Μοίρα Αμφιβίων Καταδρομών, Γ’ ΜΑΚ) at Chios, and the various Special National Guard Detachments (ΕΤΕΘ) on other Aegean islands. Following the Imia crisis of 1996, the newly formed elite VII Amphibious Raider Squadron (Ζ’ Μοίρα Αμφιβίων Καταδρομών, Ζ’ ΜΑΚ) was added to the Regiment, and in 1998 the Army's oldest fully professional and most elite formation, the Special Paratroopers Detachment (Ειδικό Τμήμα Αλεξιπτωτιστών, ΕΤΑ), came under its command.

In 2001, the 13th Amphibious Raider Regiment was re-organized, being expanded into the brigade-level 13th Special Operations Command and receiving the honorary title "Sacred Band" after the World War II-era Greek special forces unit. In 2002, the 13th Signals Company and the 13th Engineering Company were added as specialized support units. The unit forms part of the 1st Infantry Division, which groups together the Army's special and rapid reaction forces. From September 2005 until the Corps' disbandment in 2013, the unit was additionally placed under the supervision of the II Army Corps.

In 2021, as part of a major reorganization of the Greek special forces into a single Special Warfare Command, the 13th Special Operations Command was replaced by the Joint Special Operations Command.

== Structure ==
- Joint Special Operations Command', in Athens, (Attica)
  - Hellenic Army — Zeta Amphibious Commando Squadron (Ζ' ΜΑΚ), in Nea Peramos (Attica) (Tier 1 Special Forces)
  - Hellenic Air Force — 31st Combat Search and Rescue Squadron (31 ΜΕΕΔ), in Elefsina (Attica) (Tier 1 Special Forces)
  - Hellenic Navy — Underwater Demolition Command (ΔΥΚ), in Skaramagas (Attica) (Tier 1 Special Forces)
  - Special Paratroopers Unit (ETA), in Nea Peramos, (Attica)
  - Naval Special Operations Unit (ΤΝΕΕ), in Nea Peramos, (Attica)
  - Air Special Operations Unit (ΜΑΕΕ), at Pachi Airfield in Megara, (Attica)
  - Alpha Amphibious Commando Squadron (Α' ΜΑΚ), on Rhodes island
  - Gamma Amphibious Commando Squadron (Γ' ΜΑΚ), on Chios island
  - Eta Amphibious Commando Squadron (Η' ΜΑΚ), on Lesbos island
  - Theta Amphibious Commando Squadron (Θ' ΜΑΚ), on Samos island
  - Iota Amphibious Commando Squadron (Ι' ΜΑΚ), on Kos island
  - Signals Company (ΛΔΒ), in Nea Peramos, (Attica)
  - Special Operations Support Unit, in Nea Peramos, (Attica)

=== Zeta Amphibious Commando Squadron ===
Members of the Zeta Amphibious Commando Squadron are professional NCOs and officers. They are the command's contribution to the Defence Ministry's Inter-Service Operational Rapid Response Command (Διακλαδικό Επιχειρησιακό Στρατηγείο Άμεσης Αντίδρασης, ΔΕΣΑΑ), along with the Hellenic Navy's Underwater Demolition Command, and the Hellenic Air Force's 31st Combat Search and Rescue Squadron. The formation is also known as "Force Delta" (Δύναμη Δέλτα). 41 fast landing boats MUNIN S-1200 were ordered in December 2021 for Hellenic Army amphibious raider squadrons of Greece's recently created Joint Special Operations Command. The first 4 boats were delivered on 3 July 2023.

== See also ==
- Underwater Demolition Command
- Sacred Band (World War II)
