= MYK =

MYK may refer to:

- Underwater Demolition Command, the Greek elite underwater demolition squad
- MYK (musician), aka Michael Kim, associated with Epik High
