= Mansuriyeh-ye Do =

Mansuriyeh-ye Do منصوريه دو
- Village
- Location within Iran
- Coordinates: 31°30′19″N 48°52′11″E
- Country: Iran
- Province: Khuzestan
- County: Ahvaz
- Bakhsh: Central
- Rural District: Anaqcheh

Population (2006)
  - Total: 305
- Time zone: UTC+3:30 (IRST)
  - Summer (DST): UTC+4:30 (IRDT)

Mansuriyeh-ye Do (Persian: منصوريه دو, also Romanized as Manşūrīyeh-ye Do) is a village in Anaqcheh Rural District, in the Central District of Ahvaz County, Khuzestan Province, Iran. At the 2006 census, its population was 305, in 32 families.
