= Hassi Gara =

Hassi Gara حاسي قارة
- Commune and town
- Location of Hassi Gara commune within Ghardaïa Province

- Location of Hassi Gara within Algeria
- Coordinates: 30°33′8″N 2°54′54″E
- Country: Algeria
- Province: Ghardaïa Province
- District: El Ménia District
- Elevation: 380 m (1,250 ft)

Population (2008)
  - Total: 17,801
- Time zone: UTC+1 (CET)

Hassi Gara (Arabic: حاسي قارة) is a town and commune in El Ménia District, Ghardaïa Province, Algeria. According to the 2008 census it has a population of 17,801, up from 13,911 in 1998, with an annual growth rate of 2.5%. It is effectively a suburb of the larger town El Goléa.

== Geography ==
Hassi Gara is located almost at the center of Algeria, lying at the eastern border of the Grand Erg Occidental at an elevation of 380 metres (1,250 ft). The town is centered in the El Goléa oasis; to the east dramatic cliffs rise up to 200 metres (660 ft) above the town.

== Climate ==
Hassi Gara has a hot desert climate (Köppen climate classification BWh), with very hot summers and cool winters. There is very little rain throughout the year, and summers are especially dry.

== Transportation ==
Hassi Gara is very close to El Goléa and there are many local roads that connect the two towns. The N1 runs through Hassi Gara, connecting Ghardaïa to the north to In Salah and Tamanrasset to the south.

== Education ==
6.1% of the population has a tertiary education, and another 15.9% has completed secondary education. The overall literacy rate is 81.1%, and is 85.3% among males and 76.9% among females.

== Localities ==
The commune of Hassi Gara is composed of six localities:

- Quartiers El Borr
- Hassi El Gara Ouest
- Hassi El Gara Est
- El Ouadjda
- Edjraïf
- Nebka
