= Al-Mansura, Ramle =

Al-Mansura
- Village
- Etymology: Building
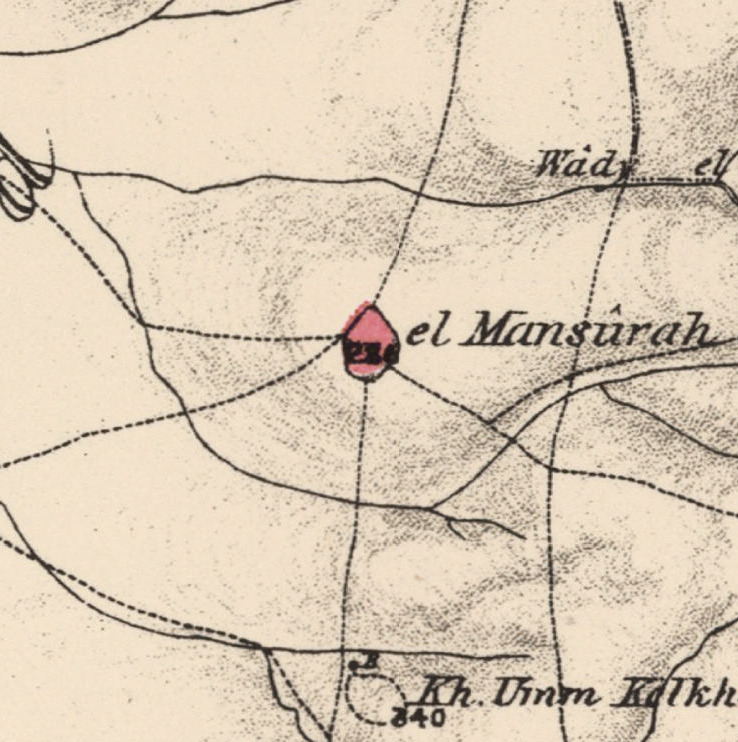
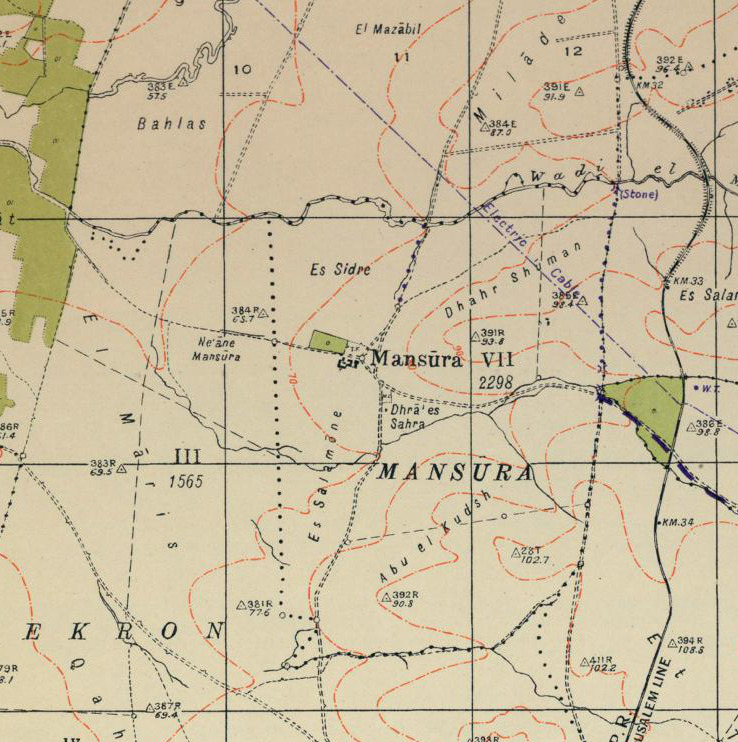
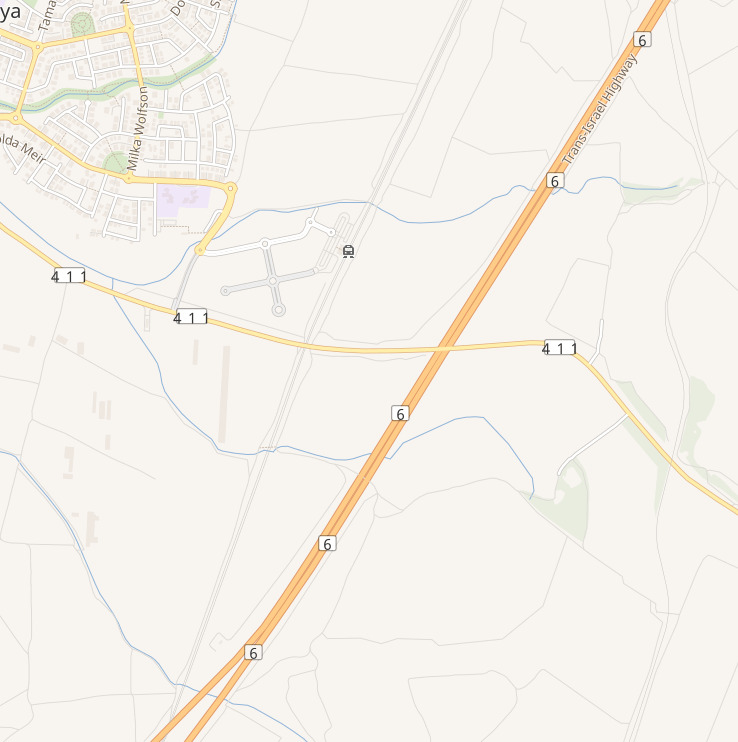
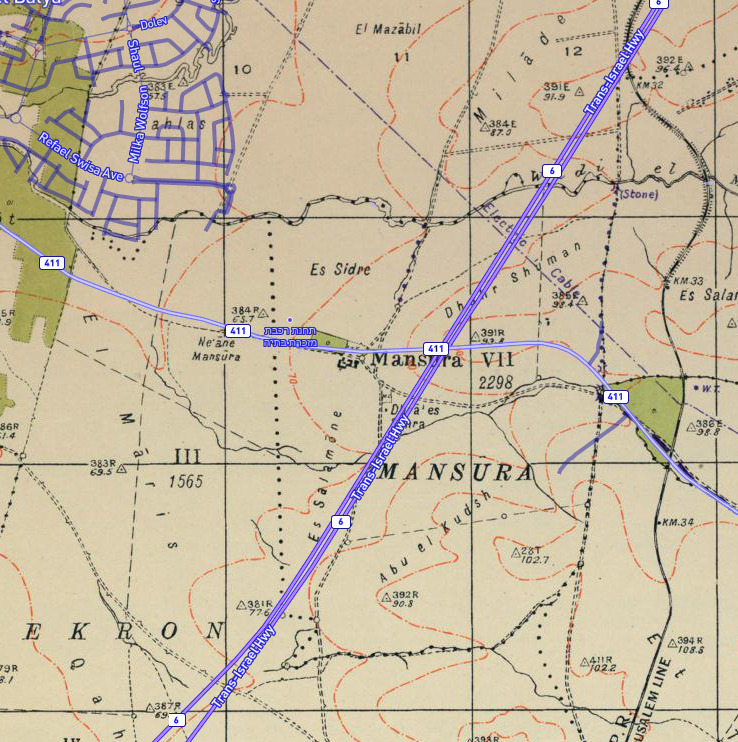
- 1870s map 1940s map modern map 1940s with modern overlay map A series of historical maps of the area around Al-Mansura, Ramle (click the buttons)

- Location within Mandatory Palestine
- Coordinates: 31°50′16″N 34°51′26″E
- Palestine grid: 136/138
- Geopolitical entity: Mandatory Palestine
- Subdistrict: Ramle
- Date of depopulation: April 20, 1948

Area
  - Total: 2,328 dunams (2.328 km^{2}; 0.899 sq mi)

Population (1945)
  - Total: 90
- Cause(s) of depopulation: Military assault by Yishuv forces

See El Mansurah (disambiguation) for other sites with similar names.

Al-Mansura was a small Palestinian Arab village in the Ramle Subdistrict, located 10 km south of Ramla. It was depopulated during the 1947–48 Civil War in Mandatory Palestine on April 20, 1948, under Operation Barak.

== History ==
In 1838, it was noted as a small Muslim village in the Er-Ramleh District.

In 1863, Victor Guérin passed by, and noted a spring by the village.

In 1882, the PEF's Survey of Western Palestine noted it as an adobe village of "moderate size."

=== British Mandate era ===
In the 1922 census of Palestine, conducted by the British Mandate authorities, Mansura had a population of 31, all Muslims, increasing in the 1931 census to 61, still all Muslims, in a total of 14 houses.

In the 1945 statistics, the village had a population of 90, all Muslim, and the total land area was 2,328 dunums. Of this, Arabs used 2,113 dunums for cereals, while 3 dunams were classified as built-up urban areas.

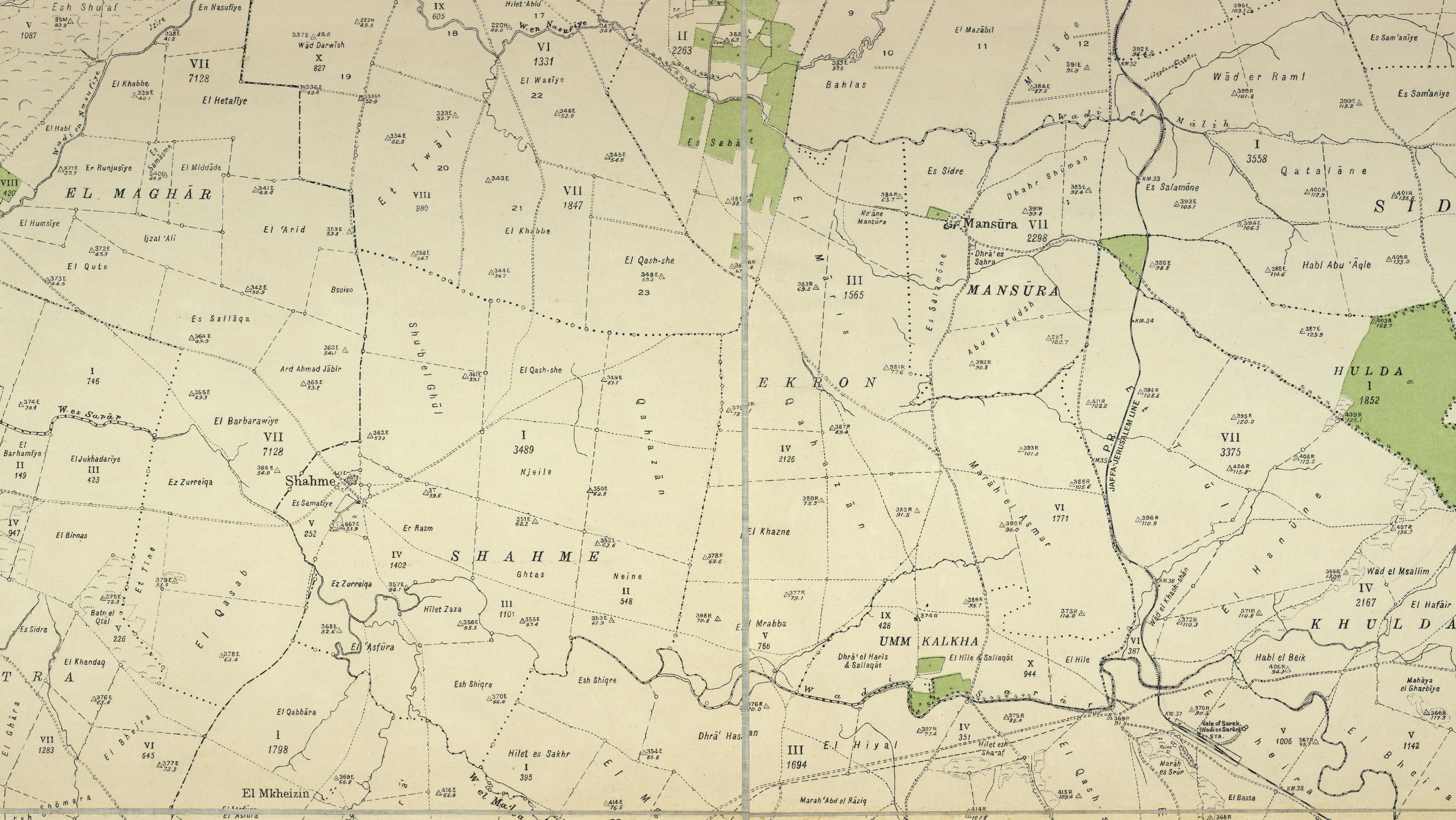
al-Mansura 1930 1:20,000

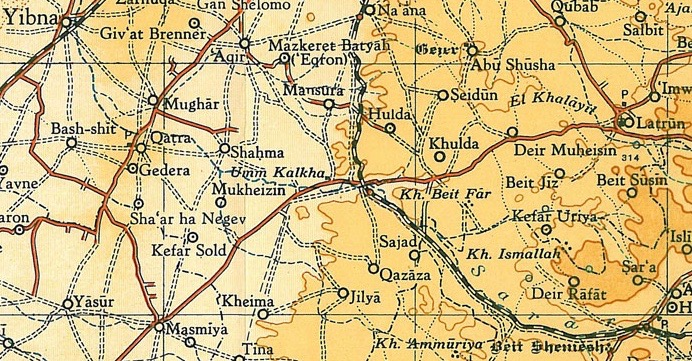
al-Mansura 1945 1:250,000

=== 1948, aftermath ===
Al-Mansura was depopulated on April 20, 1948, after a military assault.

In 1992 it was described: "The site is planted with sycamore trees and there are also cactuses growing on it. The surrounding land is cultivated by the settlers of Mazkeret Batya, this settlement was founded [] on land belonging to Aqir."

== Bibliography ==
- Barron, J.B., ed. (1923). Palestine: Report and General Abstracts of the Census of 1922. Government of Palestine.
- Conder, C.R.; Kitchener, H.H. (1882). The Survey of Western Palestine: Memoirs of the Topography, Orography, Hydrography, and Archaeology. Vol. 2. London: Committee of the Palestine Exploration Fund.
- Department of Statistics (1945). Village Statistics, April, 1945. Government of Palestine.
- Guérin, V. (1869). Description Géographique Historique et Archéologique de la Palestine (in French). Vol. 1: Judee, pt. 2. Paris: L'Imprimerie Nationale.
- Hadawi, S. (1970). Village Statistics of 1945: A Classification of Land and Area ownership in Palestine. Palestine Liberation Organization Research Center. Archived from the original on 2018-12-08.
- Khalidi, W. (1992). All That Remains: The Palestinian Villages Occupied and Depopulated by Israel in 1948. Washington D.C.: Institute for Palestine Studies. ISBN 0-88728-224-5.
- Mills, E., ed. (1932). Census of Palestine 1931. Population of Villages, Towns and Administrative Areas. Jerusalem: Government of Palestine.
- Morris, B. (2004). The Birth of the Palestinian Refugee Problem Revisited. Cambridge University Press. ISBN 978-0-521-00967-6.
- Palmer, E.H. (1881). The Survey of Western Palestine: Arabic and English Name Lists Collected During the Survey by Lieutenants Conder and Kitchener, R. E. Transliterated and Explained by E.H. Palmer. Committee of the Palestine Exploration Fund.
- Robinson, E.; Smith, E. (1841). Biblical Researches in Palestine, Mount Sinai and Arabia Petraea: A Journal of Travels in the year 1838. Vol. 3. Boston: Crocker & Brewster.
