= Yekaviyeh-ye Seh =

Yekaviyeh-ye Seh يكاويه سه
- Village
- Location within Iran
- Coordinates: 31°35′29″N 48°48′59″E
- Country: Iran
- Province: Khuzestan
- County: Ahvaz
- Bakhsh: Central
- Rural District: Anaqcheh

Population (2006)
  - Total: 175
- Time zone: UTC+3:30 (IRST)
  - Summer (DST): UTC+4:30 (IRDT)

Yekaviyeh-ye Seh (Persian: يكاويه سه, also Romanized as Yekāvīyeh-ye Seh; also known as Lekāvīgeh-e Seh and Lekāvīgeh-ye Seh) is a village in Anaqcheh Rural District, in the Central District of Ahvaz County, Khuzestan Province, Iran. At the 2006 census, its population was 175, in 33 families.
