= Yekaviyeh-ye Do =

Yekaviyeh-ye Do يكاويه دو
- Village
- Location within Iran
- Coordinates: 31°36′05″N 48°49′38″E
- Country: Iran
- Province: Khuzestan
- County: Ahvaz
- Bakhsh: Central
- Rural District: Anaqcheh

Population (2006)
  - Total: 74
- Time zone: UTC+3:30 (IRST)
  - Summer (DST): UTC+4:30 (IRDT)

Yekaviyeh-ye Do (Persian: يكاويه دو, also Romanized as Yekāvīyeh-ye Do; also known as Lekāvīgeh-e Do and Lekāvīgeh-ye Do) is a village in Anaqcheh Rural District, in the Central District of Ahvaz County, Khuzestan Province, Iran. In 2006, its population was 74, in 16 families.
