= Hassi Fehal =

Hassi Fehal حاسي لفحل
- Commune and town
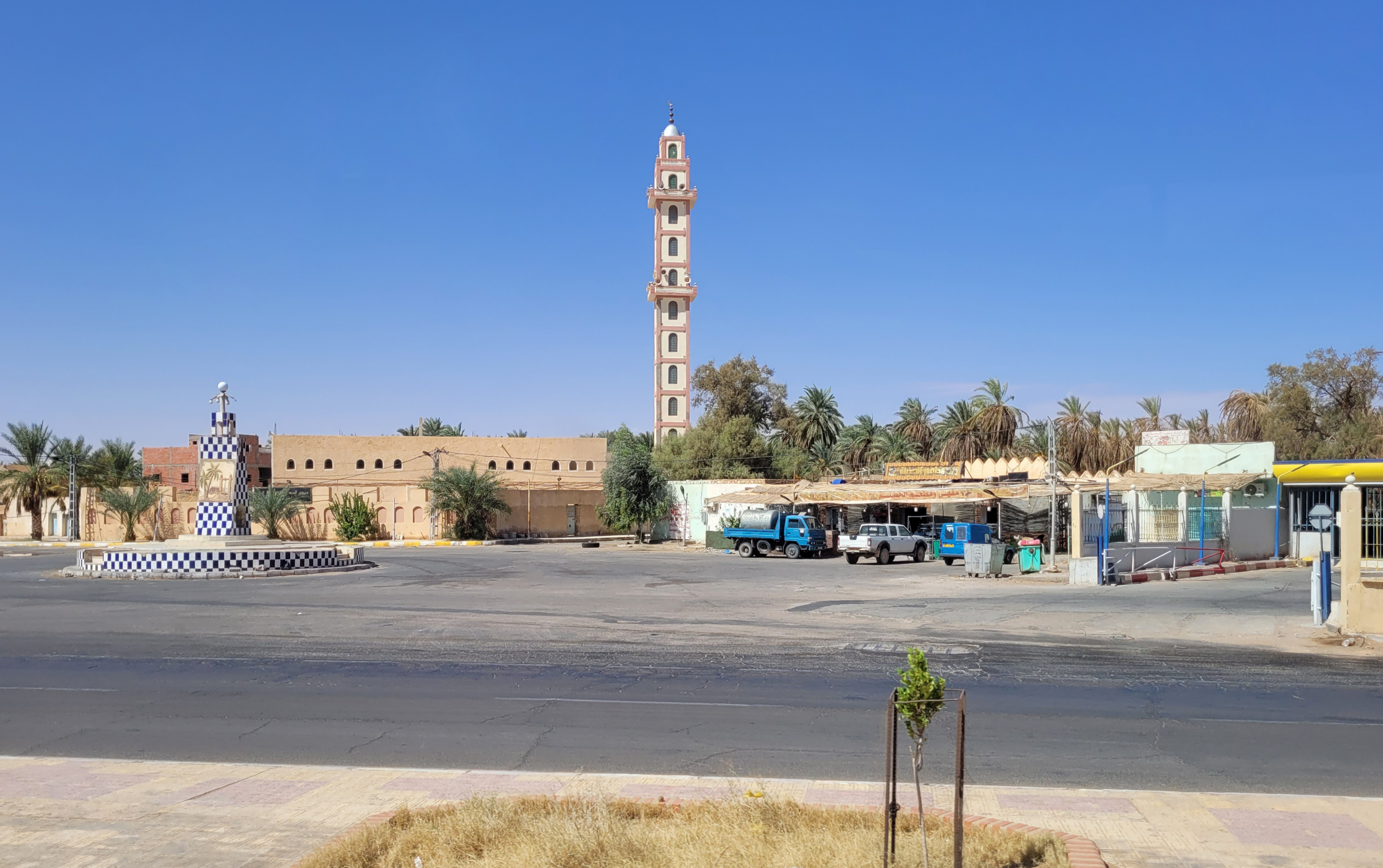
- Zoubir ibn Alawam Mosque

- Location of Hassi Fehal commune within Ghardaïa Province

- Location of Hassi Fehal within Algeria
- Coordinates: 31°36′19″N 3°40′27″E
- Country: Algeria
- Province: Ghardaïa Province
- District: Mansoura District
- Elevation: 379 m (1,243 ft)

Population (2008)
  - Total: 3,651
- Time zone: UTC+1 (CET)

Hassi Fehal (Arabic: حاسي لفحل) (also written Hassi Lefhal) is a town and commune in Mansoura District, Ghardaïa Province, Algeria. According to the 2008 census it has a population of 3,651, up from 2,164 in 1998, and a growth rate of 5.5%, the highest in the province.

== Transportation ==
Hassi Fehal lies on the Trans-Sahara Highway just south of Mansoura, between Ghardaïa to the north and El Goléa to the south.

== Education ==
4.0% of the population has a tertiary education, and another 15.3% has completed secondary education. The overall literacy rate is 68.0%, and is 72.4% among males and 63.2% among females, all three figures being the lowest for any commune in the province.

== Localities ==
The commune of Hassi Fehal is composed of one locality:

- Centre de Hassi Lefhal
