= Maraveneh-ye Seh =

Maraveneh-ye Seh مراونه سه
- Village
- Location within Iran
- Coordinates: 31°37′24″N 48°37′04″E
- Country: Iran
- Province: Khuzestan
- County: Ahvaz
- Bakhsh: Central
- Rural District: Anaqcheh

Population (2006)
  - Total: 121
- Time zone: UTC+3:30 (IRST)
  - Summer (DST): UTC+4:30 (IRDT)

Maraveneh-ye Seh (Persian: مراونه سه, also Romanized as Marāvaneh-ye Seh; also known as Al Marā‘ūneh, Almarāveneh-ye Yek, Almarāvīyeh, Almarāyeneh, Marā‘ūneh, and Marāveneh) is a village in Anaqcheh Rural District, in the Central District of Ahvaz County, Khuzestan Province, Iran. At the 2006 census, its population was 121, in 28 families.
