= Mansuriyeh-ye Sadat =

Mansuriyeh-e Sadat منصوريه سادات
- Village
- Location within Iran
- Coordinates: 31°29′24″N 48°52′08″E
- Country: Iran
- Province: Khuzestan
- County: Ahvaz
- Bakhsh: Central
- Rural District: Anaqcheh

Population (2006)
  - Total: 37
- Time zone: UTC+3:30 (IRST)
  - Summer (DST): UTC+4:30 (IRDT)

Mansuriyeh-e Sadat (Persian: منصوريه سادات, also Romanized as Manşūrīyeh-ye Sādāt; also known as Mansūra, Manşūreh, Manşūrīyeh, and Manşūrīyeh-ye Yek) is a village in Anaqcheh Rural District, in the Central District of Ahvaz County, Khuzestan Province, Iran. At the 2006 census, its population was 37, in 9 families.
