= Maraveneh-ye Yek =

Maraveneh-ye Yek مراونه يك
- Village
- Location within Iran
- Coordinates: 31°31′45″N 48°46′49″E
- Country: Iran
- Province: Khuzestan
- County: Ahvaz
- Bakhsh: Central
- Rural District: Anaqcheh

Population (2006)
  - Total: 114
- Time zone: UTC+3:30 (IRST)
  - Summer (DST): UTC+4:30 (IRDT)

Maraveneh-ye Yek (Persian: مراونه يك, also Romanized as Marāveneh-ye Yek; also known as Dobb ol ‘Az̄īr, Dobbol Ghadīr, and Doobé Ghadir) is a village in Anaqcheh Rural District, in the Central District of Ahvaz County, Khuzestan Province, Iran. At the 2006 census, its population was 114, in 23 families.
