= Seffak =

Village in Khuzestan province, Iran

Seffak Persian: صفاك
- Village
- Location within Iran
- Coordinates: 31°36′25″N 48°44′17″E
- Country: Iran
- Province: Khuzestan
- County: Bavi
- District: Central
- Rural District: Anaqcheh

Population (2016)
  - Total: 869
- Time zone: UTC+3:30 (IRST)

Seffak (Persian: صفاك) (Note: Also romanized as Şefāk, Şaffāk, and Şeffāk; also known as Beyt-e Şafūk and Şafāl) is a village in Anaqcheh Rural District of the Central District of Bavi County, Khuzestan province, Iran.

== Demographics ==
=== Population ===
At the time of the 2006 National Census, the village's population was 712 in 123 households, when it was in Anaqcheh Rural District (Note: Renamed Lami Rural District) of the Central District of Ahvaz County. The following census in 2011 counted 696 people in 157 households, by which time the village had been separated from the county in the establishment of Bavi County and was transferred to Anaqcheh Rural District created in the new Central District. The 2016 census measured the population of the village as 869 people in 223 households. It was the most populous village in its rural district.
