= Jassaniyeh-ye Kuchek =

Jassaniyeh-ye Kuchek جسانیه کوچک
- Village
- Location within Iran
- Coordinates: 31°23′57″N 48°45′04″E
- Country: Iran
- Province: Khuzestan
- County: Ahvaz
- Bakhsh: Central
- Rural District: Anaqcheh

Population (2006)
  - Total: 887
- Time zone: UTC+3:30 (IRST)
  - Summer (DST): UTC+4:30 (IRDT)

Jassaniyeh-ye Kuchek (Persian: جسانیه کوچک, also Romanized as Jassānīyeh-ye Kūchek) is a village in Anaqcheh Rural District, in the Central District of Ahvaz County, Khuzestan Province, Iran. At the 2006 census, its population was 887, in 141 families.
