= Cham Khazam-e Do =

Cham Khazam-e Do چم خزام دو
- Village
- Location within Iran
- Coordinates: 31°38′01″N 48°50′32″E
- Country: Iran
- Province: Khuzestan
- County: Ahvaz
- Bakhsh: Central
- Rural District: Anaqcheh

Population (2006)
  - Total: 273
- Time zone: UTC+3:30 (IRST)
  - Summer (DST): UTC+4:30 (IRDT)

Cham Khazam-e Do (Persian: چم خزام دو, also Romanized as Cham Khazām-e Do; also known as Chamkharām-e Do and Chamkhazām) is a village in Anaqcheh Rural District, in the Central District of Ahvaz County, Khuzestan Province, Iran. At the 2006 census, its population was 273, in 50 families.
