= Al Mawakeb Schools =

- مدرسة المواكبب
- Dubai; United Arab Emirates

Information
- Type: Private school
- Established: 1979
- Color: Navy Blue
- Website: almawakeb.sch.ae

Al Mawakeb Schools (Arabic: مدارس المواكب) is an international school system in Dubai, United Arab Emirates. Serving grades Kindergarten through 12, it is managed by Academia Management Solutions International (AMSI). Its high school program uses a U.S. curriculum.

As of 2017 the school system has a total of 10,000 students. The school system itself began in 1979.

== Campuses ==
It has three campuses: Al Mawakeb School - Al Garhoud, which opened in 1979; Al Mawakeb School - Al Barsha, which opened in 1997 and serves 2,500 students; and Al Mawakeb School - Al Khawaneej which opened in 2018.

== Notable alumni ==
- Dina Shihabi, Saudi actress
- Alia Al Mansoori, UAE space scientist
