= Mansoura, Ghardaïa =

Mansoura منصورة
- Commune and town
- Location of Mansoura commune within Ghardaïa Province

- Location of Mansoura within Algeria
- Coordinates: 31°58′46″N 3°44′46″E
- Country: Algeria
- Province: Ghardaïa Province
- District: Mansoura District
- Elevation: 428 m (1,404 ft)

Population (2008)
  - Total: 2,840
- Time zone: UTC+1 (CET)

Mansoura (Arabic: منصورة) is a town and commune, and the capital of Mansoura District, in Ghardaïa Province, Algeria. According to the 2008 census it has a population of 2,840, up from 1,765 in 1998, with an annual growth rate of 5.0%, the second highest in the province (behind Hassi Fehal).

== Climate ==
Mansoura has a hot desert climate (Köppen climate classification BWh), with very hot summers and mild winters, and very little precipitation throughout the year.

Climate data for Mansoura
Month	Jan	Feb	Mar	Apr	May	Jun	Jul	Aug	Sep	Oct	Nov	Dec	Year
Mean daily maximum °C (°F)	16.8 (62.2)	19.5 (67.1)	23.2 (73.8)	28.7 (83.7)	33.3 (91.9)	39.2 (102.6)	42.9 (109.2)	41.9 (107.4)	36.1 (97.0)	28.8 (83.8)	21.4 (70.5)	17.3 (63.1)	29.1 (84.4)
Daily mean °C (°F)	10.4 (50.7)	12.7 (54.9)	16.1 (61.0)	20.8 (69.4)	25.4 (77.7)	31.0 (87.8)	34.2 (93.6)	33.4 (92.1)	28.8 (83.8)	21.8 (71.2)	15.1 (59.2)	11.1 (52.0)	21.7 (71.1)
Mean daily minimum °C (°F)	4.1 (39.4)	6.0 (42.8)	9.1 (48.4)	13.0 (55.4)	17.6 (63.7)	22.8 (73.0)	25.5 (77.9)	25.0 (77.0)	21.6 (70.9)	14.9 (58.8)	8.9 (48.0)	4.9 (40.8)	14.5 (58.0)
Average precipitation mm (inches)	6 (0.2)	3 (0.1)	9 (0.4)	4 (0.2)	3 (0.1)	1 (0.0)	1 (0.0)	1 (0.0)	4 (0.2)	5 (0.2)	7 (0.3)	6 (0.2)	50 (1.9)
Source: climate-data.org

== Transportation ==
Mansoura lies on the Trans-Sahara Highway (also known as the N1 national highway) just north of the town of Hassi Fehal. The highway connects to Ghardaïa to the north, and El Goléa and In Salah to the south.

== Education ==
3.9% of the population has a tertiary education (the equal lowest in the province), and another 12.9% has completed secondary education. The overall literacy rate is 72.5%, and is 77.6% among males and 66.6% among females; all three figures are the second lowest in the province behind Hassi Fehal.

== Localities ==
The commune of Mansoura is composed of two localities:

- El Mansoura
- Aïn Loussig et Chouikat Sud
