= Mansurat al-Khayt =

Mansurat al-Khayt منصورة الخيط Mansurat al Kheit
- Village
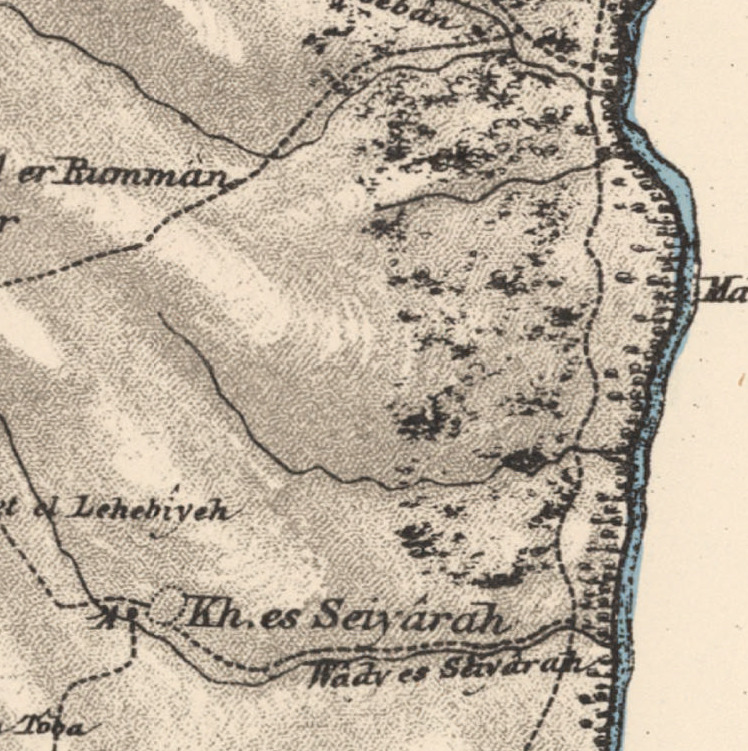
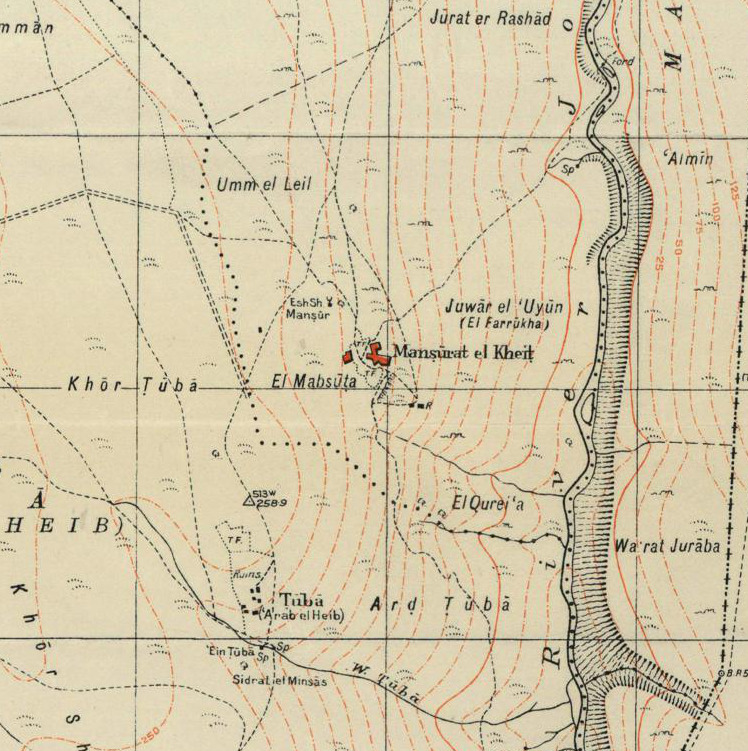
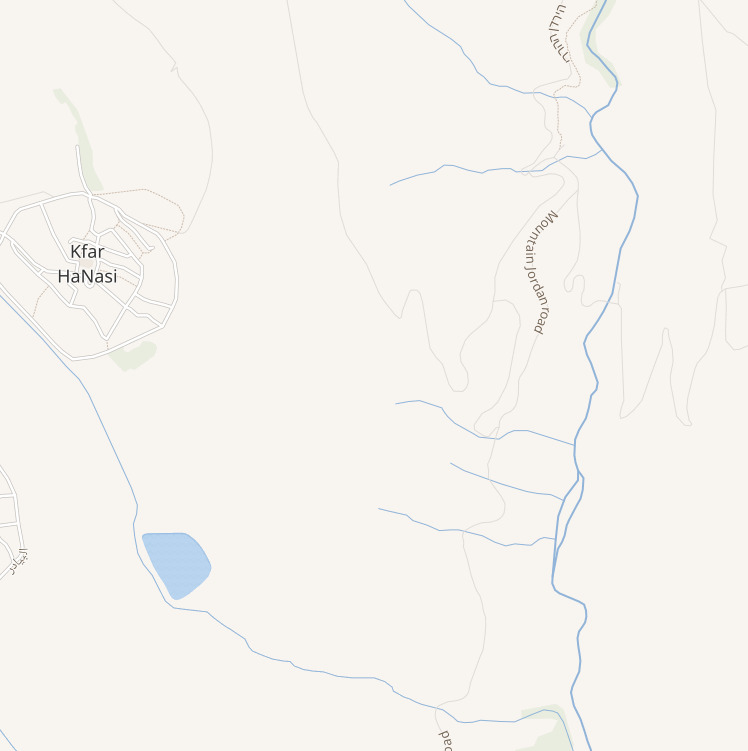
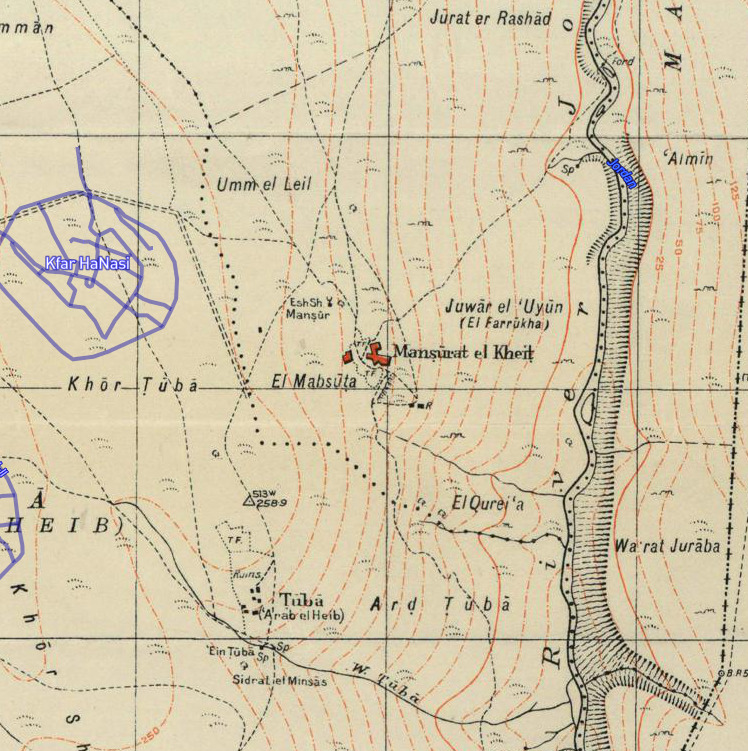
- 1870s map 1940s map modern map 1940s with modern overlay map A series of historical maps of the area around Mansurat al-Khayt (click the buttons)

- Location within Mandatory Palestine
- Coordinates: 32°58′15″N 35°36′58″E
- Palestine grid: 207/264
- Geopolitical entity: Mandatory Palestine
- Subdistrict: Safad
- Date of depopulation: January 18, 1948

Area
  - Total: 6,735 dunams (6.735 km^{2}; 2.600 sq mi)

Population (1945)
  - Total: 200
- Cause(s) of depopulation: Military assault by Yishuv forces
- Current Localities: Kfar Hanassi? However, Khalidi writes that it is on the land of Tuba

See Mansura (disambiguation) for other sites with similar names.

Mansurat al-Khayt was a Palestinian Arab village in the Safad Subdistrict. It was depopulated during the 1947–48 Civil War in Mandatory Palestine on January 18, 1948. It was located 11.5 km east of Safed, 1 km west of the Jordan River.

== History ==
Part of the name, al-Khayt, came from the area named as ard al-khayt, located southwest of the lake of Hula.

Al-Dimashqi (d.1327) wrote about Al Khait: "A district of the Upper Ghaur of the Jordan Valley. The country resembles that of Irak in the matter of its rice, its birds, its hot springs, and excellent crops."

In the mid 18th century, The Syrian Sufi teacher and traveller al-Bakri al-Siddiqi (1688-1748/9) noted that he passed by al-Khayt with a judge from Safad.

=== British Mandate era ===
In the 1922 census of Palestine, conducted by the British Mandate authorities, Kerad al Khait had a population of 437 Muslims, decreasing in the 1931 census when Mansurat el Hula had to 367 Muslims inhabitants, in a total of 61 houses.

In the 1945 statistics the village had a population of 200 Muslims, with 6,735 dunams of land, all of which was publicly owned. Of this, 5,052 dunams were used for cereals, while 17 dunams were classified as built-up, public areas.

The village was also known by Mansurat al-Hula to distinguish it from al-Mansura in Safed and had a shrine for a local sage known as al-Shaykh Mansur from which the village was named after.

=== 1948, aftermath ===
The village was temporarily evacuated after a Haganah attack on 18 January 1948. The Haganah was under order to "eliminate" anyone in the village who resisted. It was noted that "houses and shacks were set alight" during the attack.

In July 1948, a new settlement called Habonim, later renamed Kfar Hanassi, went up on the land of Mansurat al-Khayt.

== Bibliography ==
- Al-Dimashqi (1866). Cosmographie (in Arabic). Translated by A. F. Mehren. Saint-Pétersbourg: l'Académie Impriale des Sciences.
- Barron, J. B., ed. (1923). Palestine: Report and General Abstracts of the Census of 1922. Government of Palestine.
- Department of Statistics (1945). Village Statistics, April, 1945. Government of Palestine.
- Hadawi, S. (1970). Village Statistics of 1945: A Classification of Land and Area ownership in Palestine. Palestine Liberation Organization Research Center.
- Khalidi, W. (1992). All That Remains: The Palestinian Villages Occupied and Depopulated by Israel in 1948. Washington D.C.: Institute for Palestine Studies. ISBN 0-88728-224-5.
- Mills, E., ed. (1932). Census of Palestine 1931. Population of Villages, Towns and Administrative Areas. Jerusalem: Government of Palestine.
- Morris, B. (2004). The Birth of the Palestinian Refugee Problem Revisited. Cambridge University Press. ISBN 978-0-521-00967-6.
- Robinson, E.; Smith, E. (1841). Biblical Researches in Palestine, Mount Sinai and Arabia Petraea: A Journal of Travels in the year 1838. Vol. 3. Boston: Crocker & Brewster.
- Strange, le, G. (1890). Palestine Under the Moslems: A Description of Syria and the Holy Land from A.D. 650 to 1500. Committee of the Palestine Exploration Fund.
