= Maraveneh-ye Do =

Maraveneh-ye Do مراونه دو
- Village
- Location within Iran
- Coordinates: 31°32′07″N 48°47′02″E
- Country: Iran
- Province: Khuzestan
- County: Ahvaz
- Bakhsh: Central
- Rural District: Anaqcheh

Population (2006)
  - Total: 67
- Time zone: UTC+3:30 (IRST)
  - Summer (DST): UTC+4:30 (IRDT)

Maraveneh-ye Do (Persian: مراونه دو, also Romanized as Marāveneh-ye Do) is a village in Anaqcheh Rural District, in the Central District of Ahvaz County, Khuzestan Province, Iran. At the 2006 census, its population was 67, in 14 families.
