= Maraveneh-ye Chahar =

Maraveneh-ye Chahar مراونه چهار
- Village
- Location within Iran
- Coordinates: 31°36′00″N 48°37′00″E
- Country: Iran
- Province: Khuzestan
- County: Ahvaz
- Bakhsh: Central
- Rural District: Anaqcheh

Population (2006)
  - Total: 86
- Time zone: UTC+3:30 (IRST)
  - Summer (DST): UTC+4:30 (IRDT)

Maraveneh-ye Chahar (Persian: مراونه چهار, also Romanized as Marāvaneh-ye Chahār; also known as Al Marā‘ūneh and Marā‘ūneh) is a village in Anaqcheh Rural District, in the Central District of Ahvaz County, Khuzestan Province, Iran. At the 2006 census, its population was 86, in 18 families.
