= Cham Khazam-e Yek =

Cham Khazam-e Yek چم خزام يك
- Village
- Location within Iran
- Coordinates: 31°38′34″N 48°51′32″E
- Country: Iran
- Province: Khuzestan
- County: Ahvaz
- Bakhsh: Central
- Rural District: Anaqcheh

Population (2006)
  - Total: 115
- Time zone: UTC+3:30 (IRST)
  - Summer (DST): UTC+4:30 (IRDT)

Cham Khazam-e Yek (Persian: چم خزام يك, also Romanized as Cham Khazām-e Yek; also known as Cham Kazām, Cham Kazām-e Yek, and Chamkharām-e Yek) is a village in Anaqcheh Rural District, in the Central District of Ahvaz County, Khuzestan Province, Iran. At the 2006 census, its population was 115, in 23 families.
