= Yekaviyeh-ye Yek =

Yekaviyeh-ye Yek يكاويه يك
- Village
- Location within Iran
- Coordinates: 31°37′14″N 48°50′08″E
- Country: Iran
- Province: Khuzestan
- County: Ahvaz
- Bakhsh: Central
- Rural District: Anaqcheh

Population (2006)
  - Total: 774
- Time zone: UTC+3:30 (IRST)
  - Summer (DST): UTC+4:30 (IRDT)

Yekaviyeh-ye Yek (Persian: يكاويه يك, also Romanized as Yekāvīyeh-ye Yek; also known as Lekāvīgeh-ye Yek) is a village in Anaqcheh Rural District, in the Central District of Ahvaz County, Khuzestan Province, Iran. At the 2006 census, its population was 774, in 86 families.
