= Amashiyeh-ye Do =

Amashiyeh-ye Do عماشيه دو
- Village
- Location within Iran
- Coordinates: 31°31′22″N 48°49′22″E
- Country: Iran
- Province: Khuzestan
- County: Ahvaz
- Bakhsh: Central
- Rural District: Anaqcheh

Population (2006)
  - Total: 84
- Time zone: UTC+3:30 (IRST)
  - Summer (DST): UTC+4:30 (IRDT)

Amashiyeh-ye Do (Persian: عماشيه دو, also Romanized as ‘Amāshīyeh-ye Do, ‘Amāsheyeh-ye Do, and ‘Ammāshīyeh-ye Do; also known as ‘Amāshīyeh) is a village in Anaqcheh Rural District, in the Central District of Ahvaz County, Khuzestan Province, Iran. At the 2006 census, its population was 84, in 17 families.
