= Jassaniyeh-ye Bozorg =

Jassaniyeh-ye Bozorg جسانيه بزرگ
- Village
- Location within Iran
- Coordinates: 31°25′07″N 48°44′51″E
- Country: Iran
- Province: Khuzestan
- County: Ahvaz
- Bakhsh: Central
- Rural District: Anaqcheh

Population (2006)
  - Total: 2,654
- Time zone: UTC+3:30 (IRST)
  - Summer (DST): UTC+4:30 (IRDT)

Jassaniyeh-ye Bozorg (Persian: جسانيه بزرگ, also Romanized as Jassānīyeh-ye Bozorg; also known as Jassānīyeh, Loveymī, Lovīmī, and Luwaimi) is a village in Anaqcheh Rural District, in the Central District of Ahvaz County, Khuzestan Province, Iran. At the 2006 census, its population was 2,654, in 481 families.
