= Amashiyeh-ye Yek =

Village in Khuzestan province, Iran

Amashiyeh-ye Yek Persian: عماشيه يك
- Village
- Location within Iran
- Coordinates: 31°31′22″N 48°49′32″E
- Country: Iran
- Province: Khuzestan
- County: Bavi
- District: Central
- Rural District: Anaqcheh

Population (2016)
  - Total: 802
- Time zone: UTC+3:30 (IRST)

Amashiyeh-ye Yek (Persian: عماشيه يك) (Note: Also romanized as ‘Amāshīyeh-ye Yek) is a village in, and the capital of, Anaqcheh Rural District of the Central District of Bavi County, Khuzestan province, Iran.

== Demographics ==
=== Population ===
At the time of the 2006 National Census, the village's population was 328 in 67 households, when it was in Anaqcheh Rural District (Note: Renamed Lami Rural District) of the Central District of Ahvaz County. The following census in 2011 counted 697 people in 162 households, by which time the village had been separated from the county in the establishment of Bavi County and was transferred to Anaqcheh Rural District created in the new Central District. The 2016 census measured the population of the village as 802 people in 210 households.
