= Alia Al Mansoori =

Emirati space scientist

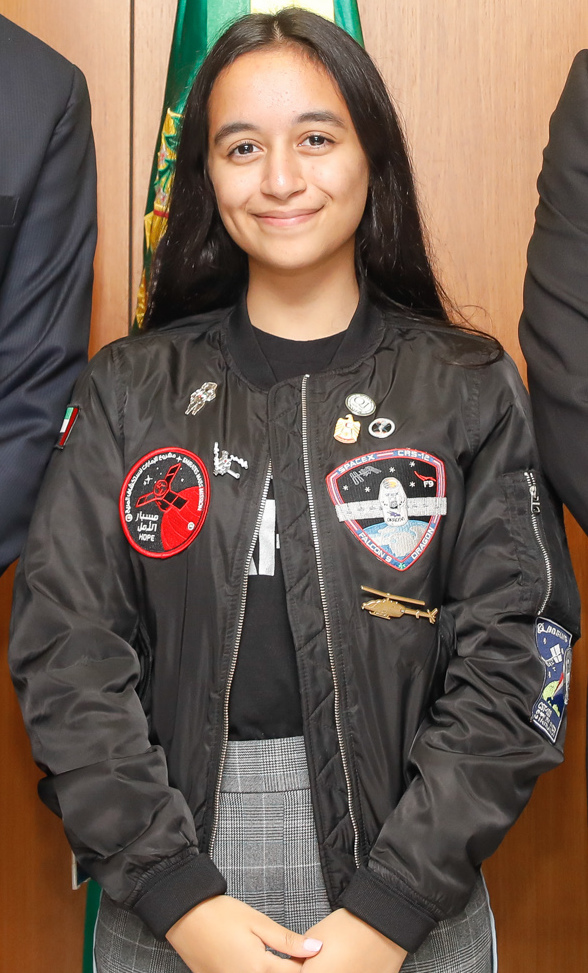
- Alia Al Mansoori in 2019
- Born: c. 2002
- Education: Al Mawakeb Schools
- Known for: Winning the Genes In Space UAE competition in 2017

Alia Al Mansoori (Arabic: علياء المنصوري) is a former Emirati pupil at Al Mawakeb School. In 2017, aged 15, she won the Genes in Space UAE competition, with a proposal to study how exposure to space affects the health of live organisms at cellular level. Her experiment was loaded onto the August 2017 SpaceX CRS-12 mission. Al Mansoori's experiment studied the expression of heat-shock proteins in space, establishing that the genes turning them on could be detected. Her experiment was successfully tested by astronaut Peggy Whitson and revealed stress-induced gene expression using reverse transcription polymerase chain reaction.

In 2018, Al Mansoori represented the United Arab Emirates at the 114th Explorers Club Annual Dinner in New York. The following year, while in her 11th grade at Al Mawakeb School, she was appointed to a two-year part-time internship as Scientific Research Fellow at New York University Abu Dhabi. Al Mansoori also founded a platform called Emirati Astronaut, to encourage aspiring and veteran astronauts to connect.

In 2021, while studying biological sciences at the University of Edinburgh, Al Mansoori was selected to join the "Futureneers", a group of young emiratis tasked with developing ideas to prepare the country for the next 50 years. Her dream "is to be the first Emirati woman to visit Mars".

== Personal life ==
Al Mansoori enjoys sports, and said that Brazilian jiu-jitsu "helped [her] feel strong and confident". She credits her parents and her brother, who is ten years her elder and is now a forensic scientist, with fostering her passion for science.
