= Mansuri, Taft =

Mansuri منصوري
- Village
- Location within Iran
- Coordinates: 31°17′48″N 54°05′46″E
- Country: Iran
- Province: Yazd
- County: Taft
- Bakhsh: Nir
- Rural District: Garizat

Population (2006)
  - Total: 70
- Time zone: UTC+3:30 (IRST)
  - Summer (DST): UTC+4:30 (IRDT)

Mansuri (Persian: منصوري, romanized: Manşūrī) is a village in Garizat Rural District, Nir District, Taft County, Yazd Province, Iran. At the 2006 census, its population was 70, in 24 families.
