= Underwater Demolition Command =

Special warfare unit of the Greek Navy

- Διοίκηση Υποβρυχίων Καταστροφών (ΔΥΚ)
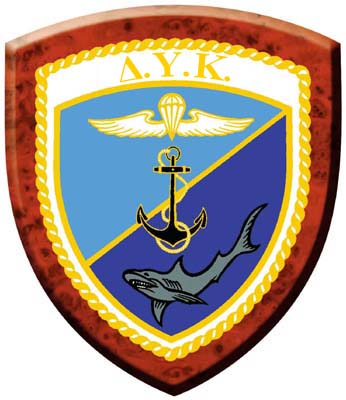
- Underwater Demolition Command (DYK) emblem
- Active: 1957–Present
- Country: Greece; Cyprus
- Branch: Hellenic Navy
- Type: Special Forces
- Role: Special Reconnaissance (SR); Direct Action (DA); Military assistance (MA); Combat Search And Rescue (CSAR); Collateral Activities (CA)
- Part of: Inter-Service Operational Rapid Response Command
- Nicknames: Frogmen (Greek: Βατραχάνθρωποι); Frogs (Greek: Βατράχια); OYK (Greek: ΟΥΚ); Oykades (Greek: Οϋκάδες)
- Engagements: Gulf War; Imia crisis 1997 Albanian civil unrest Operation Atalanta; Libyan civil war Operation Irini
- Website: Underwater Demolition Command

Commanders
- First: Captain Panagiotis Nikolareas

Insignia
- Abbreviation: Δ.Υ.Κ.

The Underwater Demolition Command (Greek: Διοίκηση Υποβρυχίων Καταστροφών), abbreviated as DYK (Greek: ΔΥΚ,Greek pronunciation: [ðik]) and known until 2001 as the Underwater Demolition Unit (Greek: Μονάδα Υποβρυχίων Καταστροφών), abbreviated as MYK (Greek: ΜΥΚ, Greek pronunciation: [mik]), is the Greek Navy's special warfare unit.

== History ==
Carrying on the tradition of the Hellenic Navy in naval special operations, the unit was established in 1957 with help from the United States Navy's Underwater Demolition Team, when two Greek officers were sent to Little Creek in Virginia to evaluate a UDT operational capability for the Hellenic Navy.

The first operation of OYK happened in Cyprus in march of 1964 where a unit inserted by the port of Mansoura, undertook a short reconnaissance of the bay for weapons smuggling from Turkish militias and then proceeded to destroy the contents.

In 1997, during the violent unrest that erupted in neighboring Albania, the OYK were responsible for taking control of the international airport of Tirana and the evacuation of 240 foreign dignitaries from Albania (Operation Kosmas).

In 2008, OYK teams took part in Operation Atalanta, deploying onboard Hellenic Navy vessels off the coast of Somalia. The OYK would carry out counter-piracy operations for the rest of the Hellenic Navy's deployment to the region.

In late July/ early August 2014, Greek Navy SEALs undertook an operation in which they were to evacuate Greek/ Cypriot and foreign citizens from Tripoli, Libya. The team entered the tripoli port to carry out reconnaissance and to establish contact with local Libyan forces on the ground. The civilians were then evacuated, 89 being from either Greece or Cyprus and an additional 97 people being citizens other countries (Including the United Kingdom, China, Russia, Albania and Belgium). In total, 186 people were extracted. The civilians were transported by Libyan port authority RHIBs (due to weather) and then handed off to a Greek frigate which later sailed back to Piraeus.

In 2020, the Hellenic Navy began taking part in Operation Irini, a European naval task force tasked with monitoring and intercepting suspicious cargo close to the Libyan shores, as part of the arms embargo on Libya. OYK teams are tasked with executing VBSS operations. So far, a large number of onboard visits have been carried out by the teams.

On 30 April 2020, a boat had entered Greek Waters (Cyprus) unmanned and without making any contact with the Cypriot authorities. Immediately the Cyprus Joint Rescue Coordination Center called for the Underwater Demolitions Command to respond, and immediately, boats carrying the SEALs were sent to the area. Upon arrival, they had found 2 people who later told them that due to technical difficulties on the boat, it began acting erratically and had in fact at first thrown them off. Because of this, the 2 people were transported to Larnaka hospital and the boat was transported to land by the Underwater Demolitions Command.

== OYK training ==
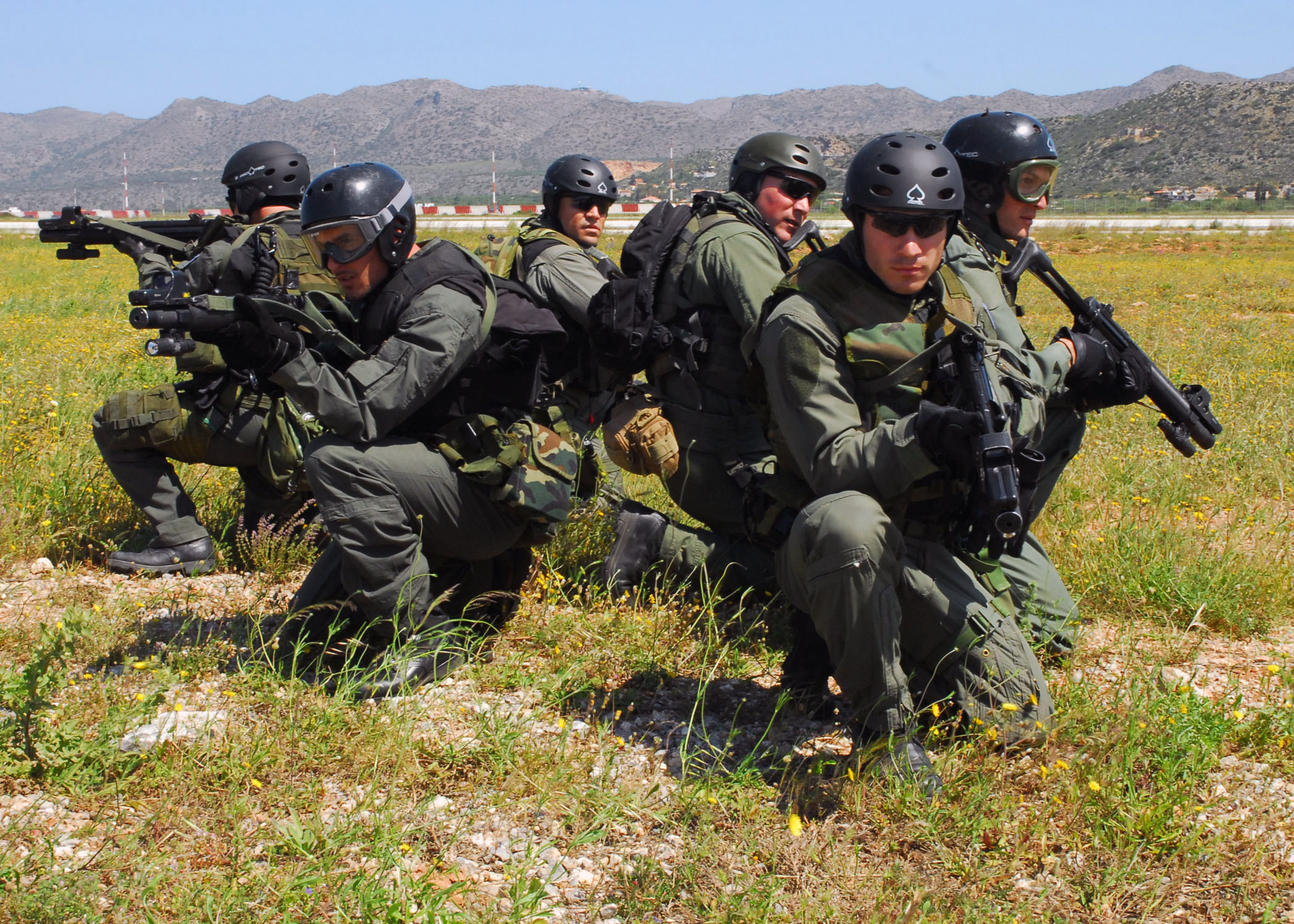
UDT during fast-roping exercise Phoenix Express.(2009)

The selection and training course lasts roughly seven months and is divided into three phases similar to that of the US Navy SEALs BUD/S course. The course has an extremely high failure rate similar to that of its US counterparts. The candidates will go on to airborne school and then continue to learn advanced naval special warfare techniques.

== OYK equipment ==
The OYK is known to use various types of firearms to complete their missions with some guns being customized to be able to adapt to the marine environment of the OYK.

- Glock 17 9×19mm (does have sub-aqua spring cups to help with the marine environment to allow the gun to shoot right when it pulled out in the water and has an extended threaded barrel that can attach a suppressor if needed)
- Glock 18 9×19mm (has been utilized in the past, though the standard issue is the Glock 17)
- Heckler & Koch MP5-SD 9×19mm (MP5 variant used is the MP5A3)
- M4 Carbine 5.56×45mm (is usually equipped with a Holographic sight and a fore-grip)
- M4A1 5.56×45mm (is equipped with Acog holographic and sometimes with a magnifier ×1, as well as fore-grips)
- FN Minimi 7.62×51mm
- Springfield Armory M21 Sniper Weapon System 7.62×51mm
- Benelli M3T 12 Gauge
- Barrett M82A1 .50 BMG
- Accuracy International AWM
- M203 Grenade Launcher

== 2015 Independence Day Parade Controversy ==
The OYK generated controversy at the Greek Independence Day parade of 2015, when it chanted a nationalistic refrain: «Και το όνειρο μας είναι / στην Πόλη εμείς να μπούμε / σημαία να υψώσουμε / τον ύμνο εμείς να πούμε», roughly translated as 'Our dream is to enter Polis (Constantinople) to raise our flag and sing our anthem'. Opposition ministers from the PASOK party launched attacks on the defence Minister Panos Kammenos, accusing him of mishandling matters of vital foreign policy. Concerns were also expressed by the government (SYRIZA) MP Vassiliki Katrouvanou, who called the chants 'a clear offense to our republic', and highlighted the ongoing need to remove certain far-right elements from the Greek armed forces.

== See also ==
- 13th Special Operations Command
- 1st Raider/Paratrooper Brigade
