= Mansourah District (Ghardaïa Province) =

Mansourah District دائرة منصورة
- District
- Map of Algeria highlighting Ghardaïa Province

- Map of Ghardaïa Province highlighting Mansourah District
- Coordinates: 31°58′46″N 3°44′46″E
- Country: Algeria
- Province: Ghardaïa
- District seat: Mansourah

Area
  - Total: 13,215 km^{2} (5,102 sq mi)

Population (2005)
  - Total: 5,893
  - Density: 0.4459/km^{2} (1.155/sq mi)
- Time zone: UTC+01 (CET)
- Municipalities: 2

Mansourah is a district in Ghardaïa Province, Algeria. It was named after its capital, Mansoura.

== Municipalities ==
The district is further divided into 2 municipalities:

- Mansoura
- Hassi Fehal
