= Al-Mansorah, Saudi Arabia =

Al-Mansorah (also spelled Al-Mansoora or Al-Mansoorah) (Arabic: المنصورة), is a town in eastern region of Saudi Arabia and one of the eastern towns and villages in Al-Ahsa. It is considered one of the fast-growing towns of the Eastern-Region towns and villages. Al-Mansorah is closely associated with Al-Shaharyn village (قرية الشهارين), and many people in one community are relatives of those in the other.

== History ==
Al-Mansorah or Al-Mansoorah (المنصورة) is from Arabic: إنتصار, meaning 'victory'. The story goes that, long ago, many people of Al-Omran village (قرية العمران were in conflict for a century or longer with the administrators of the place. A group of families finally left Al-Omran for what was then a remote, uninhabited area, and there they founded Al-Mansorah, so-named because they felt that had won a victory against misrule in Al-Omran.

== Education ==
There are some schools in this village. The main ones are listed below: A. The elementary/primary schools:

1. The Primary School of Al-Mansourah (boys). (مدرسة المنصورة الإبتدائية)
2. The First Primary School of Al-Mansourah for Girls. (المدرسة الأولى الإبتدائية للبنات بالمنصورة)
3. The Second Primary School of Al-Mansourah for Girls. (المدرسة الثانية الإبتدائيةللبنات بالمنصورة)

B. The intermediate/middle schools:

1. The Middle School of Al-Manourah (boys). (مدرسة المنصورة المتوسطة)
2. The First Middle of Al-Manourah for Girls. (المدرسة الأولى المتوسطه للبنات بالمنصورة)

C. The secondary/high schools:

1. High School of Mozdalifa (boys). (مدرسة مزدلفة الثانوية بالمنصورة)
2. High School of Al-Yamama (boys). (مدرسة اليمامة الثانوية بالمنصورة)
3. The First High School for Girls. (المدرسة الأولى الثانوية للبنات بالمنصورة)

== See also ==
Al-Ahsa
