= Mansoura, Morocco =

Mansoura المنصورة
- Rural commune and town
- Interactive map of Mansoura
- Coordinates: 34.8356°N 4.9655°W
- Country: Morocco
- Region: Tanger-Tetouan-Al Hoceima
- Province: Chefchaouen

Population (2004)
  - Total: 16,559
- Time zone: UTC+0 (GMT)

Mansoura is a small town and rural commune in Chefchaouen Province, Tanger-Tetouan-Al Hoceima, Morocco. At the time of the 2004 census, the commune had a total population of 16,559 people living in 2664 households.
