= Mansura, Libya =

Mansura
- Town
- Location in Libya
- Coordinates: 32°50′N 21°51′E
- Country: Libya
- Region: Cyrenaica
- District: Jebel el-Akhdar
- Time zone: UTC + 2

Mansura is a small town in the District of Jebel el-Akhdar in north-eastern Libya and it is located 15 km northeast of Beida. The town is famous for its chest diseases hospital which is considered to be the best in the country because of its location.
