= Mansoura, Cyprus =

Mansoura: Μανσούρα (Greek); Mansur (Turkish)
- Village
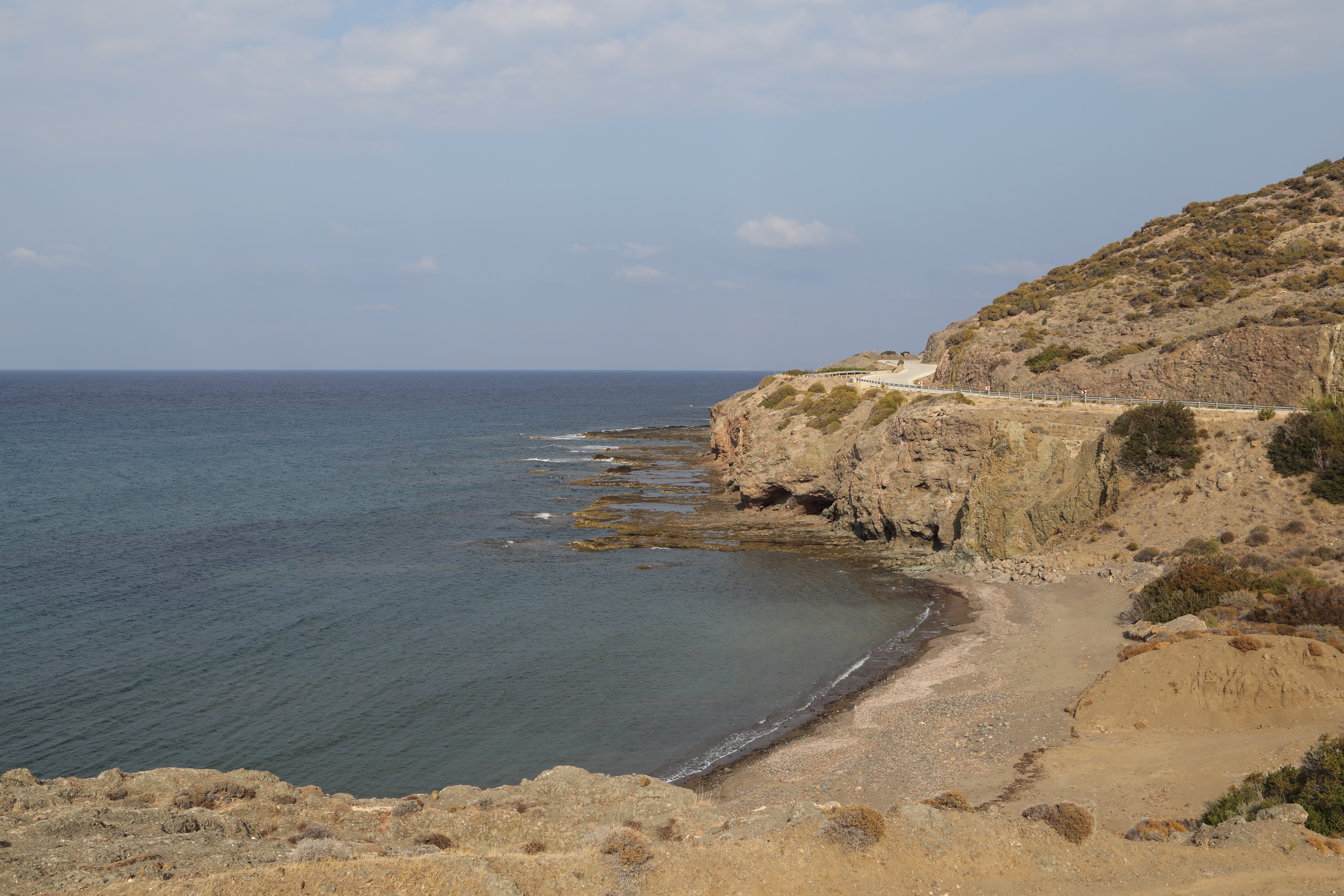

- Location in Cyprus
- Coordinates: 35°11′16″N 32°37′57″E
- Country: Cyprus
- District: Nicosia District
- Time zone: UTC+2 (EET)
  - Summer (DST): UTC+3 (EEST)

Mansoura (Greek: Μανσούρα; Turkish: Mansur) is an abandoned village in the UN Buffer Zone near Kokkina, Cyprus. Up until 1911, the village was exclusively inhabited by Turkish Cypriots. Although the population fluctuated in the early decades of the twentieth century, it grew steadily from 41 in 1891 to 147 in 1960, when Turkish Cypriots made up about 86% of the residents. The first displacement linked to conflict occurred in December 1963, when all Greek Cypriot inhabitants of Mansoura fled the village. In August 1964, however, it was the Turkish Cypriots of Mansoura who were forced to leave their homes. That month, the village was evacuated by UNFICYP after coming under attack from General Grivas and the Greek Cypriot National Guard. Most displaced Turkish Cypriots from the village took refuge in the enclaves of Kokkina/Erenköy, Limnitis/Yeşilırmak, and Lefka/Lefke, where they remained until 1976. They were then resettled in the Turkish-controlled part of the island, mainly in Yialousa/Yenierenköy on the Karpasia/Karpaz peninsula.
