= Mansuriyeh, Fars =

Mansuriyeh منصوريه
- Village
- Location within Iran
- Coordinates: 28°47′10″N 54°21′51″E
- Country: Iran
- Province: Fars
- County: Darab
- Bakhsh: Central
- Rural District: Paskhan

Population (2006)
  - Total: 554
- Time zone: UTC+3:30 (IRST)
  - Summer (DST): UTC+4:30 (IRDT)

Mansuriyeh (Persian: منصوريه, also Romanized as Manşūrīyeh; also known as Manşūrī) is a village in Paskhan Rural District, in the Central District of Darab County, Fars province, Iran. At the 2006 census, its population was 554, in 122 families.
