= Mansureh-ye Mazi =

Mansureh-ye Mazi منصوره ماضي
- Village
- Location within Iran
- Coordinates: 30°46′20″N 48°50′14″E
- Country: Iran
- Province: Khuzestan
- County: Shadegan
- Bakhsh: Central
- Rural District: Hoseyni

Population (2006)
  - Total: 58
- Time zone: UTC+3:30 (IRST)
  - Summer (DST): UTC+4:30 (IRDT)

Mansureh-ye Mazi (Persian: منصوره ماضي, also Romanized as Manṣūreh-ye Māz̤ī) is a village in Hoseyni Rural District, in the Central District of Shadegan County, Khuzestan Province, Iran. At the 2006 census, its population was 58, in 13 families.
