= Mansureh-ye Sadat =

Mansureh-ye Sadat منصوره سادات
- Village
- Location within Iran
- Coordinates: 30°46′47″N 48°53′25″E
- Country: Iran
- Province: Khuzestan
- County: Shadegan
- Bakhsh: Central
- Rural District: Hoseyni

Population (2006)
  - Total: 551
- Time zone: UTC+3:30 (IRST)
  - Summer (DST): UTC+4:30 (IRDT)

Mansureh-ye Sadat (Persian: منصوره سادات, also Romanized as Manşūreh-ye Sādāt; also known as Manşūreh, Manşūreh-ye Pā’īn, Manşūreh-ye Soflá, and Manūreh-ye Shay) is a village in Hoseyni Rural District, in the Central District of Shadegan County, Khuzestan Province, Iran. At the 2006 census, its population was 551, in 89 families.
