= Mansureh-ye Kanin =

Mansureh-ye Kanin منصوره كنين
- Village
- Location within Iran
- Coordinates: 30°46′35″N 48°52′50″E
- Country: Iran
- Province: Khuzestan
- County: Shadegan
- Bakhsh: Central
- Rural District: Hoseyni

Population (2006)
  - Total: 55
- Time zone: UTC+3:30 (IRST)
  - Summer (DST): UTC+4:30 (IRDT)

Mansureh-ye Kanin (Persian: منصوره كنين, also Romanized as Manşūreh-ye Kanīn; also known as Manşūreh-ye Fāẕel) is a village in Hoseyni Rural District, in the Central District of Shadegan County, Khuzestan Province, Iran. At the 2006 census, its population was 55, in 7 families.
