= Mansureh-ye Olya =

Village in Khuzestan province, Iran

Mansureh-ye Olya Persian: منصوره عليا
- Village
- Location within Iran
- Coordinates: 30°48′54″N 48°53′29″E
- Country: Iran
- Province: Khuzestan
- County: Shadegan
- District: Central
- Rural District: Hoseyni

Population (2016)
  - Total: 3,242
- Time zone: UTC+3:30 (IRST)

Mansureh-ye Olya (Persian: منصوره عليا) (Note: Also romanized as Mansūreh-e-’Olyā and Mansūreh-ye ’Olyā; also known as Manşūreh, Manşūreh-ye Bozorg, and Mansuri) is a village in Hoseyni Rural District of the Central District of Shadegan County, Khuzestan province, Iran.

== Demographics ==
=== Population ===
At the time of the 2006 National Census, the village's population was 3,189 in 605 households. The following census in 2011 counted 3,519 people in 733 households. The 2016 census measured the population of the village as 3,242 people in 758 households. It was the most populous village in its rural district.
