= El Menia =

El Menia المنيعة
- Commune and town
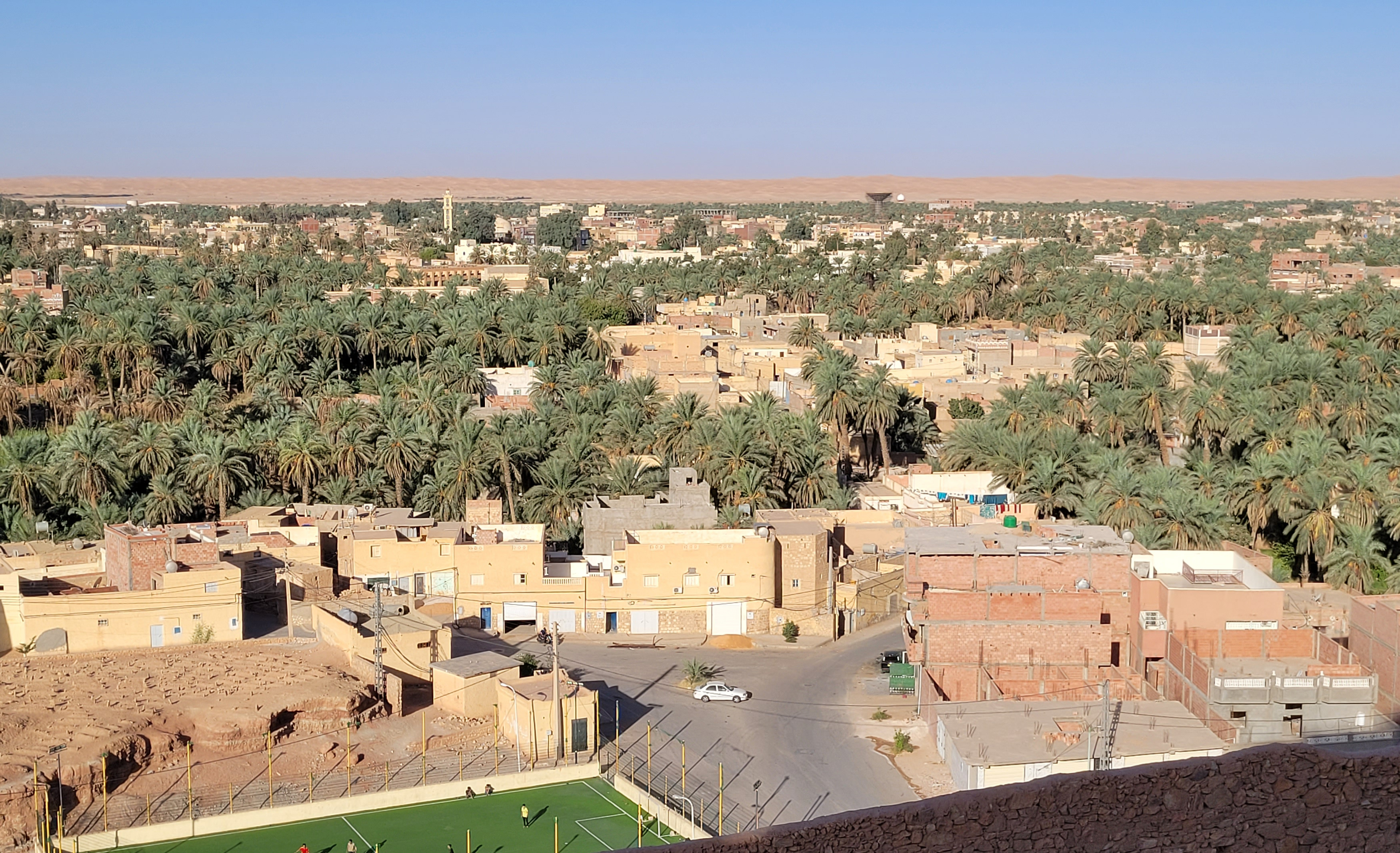
- View of El Menia from the ksar

- Location of El Menia commune within Ghardaïa Province

- Location of El Menia within Algeria
- Coordinates: 30°35′N 2°53′E
- Country: Algeria
- Province: El Menia Province
- District: El Ménia District
- Elevation: 380 m (1,250 ft)

Population (2008)
  - Total: 40,195
- Time zone: UTC+1 (CET)

El Menia (Arabic: المنيعة) is an oasis town and commune, and capital of El Ménia District, in the homonymous El Menia Province, Algeria. The former name is El Goléa (Arabic: القليعة); together in Arabic, the two names mean Impregnable Castle. According to the 2008 census it has a population of 40,195, up from 28,848 in 1998, with an annual growth rate of 3.4%. The area is inhabited by the Zenete Berbers. El Menia oasis grows many agricultural products. The grave of the French priest Charles de Foucauld is located in the town.

== Geography ==
El Menia is located almost at the center of Algeria, lying at the eastern border of the Grand Erg Occidental at an elevation of 380 metres (1,250 ft). The town is a gateway to the Sahara in the south, and has an estimated 180,000 palm trees within the oasis area. The oasis itself lies beneath an escarpment rising up to 200 metres (660 ft) above. Some of the largest continuous areas of Saharan sand dunes begin just a few kilometres to the west of the oasis.

== Climate ==
El Menia has a hot desert climate (Köppen climate classification BWh), with long, extremely hot summers and short, warm winters. There is very little rain throughout the year, and summers are especially dry. Summer daytime temperatures are known to consistently approach 45 °C (113.0 °F). The sky is clear throughout the year and sunny, bright days are guaranteed. On July 7, 2021, the record high temperature of 49.1 °C (120.4 °F) was registered.

Climate data for El Menia (El Golea Airport) 1991–2020
Month	Jan	Feb	Mar	Apr	May	Jun	Jul	Aug	Sep	Oct	Nov	Dec	Year
Record high °C (°F)	27.5 (81.5)	36.5 (97.7)	38.2 (100.8)	43.0 (109.4)	44.2 (111.6)	46.6 (115.9)	49.1 (120.4)	48.0 (118.4)	46.4 (115.5)	42.1 (107.8)	33.8 (92.8)	29.5 (85.1)	49.1 (120.4)
Mean daily maximum °C (°F)	17.5 (63.5)	20.1 (68.2)	—	29.5 (85.1)	34.6 (94.3)	39.6 (103.3)	42.8 (109.0)	41.8 (107.2)	37.4 (99.3)	30.8 (87.4)	23.1 (73.6)	18.3 (64.9)	—
Daily mean °C (°F)	10.1 (50.2)	12.4 (54.3)	16.9 (62.4)	21.5 (70.7)	26.6 (79.9)	31.5 (88.7)	34.6 (94.3)	33.8 (92.8)	29.9 (85.8)	23.4 (74.1)	15.8 (60.4)	11.2 (52.2)	22.3 (72.1)
Mean daily minimum °C (°F)	2.6 (36.7)	4.7 (40.5)	8.9 (48.0)	13.6 (56.5)	18.6 (65.5)	23.3 (73.9)	26.3 (79.3)	25.9 (78.6)	22.4 (72.3)	16.1 (61.0)	8.4 (47.1)	4.1 (39.4)	14.6 (58.3)
Record low °C (°F)	−5.5 (22.1)	−4.6 (23.7)	−2.2 (28.0)	4.0 (39.2)	8.5 (47.3)	12.2 (54.0)	20.0 (68.0)	18.2 (64.8)	11.8 (53.2)	4.9 (40.8)	−1.8 (28.8)	−4.5 (23.9)	−9.4 (15.1)
Average precipitation mm (inches)	6.6 (0.26)	1.8 (0.07)	7.2 (0.28)	2.9 (0.11)	2.4 (0.09)	0.4 (0.02)	0.0 (0.0)	0.7 (0.03)	5.5 (0.22)	4.7 (0.19)	4.6 (0.18)	4.1 (0.16)	40.9 (1.61)
Average precipitation days (≥ 1.0 mm)	0.9	0.4	0.9	0.4	0.5	0.2	0.0	0.2	0.8	0.8	0.9	0.7	6.7
Source: NOAA

== Transportation ==
El Menia has good road connections along the N1 highway to Ghardaïa to the north and In Salah to the south. El Golea Airport is located 3 kilometres (1.9 mi) west of the town's center.

== Education ==
6.9% of the population has a tertiary education, and another 17.3% has completed secondary education. The overall literacy rate is 81.4%, and is 85.4% among males and 77.2% among females.

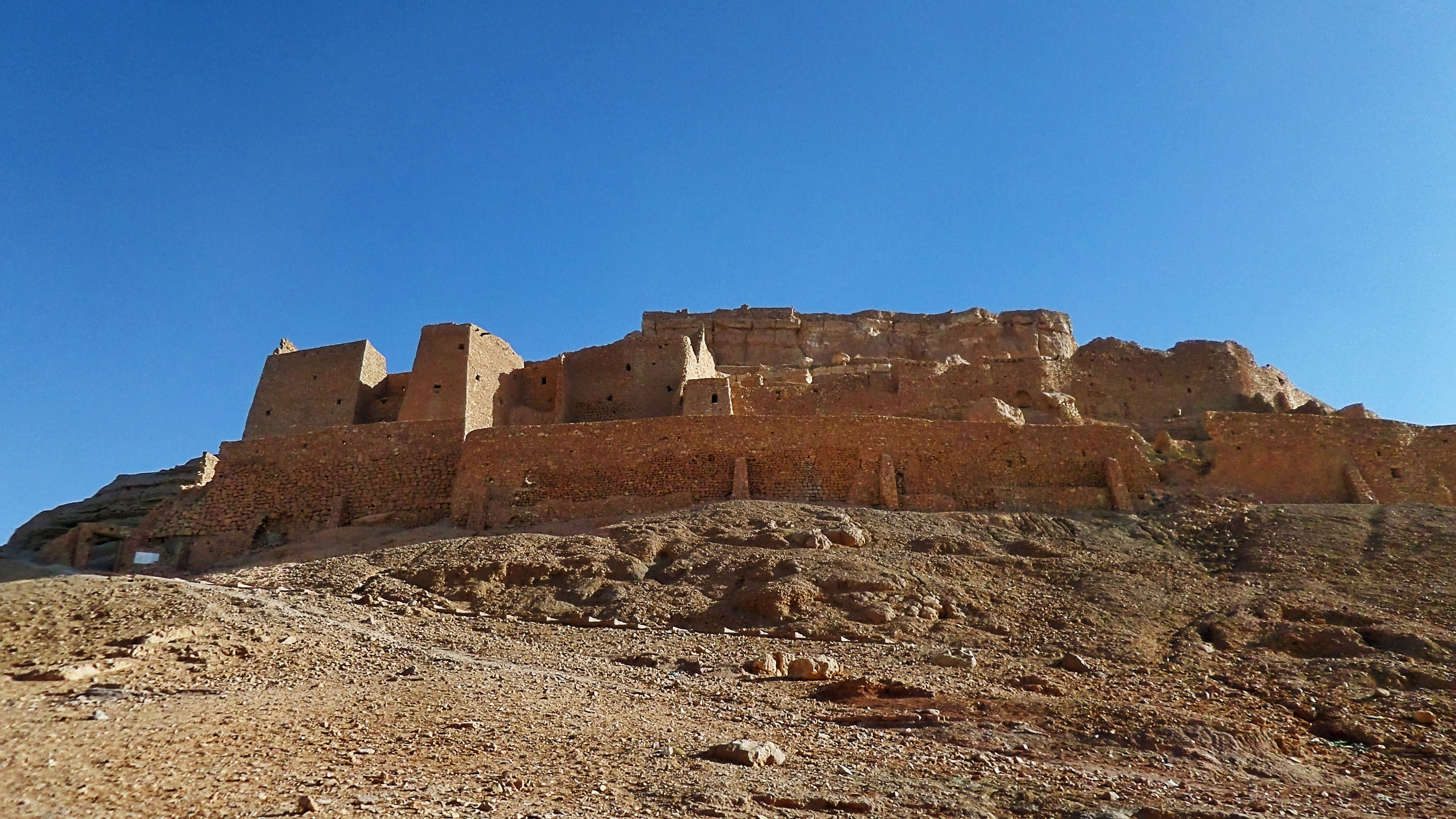
The old ksar.

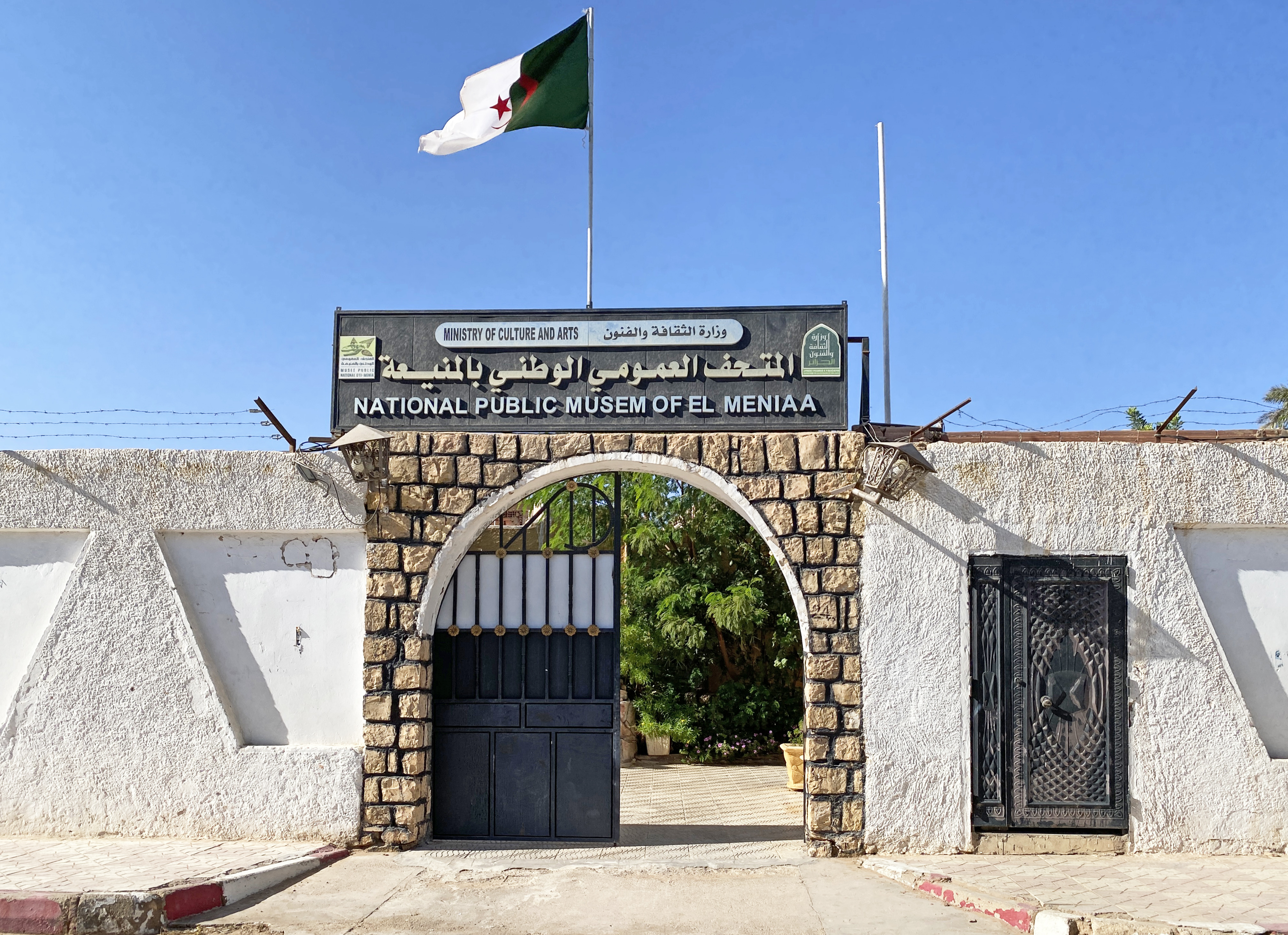
Public National Museum of El Menia.

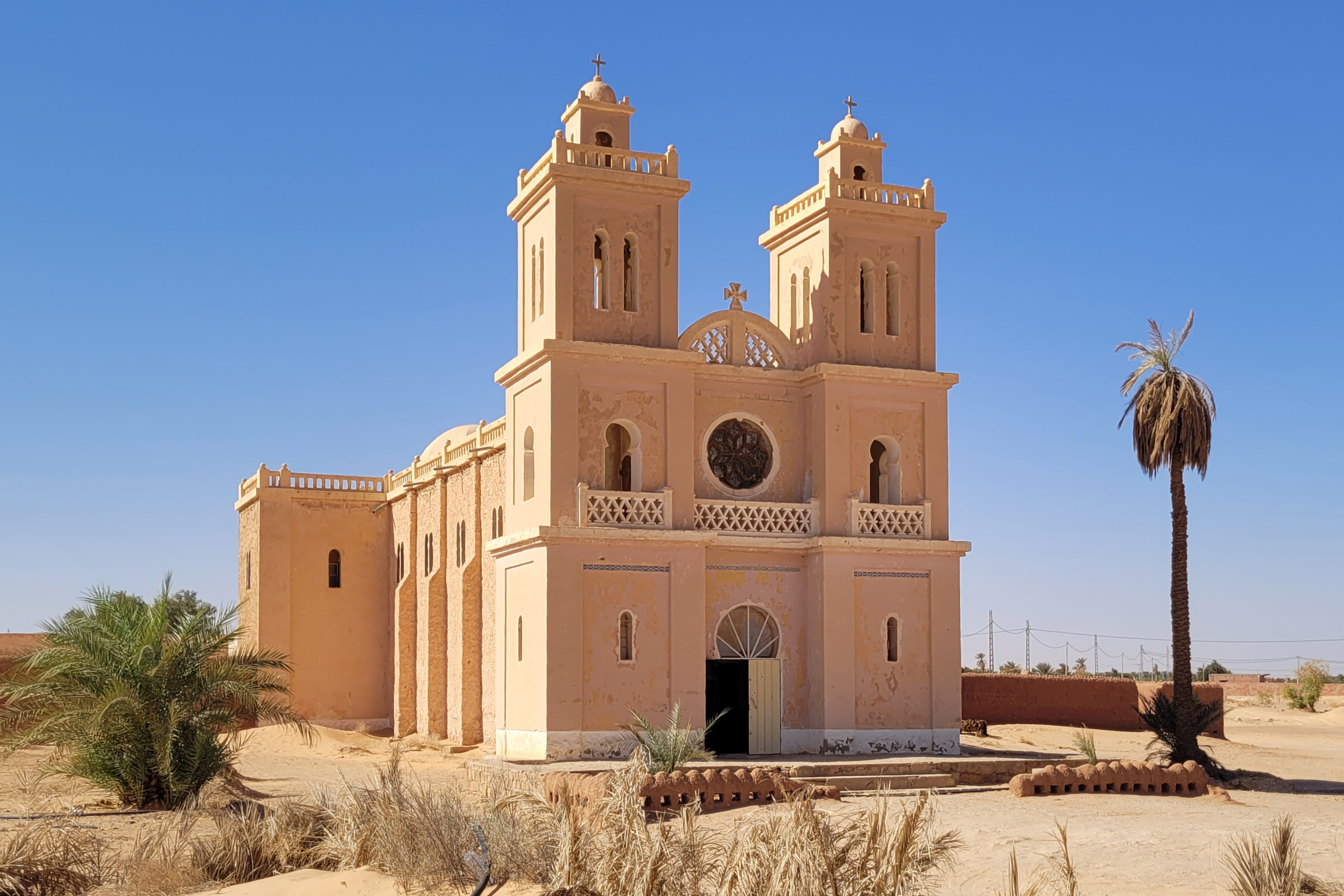
St. Joseph Church

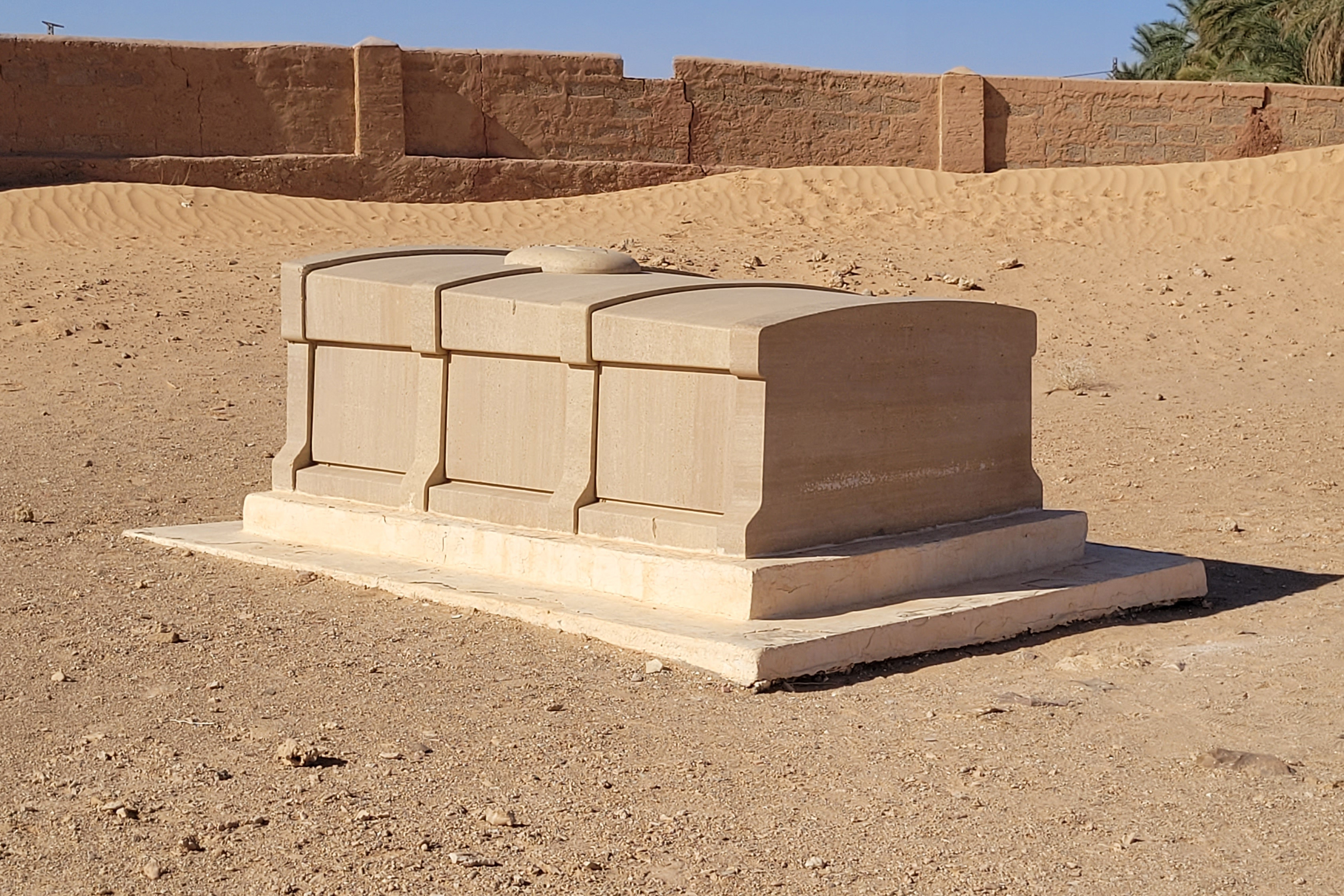
Grave of Charles de Foucauld.

== Localities ==
The commune of El Menia is composed of 12 localities:

- Centre-ville
- Taghit
- Belbachir
- Hoffrat El Abbas
- Vieux Ksar
- Badriane
- Belaïd
- Zouitel
- Ouled Zid
- Tin Bouzid
- Ksar Belkacem
- Ouled Feradj
