= Anaqcheh Rural District (Bavi County) =

Rural district in Khuzestan province, Iran

Anaqcheh Rural District Persian: دهستان عناقچه
- Rural District
- Location within Iran
- Coordinates: 31°33′37″N 48°47′23″E
- Country: Iran
- Province: Khuzestan
- County: Bavi
- District: Central
- Capital: Amashiyeh-ye Yek

Population (2016)
  - Total: 10,321
- Time zone: UTC+3:30 (IRST)

Anaqcheh Rural District (Persian: دهستان عناقچه) is in the Central District of Bavi County, Khuzestan province, Iran. Its capital is the village of Amashiyeh-ye Yek.

== History ==
After the National Census of 2006, Bavi District was separated from Ahvaz County in the establishment of Bavi County, and Anaqcheh Rural District was created in the new Central District.

== Demographics ==
=== Population ===
At the time of the 2011 census, the rural district's population was 9,005 in 2,112 households. The 2016 census measured the population of the rural district as 10,321 in 2,737 households. The most populous of its 31 villages was Seffak, with 869 people.
