= Anjirak =

Anjirak or Anjirk (Persian: انجيرك) may refer to:

== Afghanistan ==
- Anjirak (Afghanistan), a mountain pass

== Iran ==
=== Fars Province ===
- Anjirak, Fars, a village in Estahban County

=== Hormozgan Province ===
- Anjirak, Hormozgan

=== Kerman Province ===
- Anjirak, Anbarabad
- Anjirak, Baft
- Anjirak, Narmashir

=== Kermanshah Province ===
- Anjirak, Eslamabad-e Gharb
- Anjirak, Howmeh-ye Jonubi, Eslamabad-e Gharb County
- Anjirak, Harsin
- Anjirak, Kermanshah

=== Khuzestan Province ===
- Anjirak, Khuzestan

=== Markazi Province ===
- Anjirak, Markazi

=== Sistan and Baluchestan Province ===
- Anjirak (1), Irandegan, a village in Khash County
- Anjirak (2), Irandegan, a village in Khash County
- Anjirak, Mehrestan, a village in Mehrestan County

=== Yazd Province ===
- Anjirak, Yazd
