= Kamareh =

Kamareh or Kamarah (Persian: كمره) may refer to:

- Kamareh, Kermanshah
- Kamareh-ye Gharbi, Kermanshah Province
- Kamareh-ye Olya, Kermanshah Province
- Kamareh-ye Sofla, Kermanshah Province
- Kamareh, Kurdistan
- Kamareh, Lorestan
- Kamareh, Markazi
- Kamareh District
- Kamareh-ye Bala
- Kamareh-ye Hashem Beg
- Kamareh-ye Heshmatabad
- Kamareh-ye Mishnan
