= Siah Siah =

Siah Siah (Persian: سياه سياه) may refer to various places in Iran:

- Siah Siah, Ilam
- Siah Siah, Gilan-e Gharb, Kermanshah Province
- Siah Siah, Ravansar, Kermanshah Province
- Siah Siah-ye Habib, Kermanshah Province
- Siah Siah-ye Khosravi, Kermanshah Province
- Siah Siah-ye Sheykheh, Kermanshah Province
- Siah Siah-e Dayar, Kermanshah Province

== See also ==
- Sia Sia (disambiguation), various places in Iran
