= Soveyseh =

Soveyseh or Savaiseh (Persian: سويسه) may refer to:

- Soveyseh-ye Sadat
- Soveyseh-ye Saleh
- Soveyseh-ye Seh
- Soveyseh District
- Soveyseh Rural District
