= Shian (disambiguation) =

Shian is a village in Kurdistan Province, Iran.

Shian or Shiyan or Sheyan (Persian: شيان) may also refer to:

- Shian, Isfahan
- Shian, alternate name of Shuhan-e Sofla, Kermanshah
- Qaleh-ye Shian, Kermanshah Province
- Shian, Salas-e Babajani, Kermanshah Province
- Shiyan Rural District, in Kermanshah Province
- Shïan Smith-Pancorvo, an English musician

== See also ==
- Yon
- Yonaka
