= Baricheh =

Baricheh or Bereycheh or Bericheh (Persian: بريچه) may refer to:

- Baricheh, Ahvaz
- Baricheh, Karun
- Baricheh-ye Enayat
- Bereycheh, Shadegan
