= Khosravi =

Khosravi (Persian: خسروي) (also spelled Khesrawi, Khosrovi, Khusravi, Khusrawi, Khusrovi or Khosrowvi) may refer to various places in Iran. It is also a common family name for people of Iranian origin.

== Places ==
=== Alborz province ===
- Arababad-e Khosravi, a village in Chaharbagh County

=== Kermanshah province ===
- Siah Siah-ye Khosravi, a village in Eslamabad-e Gharb County
- Kureh-ye Khosravi, a village in Kermanshah County
- Khosravi, Kermanshah, a village in Qasr-e Shirin County

=== Khuzestan province ===
- Istgah-e Khosravi, a village also known as Khosravi in Ahvaz County
- Khosraviyeh, Khuzestan, a village also known as Khosravi in Karun County

=== South Khorasan province ===
- Khosravi, Nehbandan, a village in Nehbandan County
- Khosravi, Qaen, a village in Qaen County

== People with the family name Khosravi ==
- Ali Khosravi (born 1961), Iranian association football referee
- Amir Cheshme Khosravi (born 1998), Iranian footballer
- Arghavan Khosravi (born 1984), Iranian-born American painter and sculptor
- Golnoosh Khosravi (born 2001), Iranian football player
- Hamed Khosravi (born 1992), Iranian football player
- Koueistan Khosravi (born 1985), Iranian football player
- Mahafarid Amir Khosravi (1969–2011), Iranian businessperson who was executed
- Meysam Khosravi (born 1983), Iranian football player
- Mohammad Ali Khosravi (born 2001), Iranian taekwondoka
- Ramin Khosravi (born 1984), Iranian football player
- Sirvan Khosravi (born 1982), Iranian singer, songwriter, and music producer
- Xaniar Khosravi (born 1985), Iranian singer. composer, lyricist and music arranger
- Yasin Khosravi (born 1992), Iranian para-athlete
- Gholamreza Khosravi Savadjani (1965–2014), Iranian political prisoner who was executed
- Mahmoud Khosravi Vafa (born 1953), Iranian conservative politician
- Nosratollah Khosravi-Roodsari, Iranian-American who was freed during a prisoner exchange

== See also ==
Khosraviyeh (disambiguation)
