= Shalheh-ye Fazeli =

Shalheh-ye Fazeli شلحه فاضلي
- Village
- Location within Iran
- Coordinates: 31°14′46″N 48°34′02″E
- Country: Iran
- Province: Khuzestan
- County: Karun
- Bakhsh: Central
- Rural District: Kut-e Abdollah

Population (2006)
  - Total: 46
- Time zone: UTC+3:30 (IRST)
  - Summer (DST): UTC+4:30 (IRDT)

Shalheh-ye Fazeli (Persian: شلحه فاضلي, also Romanized as Shalheh-ye Fāẕelī) is a village in Kut-e Abdollah Rural District, in the Central District of Karun County, Khuzestan Province, Iran. At the 2006 census, its population was 46, in 7 families.
