= Qaleh Tarfi =

Qaleh Tarfi قلعه طرفي
- Village
- Location within Iran
- Coordinates: 31°07′22″N 48°35′16″E
- Country: Iran
- Province: Khuzestan
- County: Ahvaz
- Bakhsh: Soveyseh
- Rural District: Soveyseh

Population (2006)
  - Total: 529
- Time zone: UTC+3:30 (IRST)
  - Summer (DST): UTC+4:30 (IRDT)

Qaleh Tarfi (Persian: قلعه طرفي, also Romanized as Qal‘eh Ţarfī and Qal‘eh-ye Ţarfī) is a village in Soveyseh Rural District, in the Soveyseh District of Karun County, Khuzestan Province, Iran. At the 2006 census, its population was 529, in 83 families.
