= Abu Mosheyleysh =

Abu Mosheyleysh ابومشيلش
- Village
- Location within Iran
- Coordinates: 31°03′34″N 48°23′20″E
- Country: Iran
- Province: Khuzestan
- County: Karun
- Bakhsh: Soveyseh
- Rural District: Muran

Population (2006)
  - Total: 208
- Time zone: UTC+3:30 (IRST)
  - Summer (DST): UTC+4:30 (IRDT)

Abu Mosheyleysh (Persian: ابومشيلش, also Romanized as Abū Mosheyleysh, Aboo Meshilesh, and Abū Mashīlīsh) is a village in Muran Rural District, in the Soveyseh District of Karun County, Khuzestan Province, Iran. At the 2006 census, its population was 208, in 41 families.
