= Shirin Shahr =

City in Khuzestan province, Iran

Shirin Shahr Persian: شیرین شهر
- City
- Location within Iran
- Coordinates: 31°05′07″N 48°26′36″E
- Country: Iran
- Province: Khuzestan
- County: Karun
- District: Soveyseh
- Elevation: 10 m (33 ft)
- Time zone: UTC+3:30 (IRST)
- Website: www.shirinshahr.com

Shirin Shahr (Persian: شیرین شهر) is a new planned city in Soveyseh District of Karun County, Khuzestan province, Iran. It is intended to house the personnel of the sugar industry in the area. The name Shirin Shahr translates as "sweet city" in English.

== History ==
After the 2011 National Census, Kut-e Abdollah and Soveyseh Rural Districts were separated from Ahvaz County in the establishment of Karun County, which was divided into the Central and Soveyseh Districts.
