= Hadiabad, Khuzestan =

Neighborhood in Khuzestan province, Iran

Hadiabad Persian: هادی اباد
- Neighborhood
- Location within Iran
- Coordinates: 31°13′24″N 48°39′05″E
- Country: Iran
- Province: Khuzestan
- County: Karun
- District: Central
- City: Kut-e Abdollah

Population (2011)
  - Total: 4,264
- Time zone: UTC+3:30 (IRST)

Hadiabad (Persian: هادی اباد) (Note: Also romanized as Hādīābād) is a neighborhood in the city of Kut-e Abdollah in the Central District of Ahvaz County, Khuzestan province, Iran.

== Demographics ==
=== Population ===
At the time of the 2006 National Census, the village's population was 3,911 in 711 households, when it was in Kut-e Abdollah Rural District of the Central District of Ahvaz County. The following census in 2011 counted 4,264 people in 835 households.

After the census, the rural district was separated from the county in the establishment of Karun County and transferred to the new Central District. The village of Kut-e Abdollah merged with Astishan, Darvishabad, Gavmishabad, Gondamakar, Hadiabad, Khazami, Kut-e Navaser, Kuy-e Montazeri, and Shariati-ye Yek to form the city of Kut-e Abdollah.
