= Kut-e Seyyed Saleh =

Kut-e Seyyed Saleh كوتسيدصالح
- Village
- Location within Iran
- Coordinates: 31°13′50″N 48°38′32″E
- Country: Iran
- Province: Khuzestan
- County: Karun
- Bakhsh: Central
- Rural District: Kut-e Abdollah

Population (2006)
  - Total: 3,945
- Time zone: UTC+3:30 (IRST)
  - Summer (DST): UTC+4:30 (IRDT)

Kut-e Seyyed Saleh (Persian: كوتسيدصالح, also Romanized as Kūt-e Seyyed Şāleḩ, Kooté Sayyed Saleh, and Kūt Saiyid Salih) is a village in Kut-e Abdollah Rural District, in the Central District of Karun County, Khuzestan Province, Iran. At the 2006 census, its population was 3,945, in 773 families.
