= Amireh =

Neighborhood in Khuzestan province, Iran

Amireh Persian: عميره
- Neighborhood
- Location within Iran
- Coordinates: 31°14′22″N 48°37′01″E
- Country: Iran
- Province: Khuzestan
- County: Karun
- District: Central
- City: Rabi

Population (2016)
  - Total: 891
- Time zone: UTC+3:30 (IRST)

Amireh (Persian: عميره) (Note: Also romanized as ‘Amīreh; also known as Amīrīyeh, Kūt-e ‘Omayr, Kūt-e-‘Omeyr, ‘Omeyr, ‘Omeyreh, Roḩeymeh, and Ruhaimah) is a neighborhood in the city of Rabi of the Central District of Karun County, Khuzestan province, Iran.

== Demographics ==
=== Population ===
At the time of the 2006 National Census, the village's population was 871 in 201 households, when it was in Kut-e Abdollah Rural District of the Central District of Ahvaz County. The following census in 2011 counted 981 people in 238 households, The 2016 census measured the population of the village as 891 people in 277 households, by which time the rural district had been separated from the county in the establishment of Karun County and was transferred to the new Central District.

In 2017, the villages of Abu Dabis, Amireh, Jongiyeh, and Kuy-e Vali Aser were merged to form the new city of Rabi.
