= Valiyeh =

Valiyeh وعيليه
- Village
- Location within Iran
- Coordinates: 31°10′42″N 48°32′28″E
- Country: Iran
- Province: Khuzestan
- County: Karun
- Bakhsh: Central
- Rural District: Kut-e Abdollah

Population (2006)
  - Total: 846
- Time zone: UTC+3:30 (IRST)
  - Summer (DST): UTC+4:30 (IRDT)

Valiyeh (Persian: وعيليه, also Romanized as V‘alīyeh; also known as Loveylīyeh and Luailīyeh) is a village in Kut-e Abdollah Rural District, in the Central District of Karun County, Khuzestan Province, Iran. At the 2006 census, its population was 846, in 147 families.
