= Tarfayeh =

Tarfayeh طرفايه
- Village
- Location within Iran
- Coordinates: 31°09′37″N 48°30′00″E
- Country: Iran
- Province: Khuzestan
- County: Karun
- Bakhsh: Soveyseh
- Rural District: Muran

Population (2006)
  - Total: 732
- Time zone: UTC+3:30 (IRST)
  - Summer (DST): UTC+4:30 (IRDT)

Tarfayeh (Persian: طرفايه, also Romanized as Ţarfāyeh) is a village in Muran Rural District, in the Soveyseh District of Karun County, Khuzestan Province, Iran. At the 2006 census, its population was 732 in 140 families.
