= Tasyesat-e Kut-e Amir =

Tasyesat-e Kut-e Amir تاسيسات كوت امير
- Village
- Location within Iran
- Coordinates: 31°13′38″N 48°36′28″E
- Country: Iran
- Province: Khuzestan
- County: Karun
- Bakhsh: Central
- Rural District: Kut-e Abdollah

Population (2006)
  - Total: 851
- Time zone: UTC+3:30 (IRST)
  - Summer (DST): UTC+4:30 (IRDT)

Tasyesat-e Kut-e Amir (Persian: تاسيسات كوت امير, also Romanized as Tāsyesāt-e Kūt-e Amīr; also known as Kūt-e Amīr) is a village in Kut-e Abdollah Rural District, in the Central District of Karun County, Khuzestan Province, Iran. At the 2006 census, its population was 851, in 161 families.
