= Kuy-e Vali Aser =

Neighborhood in Khuzestan province, Iran

Kuy-e Vali Aser Persian: كوي ولي عصر
- Neighborhood
- Location within Iran
- Country: Iran
- Province: Khuzestan
- County: Karun
- District: Central
- City: Rabi

Population (2016)
  - Total: 1,490
- Time zone: UTC+3:30 (IRST)

Kuy-e Vali Aser (Persian: كوي ولي عصر) (Note: Also romanized as Kūy-e Valī ʿAṣer) is a neighborhood in the city of Rabi of the Central District of Karun County, Khuzestan province, Iran.

== Demographics ==
=== Population ===
At the time of the 2006 National Census, the village's population was 1,803 in 354 households, when it was in Kut-e Abdollah Rural District of the Central District of Ahvaz County. The following census in 2011 counted 1,793 people in 453 households, The 2016 census measured the population of the village as 1,490 people in 413 households, by which time the rural district had been separated from the county in the establishment of Karun County and was transferred to the new Central District.

In 2017, the villages of Abu Dabis, Amireh, Jongiyeh, and Kuy-e Vali Aser were merged to form the new city of Rabi.
