= Khenziri =

Khenziri خنضيري
- Village
- Location within Iran
- Coordinates: 31°04′59″N 48°42′26″E
- Country: Iran
- Province: Khuzestan
- County: Karun
- Bakhsh: Soveyseh
- Rural District: Soveyseh

Population (2006)
  - Total: 116
- Time zone: UTC+3:30 (IRST)
  - Summer (DST): UTC+4:30 (IRDT)

Khenziri (Persian: خنضيري, also Romanized as Khenẕīrī and Khān Ziri; also known as Khenfīrī) is a village in Soveyseh Rural District, in the Soveyseh District of Karun County, Khuzestan Province, Iran. At the 2006 census, its population was 116, in 15 families.
