= Omeyshiyeh-ye Bozorg =

Omeyshiyeh-ye Bozorg عميشيه بزرگ
- Village
- Location within Iran
- Coordinates: 31°09′41″N 48°30′52″E
- Country: Iran
- Province: Khuzestan
- County: Karun
- Bakhsh: Soveyseh
- Rural District: Muran

Population (2006)
  - Total: 801
- Time zone: UTC+3:30 (IRST)
  - Summer (DST): UTC+4:30 (IRDT)

Omeyshiyeh-ye Bozorg (Persian: عميشيه بزرگ, also Romanized as ‘Omeyshīyeh-ye Bozorg, ‘Ommūshīyeh-ye Bozorg, and ‘Omowshīyeh-ye Bozorg) is a village in Muran Rural District, in the Soveyseh District of Karun County, Khuzestan Province, Iran. At the 2006 census, its population was 801, in 175 families.
