= Hanatiyeh =

Hanatiyeh حنيطه
- Village
- Location within Iran
- Coordinates: 31°02′11″N 48°48′04″E
- Country: Iran
- Province: Khuzestan
- County: Karun
- Bakhsh: Central
- Rural District: Qaleh Chenan

Population (2006)
  - Total: 127
- Time zone: UTC+3:30 (IRST)
  - Summer (DST): UTC+4:30 (IRDT)

Hanatiyeh (Persian: حنيطه, also Romanized as Ḩanaţīyeh; also known as Ḩanīţīyeh and Khanaţīyeh) is a village in Qaleh Chenan Rural District, in the Central District of Karun County, Khuzestan Province, Iran. At the 2006 census, its population was 127, in 16 families.
