= Gavmishabad, Karun =

Neighborhood in Khuzestan province, Iran

Gavmishabad Persian: گاوميش‌آباد
- Neighborhood
- Location within Iran
- Coordinates: 31°14′50″N 48°39′24″E
- Country: Iran
- Province: Khuzestan
- County: Karun
- District: Central
- City: Kut-e Abdollah

Population (2011)
  - Total: 3,604
- Time zone: UTC+3:30 (IRST)

Gavmishabad (Persian: گاوميش‌آباد) (Note: Also romanized as Gāvmīshābād; also known as Golshan) is a neighborhood in the city of Kut-e Abdollah in the Central District of Ahvaz County, Khuzestan province, Iran.

== Demographics ==
=== Population ===
At the time of the 2006 National Census, the village's population was 3,976 in 600 households, when it was in Kut-e Abdollah Rural District of the Central District of Ahvaz County. The following census in 2011 counted 3,604 people in 697 households.

After the census, the rural district was separated from the county in the establishment of Karun County and transferred to the new Central District. The village of Kut-e Abdollah merged with Astishan, Darvishabad, Gavmishabad, Gondamakar, Hadiabad, Khazami, Kut-e Navaser, Kuy-e Montazeri, and Shariati-ye Yek to form the city of Kut-e Abdollah.
