= Qaleh-ye Hajji Mazid =

Qaleh-ye Hajji Mazid قلعه حاجي مزيد
- Village
- Country: Iran
- Province: Khuzestan
- County: Karun
- Bakhsh: Central
- Rural District: Kut-e Abdollah

Population (2006)
  - Total: 334
- Time zone: UTC+3:30 (IRST)
  - Summer (DST): UTC+4:30 (IRDT)

Qaleh-ye Hajji Mazid (Persian: قلعه حاجي مزيد, also Romanized as Qal‘eh-ye Ḩājjī Mazīd) is a village in Kut-e Abdollah Rural District, in the Central District of Karun County, Khuzestan Province, Iran. At the 2006 census, its population was 334, in 61 families.
