= Al Aqda =

Village in Khuzestan province, Iran

Al Aqda Persian: العقدا
- Village
- Location within Iran
- Coordinates: 31°10′24″N 48°41′48″E
- Country: Iran
- Province: Khuzestan
- County: Karun
- District: Central
- Rural District: Qaleh Chanan

Population (2016)
  - Total: 443
- Time zone: UTC+3:30 (IRST)

Al Aqda (Persian: العقدا) (Note: Also romanized as Al ‘Aqdā; also known as Al Agdah, Al ‘Oqdeh, ‘Alī ‘Agad, ‘Alī ‘Agdeh, Ali Akdeh, Kūt Saiyid Husain, and Parvast) is a village in Qaleh Chanan Rural District of the Central District of Karun County, Khuzestan province, Iran, serving as capital of both the district and the rural district.

== Demographics ==
=== Population ===
At the time of the 2006 National Census, the village's population was 415 in 73 households, when it was in Soveyseh Rural District of the Central District of Ahvaz County. The following census in 2011 counted 301 people in 61 households. The 2016 census measured the population of the village as 443 people in 90 households, by which time the rural district had been separated from the county in the establishment of Karun County. The rural district was transferred to the new Soveyseh District, and Al Aqda was transferred to Qaleh Chanan Rural District created in the new Central District.
