= Sia Sia =

Sia Sia or Siya Siya (Persian: سيا سيا) may refer to various places in Iran:

- Sia Sia-ye Habib
- Sia Sia-ye Keykhosrow
- Sia Sia-ye Sheykheh

== See also ==
- Siah Siah (disambiguation), various places in Iran
