= Kuy-e Montazeri =

Neighborhood in Khuzestan province, Iran

Kuy-e Montazeri Persian: كوت نواصر
- Neighborhood
- Location within Iran
- Coordinates: 31°14′15″N 48°40′41″E
- Country: Iran
- Province: Khuzestan
- County: Karun
- District: Central
- City: Kut-e Abdollah

Population (2011)
  - Total: 1,860
- Time zone: UTC+3:30 (IRST)

Kuy-e Montazeri (Persian: كوی منتظری) (Note: Also romanized as Kūy-e Montaz̧erī) is a neighborhood in the city of Kut-e Abdollah in the Central District of Ahvaz County, Khuzestan province, Iran.

== Demographics ==
=== Population ===
At the time of the 2006 National Census, the village's population was 1,145 in 182 households, when it was in Kut-e Abdollah Rural District of the Central District of Ahvaz County. The following census in 2011 counted 1,860 people in 414 households.

After the census, the rural district was separated from the county in the establishment of Karun County and transferred to the new Central District. The village of Kut-e Abdollah merged with Astishan, Darvishabad, Gavmishabad, Gondamakar, Hadiabad, Khazami, Kut-e Navaser, Kuy-e Montazeri, and Shariati-ye Yek to form the city of Kut-e Abdollah.
