= Kut-e Navaser =

Neighborhood in Khuzestan province, Iran

Kut-e Navaser Persian: كوت نواصر
- Neighborhood
- Location within Iran
- Coordinates: 31°13′21″N 48°39′35″E
- Country: Iran
- Province: Khuzestan
- County: Karun
- District: Central
- City: Kut-e Abdollah

Population (2011)
  - Total: 5,560
- Time zone: UTC+3:30 (IRST)

Kut-e Navaser (Persian: كوت نواصر) (Note: Also romanized as Kūt on Navāşer and Kūt-e Navāşer) is a neighborhood in the city of Kut-e Abdollah in the Central District of Ahvaz County, Khuzestan province, Iran.

== Demographics ==
=== Population ===
At the time of the 2006 National Census, the village's population was 5,217 in 921 households, when it was in Kut-e Abdollah Rural District of the Central District of Ahvaz County. The following census in 2011 counted 5,560 people in 1,255 households.

After the census, the rural district was separated from the county in the establishment of Karun County and transferred to the new Central District. The village of Kut-e Abdollah merged with Astishan, Darvishabad, Gavmishabad, Gondamakar, Hadiabad, Khazami, Kut-e Navaser, Kuy-e Montazeri, and Shariati-ye Yek to form the city of Kut-e Abdollah.
