= Mozaffariyeh =

Village in Khuzestan province, Iran

Mozaffariyeh مظفریه
- Village
- Location within Iran
- Coordinates: 31°13′35″N 48°35′53″E
- Country: Iran
- Province: Khuzestan
- County: Karun
- District: Central
- Rural District: Kut-e Abdollah

Population (2016)
  - Total: 1,005
- Time zone: UTC+3:30 (IRST)

Mozaffariyeh (Persian: مظفریه) (Note: Also romanized as Moz̧affarīyeh; also known as Moz̧affarī and Muzzafari) is a village in, and the capital of, Kut-e Abdollah Rural District of the Central District of Karun County, Khuzestan province, Iran. The previous capital of the rural district was the village of Bahar, and prior to that, the village of Kut-e Abdollah, now a city.

== Demographics ==
=== Population ===
At the time of the 2006 National Census, the village's population was 1,104 in 204 households, when it was in the Central District of Ahvaz County. The following census in 2011 counted 824 people in 176 households. The 2016 census measured the population of the village as 1,005 people in 274 households, by which time the rural district had been separated from the county in the establishment of Karun County and transferred to the new Central District.
