= Eslamabad-e Do =

Eslamabad-e Do اسلام اباددو
- Village
- Location within Iran
- Coordinates: 31°10′31″N 48°37′39″E
- Country: Iran
- Province: Khuzestan
- County: Karun
- Bakhsh: Central
- Rural District: Kut-e Abdollah

Population (2006)
  - Total: 376
- Time zone: UTC+3:30 (IRST)
  - Summer (DST): UTC+4:30 (IRDT)

Eslamabad-e Do (Persian: اسلام اباددو, also Romanized as Eslāmābād-e Do; also known as Eslāmābād) is a village in Kut-e Abdollah Rural District, in the Central District of Karun County, Khuzestan Province, Iran. At the 2006 census, its population was 376, in 68 families.
