= Chamian =

Chamian چميان
- Village
- Location within Iran
- Coordinates: 30°59′51″N 48°23′00″E
- Country: Iran
- Province: Khuzestan
- County: Karun
- Bakhsh: Soveyseh
- Rural District: Muran

Population (2006)
  - Total: 1,392
- Time zone: UTC+3:30 (IRST)
  - Summer (DST): UTC+4:30 (IRDT)

Chamian (Persian: چميان, also Romanized as Chamīān, Chemīyān, and Chimaiyān) is a village in Muran Rural District, in the Soveyseh District of Karun County, Khuzestan Province, Iran. At the 2006 census, its population was 1,392, in 291 families.
