= Abu Dabis =

Neighborhood in Khuzestan province, Iran

Abu Dabis Persian: ابودبس
- Neighborhood
- Location within Iran
- Coordinates: 31°14′55″N 48°37′47″E
- Country: Iran
- Province: Khuzestan
- County: Karun
- District: Central
- City: Rabi

Population (2016)
  - Total: 1,404
- Time zone: UTC+3:30 (IRST)

Abu Dabis (Persian: ابودبس) (Note: Also romanized as Ābū Dabis) is a neighborhood in the city of Rabi of the Central District of Karun County, Khuzestan province, Iran.

== Demographics ==
=== Population ===
At the time of the 2006 National Census, the village's population was 1,475 in 294 households, when it was in Kut-e Abdollah Rural District of the Central District of Ahvaz County. The following census in 2011 counted 1,427 people in 348 households, The 2016 census measured the population of the village as 1,404 people in 392 households, by which time the rural district had been separated from the county in the establishment of Karun County and was transferred to the new Central District.

In 2017, the villages of Abu Dabis, Amireh, Jongiyeh, and Kuy-e Vali Aser were merged to form the new city of Rabi.
