= Shariati-ye Yek =

Neighborhood in Khuzestan province, Iran

Shariati-ye Yek Persian: شریعتی یک
- Neighborhood
- Location within Iran
- Coordinates: 31°14′40″N 48°39′42″E
- Country: Iran
- Province: Khuzestan
- County: Karun
- District: Central
- City: Kut-e Abdollah

Population (2011)
  - Total: 16,412
- Time zone: UTC+3:30 (IRST)

Shariati-ye Yek (Persian: شريعتی یک) (Note: Also romanized as Sharīʿatī-ye Yek) is a neighborhood in the city of Kut-e Abdollah in the Central District of Ahvaz County, Khuzestan province, Iran.

== Demographics ==
=== Population ===
At the time of the 2006 National Census, the village's population was 16,518 in 3,171 households, when it was in Kut-e Abdollah Rural District of the Central District of Ahvaz County. The following census in 2011 counted 16,412 people in 3,717 households.

After the census, the rural district was separated from the county in the establishment of Karun County and transferred to the new Central District. The village of Kut-e Abdollah merged with Astishan, Darvishabad, Gavmishabad, Gondamakar, Hadiabad, Khazami, Kut-e Navaser, Kuy-e Montazeri, and Shariati-ye Yek to form the city of Kut-e Abdollah.
