= Khezeriyeh =

Khezeriyeh خضريه
- Village
- Location within Iran
- Coordinates: 30°57′20″N 48°32′14″E
- Country: Iran
- Province: Khuzestan
- County: Karun
- Bakhsh: Soveyseh
- Rural District: Soveyseh

Population (2006)
  - Total: 312
- Time zone: UTC+3:30 (IRST)
  - Summer (DST): UTC+4:30 (IRDT)

Khezeriyeh (Persian: خضريه, also Romanized as Khezerīyeh, Khezrīyeh, Khazarīyeh, and Khazrīyeh; also known as Khaẕrīāt) is a village in Soveyseh Rural District, in the Soveyseh District of Karun County, Khuzestan Province, Iran. At the 2006 census, its population was 312, in 57 families.
