= Beykzadeh =

Bekzadeh بك زاده
- Village
- Location within Iran
- Coordinates: 33°59′00″N 46°38′46″E
- Country: Iran
- Province: Kermanshah
- County: Eslamabad-e Gharb
- Bakhsh: Central
- Rural District: Howmeh-ye Jonubi
- Established: 1880

Population (2006)
  - Total: 202
- Time zone: UTC+3:30 (IRST)
  - Summer (DST): UTC+4:30 (IRDT)

Bekzadeh (Persian: بك زاده, also Romanized as Bekzādeh; also known as Bagzādeh, Begzādeh, Sīā Sīā Beg Zādeh, and Sīāsīā-ye Bag Zādeh) is a village in Howmeh-ye Jonubi Rural District, in the Central District of Eslamabad-e Gharb County, Kermanshah Province, Iran. At the 2006 census, its population was 202, in 46 families.
