= Kotkoti =

Kotkoti كت كتي
- Village
- Location within Iran
- Coordinates: 34°04′00″N 46°43′00″E
- Country: Iran
- Province: Kermanshah
- County: Eslamabad-e Gharb
- Bakhsh: Central
- Rural District: Shiyan

Population (2006)
  - Total: 264
- Time zone: UTC+3:30 (IRST)
  - Summer (DST): UTC+4:30 (IRDT)

Kotkoti (Persian: كت كتي, also Romanized as Kotkotī; also known as Kotkotī-ye Shīān) is a village in Shiyan Rural District, in the Central District of Eslamabad-e Gharb County, Kermanshah Province, Iran. At the 2006 census, its population was 264, in 59 families.
