= Atash, Iran =

Atash عطيش
- Village
- Location within Iran
- Coordinates: 30°54′44″N 48°40′05″E
- Country: Iran
- Province: Khuzestan
- County: Ahvaz
- Bakhsh: Soveyseh
- Rural District: Soveyseh

Population (2006)
  - Total: 417
- Time zone: UTC+3:30 (IRST)
  - Summer (DST): UTC+4:30 (IRDT)

Atash (Persian: عطيش, also Romanized as ‘Aţash; also known as ‘Oţeysh) is a village in Soveyseh Rural District, in the Soveyseh District of Karun County, Khuzestan Province, Iran. At the 2006 census, its population was 417, in 68 families.
