= Esmailiyeh-ye Do =

Esmailiyeh-ye Do اسماعيليه دو
- Village
- Location within Iran
- Coordinates: 31°02′10″N 48°24′41″E
- Country: Iran
- Province: Khuzestan
- County: Karun
- Bakhsh: Soveyseh
- Rural District: Muran

Population (2006)
  - Total: 615
- Time zone: UTC+3:30 (IRST)
  - Summer (DST): UTC+4:30 (IRDT)

Esmailiyeh-ye Do (Persian: اسماعيليه دو, also Romanized as Esmā‘īlīyeh-ye Do; also known as Esmā ‘Eynī, Esmā‘īlīyeh, and Ismaun) is a village in Muran Rural District, in the Soveyseh District of Karun County, Khuzestan Province, Iran. At the 2006 census, its population was 615, in 130 families.
