= Esmailiyeh-ye Yek =

Esmailiyeh-ye Yek اسماعيليه يك
- Village
- Location within Iran
- Coordinates: 31°01′45″N 48°24′27″E
- Country: Iran
- Province: Khuzestan
- County: Karun
- Bakhsh: Soveyseh
- Rural District: Muran

Population (2006)
  - Total: 603
- Time zone: UTC+3:30 (IRST)
  - Summer (DST): UTC+4:30 (IRDT)

Esmailiyeh-ye Yek (Persian: اسماعيليه يك, also Romanized as Esmā‘īlīyeh-ye Yek) is a village in Muran Rural District, in the Soveyseh District of Karun County, Khuzestan Province, Iran. At the 2006 census, its population was 603, in 122 families.
