= Sakui Kulesah =

Sakui Kulesah سكوي كولسه
- Village
- Location within Iran
- Coordinates: 33°53′52″N 46°39′04″E
- Country: Iran
- Province: Kermanshah
- County: Eslamabad-e Gharb
- Bakhsh: Central
- Rural District: Howmeh-ye Jonubi

Population (2006)
  - Total: 56
- Time zone: UTC+3:30 (IRST)
  - Summer (DST): UTC+4:30 (IRDT)

Sakui Kulesah (Persian: سكوي كولسه, also Romanized as Sakūī Kūlesah; also known as Sakūkolesah) is a village in Howmeh-ye Jonubi Rural District, in the Central District of Eslamabad-e Gharb County, Kermanshah Province, Iran. At the 2006 census, its population was 56, in 17 families.
