= Mobaraki, Iran =

Mobaraki (Persian: مباركي) may refer to:

- Mobaraki 2, village in Khuzestan, Iran
- Mobaraki 3, village in Khuzestan, Iran
- Mobaraki, a Baloch tribe of Iran
