= Soveyseh-ye Seh =

Soveyseh-ye Seh سويسه سه
- Village
- Location within Iran
- Coordinates: 31°07′45″N 48°36′18″E
- Country: Iran
- Province: Khuzestan
- County: Karun
- Bakhsh: Soveyseh
- Rural District: Soveyseh

Population (2006)
  - Total: 1,413
- Time zone: UTC+3:30 (IRST)
  - Summer (DST): UTC+4:30 (IRDT)

Soveyseh-ye Seh (Persian: سويسه سه) is a village in Soveyseh Rural District, in the Soveyseh District of Karun County, Khuzestan Province, Iran. At the 2006 census, its population was 1,413, in 214 families.
