= Cheshmeh Velgah =

Cheshmeh Velgah چشمه ولگه
- Village
- Location within Iran
- Coordinates: 33°55′15″N 46°39′56″E
- Country: Iran
- Province: Kermanshah
- County: Eslamabad-e Gharb
- Bakhsh: Central
- Rural District: Howmeh-ye Jonubi

Population (2006)
  - Total: 86
- Time zone: UTC+3:30 (IRST)
  - Summer (DST): UTC+4:30 (IRDT)

Cheshmeh Velgah (Persian: چشمه ولگه, also Romanized as Cheshmeh Velgeh and Cheshmeh-ye Velagah) is a village in Howmeh-ye Jonubi Rural District, in the Central District of Eslamabad-e Gharb County, Kermanshah Province, Iran. At the 2006 census, its population was 86, in 19 families.
