= Darkhor =

Darkhor (Persian: دارخور) may refer to:

- Darkhor-e Aqa Reza
- Darkhor-e Hasanabad
