= Karim Haseleh =

Karim Haseleh (Persian: كريم حاصله) may refer to:

- Karim Haseleh-ye Olya
- Karim Haseleh-ye Sofla
