= Mobaraki-ye Seh =

Mobaraki-ye Seh مباركي سه
- Village
- Location within Iran
- Coordinates: 31°01′34″N 48°33′30″E
- Country: Iran
- Province: Khuzestan
- County: Karun
- Bakhsh: Soveyseh
- Rural District: Soveyseh

Population (2006)
  - Total: 147
- Time zone: UTC+3:30 (IRST)
  - Summer (DST): UTC+4:30 (IRDT)

Mobaraki-ye Seh (Persian: مباركي سه, also Romanized as Mobārakī-ye Seh and Mobārakī Seh; also known as Mobārakeh-ye Seh, Mobārakī, and Mobārakī-yeh Seh) is a village in Soveyseh Rural District, in the Soveyseh District of Karun County, Khuzestan Province, Iran. At the 2006 census, its population was 147, in 33 families.
