= Pirgeh Bar-e Simin =

Pirgeh Bar-e Simin پيرگه برسيمين
- Village
- Location within Iran
- Coordinates: 34°02′56″N 46°35′25″E
- Country: Iran
- Province: Kermanshah
- County: Eslamabad-e Gharb
- Bakhsh: Central
- Rural District: Howmeh-ye Jonubi

Population (2006)
  - Total: 276
- Time zone: UTC+3:30 (IRST)
  - Summer (DST): UTC+4:30 (IRDT)

Pirgeh Bar-e Simin (Persian: پيرگه برسيمين, also Romanized as Pīrgeh Bar-e Sīmīn; also known as Pīrgeh-ye Bareh Sīmīn) is a village in Howmeh-ye Jonubi Rural District, in the Central District of Eslamabad-e Gharb County, Kermanshah Province, Iran. At the 2006 census, its population was 276, in 66 families.
