= Atash =

Atash may refer to:

- The New Persian word for Atar, the Zoroastrian concept of holy fire
- Atash Behram, the highest grade of a fire that can be placed in a fire temple
- Atash, Iran, a village in Khuzestan Province, Iran
- Atash (newspaper), a defunct newspaper in Iran
- Mohammed Nadir Atash, Afghan-American educator

== See also ==
- Sang-e Atash (disambiguation)
