= Farsiat-e Bozorg =

Farsiat-e Bozorg فارسيات بزرگ
- Village
- Location within Iran
- Coordinates: 31°07′47″N 48°25′07″E
- Country: Iran
- Province: Khuzestan
- County: Karun
- Bakhsh: Soveyseh
- Rural District: Muran

Population (2006)
  - Total: 458
- Time zone: UTC+3:30 (IRST)
  - Summer (DST): UTC+4:30 (IRDT)

Farsiat-e Bozorg (Persian: فارسيات بزرگ, also Romanized as Fārsīāt-e Bozorg) is a village in Muran Rural District, in the Soveyseh District of Karun County, Khuzestan Province, Iran. At the 2006 census, its population was 458, in 95 families.
