= Farsiat-e Kuchek =

Farsiat-e Kuchek فارسيات كوچك
- Village
- Location within Iran
- Coordinates: 31°07′19″N 48°24′02″E
- Country: Iran
- Province: Khuzestan
- County: Karun
- Bakhsh: Soveyseh
- Rural District: Muran

Population (2006)
  - Total: 261
- Time zone: UTC+3:30 (IRST)
  - Summer (DST): UTC+4:30 (IRDT)

Farsiat-e Kuchek (Persian: فارسيات كوچك, also Romanized as Fārsīāt-e Kūchek, Farsīāt-e Kūchak, and Fārseyāt-e Kūchek; also known as Fārsīāt and Farsiyat) is a village in Muran Rural District, in the Soveyseh District of Karun County, Khuzestan Province, Iran. At the 2006 census, its population was 261, in 59 families.
