= Soveyseh-ye Sadat =

Soveyseh-ye Sadat سويسه سادات
- Village
- Location within Iran
- Coordinates: 31°08′10″N 48°36′38″E
- Country: Iran
- Province: Khuzestan
- County: Karun
- Bakhsh: Soveyseh
- Rural District: Soveyseh

Population (2006)
  - Total: 503
- Time zone: UTC+3:30 (IRST)
  - Summer (DST): UTC+4:30 (IRDT)

Soveyseh-ye Sadat (Persian: سويسه سادات, also Romanized as Soveyseh-ye Sādāt; also known as Soveyseh-ye Yek) is a village in Soveyseh Rural District, in the Soveyseh District of Karun County, Khuzestan Province, Iran. At the 2006 census, its population was 503, in 76 families.
