= Tavil (disambiguation) =

A tavil or thavil is a barrel-shaped percussion instrument from Tamil Nadu.

Tavil may also refer to:

- Tavil, East Azerbaijan, Iran
- Tavil, Khuzestan, Iran
- Tavil, Chenaran, Razavi Khorasan Province, Iran
- Tavil, Quchan, Razavi Khorasan Province, Iran

== See also ==
- Tawil (disambiguation)
