= Ghazaviyeh =

Ghazaviyeh or Ghazzawiyeh or Qazaviyeh (Persian: غزاويه) may refer to:

- Ghazaviyeh-ye Bozorg
- Ghazaviyeh-ye Kuchek
