= Ghazaviyeh-ye Kuchek =

Ghazaviyeh-ye Kuchek غزاويه كوچك
- Village
- Location within Iran
- Coordinates: 31°12′10″N 48°34′10″E
- Country: Iran
- Province: Khuzestan
- County: Karun
- Bakhsh: Central
- Rural District: Kut-e Abdollah

Population (2006)
  - Total: 789
- Time zone: UTC+3:30 (IRST)
  - Summer (DST): UTC+4:30 (IRDT)

Ghazaviyeh-ye Kuchek (Persian: غزاويه كوچك, also Romanized as Ghazāvīyeh-ye Kūchek, Ghazāvīyeh-ye Kuchak; also known as Ghazāvīyeh-ye Do, Ghazzawiyeh, Qal‘eh-ye Ghazāvīyeh, and Qazāvīyeh Kūchak) is a village in Kut-e Abdollah Rural District, in the Central District of Karun County, Khuzestan Province, Iran. At the 2006 census, its population was 789, in 148 families.
