= Farrokh Khani =

Farrokh Khani فرح خاني
- Village
- Location within Iran
- Coordinates: 34°07′38″N 46°41′56″E
- Country: Iran
- Province: Kermanshah
- County: Eslamabad-e Gharb
- Bakhsh: Central
- Rural District: Hasanabad

Population (2006)
  - Total: 230
- Time zone: UTC+3:30 (IRST)
  - Summer (DST): UTC+4:30 (IRDT)

Farrokh Khani (Persian: فرح خاني, also Romanized as Farrokh Khānī; also known as Deh Farokh Khān) is a village in Hasanabad Rural District, in the Central District of Eslamabad-e Gharb County, Kermanshah Province, Iran. At the 2006 census, its population was 230, in 46 families.
