= Jowzeh =

Jowzeh or Juzeh (Persian: جوزه) may refer to:

- Juzeh, Kermanshah
- Jowzeh-ye Anjirak, Kermanshah Province
- Jowzeh, Qom
