= Sang-e Atash =

Sang-e Atash or Sang Atash or Sang Atesh (Persian: سنگ اتش) may refer to:

== Iran ==
- Sang-e Atash, Fariman, Razavi Khorasan Province
- Sang-e Atash, Mashhad, Razavi Khorasan Province
- Sang-e Atash, Torbat-e Jam, Razavi Khorasan Province

== Elsewhere ==
- Sang Atesh, Ab Kamari, Ab Kamari District, Badghis Province, Afghanistan

== See also ==
- Atash (disambiguation)
