= Cheqa Jangeh =

Cheqa Jangeh or Cheqa Jengah (Persian: چقاجنگه), also rendered as Chaqa Janga, Chegha Changa, Cheqa Jenga, Chega Janga, Chega Jangeh, or Cheqa Jengay, may refer to:

- Cheqa Jangeh-ye Olya
- Cheqa Jangeh-ye Sofla
