= Jongiyeh =

Neighborhood in Khuzestan province, Iran

Jongiyeh Persian: جنگيه
- Neighborhood
- Location within Iran
- Coordinates: 31°14′21″N 48°37′14″E
- Country: Iran
- Province: Khuzestan
- County: Karun
- District: Central
- City: Rabi

Population (2016)
  - Total: 4,644
- Time zone: UTC+3:30 (IRST)

Jongiyeh (Persian: جنگيه) (Note: Also romanized as Jangeyeh, Jangīyeh, and Jongīyeh) is a neighborhood in the city of Rabi of the Central District of Karun County, Khuzestan province, Iran.

== Demographics ==
=== Population ===
At the time of the 2006 National Census, the village's population was 4,183 in 666 households, when it was in Kut-e Abdollah Rural District of the Central District of Ahvaz County. The following census in 2011 counted 4,396 people in 1,106 households, The 2016 census measured the population of the village as 4,644 people in 1,284 households, by which time the rural district had been separated from the county in the establishment of Karun County and was transferred to the new Central District. It was the most populous village in its rural district.

In 2017, the villages of Abu Dabis, Amireh, Jongiyeh, and Kuy-e Vali Aser were merged to form the new city of Rabi.
