= Farsiat =

Farsiat or Farsiyat or Farseyat (Persian: فارسيات) may refer to:

- Farsiat-e Bozorg
- Farsiat-e Kuchek
