= Tajjar Karam-e Panahabad =

Tajjar Karam-e Panahabad تجركرم پناه اباد
- Village
- Location within Iran
- Coordinates: 34°06′51″N 46°37′15″E
- Country: Iran
- Province: Kermanshah
- County: Eslamabad-e Gharb
- Bakhsh: Central
- Rural District: Shiyan

Population (2006)
  - Total: 382
- Time zone: UTC+3:30 (IRST)
  - Summer (DST): UTC+4:30 (IRDT)

Tajjar Karam-e Panahabad (Persian: تجركرم پناه اباد, also Romanized as Tajjar Karam-e Panāhābād; also known as Karam-e Panāhābād) is a village in Shiyan Rural District, in the Central District of Eslamabad-e Gharb County, Kermanshah Province, Iran. At the 2006 census, its population was 382, in 86 families.
