= Tavil, Khuzestan =

Tavil طويل
- Village
- Location within Iran
- Coordinates: 31°02′15″N 48°43′22″E
- Country: Iran
- Province: Khuzestan
- County: Karun
- Bakhsh: Soveyseh
- Rural District: Soveyseh

Population (2006)
  - Total: 125
- Time zone: UTC+3:30 (IRST)
  - Summer (DST): UTC+4:30 (IRDT)

Tavil (Persian: طويل, also Romanized as Ţavīl, Tāvīl, Tāwil, Ţovayel, and Ţoveyyel) is a village in Soveyseh Rural District, in the Soveyseh District of Karun County, Khuzestan Province, Iran. At the 2006 census, its population was 125, in 20 families.
