= Tang-e Shuhan =

Tang-e Shuhan or Tang-e Showhan (Persian: تنگ شوهان), also known as Tang-i-Shuwan, may refer to:

- Tang-e Shuhan-e Olya
- Tang-e Shuhan-e Sofla
