= Esmailiyeh =

Esmailiyeh (Persian: اسماعيليه) may refer to:

- Esmailiyeh-ye Olya, Kerman Province
- Esmailiyeh-ye Sofla, Kerman Province
- Esmailiyeh 1, Khuzestan Province
- Esmailiyeh 2, Khuzestan Province
- Esmailiyeh Rural District, in Khuzestan Province

== See also ==
- Isma'iliyya (disambiguation)
