= Baricheh, Karun =

Baricheh بريچه
- Village
- Location within Iran
- Coordinates: 31°09′03″N 48°28′01″E
- Country: Iran
- Province: Khuzestan
- County: Karun
- Bakhsh: Soveyseh
- Rural District: Muran

Population (2006)
  - Total: 270
- Time zone: UTC+3:30 (IRST)
  - Summer (DST): UTC+4:30 (IRDT)

Baricheh (Persian: بريچه, also Romanized as Barīcheh, Bereycheh, and Berīcheh; also known as Barīsheh and Berijeh) is a village in Muran Rural District, in the Soveyseh District of Karun County, Khuzestan Province, Iran. At the 2006 census, its population was 270, in 60 families.
