= Bahar, Khuzestan =

Village in Khuzestan province, Iran

Bahar Persian: بهر
- Village
- Location within Iran
- Coordinates: 31°10′46″N 48°32′54″E
- Country: Iran
- Province: Khuzestan
- County: Karun
- District: Soveyseh
- Rural District: Muran

Population (2016)
  - Total: 2,416
- Time zone: UTC+3:30 (IRST)

Bahar (Persian: بهر) (Note: Also romanized as Baḩar) is a village in, and the capital of, Muran Rural District of Soveyseh District, Karun County, Khuzestan province, Iran. It was the capital of Kut-e Abdollah Rural District until its capital was transferred to the village of Mozaffariyeh.

== Demographics ==
=== Population ===
At the time of the 2006 National Census, the village's population was 2,011 in 362 households, when it was in Kut-e Abdollah Rural District of the Central District of Ahvaz County. The following census in 2011 counted 2,363 people in 526 households. The 2016 census measured the population of the village as 2,416 people in 623 households, by which time the rural district had been separated from the county in the establishment of Karun County. The rural district transferred to the new Central District, and Bahar was transferred to Muran Rural District created in the new Soveyseh District. It was the most populous village in its rural district.
