= Tajjar Akbar =

Tajjar Akbar تجراكبر
- Village
- Location within Iran
- Coordinates: 34°02′21″N 46°36′44″E
- Country: Iran
- Province: Kermanshah
- County: Eslamabad-e Gharb
- Bakhsh: Central
- Rural District: Howmeh-ye Jonubi

Population (2006)
  - Total: 596
- Time zone: UTC+3:30 (IRST)
  - Summer (DST): UTC+4:30 (IRDT)

Tajjar Akbar (Persian: تجراكبر; also known as Mūsh Kosh and Tajjar Akbar-e Mūsh Kosh) is a village in Howmeh-ye Jonubi Rural District, in the Central District of Eslamabad-e Gharb County, Kermanshah Province, Iran. At the 2006 census, its population was 596, in 136 families.
