= Damgheh =

Damgheh (Persian: دامغه) may refer to:

- Damgheh-ye Bozorg
- Damgheh-ye Kuchek
