= Jaf =

Jaf or JAF may refer to:

- Jaf, Iran, a village in Kermanshah Province, Iran
- JAF (cartoonist), cartoonist for The Village Voice
- JAF (musician), Argentine musician
- Jaff (Kurdish tribe)
- Jaish al-Fatah, a Syrian militant coalition in the Syrian Civil War
- Jalalabad Airfield, Afghanistan
- James A. Fitzpatrick Nuclear Generating Station
- James Alex Fields
- Japan Air Self-Defense Force
- Japan Automobile Federation, a member of the FIA
- Japanese Anarchist Federation, an anarchist organisation active in Japan from 1946 to 1968
- JavaBeans Activation Framework
- Jetairfly, a Belgian airline
- Jordanian Armed Forces
- Kankesanturai Airport near Jaffna, Sri Lanka
