= Now Shakaleh-ye Tarazu =

Now Shakaleh-ye Tarazu نوشكله ترازو
- Village
- Country: Iran
- Province: Kermanshah
- County: Eslamabad-e Gharb
- Bakhsh: Central
- Rural District: Howmeh-ye Jonubi

Population (2006)
  - Total: 123
- Time zone: UTC+3:30 (IRST)
  - Summer (DST): UTC+4:30 (IRDT)

Now Shakaleh-ye Tarazu (Persian: نوشكله ترازو, also Romanized as Now Shakaleh-ye Tarāzū) is a village in Howmeh-ye Jonubi Rural District, in the Central District of Eslamabad-e Gharb County, Kermanshah Province, Iran. At the 2006 census, its population was 123, in 24 families.
