= Shahid Abdol Karim-e Maleki =

Shahid Abdol Karim-e Maleki شهيدعبدالكريم ملكي
- Village
- Location within Iran
- Coordinates: 34°08′31″N 46°40′47″E
- Country: Iran
- Province: Kermanshah
- County: Eslamabad-e Gharb
- Bakhsh: Central
- Rural District: Hasanabad

Population (2006)
  - Total: 575
- Time zone: UTC+3:30 (IRST)
  - Summer (DST): UTC+4:30 (IRDT)

Shahid Abdol Karim-e Maleki (Persian: شهيدعبدالكريم ملكي, also Romanized as Shahīd ʿAbdol Karīm-e Malekī and Shahīdabdolkarīm-e Malekī) is a village in Hasanabad Rural District, in the Central District of Eslamabad-e Gharb County, Kermanshah Province, Iran. At the 2006 census, its population was 575, in 137 families.
