= Soveyseh-ye Saleh =

Soveyseh-ye Saleh سويسه صالح
- Village
- Location within Iran
- Coordinates: 31°08′34″N 48°36′24″E
- Country: Iran
- Province: Khuzestan
- County: Karun
- Bakhsh: Soveyseh
- Rural District: Soveyseh

Population (2006)
  - Total: 781
- Time zone: UTC+3:30 (IRST)
  - Summer (DST): UTC+4:30 (IRDT)

Soveyseh-ye Saleh (Persian: سويسه صالح, also Romanized as Soveyseh-ye Şāleḩ; also known as Savaiseh, Soveyseh, and Soveyseh-ye Chahār) is a village in Soveyseh Rural District, in the Soveyseh District of Karun County, Khuzestan Province, Iran. At the 2006 census, its population was 781, in 132 families.
