= Lorini-ye Ajudani =

Lorini-ye Ajudani لريني اجوداني
- Village
- Location within Iran
- Coordinates: 34°09′14″N 46°34′59″E
- Country: Iran
- Province: Kermanshah
- County: Eslamabad-e Gharb
- Bakhsh: Central
- Rural District: Hasanabad

Population (2006)
  - Total: 330
- Time zone: UTC+3:30 (IRST)
  - Summer (DST): UTC+4:30 (IRDT)

Lorini-ye Ajudani (Persian: لريني اجوداني, also Romanized as Lorīnī-ye Ājūdānī; also known as Lorīnī) is a village in Hasanabad Rural District, in the Central District of Eslamabad-e Gharb County, Kermanshah Province, Iran. At the 2006 census, its population was 330, in 70 families.
