= Mohammad Alikhani =

Mohammad Alikhani محمدعلي خاني
- Village
- Location within Iran
- Coordinates: 34°07′13″N 46°42′48″E
- Country: Iran
- Province: Kermanshah
- County: Eslamabad-e Gharb
- Bakhsh: Central
- Rural District: Hasanabad

Population (2006)
  - Total: 344
- Time zone: UTC+3:30 (IRST)
  - Summer (DST): UTC+4:30 (IRDT)

Mohammad Alikhani (Persian: محمدعلي خاني, also Romanized as Moḩammad ‘Alīkhānī; also known as Chaleh-ye Moḩammad ‘Alī Khānī and Moḩammad ‘Alīkhān) is a village in Hasanabad Rural District, in the Central District of Eslamabad-e Gharb County, Kermanshah Province, Iran. At the 2006 census, its population was 344, in 65 families.
