= Siah Khvor =

Siah Khvor سياه خور
- Village
- Location within Iran
- Coordinates: 34°07′37″N 46°35′54″E
- Country: Iran
- Province: Kermanshah
- County: Eslamabad-e Gharb
- Bakhsh: Central
- Rural District: Hasanabad

Population (2006)
  - Total: 486
- Time zone: UTC+3:30 (IRST)
  - Summer (DST): UTC+4:30 (IRDT)

Siah Khvor (Persian: سياه خور, also Romanized as Sīāh Khvor, Seyāh Khowr, and Siah Khwār; also known as Sīāh Khor, Sīāh Khūz, and Suvār Khār) is a village in Hasanabad Rural District, in the Central District of Eslamabad-e Gharb County, Kermanshah Province, Iran. At the 2006 census, its population was 486, in 106 families.
