= Barfabad =

Barfabad (Persian: برف اباد) may refer to:

- Barfabad-e Olya
- Barfabad-e Sofla

The origin of the snack "barfi".
