= Azab =

Azab may refer to:

- Anedjib, a pharaoh of the First Dynasty of Egypt
- Āzāb or Azaw, Afghanistan
- Azab, Khuzestan, Iran
- Azab, West Azerbaijan, Iran
- Azap or Azab, irregular light infantry of the Ottoman Army
