= Mobaraki-ye Do =

Mobaraki-ye Do مباركي دو
- Village
- Location within Iran
- Coordinates: 31°03′39″N 48°34′33″E
- Country: Iran
- Province: Khuzestan
- County: Karun
- Bakhsh: Soveyseh
- Rural District: Soveyseh

Population (2006)
  - Total: 329
- Time zone: UTC+3:30 (IRST)
  - Summer (DST): UTC+4:30 (IRDT)

Mobaraki-ye Do (Persian: مباركي دو, also Romanized as Mobārakī-ye Do and Mobārakī Do; also known as ‘Abbās, ‘Arab ‘Abbās, Mobārakeh-ye Do, and Mobārakī) is a village in Soveyseh Rural District, in the Soveyseh District of Karun County, Khuzestan Province, Iran. At the 2006 census, its population was 329, in 62 families.
