= Choqa Gol =

Choqa Gol چقاگل
- Village
- Location within Iran
- Coordinates: 34°03′14″N 46°34′13″E
- Country: Iran
- Province: Kermanshah
- County: Eslamabad-e Gharb
- Bakhsh: Central
- Rural District: Howmeh-ye Jonubi

Population (2006)
  - Total: 494
- Time zone: UTC+3:30 (IRST)
  - Summer (DST): UTC+4:30 (IRDT)

Choqa Gol (Persian: چقاگل, also Romanized as Choqā Gol) is a village in Howmeh-ye Jonubi Rural District, in the Central District of Eslamabad-e Gharb County, Kermanshah Province, Iran. At the 2006 census, its population was 494, in 117 families.
