= Tarazak =

Tarazak (Persian: ترازك) may refer to:

- Tarazak-e Abdollah
- Tarazak-e Kasan
