= Zavareh Kuh =

Zavareh Kuh زواره كوه
- Village
- Location within Iran
- Coordinates: 34°01′56″N 46°29′51″E
- Country: Iran
- Province: Kermanshah
- County: Eslamabad-e Gharb
- Bakhsh: Central
- Rural District: Howmeh-ye Jonubi

Population (2006)
  - Total: 106
- Time zone: UTC+3:30 (IRST)
  - Summer (DST): UTC+4:30 (IRDT)

Zavareh Kuh (Persian: زواره كوه, also Romanized as Zavāreh Kūh) is a village in Howmeh-ye Jonubi Rural District, in the Central District of Eslamabad-e Gharb County, Kermanshah Province, Iran. At the 2006 census, its population was 106, in 26 families.
