= Ghazaviyeh-ye Bozorg =

Ghazaviyeh-ye Bozorg غزاويه بزرگ
- Village
- Location within Iran
- Coordinates: 31°11′47″N 48°33′17″E
- Country: Iran
- Province: Khuzestan
- County: Karun
- Bakhsh: Soveyseh
- Rural District: Muran

Population (2006)
  - Total: 1,175
- Time zone: UTC+3:30 (IRST)
  - Summer (DST): UTC+4:30 (IRDT)

Ghazaviyeh-ye Bozorg (Persian: غزاويه بزرگ, also Romanized as Ghazāvīyeh-ye Bozorg and Ghazaviyehe Bozorg; also known as Ghazāvīyeh-ye Seh and Qal‘eh) is a village in Muran Rural District, in the Soveyseh District of Karun County, Khuzestan Province, Iran. At the 2006 census, its population was 1,175, in 217 families.
