= Eslamabad, Karun =

Village in Khuzestan province, Iran

Eslamabad Persian: اسلام اباد
- Village
- Location within Iran
- Coordinates: 31°10′32″N 48°37′40″E
- Country: Iran
- Province: Khuzestan
- County: Karun
- District: Soveyseh
- Rural District: Soveyseh

Population (2016)
  - Total: 2,024
- Time zone: UTC+3:30 (IRST)

Eslamabad (Persian: اسلام اباد) (Note: Also romanized as Eslāmābād) is a village in Soveyseh Rural District of Soveyseh District, Karun County, Khuzestan province, Iran.

== Demographics ==
=== Population ===
At the time of the 2006 National Census, the village's population was 1,393 in 296 households, when it was in the Central District of Ahvaz County. The following census in 2011 counted 1,521 people in 333 households. The 2016 census measured the population of the village as 2,024 people in 508 households, by which time the rural district had been separated from the county in the establishment of Karun County and transferred to the new Soveyseh District. It was the most populous village in its rural district.
