= Kamareh-ye Sofla =

Kamareh-ye Sofla كمره سفلي
- Village
- Location within Iran
- Coordinates: 34°02′27″N 46°47′09″E
- Country: Iran
- Province: lorestan
- County: Eslamabad-e Gharb
- Bakhsh: Central
- Rural District: Shiyan

Population (2006)
  - Total: 584
- Time zone: UTC+3:30 (IRST)
  - Summer (DST): UTC+4:30 (IRDT)

Kamareh-ye Sofla (Persian: كمره سفلي, also Romanized as Kamareh-ye Soflá; also known as Kamārah) is a village in Shiyan Rural District, in the Central District of Eslamabad-e Gharb County, lorestan Province, Iran. At the 2006 census, its population was 584, in 122 families.
