= Tarazak-e Kasan =

Tarazak-e Kasan ترازك كسان
- Village
- Location within Iran
- Coordinates: 33°59′56″N 46°30′04″E
- Country: Iran
- Province: Kermanshah
- County: Eslamabad-e Gharb
- Bakhsh: Central
- Rural District: Howmeh-ye Jonubi

Population (2006)
  - Total: 269
- Time zone: UTC+3:30 (IRST)
  - Summer (DST): UTC+4:30 (IRDT)

Tarazak-e Kasan (Persian: ترازك كسان, also Romanized as Tarāzak-e Kasān) is a village in Howmeh-ye Jonubi Rural District, in the Central District of Eslamabad-e Gharb County, Kermanshah Province, Iran. At the 2006 census, its population was 269, in 52 families.
