= Tang-e Shuhan-e Sofla =

Tang-e Shuhan-e Sofla تنگ شوهان سفلي
- Village
- Location within Iran
- Coordinates: 34°10′29″N 46°43′32″E
- Country: Iran
- Province: Kermanshah
- County: Eslamabad-e Gharb
- Bakhsh: Central
- Rural District: Hasanabad

Population (2006)
  - Total: 482
- Time zone: UTC+3:30 (IRST)
  - Summer (DST): UTC+4:30 (IRDT)

Tang-e Shuhan-e Sofla (Persian: تنگ شوهان سفلي, also Romanized as Tang-e Shūhān-e Soflá) is a village in Hasanabad Rural District, in the Central District of Eslamabad-e Gharb County, Kermanshah Province, Iran. At the 2006 census, its population was 482, in 106 families.
