= Abu Nageh =

Village in Khuzestan province, Iran

Abu Nageh Persian: ابوناگه
- Village
- Location within Iran
- Coordinates: 31°08′32″N 48°36′59″E
- Country: Iran
- Province: Khuzestan
- County: Karun
- District: Soveyseh
- Rural District: Soveyseh

Population (2016)
  - Total: 1,450
- Time zone: UTC+3:30 (IRST)

Abu Nageh (Persian: ابوناگه) (Note: Also romanized as Aboo Nageh, Abū Nāgah, and Abū Nāgeh) is a village in Soveyseh Rural District of Soveyseh District, Karun County, Khuzestan province, Iran, serving as capital of both the district and the rural district.

== Demographics ==
=== Population ===
At the time of the 2006 National Census, the village's population was 850 in 168 households, when it was in the Central District of Ahvaz County. The following census in 2011 counted 624 people in 157 households. The 2016 census measured the population of the village as 1,450 people in 399 households, by which time the rural district had been separated from the county in the establishment of Karun County and transferred to the new Soveyseh District.
