= Tang-e Shuhan-e Olya =

Tang-e Shuhan-e Olya تنگ شوهان عليا
- Village
- Location within Iran
- Coordinates: 34°10′27″N 46°43′53″E
- Country: Iran
- Province: Kermanshah
- County: Eslamabad-e Gharb
- Bakhsh: Central
- Rural District: Hasanabad

Population (2006)
  - Total: 527
- Time zone: UTC+3:30 (IRST)
  - Summer (DST): UTC+4:30 (IRDT)

Tang-e Shuhan-e Olya (Persian: تنگ شوهان عليا, also Romanized as Tang-e Shūhān-e ‘Olyā and Tang-e Showhān-e ‘Olyā; also known as Tang-e Shīān, Tang-e Shūhān, Tang-e Shūhān-e Bālā, and Tang-i-Shuwan) is a village in Hasanabad Rural District, in the Central District of Eslamabad-e Gharb County, Kermanshah Province, Iran. At the 2006 census, its population was 527, in 125 families.
