= Tawil (disambiguation) =

Tawil (Arabic: طويل, 'long') is a meter used in classical Arabic poetry.

Tawil may also refer to:

== People ==
- Adel Tawil (born 1978), German singer, songwriter and producer
- Emmanuel Tawil, French academic and lawyer
- Hanan El Tawil (1966–2004), Egyptian actress and singer
- Helga Tawil-Souri (born 1969), Palestinian–American writer and documentary filmmaker
- Issam Haitham Taweel (born 1989), Egyptian tennis player
- Joseph Tawil (1913–1999), Melkite Greek Catholic archbishop
- Macarius IV Tawil (died 1815), Melkite Greek Catholic patriarch
- Raymonda Tawil (born 1940), Palestinian writer and journalist
- Rosarita Tawil (born 1988), Lebanese model
- Suha Arafat (born 1963), widow of former Palestinian Authority President Yasser Arafat
- Wissam al-Tawil (1970–2024), Lebanese militant and commander

== Other uses ==
- Esoteric interpretation of the Quran (Arabic: تأويل, taʾwīl)

== See also ==
- Tavil (disambiguation)
