= Jaf Bar-e Simin =

Jaf جاف برسيمين
- Village
- Location within Iran
- Coordinates: 34°00′21″N 46°34′23″E
- Country: Iran
- Province: Kermanshah
- County: Eslamabad-e Gharb
- Bakhsh: Central
- Rural District: Howmeh-ye Jonubi

Population (2006)
  - Total: 86
- Time zone: UTC+3:30 (IRST)
  - Summer (DST): UTC+4:30 (IRDT)

Jaf Bar-e Simin (Persian: جاف برسيمين, also Romanized as Jāf Bar-e Sīmīn, Jāfbar-e Sīmīn, and Jāf Barsīmīn; also known as Jāf, Jafail, Jāf Bareh Samīn-e ‘Olyā, and Jāfbareh-ye Sīmīn) is a village in Howmeh-ye Jonubi Rural District, in the Central District of Eslamabad-e Gharb County, Kermanshah Province, Iran. At the 2006 census, its population was 85, in 17 families.
