= Azab, Khuzestan =

Azab اعضب
- Village
- Location within Iran
- Coordinates: 31°06′45″N 48°43′27″E
- Country: Iran
- Province: Khuzestan
- County: Karun
- Bakhsh: Central
- Rural District: Qaleh Chenan

Population (2006)
  - Total: 32
- Time zone: UTC+3:30 (IRST)
  - Summer (DST): UTC+4:30 (IRDT)

Azab (Persian: اعضب, also Romanized as A‘ẕab; also known as Azibi and O‘īz̄eb) is a village in Qaleh Chenan Rural District, in the Central District of Karun County, Khuzestan Province, Iran. At the 2006 census, its population was 32, in 4 families.
