= Kamareh-ye Gharbi =

Kamareh-ye Gharbi كمره غربي
- Village
- Location within Iran
- Coordinates: 34°02′27″N 46°45′49″E
- Country: Iran
- Province: Kermanshah
- County: Eslamabad-e Gharb
- Bakhsh: Central
- Rural District: Shiyan

Population (2006)
  - Total: 220
- Time zone: UTC+3:30 (IRST)
  - Summer (DST): UTC+4:30 (IRDT)

Kamareh-ye Gharbi (Persian: كمره غربي, also Romanized as Kamareh-ye Gharbī; also known as Kamārah and Kamareh) is a village in Shiyan Rural District, in the Central District of Eslamabad-e Gharb County, Kermanshah Province, Iran. At the 2006 census, its population was 220, in 47 families.
