= Hasanabad, Eslamabad-e Gharb =

Village in Kermanshah province, Iran

Hasanabad Persian: حسن اباد
- Village
- Location within Iran
- Coordinates: 34°09′53″N 46°39′32″E
- Country: Iran
- Province: Kermanshah
- County: Eslamabad-e Gharb
- District: Central
- Rural District: Hasanabad

Population (2016)
  - Total: 913
- Time zone: UTC+3:30 (IRST)

Hasanabad (Persian: حسن اباد) (Note: Also romanized as Ḩasanābād; also known as Ḩasanābād-e Zobeyrī, Zībīrī, Zībrī, Zībrī Hasan Abad, Zobeyrī, and Zobeyrī Ḩasanābād) is a village in, and the capital of, Hasanabad Rural District of the Central District of Eslamabad-e Gharb County, Kermanshah province, Iran.

== Demographics ==
=== Population ===
At the time of the 2006 National Census, the village's population was 1,145 in 270 households. The following census in 2011 counted 1,169 people in 321 households. The 2016 census measured the population of the village as 913 people in 276 households. It was the most populous village in its rural district.
