= Karim Haseleh-ye Olya =

Karim Haseleh-ye Olya كريم حاصله عليا
- Village
- Location within Iran
- Coordinates: 34°08′20″N 46°37′43″E
- Country: Iran
- Province: Kermanshah
- County: Eslamabad-e Gharb
- Bakhsh: Central
- Rural District: Hasanabad

Population (2006)
  - Total: 22
- Time zone: UTC+3:30 (IRST)
  - Summer (DST): UTC+4:30 (IRDT)

Karim Haseleh-ye Olya (Persian: كريم حاصله عليا, also Romanized as Karīm Ḩāşeleh-ye ‘Olyā) is a village in Hasanabad Rural District, in the Central District of Eslamabad-e Gharb County, Kermanshah Province, Iran. At the 2006 census, its population was 22, in 6 families.
