= Damgheh-ye Bozorg =

Village in Khuzestan province, Iran

Damgheh-ye Bozorg Persian: دامغه بزرگ
- Village
- Location within Iran
- Coordinates: 31°15′03″N 48°46′57″E
- Country: Iran
- Province: Khuzestan
- County: Karun
- District: Soveyseh
- Rural District: Soveyseh

Population (2016)
  - Total: 405
- Time zone: UTC+3:30 (IRST)

Damgheh-ye Bozorg (Persian: دامغه بزرگ) (Note: Also romanized as Dāmgheh-ye Bozorg and Damghehe’ Bozorg) is a village in Soveyseh Rural District of Soveyseh District, Karun County, Khuzestan province, Iran.

== Demographics ==
=== Population ===
At the time of the 2006 National Census, the village's population was 409 in 89 households, when it was in Mosharrahat Rural District of the Central District of Ahvaz County. The following census in 2011 counted 471 people in 122 households. The 2016 census measured the population of the village as 405 in 109 households, by which time the rural district had been separated from the district in the formation of Gheyzaniyeh District. Damgheh-ye Bozorg was transferred to Soveyseh Rural District of Soveyseh District in the new Karun County.
