= Ab Khuda'i =

- Village
- Location of Ab Khuda'i in Afghanistan
- Coordinates: 34.9°N 62.7°E
- Country: Afghanistan
- Province: Herat
- District: Kushki Kohna
- Time zone: UTC+4:30 (Afghanistan Standard Time)

Ab Khuda'i or Abzi Khuda'i is a village in the west of Ab Kamari District in Herat Province, of north-west Afghanistan. Its population, consists of approximately 90% Tajik with a small Pashtun, Aimaq and Uzbek minority. Other localities include Alkhan, Anjir, Duzdanak, Gana Gul, Khalifa, and Papal. The village used to be in Badghis Province.
