= Damgheh-ye Kuchek =

Village in Khuzestan province, Iran

Damgheh-ye Kuchek Persian: دامغه کوچک
- Village
- Location within Iran
- Coordinates: 31°16′02″N 48°45′34″E
- Country: Iran
- Province: Khuzestan
- County: Karun
- District: Soveyseh
- Rural District: Soveyseh

Population (2016)
  - Total: 405
- Time zone: UTC+3:30 (IRST)

Damgheh-ye Kuchek (Persian: دامغه کوچک) (Note: Also romanized as Dāmgheh-ye Kūchek; also known as Dāmgām, Damgeh, and Dāmgheh) is a village in Soveyseh Rural District of Soveyseh District, Karun County, Khuzestan province, Iran.

== Demographics ==
=== Population ===
At the time of the 2006 National Census, the village's population was 324 in 72 households, when it was in Mosharrahat Rural District of the Central District of Ahvaz County. The following census in 2011 counted 363 people in 97 households. The 2016 census measured the population of the village as 313 in 90 households, by which time the rural district had been separated from the district in the formation of Gheyzaniyeh District. Damgheh-ye Kuchek was transferred to Soveyseh Rural District of Soveyseh District in the new Karun County.
