= Cheqa Jangeh-ye Olya =

Village in Kermanshah, Iran

Cheqa Jangeh-ye Olya چقاجنگه عليا
- Village
- Location within Iran
- Coordinates: 33°58′38″N 46°42′08″E
- Country: Iran
- Province: Kermanshah
- County: Eslamabad-e Gharb
- Bakhsh: Central
- Rural District: Howmeh-ye Jonubi

Population (2006)
  - Total: 388
- Time zone: UTC+3:30 (IRST)
  - Summer (DST): UTC+4:30 (IRDT)

Cheqa Jangeh-ye Olya (Persian: چقاجنگه عليا, also Romanized as Cheqā Jangeh-ye ‘Olyā and Cheqā Jengāh-e ‘Olyā; also known as Chakā Zhāngeh, Chaqā Jangā-ye ‘Olyā, Chega Janga, Chega Jangeh, Chegha Changa Olya, Cheqā Jengā, Cheqā Jengāy, Cheqā Jengā-ye ‘Olyā, and Chīā Jengeh-ye ‘Olyā) is a village in Howmeh-ye Jonubi Rural District, in the Central District of Eslamabad-e Gharb County, Kermanshah Province, Iran. At the 2006 census, its population was 388, in 84 families.
