= Kamareh-ye Olya =

Kamareh-ye Olya كمره عليا
- Village
- Location within Iran
- Coordinates: 34°04′07″N 46°47′36″E
- Country: Iran
- Province: Kermanshah
- County: Eslamabad-e Gharb
- Bakhsh: Central
- Rural District: Hasanabad

Population (2006)
  - Total: 383
- Time zone: UTC+3:30 (IRST)
  - Summer (DST): UTC+4:30 (IRDT)

Kamareh-ye Olya (Persian: كمره عليا, also Romanized as Kamareh-ye ‘Olyā; also known as Kamārah and Kamareh) is a village in Hasanabad Rural District, in the Central District of Eslamabad-e Gharb County, Kermanshah Province, Iran. At the 2006 census, its population was 383, in 82 families.
