= Malak al-Kashif =

Egyptian Human rights activist

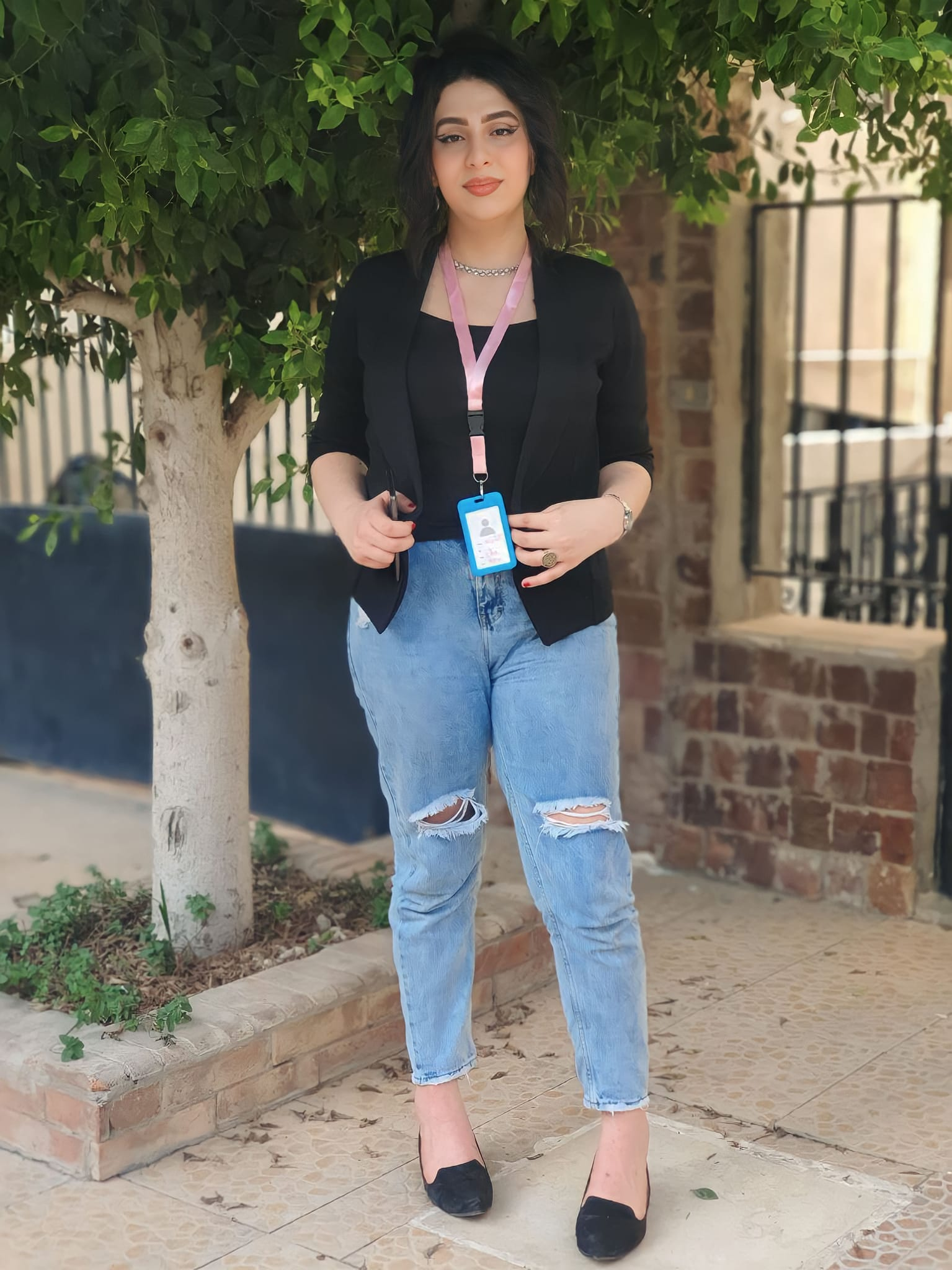
- Born: November 1, 1999 (age 26)

Malak al-Kashif (born 1 November 1999) is an Egyptian human rights and LGBT rights activist. Al-Kashif is the first known openly transgender Egyptian to be arrested for political reasons.

== Early life ==
Al-Kashif was raised in a religious household in Abha, Saudi Arabia, alongside two older sisters and a brother. She memorized parts of the Quran as a child. In 2007, her family moved to Cairo.

As a child, al-Kashif felt more comfortable around girls than boys. At age 6, she had recurring dreams in which she wore a wedding dress. Al-Kashif first learned about transgender people through a negative comment made by her sister about actress Hanan al-Tawil, the first openly transgender Egyptian actress.

At age nine, al-Kashif told her parents that she was a girl; in response, her father beat her. Her family began trying to change al-Kashif's more feminine behavior and preferences, and al-Kashif tried to act as a boy in order to avoid confrontations with her family. However, she would take women's clothing and make-up from her relatives and wear them outside the house. This made her the target of violence both on the street and at school.

Al-Kashif left home on her birthday in 2013. She lived on the streets for a time, sometimes sleeping in parks or staying up all night. She made money sweeping at a hair salon and mopping staircases. On al-Kashif's 18th birthday in 2017, she called her mother in an attempt to reestablish a relationship with her family. She was able to visit her family, and established a tense relationship with them.

In 2018, al-Kashif attempted suicide in light of society's poor treatment of her. She survived, but faced difficulty in obtaining proper medical care; she was placed in male wards, and medical staff threatened her with arrest.

By 2019, al-Kashif had been petitioning to change her gender on official paperwork for three years.

== Activism ==
In 2015, al-Kashif began learning more about politics, feminism, and LGBTQ rights. She became interested in the effects of political repression on individual rights, and became determined to be politically active so as to improve her life and the lives of other transgender people.

Al-Kashif was first in the public eye in 2017, when she began posting about her transition on Facebook, and local media began to report on her.

She was briefly detained in 2017 and 2018 due to her political activity.

In 2022, al-Kashif released a video talking about her experiences as part of the United Nations video campaign Diversity in Adversity, which focuses on LGBT activists around the world. At the time, she was working at Transat, a trans rights organization. She was executive director of the organization by 2024.

In 2022, she received the Courage Award for the LGBTQ+ community from the International Studies Association (ISA)'s Queer Allies Caucus of Sexual and Gender Minorities (LGBTQA).

== Arrest and imprisonment ==
On March 6, 2019, al-Kashif was arrested by Egyptian security forces at her home in Giza. The arrest came after she participated in a protest calling for justice following a train accident in Cairo in late February; at least 34 other Egyptians associated with the protests were also arrested. She was charged with alleged "misuse of social media", a charge commonly used against peaceful protesters, and "aiding a terrorist group to oppose the state".

She was held overnight in a National Security Agency facility. The following day, the Supreme State Security Prosecution ordered her to be detained for 15 days. According to the Egyptian Commission for Rights and Freedoms (ECRF), al-Kashif was sexually assaulted at a state hospital by state authorities on March 10, a charge which the government later denied. Her whereabouts were unknown to her friends and her lawyers until four days after her arrest, when they found her at the New Cairo Prosecution. She had been put in solitary confinement, as authorities couldn't determine whether to house her with male or female inmates.

Al-Kashif's arrest was widely discussed on social media, with users concerned for her safety. Several hundred users posted with the hashtag "in solidarity with Malak al-Kashef".

Al-Kashif was kept in solitary confinement as part of pre-trial detention at the Tora men's prison for four months. During that time, she continued to assert her identity to prison officials, and refused to respond to her legal 'dead' name. Prison officials eventually began referring to her by her chosen name, and as a woman. She was released from prison on July 16, 2019.

Al-Kashif and the Egyptian Commission for Rights and Freedoms (ECRF) later filed a lawsuit against the Ministry of Interior "to demand the allocation of safe detention places for transgender individuals". The lawsuit was rejected.
