= Darkhor-e Hasanabad =

Darkhvor-e Hasanabad دارخورحسن اباد
- Village
- Location within Iran
- Coordinates: 34°12′32″N 46°38′48″E
- Country: Iran
- Province: Kermanshah
- County: Eslamabad-e Gharb
- Bakhsh: Central
- Rural District: Hasanabad

Population (2006)
  - Total: 232
- Time zone: UTC+3:30 (IRST)
  - Summer (DST): UTC+4:30 (IRDT)

Darkhvor-e Hasanabad (Persian: دارخورحسن اباد, also Romanized as Dārkhvor-e Ḩasanābād; also known as Dārkhor-e Ḩasanābād) is a village in Hasanabad Rural District, in the Central District of Eslamabad-e Gharb County, Kermanshah Province, Iran. At the 2006 census, its population was 232, in 52 families.
