= Cheqa Jangeh-ye Sofla =

Village in Kermanshah, Iran

Cheqa Jangeh-ye Sofla چقاجنگه سفلي
- Village
- Location within Iran
- Coordinates: 33°58′50″N 46°42′08″E
- Country: Iran
- Province: Kermanshah
- County: Eslamabad-e Gharb
- Bakhsh: Central
- Rural District: Howmeh-ye Jonubi

Population (2006)
  - Total: 255
- Time zone: UTC+3:30 (IRST)
  - Summer (DST): UTC+4:30 (IRDT)

Cheqa Jangeh-ye Sofla (Persian: چقاجنگه سفلي, also Romanized as Cheqā Jangeh-ye Soflá and Cheqā Jengāh-e Soflá; also known as Chaqā Jangā-ye Soflá, Chegha Changa Sofla, and Cheqā Jengā-ye Soflá) is a village in Howmeh-ye Jonubi Rural District, in the Central District of Eslamabad-e Gharb County, Kermanshah Province, Iran. At the 2006 census, its population was 255, in 63 families.
