= Kanan, Khuzestan =

City in Khuzestan province, Iran

Kanan Persian: کنعان
- City
- Location within Iran
- Coordinates: 31°14′25″N 48°42′04″E
- Country: Iran
- Province: Khuzestan
- County: Karun
- District: Central

Population (2016)
  - Total: 10,764
- Time zone: UTC+3:30 (IRST)

Kanan (Persian: کنعان) (Note: Formerly Qaleh Chanan (قلعه چنان), also romanized as Qal‘eh Chan‘ān) is a city in the Central District of Karun County, Khuzestan province, Iran.

== Demographics ==
=== Population ===
At the time of the 2006 National Census, the population was 10,363 in 1,795 households, when it was the village of Qaleh Chanan in Soveyseh Rural District of the Central District of Ahvaz County. The following census in 2011 counted 11,705 people in 2,522 households. The 2016 census measured the population of the village as 10,764 people in 2,773 households, by which time the rural district had been separated from the county in the establishment of Karun County. The rural district was transferred to the new Central District, and Qaleh Chanan was transferred to Qaleh Chanan Rural District created in the district. It was the most populous village in its rural district.

After the census, the village was elevated to city status as Kanan.
