= Anjarak =

Anjarak or Anjerk (Persian: انجرك) may refer to:

- Anjarak, Isfahan
- Anjarak, Kerman
