= Mowmai =

Village in Kermanshah province, Iran

Mowmai Persian: مومئي
- Village
- Location within Iran
- Coordinates: 34°01′12″N 46°36′31″E
- Country: Iran
- Province: Kermanshah
- County: Eslamabad-e Gharb
- District: Central
- Rural District: Howmeh-ye Jonubi

Population (2016)
  - Total: 1,211
- Time zone: UTC+3:30 (IRST)

Mowmai (Persian: مومئي) (Note: Also romanized as Mowma’ī) is a village in, and the capital of, Howmeh-ye Jonubi Rural District of the Central District of Eslamabad-e Gharb County, Kermanshah province, Iran.

== Demographics ==
=== Population ===
At the time of the 2006 National Census, the village's population was 1,301 in 251 households. The following census in 2011 counted 1,321 people in 340 households. The 2016 census measured the population of the village as 1,211 people in 360 households.
