= Khosraviyeh =

Khosraviyeh (Persian: خسرويه) may refer to:

- Khosraviyeh, Khuzestan
- Khosraviyeh, North Khorasan

== See also ==
Khosravi (disambiguation)
