= Karim Haseleh-ye Sofla =

Karim Haseleh-ye Sofla كريم حاصله سفلي
- Village
- Location within Iran
- Coordinates: 34°08′13″N 46°37′45″E
- Country: Iran
- Province: Kermanshah
- County: Eslamabad-e Gharb
- Bakhsh: Central
- Rural District: Hasanabad

Population (2006)
  - Total: 103
- Time zone: UTC+3:30 (IRST)
  - Summer (DST): UTC+4:30 (IRDT)

Karim Haseleh-ye Sofla (Persian: كريم حاصله سفلي, also Romanized as Karīm Ḩaşeleh-ye Soflá) is a village in Hasanabad Rural District, in the Central District of Eslamabad-e Gharb County, Kermanshah Province, Iran. At the 2006 census, its population was 103, in 20 families.
