= Azab, Iran =

Azab, Iran may refer to:

- Azab, Khuzestan (اعضب – A‘ẕab)
- Azab, West Azerbaijan (عذاب – ‘Az̄āb)
