= Khosraviyeh, Khuzestan =

Khosraviyeh خسرويه
- Village
- Location within Iran
- Coordinates: 31°03′00″N 48°48′06″E
- Country: Iran
- Province: Khuzestan
- County: Karun
- Bakhsh: Central
- Rural District: Qaleh Chenan

Population (2006)
  - Total: 151
- Time zone: UTC+3:30 (IRST)
  - Summer (DST): UTC+4:30 (IRDT)

Khosraviyeh (Persian: خسرويه, also Romanized as Khosravīyeh; also known as Khosravī) is a village in Qaleh Chenan Rural District, in the Central District of Karun County, Khuzestan Province, Iran. At the 2006 census, its population was 151, in 21 families.
