= Sia Sia-ye Keykhosrow =

Sia Sia-ye Keykhosrow سياسياي كيخسرو
- Village
- Location within Iran
- Coordinates: 33°59′43″N 46°37′26″E
- Country: Iran
- Province: Kermanshah
- County: Eslamabad-e Gharb
- Bakhsh: Central
- Rural District: Howmeh-ye Jonubi

Population (2006)
  - Total: 679
- Time zone: UTC+3:30 (IRST)
  - Summer (DST): UTC+4:30 (IRDT)

Sia Sia-ye Keykhosrow (Persian: سياسياي كيخسرو, also Romanized as Sīā Sīā-ye Keykhosrow and Sīā Sīā Keykhosrow; also known as Sīā Sīā-ye Keykhosravī and Sīā Sīā-ye Keykhosrowvī) is a village in Howmeh-ye Jonubi Rural District, in the Central District of Eslamabad-e Gharb County, Kermanshah Province, Iran. At the 2006 census, its population was 679, in 146 families.
