= Qaleh-ye Shiyan =

Village in Kermanshah province, Iran

Qaleh-ye Shiyan Persian: قلعه شيان
- Village
- Location within Iran
- Coordinates: 34°03′59″N 46°41′46″E
- Country: Iran
- Province: Kermanshah
- County: Eslamabad-e Gharb
- District: Central
- Rural District: Shiyan

Population (2016)
  - Total: 1,923
- Time zone: UTC+3:30 (IRST)

Qaleh-ye Shiyan (Persian: قلعه شيان) (Note: Also romanized as Qal‘eh-ye Sheyān, Qaleh-ye Shian, and Qal‘eh-ye Shīān; also known as Shīān and Shīyān) is a village in, and the capital of, Shiyan Rural District of the Central District of Eslamabad-e Gharb County, Kermanshah province, Iran.

== Demographics ==
=== Population ===
At the time of the 2006 National Census, the village's population was 2,252 in 514 households. The following census in 2011 counted 2,217 people in 600 households. The 2016 census measured the population of the village as 1,923 people in 586 households. It was the most populous village in its rural district.
