= Isma'iliyya =

Isma'iliyya may refer to:

- Isma'ilism
- Ismailia
- Ismailia Governorate
- Ismaïlia Canal

== See also ==
- Esmailiyeh (disambiguation)
