= Siah Siah-ye Habib =

Siah Siah-ye Habib سياه سياه حبيب
- Village
- Location within Iran
- Coordinates: 33°59′22″N 46°38′07″E
- Country: Iran
- Province: Kermanshah
- County: Eslamabad-e Gharb
- Bakhsh: Central
- Rural District: Howmeh-ye Jonubi

Population (2006)
  - Total: 84
- Time zone: UTC+3:30 (IRST)
  - Summer (DST): UTC+4:30 (IRDT)

Siah Siah-ye Habib (Persian: سياه سياه حبيب, also Romanized as Sīāh Sīāh-ye Ḩabīb; also known as Sīā Sīā Jīb, Sīā Sīā-ye Ḩabīb, and Sīyā Sīyā) is a village in Howmeh-ye Jonubi Rural District, in the Central District of Eslamabad-e Gharb County, Kermanshah Province, Iran. At the 2006 census, its population was 84, in 17 families.
