= Siah Siah-ye Sheykheh =

Siah Siah-ye Sheykheh سياه سياه شيخه
- Village
- Location within Iran
- Coordinates: 34°00′30″N 46°36′44″E
- Country: Iran
- Province: Kermanshah
- County: Eslamabad-e Gharb
- Bakhsh: Central
- Rural District: Howmeh-ye Jonubi

Population (2006)
  - Total: 224
- Time zone: UTC+3:30 (IRST)
  - Summer (DST): UTC+4:30 (IRDT)

Siah Siah-ye Sheykheh (Persian: سياه سياه شيخه, also Romanized as Sīāh Sīāh-ye Sheykheh; also known as Sheykheh, Siahsia, Sīā Sīā, and Sīā Sīā-ye Sheykheh) is a village in Howmeh-ye Jonubi Rural District, in the Central District of Eslamabad-e Gharb County, Kermanshah Province, Iran. At the 2006 census, its population was 224, in 52 families.
