= Siah Siah-ye Khosravi =

Siah Siah-ye Khosravi سياه سياه خسروي
- Village
- Country: Iran
- Province: Kermanshah
- County: Eslamabad-e Gharb
- Bakhsh: Central
- Rural District: Howmeh-ye Jonubi

Population (2006)
  - Total: 68
- Time zone: UTC+3:30 (IRST)
  - Summer (DST): UTC+4:30 (IRDT)

Siah Siah-ye Khosravi (Persian: سياه سياه خسروي, also Romanized as Sīāh Sīāh-ye Khosravī) is a village in Howmeh-ye Jonubi Rural District, in the Central District of Eslamabad-e Gharb County, Kermanshah Province, Iran. At the 2006 census, its population was 68, in 13 families.
