= Anjir =

- Location in Afghanistan
- Coordinates: 37°11′N 71°33′E
- Country: Afghanistan
- Province: Takhar Province

Anjir is a village in Afghanistan, about seven miles south of Chayab. At the turn of the 20th century, there were roughly 40 families there. There are roads there leading to Yang Kala by the Anjirak Pass, as well as another road to Daung and Ragh.
