= Jowzeh-ye Anjirak =

Jowzeh-ye Anjirak جوزه انجيرك
- Village
- Location within Iran
- Coordinates: 34°01′10″N 46°27′33″E
- Country: Iran
- Province: Kermanshah
- County: Eslamabad-e Gharb
- Bakhsh: Central
- Rural District: Howmeh-ye Jonubi

Population (2006)
  - Total: 85
- Time zone: UTC+3:30 (IRST)
  - Summer (DST): UTC+4:30 (IRDT)

Jowzeh-ye Anjirak (Persian: جوزه انجيرك, also Romanized as Jowzeh-ye Anjīrak; also known as Anjīrak) is a village in Howmeh-ye Jonubi Rural District, in the Central District of Eslamabad-e Gharb County, Kermanshah Province, Iran. At the 2006 census, its population was 85, in 18 families.
