= Barfabad-e Olya =

Village in Kermanshah province, Iran

Barfabad-e Olya Persian: برف ابادعليا
- Village
- Location within Iran
- Coordinates: 34°05′09″N 46°31′58″E
- Country: Iran
- Province: Kermanshah
- County: Eslamabad-e Gharb
- District: Central
- Rural District: Howmeh-ye Jonubi

Population (2016)
  - Total: 1,792
- Time zone: UTC+3:30 (IRST)

Barfabad-e Olya (Persian: برف ابادعليا) (Note: Also romanized as Barfābād-e ‘Olyā; also known as Barfābād) is a village in Howmeh-ye Jonubi Rural District of the Central District of Eslamabad-e Gharb County, Kermanshah province, Iran.

== Demographics ==
=== Population ===
At the time of the 2006 National Census, the village's population was 1,343 in 304 households. The following census in 2011 counted 1,671 people in 443 households. The 2016 census measured the population of the village as 1,792 people in 527 households. It was the most populous village in its rural district.
