= Siah Siah, Ravansar =

Siah Siah سياه سياه
- Village
- Location within Iran
- Coordinates: 34°35′42″N 46°37′12″E
- Country: Iran
- Province: Kermanshah
- County: Ravansar
- Bakhsh: Central
- Rural District: Zalu Ab

Population (2006)
  - Total: 58
- Time zone: UTC+3:30 (IRST)
  - Summer (DST): UTC+4:30 (IRDT)

Siah Siah (Persian: سياه سياه, also Romanized as Sīāh Sīāh; also known as Sīāh Sīāh-e Sanjābī) is a village in Zalu Ab Rural District, in the Central District of Ravansar County, Kermanshah Province, Iran. At the 2006 census, its population was 58, in 11 families.
