= Anjirak, Khuzestan =

Anjirak انجيرك
- Village
- Location within Iran
- Coordinates: 32°17′47″N 48°24′27″E
- Country: Iran
- Province: Khuzestan
- County: Dezful
- Bakhsh: Central
- Rural District: Shamsabad

Population (2006)
  - Total: 3,704
- Time zone: UTC+3:30 (IRST)
  - Summer (DST): UTC+4:30 (IRDT)

Anjirak (Persian: انجيرك, also Romanized as Anjīrak) is a village in Shamsabad Rural District, in the Central District of Dezful County, Khuzestan Province, Iran. At the 2006 census, its population was 3,704, in 700 families.
