= Azaw, Afghanistan =

Azaw Āzāb
- Village
- Location in Afghanistan
- Coordinates: 33°04′03″N 63°00′8″E
- Country: Afghanistan
- Province: Farah Province
- Elevation: 1,288 m (4,226 ft)
- Time zone: + 4.30

Azaw (Pashto: آزو) also Āzāb is a village in Farah Province, in western Afghanistan. It is located beside the Azow (Azau) River.
