= Siah Siah-e Dayar =

Siah Siah-e Dayar سياه سياه دايار
- Village
- Location within Iran
- Coordinates: 34°33′30″N 46°36′47″E
- Country: Iran
- Province: Kermanshah
- County: Kermanshah
- Bakhsh: Kuzaran
- Rural District: Sanjabi

Population (2006)
  - Total: 139
- Time zone: UTC+3:30 (IRST)
  - Summer (DST): UTC+4:30 (IRDT)

Siah Siah-e Dayar (Persian: سياه سياه دايار, also Romanized as Sīāh Sīāh-e Dāyār) is a village in Sanjabi Rural District, Kuzaran District, Kermanshah County, Kermanshah Province, Iran. At the 2006 census, its population was 139, in 29 families.
