= Kamareh-ye Mishnan =

Kamareh-ye Mishnan كمره ميشنان
- Village
- Location within Iran
- Coordinates: 33°24′15″N 47°34′12″E
- Country: Iran
- Province: Lorestan
- County: Kuhdasht
- Bakhsh: Central
- Rural District: Gol Gol

Population (2006)
  - Total: 396
- Time zone: UTC+3:30 (IRST)
  - Summer (DST): UTC+4:30 (IRDT)

Kamareh-ye Mishnan (Persian: كمره ميشنان, also Romanized as Kamareh-ye Mīshnān; also known as Kamareh, Mīshnān, and Tang-e Hāleh) is a village in Gol Gol Rural District, in the Central District of Kuhdasht County, Lorestan Province, Iran. At the 2006 census, its population was 396, in 88 families.
