= Boreyje =

Boreyje بريجع
- Village
- Location within Iran
- Coordinates: 30°47′12″N 48°48′33″E
- Country: Iran
- Province: Khuzestan
- County: Shadegan
- Bakhsh: Central
- Rural District: Hoseyni

Population (2006)
  - Total: 138
- Time zone: UTC+3:30 (IRST)
  - Summer (DST): UTC+4:30 (IRDT)

Boreyje (Persian: بريجع, also Romanized as Boreyje‘ and Bereyjeh; also known as Baraījah, Bereycheh, Boreycheh, and Borījeh) is a village in Hoseyni Rural District, in the Central District of Shadegan County, Khuzestan Province, Iran. At the 2006 census, its population was 138, in 22 families.
