= Kamareh, Lorestan =

Kamareh كمره
- Village
- Location within Iran
- Coordinates: 33°30′37″N 48°28′03″E
- Country: Iran
- Province: Lorestan
- County: Khorramabad
- Bakhsh: Central
- Rural District: Dehpir-e Shomali

Population (2006)
  - Total: 138
- Time zone: UTC+3:30 (IRST)
  - Summer (DST): UTC+4:30 (IRDT)

Kamareh (Persian: كمره, also Romanized as Kamerah) is a village in Dehpir-e Shomali Rural District, in the Central District of Khorramabad County, Lorestan Province, Iran. At the 2006 census, its population was 138, in 28 families.
