= Qaleh Chanan Rural District =

Rural district in Khuzestan province, Iran

Qaleh Chanan Rural District Persian: دهستان قلعه چنان
- Rural District
- Location within Iran
- Coordinates: 31°03′17″N 48°47′30″E
- Country: Iran
- Province: Khuzestan
- County: Karun
- District: Central
- Capital: Al Aqda

Population (2016)
  - Total: 11,641
- Time zone: UTC+3:30 (IRST)

Qaleh Chanan Rural District (Persian: دهستان قلعه چنان) is in the Central District of Karun County, Khuzestan province, Iran. Its capital is the village of Al Aqda.

== History ==
After the 2011 National Census, Kut-e Abdollah and Soveyseh Rural Districts were separated from Ahvaz County in the establishment of Karun County, and Qaleh Chanan Rural District was created in the new Central District.

== Demographics ==
=== Population ===
At the time of the 2016 census, the rural district's population was 11,641 in 2,959 households. The most populous of its 16 villages was Qaleh Chanan (now the city of Kanan), with 10,764 people.
