= Darkhor-e Aqa Reza =

Darkhvor-e Aqa Reza دارخوراقارضا
- Village
- Location within Iran
- Coordinates: 34°23′27″N 46°36′13″E
- Country: Iran
- Province: Kermanshah
- County: Kermanshah
- Bakhsh: Kuzaran
- Rural District: Haft Ashiyan

Population (2006)
  - Total: 97
- Time zone: UTC+3:30 (IRST)
  - Summer (DST): UTC+4:30 (IRDT)

Darkhvor-e Aqa Reza (Persian: دارخوراقارضا, also Romanized as Dārkhvor-e Āqā Reẕā; also known as Dārkhor-e Āqā Reẕā) is a village in Haft Ashiyan Rural District, Kuzaran District, Kermanshah County, Kermanshah Province, Iran. At the 2006 census, its population was 97, in 22 families.
