= Kamareh-ye Hashem Beg =

Kamareh-ye Hashem Beg كمره هاشم بگ
- Village
- Country: Iran
- Province: Lorestan
- County: Kuhdasht
- Bakhsh: Central
- Rural District: Gol Gol

Population (2006)
  - Total: 89
- Time zone: UTC+3:30 (IRST)
  - Summer (DST): UTC+4:30 (IRDT)

Kamareh-ye Hashem Beg (Persian: كمره هاشم بگ, also Romanized as Kamareh-ye Hāshem Beg) is a village in Gol Gol Rural District, in the Central District of Kuhdasht County, Lorestan Province, Iran. At the 2006 census, its population was 89, in 15 families.
