= Mohammed Nadir Atash =

American businessman and writer

Mohammed Nadir Atash (born 1947) is an Afghan-American educator, philanthropist, entrepreneur, and author.

== Early life and education ==
M. Nadir Atash was born in Kabul, Afghanistan, the son of Afghan Army Issa Khan Noorestani. He attended The American University of Beirut, receiving a B.S. in Chemistry and came to the United States after the Soviet Invasion of Afghanistan in 1979. He went on to pursue a PhD in Educational Research at Florida State University.

== Afghanistan Reconstruction and Career at Ariana Airlines ==
Following the attacks of 9/11 and the U.S. invasion of Afghanistan, Atash returned to his country of birth to contribute to reconstruction efforts. After serving for three months as the Senior Adviser to the Ministry of Transport, Atash took a position as head of the country's primary airline carrier, Ariana.

During the rule of the Taliban, Ariana was used for narcotics trafficking and other terrorism-related activities, so Dr. Atash made efforts to implement modern systems of accounting and to make the airline safe for the annual hajj pilgrimage. He managed to secure a large deal with Boeing for Ariana , then eventually returned to the United States where he resides with his family today.
