= Shuhan-e Sofla, Kermanshah =

Shuhan-e Sofla شوهان سفلي
- Village
- Location within Iran
- Coordinates: 34°01′30″N 46°47′52″E
- Country: Iran
- Province: Kermanshah
- County: Eslamabad-e Gharb
- Bakhsh: Homeyl
- Rural District: Homeyl

Population (2006)
  - Total: 163
- Time zone: UTC+3:30 (IRST)
  - Summer (DST): UTC+4:30 (IRDT)

Shuhan-e Sofla (Persian: شوهان سفلي, also Romanized as Shūhān-e Soflá and Showhān-e Soflá; also known as Shūān, Shūfān, Shūhān, and Shian) is a village in Homeyl Rural District, Homeyl District, Eslamabad-e Gharb County, Kermanshah Province, and Iran. At the 2006 census, its population was 163, in 44 families.
