= Tavil, Quchan =

Tavil طويل
- Village
- Location within Iran
- Coordinates: 37°11′29″N 58°46′04″E
- Country: Iran
- Province: Razavi Khorasan
- County: Quchan
- Bakhsh: Central
- Rural District: Shirin Darreh

Population (2006)
  - Total: 137
- Time zone: UTC+3:30 (IRST)
  - Summer (DST): UTC+4:30 (IRDT)

Tavil (Persian: طويل, also Romanized as Ţavīl; also known as Tow and Tubīl) is a village in Shirin Darreh Rural District, in the Central District of Quchan County, Razavi Khorasan Province, Iran. At the 2006 census, its population was 137, in 31 families.
