= Sang-e Atash, Mashhad =

Sang-e Atash سنگاتش
- Village
- Location within Iran
- Coordinates: 36°31′00″N 59°36′25″E
- Country: Iran
- Province: Razavi Khorasan
- County: Mashhad
- Bakhsh: Central
- Rural District: Tabadkan

Population (2006)
  - Total: 29
- Time zone: UTC+3:30 (IRST)
  - Summer (DST): UTC+4:30 (IRDT)

Sang-e Atash (Persian: سنگاتش, also Romanized as Sang-e Ātash and Sang Ātash) is a village that is located in the Tabadkan Rural District, in the Central District of Mashhad County, Razavi Khorasan Province, Iran. At the 2006 census, its population was 29, in 7 families.
