= Anjiruk =

Anjiruk انجيروك
- Village
- Location within Iran
- Coordinates: 27°18′36″N 61°18′57″E
- Country: Iran
- Province: Sistan and Baluchestan
- County: Mehrestan
- Bakhsh: Central
- Rural District: Birk

Population (2006)
  - Total: 221
- Time zone: UTC+3:30 (IRST)
  - Summer (DST): UTC+4:30 (IRDT)

Anjiruk (Persian: انجيروك, also Romanized as Ānjīrūk; also known as Anjīrak, Anjīrbok, and Anjīrok) is a village in Birk Rural District, in the Central District of Mehrestan County, Sistan and Baluchestan Province, Iran. At the 2006 census, its population was 221, in 52 families.
