= Sang-e Atash, Torbat-e Jam =

Sang-e Atash سنگ اتش
- Village
- Location within Iran
- Coordinates: 35°23′27″N 60°50′57″E
- Country: Iran
- Province: Razavi Khorasan
- County: Torbat-e Jam
- Bakhsh: Central
- Rural District: Jamrud

Population (2006)
  - Total: 187
- Time zone: UTC+3:30 (IRST)
  - Summer (DST): UTC+4:30 (IRDT)

Sang-e Atash (Persian: سنگ اتش, also Romanized as Sang-e Ātash, Sang Ātash, and Sang Ātesh) is a village in Jamrud Rural District, in the Central District of Torbat-e Jam County, Razavi Khorasan Province, Iran. At the 2006 census, its population was 187, in 38 families.
