= Istgah-e Khosravi =

Istgah-e Khosravi ايستگاه خسروي
- Village
- Location within Iran
- Coordinates: 31°04′04″N 48°49′15″E
- Country: Iran
- Province: Khuzestan
- County: Ahvaz
- Bakhsh: Central
- Rural District: Mosharrahat

Population (2006)
  - Total: 458
- Time zone: UTC+3:30 (IRST)
  - Summer (DST): UTC+4:30 (IRDT)

Istgah-e Khosravi (Persian: ايستگاه خسروي, also Romanized as Īstgāh-e Khosravī; also known as Khosravī, Khosrovi, and Khusrovīeh) (literally "Khosravi station") is a village in Mosharrahat Rural District, in the Central District of Ahvaz County, Khuzestan Province, Iran. At the 2006 census, its population was 458, in 81 families.

In 2021 asphalt roads were constructed in the village.
