= Kamareh-ye Bala =

Kamareh-ye Bala كمره بالا
- Village
- Location within Iran
- Coordinates: 33°59′49″N 48°47′55″E
- Country: Iran
- Province: Lorestan
- County: Borujerd
- Bakhsh: Oshtorinan
- Rural District: Oshtorinan

Population (2016)
  - Total: 183
- Time zone: UTC+3:30 (IRST)
  - Summer (DST): UTC+4:30 (IRDT)

Kamareh-ye Bala (Persian: كمره بالا, also Romanized as Kamareh-ye Bālā; also known as Kamareh-ye 'Olyā, Kamereh, and Kemereh) is a village in Oshtorinan Rural District, Oshtorinan District, Borujerd County, Lorestan province, Iran. The village has a decling population from the 2006 census, where there were 260 people, in sixty-six families, to the 2016 census of 183 people, in sixty-four families.
