= JAF (cartoonist) =

American cartoonist

James Frankfort (1930–2005), working as JAF, was a cartoonist for The Village Voice. Frankfort was born in Belgium, served in the Korean War, and was a professor at New Paltz University.

== Works ==
- Cartoons, 1967
