= Khosravi, Qaen =

Khosravi خسروي
- Village
- Location within Iran
- Coordinates: 33°35′33″N 59°09′30″E
- Country: Iran
- Province: South Khorasan
- County: Qaen
- Bakhsh: Central
- Rural District: Qaen

Population (2006)
  - Total: 64
- Time zone: UTC+3:30 (IRST)
  - Summer (DST): UTC+4:30 (IRDT)

Khosravi (Persian: خسروي, also Romanized as Khosravī and Khusravi) is a village in Qaen Rural District, in the Central District of Qaen County, South Khorasan Province, Iran. At the 2006 census, its population was 64, in 20 families.
