= Kamareh-ye Heshmatabad =

Kamareh-ye Heshmatabad کمره حشمت آباد
- Village
- Location within Iran
- Coordinates: 34°01′00″N 47°53′01″E
- Country: Iran
- Province: Lorestan
- County: Delfan
- Bakhsh: Central
- Rural District: Nurabad

Population (2006)
  - Total: 65
- Time zone: UTC+3:30 (IRST)
  - Summer (DST): UTC+4:30 (IRDT)

Kamareh-ye Heshmatabad (Persian: کمره حشمت آباد, also Romanized as Kamareh-ye Ḩeshmatābād; also known as Kamareh) is a village in Nurabad Rural District, in the Central District of Delfan County, Lorestan Province, Iran. At the 2006 census, its population was 65, in 15 families.
