= Rabi, Iran =

City in Khuzestan province, Iran

Rabi Persian: ربیع
- City
- Location within Iran
- Coordinates: 31°14′30″N 48°37′31″E
- Country: Iran
- Province: Khuzestan
- County: Karun
- District: Central
- Established as a municipality: 2017
- Time zone: UTC+3:30 (IRST)

Rabi (Persian: ربیع) is a city in the Central District of Karun County, Khuzestan province, Iran. The city is the merger of four villages in 2017.

== History ==
In 2017, the villages of Abu Dabis, Amireh, Jongiyeh, and Kuy-e Vali Aser were merged to form the new city of Rabi.
