= Baricheh-ye Enayat =

Baricheh-ye Enayat بريچه عنايت
- Village
- Location within Iran
- Coordinates: 31°10′11″N 49°08′41″E
- Country: Iran
- Province: Khuzestan
- County: Ahvaz
- Bakhsh: Central
- Rural District: Gheyzaniyeh

Population (2006)
  - Total: 23
- Time zone: UTC+3:30 (IRST)
  - Summer (DST): UTC+4:30 (IRDT)

Baricheh-ye Enayat (Persian: بريچه عنايت, also Romanized as Barīcheh-ye ‘Enāyat and Bereycheh-ye ‘Anāyat; also known as Abū Seleyb Khān-e Kūchek, Barījeh-ye ‘Enāyat, Bereyḩeh-ye ‘Enāyat, and Berīcheh) is a village in Gheyzaniyeh Rural District, in the Central District of Ahvaz County, Khuzestan Province, Iran. At the 2006 census, its population was 23, in 4 families.
