= Anjirak (Afghanistan) =

- Anjīrak

Highest point
- Coordinates: 37°29′N 69°40′E

Geography
- Location: Afghanistan

Anjirak is the name of a mountain pass in Afghanistan. It lies to the left of the Chayab valley and is said to not present any particular difficulties to cross.
