= Anjirak, Baft =

Anjirak انجيرك
- Village
- Location within Iran
- Coordinates: 29°11′03″N 56°43′39″E
- Country: Iran
- Province: Kerman
- County: Baft
- Bakhsh: Central
- Rural District: Bezenjan

Population (2006)
  - Total: 467
- Time zone: UTC+3:30 (IRST)
  - Summer (DST): UTC+4:30 (IRDT)

Anjirak (Persian: انجيرك, also Romanized as Anjīrak and Anjīrk; also known as Anjarak and Anjerk) is a village in Bezenjan Rural District, in the Central District of Baft County, Kerman Province, Iran. At the 2006 census, its population was 467, in 109 families.
