= Hanan El Tawil =

Egyptian actress and singer

- Born: February 12, 1966; Sinnuris, Faiyum
- Died: December 1, 2004 (aged 38); Cairo

Hanan El Tawil (also spelled Hannan Eltaweil and Hanan El Taweil; Arabic: حنان الطويل; February 12, 1966, in Sinnuris, Faiyum – December 1, 2004, in Cairo) was an Egyptian actress who played roles in cinema, comedy, and theater. She was the first transgender actress in Egypt. Her death in 2004 is speculated to be a suicide due to mental illness exacerbated by frequent harassment. She was the subject of a documentary by Egyptian LGBTQ advocacy group No Hate Egypt.

== Notable roles ==
- Al-Nazer (The Principal, 2000) - English teacher Miss Inshirah
- 55 Esaaf (2001) - Neighbor Aziza
- Askar fi el-mu'askar (2003) - El Set Korea
