= Kut-e Abdollah, Khuzestan =

City in Khuzestan province, Iran

Kut-e Abdollah Persian: كوت عبدالله
- City
- Location within Iran
- Coordinates: 31°14′41″N 48°39′34″E
- Country: Iran
- Province: Khuzestan
- County: Karun
- District: Central
- Established as a municipality: 2013

Population (2016)
  - Total: 56,252
- Time zone: UTC+3:30 (IRST)

Kut-e Abdollah, 2022

Kut-e Abdollah (Persian: كوت عبدالله) is a city in the Central District of Karun County, Khuzestan province, Iran, serving as capital of the county. The city is the merger of the village of Kut-e Abdollah with nine other villages in 2013.

== Demographics ==
=== Population ===
At the time of the 2006 National Census, Kut-e Abdollah's population was 8,170 in 1,518 households, when it was a village in Kut-e Abdollah Rural District of the Central District of Ahvaz County. The following census in 2011 counted 8,132 people in 1,980 households. The 2016 census measured the population as 56,252 people in 14,714 households, by which time the rural district had been separated from the county in the establishment of Karun County. The rural district was transferred to the new Central District, and the village merged with Astishan, Darvishabad, Gavmishabad, Gondamakar, Hadiabad, Khazami, Kut-e Navaser, Kuy-e Montazeri, and Shariati-ye Yek to form the city of Kut-e Abdollah.
