= Shiyan Rural District =

Rural district in Kermanshah province, Iran

Shiyan Rural District Persian: دهستان شيان
- Rural District
- Location within Iran
- Coordinates: 34°03′39″N 46°40′49″E
- Country: Iran
- Province: Kermanshah
- County: Shahabad-e Gharb
- District: Central
- Capital: Qaleh-ye Shiyan

Population (2016)
  - Total: 5,742
- Time zone: UTC+3:30 (IRST)

Shiyan Rural District (Persian: دهستان شيان) is in the Central District of Eslamabad-e Gharb County, Kermanshah province, Iran. Its capital is the village of Qaleh-ye Shiyan.

== Demographics ==
=== Population ===
At the time of the 2006 National Census, the rural district's population was 6,801 in 1,512 households. There were 6,633 inhabitants in 1,736 households at the following census of 2011. The 2016 census measured the population of the rural district as 5,742 in 1,718 households. The most populous of its 15 villages was Qaleh-ye Shiyan, with 1,923 people.
