= Muran Rural District =

Rural district in Khuzestan province, Iran

Muran Rural District Persian: دهستان موران
- Rural District
- Location within Iran
- Coordinates: 31°05′08″N 48°28′50″E
- Country: Iran
- Province: Khuzestan
- County: Karun
- District: Soveyseh
- Capital: Bahar

Population (2016)
  - Total: 11,729
- Time zone: UTC+3:30 (IRST)

Muran Rural District (Persian: دهستان موران) is in Soveyseh District of Karun County, Khuzestan province, Iran. Its capital is the village of Bahar.

== History ==
After the 2011 National Census, Kut-e Abdollah and Soveyseh Rural Districts were separated from Ahvaz County in the establishment of Karun County, and Muran Rural District was created in the new Soveyseh District.

== Demographics ==
=== Population ===
At the time of the 2016 census, the rural district's population was 11,729 in 3,015 households. The most populous of its 17 villages was Bahar, with 2,416 people.
