= Hasanabad Rural District (Eslamabad-e Gharb County) =

Rural district in Kermanshah province, Iran

Hasanabad Rural District Persian: دهستان حسن آباد
- Rural District
- Location within Iran
- Coordinates: 34°06′16″N 46°45′18″E
- Country: Iran
- Province: Kermanshah
- County: Eslamabad-e Gharb County
- District: Central
- Capital: Hasanabad

Population (2016)
  - Total: 8,783
- Time zone: UTC+3:30 (IRST)

Hasanabad Rural District (Persian: دهستان حسن آباد) is in the Central District of Eslamabad-e Gharb County, Kermanshah province, Iran. Its capital is the village of Hasanabad.

== Demographics ==
=== Population ===
At the time of the 2006 National Census, the rural district's population was 9,893 in 2,139 households. There were 9,617 inhabitants in 2,405 households at the following census of 2011. The 2016 census measured the population of the rural district as 8,783 in 2,477 households. The most populous of its 29 villages was Hasanabad, with 913 people.
