= Soveyseh Rural District =

Rural district in Khuzestan province, Iran

Soveyseh Rural District Persian: دهستان سويسه
- Rural District
- Location within Iran
- Coordinates: 31°02′51″N 48°38′58″E
- Country: Iran
- Province: Khuzestan
- County: Karun
- District: Soveyseh
- Capital: Abu Nageh

Population (2016)
  - Total: 11,451
- Time zone: UTC+3:30 (IRST)

Soveyseh Rural District (Persian: دهستان سويسه) is in Soveyseh District of Karun County, Khuzestan province, Iran. Its capital is the village of Abu Nageh.

== Demographics ==
=== Population ===
At the time of the 2006 National Census, the rural district's population (as a part of the Central District of Ahvaz County) was 18,910 in 3,299 households. There were 19,847 inhabitants in 4,313 households at the following census of 2011. The 2016 census measured the population of the rural district as 11,451 in 2,931 households, by which time the rural district had been separated from the county in the establishment of Karun County and transferred to the new Soveyseh District. The most populous of its 36 villages was Eslamabad, with 2,024 people.

== See also ==
Damgheh-ye Bozorg and Damgheh-ye Kuchek, villages in the rural district
