= Howmeh-ye Jonubi Rural District =

Rural district in Kermanshah province, Iran

Howmeh-ye Jonubi Rural District Persian: دهستان حومه جنوبي
- Rural District
- Location within Iran
- Coordinates: 34°02′37″N 46°31′35″E
- Country: Iran
- Province: Kermanshah
- County: Shshabad-e Gharb
- District: Central
- Capital: Mowmai

Population (2016)
  - Total: 14,091
- Time zone: UTC+3:30 (IRST)

Howmeh-ye Jonubi Rural District (Persian: دهستان حومه جنوبي) is in the Central District of Eslamabad-e Gharb County, Kermanshah province, Iran. Its capital is the village of Mowmai.

== Demographics ==
=== Population ===
At the time of the 2006 National Census, the rural district's population was 15,173 in 3,376 households. There were 15,373 inhabitants in 3,834 households at the following census of 2011. The 2016 census measured the population of the rural district as 14,091 in 3,934 households. The most populous of its 51 villages was Barfabad-e Olya, with 1,792 people.
