= Kut-e Abdollah Rural District =

Rural district in Khuzestan province, Iran

Kut-e Abdollah Rural District Persian: دهستان كوت عبدالله
- Rural District
- Location within Iran
- Coordinates: 31°12′37″N 48°37′17″E
- Country: Iran
- Province: Khuzestan
- County: Karun
- District: Central
- Capital: Mozaffariyeh

Population (2016)
  - Total: 14,799
- Time zone: UTC+3:30 (IRST)

Kut-e Abdollah Rural District (Persian: دهستان كوت عبدالله) is in the Central District of Karun County, Khuzestan province, Iran. Its capital is the village of Mozaffariyeh. The previous capital of the rural district was the village of Bahar, and prior to that, the village of Kut-e Abdollah, now a city.

== Demographics ==
=== Population ===
At the time of the 2006 National Census, the rural district's population (as a part of the Central District of Ahvaz County) was 91,299 in 16,921 households. There were 89,477 inhabitants in 20,224 households at the following census of 2011. The 2016 census measured the population of the rural district as 14,799 in 4,130 households, by which time the rural district had been separated from the county in the establishment of Karun County and transferred to the new Central District. The most populous of its 19 villages was Jongiyeh, (Note: Now a neighborhood in the city of Rabi) with 4,644 people.
