= Soveyseh District =

District in Khuzestan province, Iran

Soveyseh District Persian: بخش سویسه
- District
- Location within Iran
- Coordinates: 31°03′15″N 48°34′47″E
- Country: Iran
- Province: Khuzestan
- County: Karun
- Capital: Abu Nageh

Population (2016)
  - Total: 23,180
- Time zone: UTC+3:30 (IRST)

Soveyseh District (Persian: بخش سویسه) is in Karun County, Khuzestan province, Iran. Its capital is the village of Abu Nageh.

== History ==
After the 2011 National Census, Kut-e Abdollah and Soveyseh Rural Districts were separated from Ahvaz County in the establishment of Karun County, which was divided into two districts of two rural districts each, with Kut-e Abdollah as its capital and only city.

After the census, Shirin Shahr was elevated to the status of a city.

== Demographics ==
=== Population ===
At the time of the 2016 census, the district's population was 23,180 inhabitants in 5,946 households.

=== Administrative divisions ===
Soveyseh District Population
Administrative Divisions	2016
Muran RD	11,729
Soveyseh RD	11,451
Shirin Shahr (city) (Note: Established after the 2016 census)	
Total	23,180
RD = Rural District
