= Central District (Karun County) =

District in Khuzestan province, Iran

Central District (Karun County) Persian: بخش مرکزی شهرستان کارون
- District
- Location within Iran
- Coordinates: 31°06′14″N 48°43′45″E
- Country: Iran
- Province: Khuzestan
- County: Karun
- Capital: Al Aqda

Population (2016)
  - Total: 82,692
- Time zone: UTC+3:30 (IRST)

The Central District of Karun County (Persian: بخش مرکزی شهرستان کارون) is in Khuzestan province, Iran. Its capital is the village of Al Aqda.

== History ==
After the 2011 National Census, Kut-e Abdollah and Soveyseh Rural Districts were separated from Ahvaz County in the establishment of Karun County, which was divided into two districts of two rural districts each, with Kut-e Abdollah as its capital and only city.

After the 2016 census, Kanan and Rabi were elevated to city status.

== Demographics ==
=== Population ===
At the time of the 2016 census, the district's population was 82,692 inhabitants in 21,803 households.

=== Administrative divisions ===
Central District (Karun County) Population
Administrative Divisions	2016
Kut-e Abdollah RD	14,799
Qaleh Chanan RD	11,641
Kanan (city) (Note: Formerly the village of Qaleh Chanan; became a city after the 2016 census)	
Kut-e Abdollah (city)	56,252
Rabi (city) (Note: Established after the 2016 census; merger of four villages)	
Total	82,692
RD = Rural District
