= Central District (Eslamabad-e Gharb County) =

District in Kermanshah province, Iran

Central District (Eslamabad-e Gharb County) Persian: بخش مرکزی شهرستان اسلام‌آباد غرب
- District
- Location within Iran
- Coordinates: 34°07′29″N 46°38′31″E
- Country: Iran
- Province: Kermanshah
- County: Eslamabad-e Gharb County
- Capital: Eslamabad-e Gharb

Population (2016)
  - Total: 124,304
- Time zone: UTC+3:30 (IRST)

The Central District of Eslamabad-e Gharb County (Persian: بخش مرکزی شهرستان اسلام‌آباد غرب) is in Kermanshah province, Iran. Its capital is the city of Eslamabad-e Gharb.

== Demographics ==
=== Population ===
At the time of the 2006 National Census, the district's population was 129,503 in 29,788 households. The following census in 2011 counted 132,123 people in 35,038 households. The 2016 census measured the population of the district as 124,304 inhabitants in 35,993 households.

=== Administrative divisions ===
Central District (Eslamabad-e Gharb County) Population
Administrative Divisions	2006	2011	2016
Hasanabad RD	9,893	9,617	8,783
Howmeh-ye Jonubi RD	15,173	15,373	14,091
Howmeh-ye Shomali RD	8,206	5,801	5,129
Shiyan RD	6,801	6,633	5,742
Eslamabad-e Gharb (city)	89,430	94,699	90,559
Total	129,503	132,123	124,304
RD = Rural District
