= Karun County =

County in Khuzestan province, Iran

Karun County Persian: شهرستان کارون
- County
- Location of Karun County in Khuzestan province (center left, yellow)

- Location of Khuzestan province in Iran
- Coordinates: 31°06′N 48°38′E
- Country: Iran
- Province: Khuzestan
- Capital: Kut-e Abdollah
- Districts: Central, Soveyseh

Population (2016)
  - Total: 105,872
- Time zone: UTC+3:30 (IRST)

Karun County (Persian: شهرستان کارون) is in Khuzestan province, Iran. Its capital is the city of Kut-e Abdollah.

== History ==
After the 2011 National Census, Kut-e Abdollah and Soveyseh Rural Districts were separated from Ahvaz County in the establishment of Karun County, which was divided into two districts of two rural districts each, with Kut-e Abdollah as its capital and only city.

After the 2016 census, Kanan, Rabi, and Shirin Shahr were elevated to city status.

== Demographics ==
=== Population ===
At the time of the 2016 census, the county's population was 105,872 in 27,749 households. The county's population is reported to be more than 200,000, according to the governorship of the county.

=== Administrative divisions ===
Karun County's population and administrative structure are shown in the following table.

Karun County Population
Administrative Divisions	2016
Central District	82,692
Kut-e Abdollah RD	14,799
Qaleh Chanan RD	11,641
Kanan (city) (Note: Formerly the village of Qaleh Chanan; became a city after the 2016 census)	
Kut-e Abdollah (city)	56,252
Rabi (city) (Note: Established after the 2016 census; merger of four villages)	
Soveyseh District	23,180
Muran RD	11,729
Soveyseh RD	11,451
Shirin Shahr (city) (Note: Established after the 2016 census)	
Total	105,872
RD = Rural District

== See also ==
Media related to Karun County at Wikimedia Commons
