= Kuik =

Kuik (Persian: كوئيك) may refer to:

- Saipa Kuik

== Villages ==
- Kuik, Kermanshah, village in Sarpol-e Zahab County, Kermanshah province
- Kuik, Kurdistan
- Kuik, West Azerbaijan
- Kuik-e Azizi Amin, former village merged into Kuik, Kermanshah
- Kuik-e Hasan, former village merged into Kuik, Kermanshah
- Kuik-e Mahmud, former village merged into Kuik, Kermanshah
- Kuik-e Majid, former village merged into Kuik, Kermanshah
- Kuik-e Shekar

== People ==
- Anne Kuik (born 1987), Dutch politician
- Laurens van Kuik (1889–1963), Dutch artist
- Tiiu Kuik (born 1987), Estonian fashion model
- Valentin Kuik (1943–2025), Estonian film director, screenwriter and writer

== See also ==
- KUIK
