= Mirmiru =

Village in Kermanshah province, Iran

Mirmiru Persian: ميرميرو
- Village
- Location within Iran
- Coordinates: 34°33′15″N 45°49′00″E
- Country: Iran
- Province: Kermanshah
- County: Sarpol-e Zahab
- District: Dasht-e Zahab
- Rural District: Dasht-e Zahab

Population (2016)
  - Total: 72
- Time zone: UTC+3:30 (IRST)

Mirmiru (Persian: ميرميرو) (Note: Also romanized as Mīrmīrū) is a village in, and the capital of, Dasht-e Zahab Rural District of Dasht-e Zahab District, Sarpol-e Zahab County, Kermanshah province, Iran.

== Demographics ==
=== Population ===
At the time of the 2006 National Census, the village's population was 70 in 14 households, when it was in the Central District. The following census in 2011 counted 74 people in 20 households. The 2016 census measured the population of the village as 72 people in 21 households.

After the 2016 census, Dasht-e Zahab, Jeygaran, Posht Tang, and Sarqaleh Rural Districts were separated from the Central District in the formation of Dasht-e Zahab District.
