= Kuyaki =

Kuyaki or Kuyeki (Persian: كوئيكئ) may refer to:

- Kuyaki-ye Aziz
- Kuyaki-ye Hasan
- Kuyaki-ye Mahmud
- Kuyaki-ye Majid
