= Qaleh Gelineh =

Neighborhood in Kermanshah province, Iran

Qaleh Gelineh Persian: قلعه گلينه
- Neighborhood
- Location within Iran
- Coordinates: 34°22′46″N 45°57′20″E
- Country: Iran
- Province: Kermanshah
- County: Sarpol-e Zahab
- District: Central
- Rural District: Qaleh Shahin
- Village: Davazdah Emam

Population (2011)
  - Total: 208
- Time zone: UTC+3:30 (IRST)

Qaleh Gelineh (Persian: قلعه گلينه) (Note: Also romanized as Qal‘eh Gelīneh, Qal‘eh Gellīneh, and Qal‘eh-ye Galīneh) is a neighborhood in the village of Qaleh Shahin Rural District in the Central District of Sarpol-e Zahab County, Kermanshah province, Iran.

== Demographics ==
=== Population ===
According to the 2006 National Census, Qaleh Geilineh had a population of 208 residents across 42 households, at which time it was still classified as a village. By the 2011 census, the population remained the same at 208, but the number of households had increased to 57.

After the census, the rural district was separated from the district in the formation of Qaleh Shahin District. The villages of Kah Sara and Qaleh Gelineh merged with the village of Davazdah Emam.
