= Sarbagh-e Golin =

Village in Kermanshah province, Iran

Sarbagh-e Golin Persian: سرباغ گلين
- Village
- Location within Iran
- Coordinates: 34°14′25″N 46°00′31″E
- Country: Iran
- Province: Kermanshah
- County: Sarpol-e Zahab
- District: Qaleh Shahin
- Rural District: Sarab-e Qaleh Shahin

Population (2016)
  - Total: 1,397
- Time zone: UTC+3:30 (IRST)

Sarbagh-e Golin (Persian: سرباغ گلين) (Note: Also romanized as Sarbāgh Golīn and Sarbāgh-e Golīn) is a village in Sarab-e Qaleh Shahin Rural District of Qaleh Shahin District, Sarpol-e Zahab County, Kermanshah province, Iran.

== Demographics ==
=== Population ===
At the time of the 2006 National Census, the village's population was 1,433 in 342 households, when it was in Qaleh Shahin Rural District of the Central District. The following census in 2011 counted 1,499 people in 418 households. The 2016 census measured the population of the village as 1,397 people in 430 households, by which time the rural district had been separated from the district in the formation of Qaleh Shahin District. Sarbagh-e Golin was transferred to Sarab-e Qaleh Shahin Rural District created in the new district. It was the most populous village in its rural district.
