= Sarab-e Qaleh Shahin =

Village in Kermanshah province, Iran

Sarab-e Qaleh Shahin Persian: سراب قلعه شاهين
- Village
- Location within Iran
- Coordinates: 34°20′03″N 45°58′09″E
- Country: Iran
- Province: Kermanshah
- County: Sarpol-e Zahab
- District: Qaleh Shahin
- Rural District: Sarab-e Qaleh Shahin

Population (2016)
  - Total: 664
- Time zone: UTC+3:30 (IRST)

Sarab-e Qaleh Shahin (Persian: سراب قلعه شاهين) (Note: Also romanized as Sarāb-e Qal‘eh Shāhīn and Sarāb-e Qal‘eh-ye Shāhīn; also known as Sarāb-e Abūz̄ar) is a village in, and the capital of Sarab-e Qaleh Shahin Rural District of Qaleh Shahin District, Sarpol-e Zahab County, Kermanshah province, Iran.

== Demographics ==
=== Population ===
At the time of the 2006 National Census, the village's population was 635 in 161 households, when it was in Qaleh Shahin Rural District of the Central District. The following census in 2011 counted 701 people in 200 households. The 2016 census measured the population of the village as 664 people in 207 households, by which time the rural district had been separated from the district in the formation of Qaleh Shahin District. Sarab-e Qaleh Shahin was transferred to Sarab-e Qaleh Shahin Rural District created in the new district.
