= Rizvand (disambiguation) =

Rizvand is a city in Gilan Province, Iran.

Rizvand or Riz Vand or Rezawand or Rizavand (Persian: ريزوند) may also refer to:

- Rizvand, Kermanshah
- Rizvand, Mahidasht, Kermanshah Province
- Rizvand-e Ali Akbar, Kermanshah Province
- Rizvand-e Najaf, Kermanshah Province

== See also ==
- Rizehvand (disambiguation)
