= Shamshir-e Darreh Rashid =

Shamshir-e Darreh Rashid شمشيرداره رشيد
- Village
- Location within Iran
- Coordinates: 34°32′43″N 45°51′58″E
- Country: Iran
- Province: Kermanshah
- County: Sarpol-e Zahab
- Bakhsh: Central
- Rural District: Howmeh-ye Sarpol

Population (2006)
  - Total: 209
- Time zone: UTC+3:30 (IRST)
  - Summer (DST): UTC+4:30 (IRDT)

Shamshir-e Darreh Rashid (Persian: شمشيرداره رشيد, also Romanized as Shamshīr-e Dārreh Rashīd; also known as Shamshīr-e Bālā) is a village in Howmeh-ye Sarpol Rural District, in the Central District of Sarpol-e Zahab County, Kermanshah Province, Iran. At the 2006 census, its population was 209, in 43 families.
