= Naveh Fereh =

Naveh Fereh ناوه فره
- Village
- Location within Iran
- Coordinates: 34°30′10″N 45°53′58″E
- Country: Iran
- Province: Kermanshah
- County: Sarpol-e Zahab
- Bakhsh: Central
- Rural District: Howmeh-ye Sarpol

Population (2006)
  - Total: 261
- Time zone: UTC+3:30 (IRST)
  - Summer (DST): UTC+4:30 (IRDT)

Naveh Fereh (Persian: ناوه فره, also Romanized as Nāveh Fereh) is a village in Howmeh-ye Sarpol Rural District, in the Central District of Sarpol-e Zahab County, Kermanshah Province, Iran. At the 2006 census, its population was 261, in 52 families.
