= Pataq =

Pataq پاطاق
- Village
- Location within Iran
- Coordinates: 34°24′56″N 46°00′10″E
- Country: Iran
- Province: Kermanshah
- County: Sarpol-e Zahab
- Bakhsh: Central
- Rural District: Beshiva Pataq

Population (2006)
  - Total: 315
- Time zone: UTC+3:30 (IRST)
  - Summer (DST): UTC+4:30 (IRDT)

Pataq (Persian: پاطاق, also Romanized as Pāţāq, Pā-ye Ţāq, and Pa yi Tāq) is a village in Beshiva Pataq Rural District, in the Central District of Sarpol-e Zahab County, Kermanshah Province, Iran. At the 2006 census, its population was 315, in 86 families.

== See also ==
- Taq-e Gara
