= Paleh Bid-e Sofla =

Paleh Bid-e Sofla پله بيدسفلي
- Village
- Location within Iran
- Coordinates: 34°24′50″N 45°57′59″E
- Country: Iran
- Province: Kermanshah
- County: Sarpol-e Zahab
- Bakhsh: Central
- Rural District: Beshiva Pataq

Population (2006)
  - Total: 61
- Time zone: UTC+3:30 (IRST)
  - Summer (DST): UTC+4:30 (IRDT)

Paleh Bid-e Sofla (Persian: پله بيدسفلي, also Romanized as Paleh Bīd-e Soflá; also known as Palebīd, Pal-e Bīd, and Paleh Bīd) is a village in Beshiva Pataq Rural District, in the Central District of Sarpol-e Zahab County, Kermanshah Province, Iran. At the 2006 census, its population was 61, in 17 families.
