= Kafru Bavakeh =

Kafru Bavakeh كفروباوكه
- Village
- Location within Iran
- Coordinates: 34°38′00″N 45°58′00″E
- Country: Iran
- Province: Kermanshah
- County: Sarpol-e Zahab
- Bakhsh: Central
- Rural District: Posht Tang

Population (2006)
  - Total: 119
- Time zone: UTC+3:30 (IRST)
  - Summer (DST): UTC+4:30 (IRDT)

Kafru Bavakeh (Persian: كفروباوكه, also Romanized as Kafrū Bāvakeh; also known as Kafrū Bābākīyeh-e Şayyādī) is a village in Posht Tang Rural District, in the Central District of Sarpol-e Zahab County, Kermanshah Province, Iran. At the 2006 census, its population was 119, in 21 families.
