= Saravareh-ye Vali Najafi =

Saravareh-ye Vali Najafi سراواره والي نجفي
- Village
- Location within Iran
- Coordinates: 34°38′38″N 45°59′37″E
- Country: Iran
- Province: Kermanshah
- County: Sarpol-e Zahab
- Bakhsh: Central
- Rural District: Posht Tang

Population (2006)
  - Total: 125
- Time zone: UTC+3:30 (IRST)
  - Summer (DST): UTC+4:30 (IRDT)

Saravareh-ye Vali Najafi (Persian: سراواره والي نجفي, also Romanized as Sarāvareh-ye Vālī Najafī; also known as Sarāvareh and Sar Āvāreh) is a village in Posht Tang Rural District, in the Central District of Sarpol-e Zahab County, Kermanshah Province, Iran. At the 2006 census, its population was 125, in 24 families.
