= Qaleh Bahadri =

Qaleh Bahadri قه‌ڵاواری Qeĺawarî
- Village
- Location within Iran
- Coordinates: 34°35′03″N 45°50′56″E
- Country: Iran
- Province: Kermanshah
- County: Sarpol-e Zahab
- Bakhsh: Central
- Rural District: Dasht-e Zahab

Population (2006)
  - Total: 215
- Time zone: UTC+3:30 (IRST)
  - Summer (DST): UTC+4:30 (IRDT)

Qaleh Bahadri (Kurdish: Qelawarî, قه‌ڵاواری, Persian: قلعه بهادري, also Romanized as Qal‘eh Bahādrī; also known as Qal‘eh Badrī) is a village in Dasht-e Zahab Rural District, in the Central District of Sarpol-e Zahab County, Kermanshah Province, Iran. According to the 2006 census, its population was recorded as 215 inhabitants, in 40 families.
