= Tolsem Shahbaz =

Coordinates: 34°40′10″N 45°59′17″E

Tolsem Shahbaz طلسم شهباز
- Village
- Interactive map of Tolsem Shahbaz
- Country: Iran
- Province: Kermanshah
- County: Sarpol-e Zahab
- Bakhsh: Central
- Rural District: Posht Tang

Population (2006)
  - Total: 186
- Time zone: UTC+3:30 (IRST)
  - Summer (DST): UTC+4:30 (IRDT)

Tolsem Shahbaz (Persian: طلسم شهباز, also Romanized as Ţolsem Shahbāz) is a village in Posht Tang Rural District, in the Central District of Sarpol-e Zahab County, Kermanshah Province, Iran. At the 2006 census, its population was 186, in 32 families.
