= Kah Sara =

Neighborhood in Kermanshah province, Iran

Kah Sara Persian: كاه سرا
- Neighborhood
- Location within Iran
- Coordinates: 34°22′06″N 45°58′11″E
- Country: Iran
- Province: Kermanshah
- County: Sarpol-e Zahab
- District: Central
- Rural District: Qaleh Shahin
- Village: Davazdah Emam

Population (2011)
  - Total: 463
- Time zone: UTC+3:30 (IRST)

Kah Sara (Persian: كاه سرا) (Note: Also romanized as Kāh Sarā; also known as Ḩājjī Mīrzā Khān, Kāh Sareh, Kālsarā, Kāsareh, Kāsehrāh, and Kāsereh) is a neighborhood in the village of Qaleh Shahin Rural District in the Central District of Sarpol-e Zahab County, Kermanshah province, Iran.

== Demographics ==
=== Population ===
At the time of the 2006 National Census, Kah Sara's population was 475 in 97 households, when it was a village. The following census in 2011 counted 463 people in 116 households.

After the census, the rural district was separated from the district in the formation of Qaleh Shahin District. The villages of Kah Sara and Qaleh Gelineh merged with the village of Davazdah Emam.
