= Rizehvand (disambiguation) =

Rizehvand is a village in Ilam Province, Iran.

Rizehvand (Persian: ريزه وند) may also refer to:

- Rizehvand, Kermanshah
- Rizehvand-e Ali Akbar, Kermanshah Province
- Rizehvand-e Najaf, Kermanshah Province

== See also ==
- Rizvand (disambiguation)
