= Qeytak =

Qeytak قيطك
- Village
- Location within Iran
- Coordinates: 34°25′19″N 45°52′07″E
- Country: Iran
- Province: Kermanshah
- County: Sarpol-e Zahab
- Bakhsh: Central
- Rural District: Qaleh Shahin

Population (2006)
  - Total: 362
- Time zone: UTC+3:30 (IRST)
  - Summer (DST): UTC+4:30 (IRDT)

Qeytak (Persian: قيطك, also Romanized as Qeyţak; also known as Qeyţag) is a village in Qaleh Shahin Rural District, in the Central District of Sarpol-e Zahab County, Kermanshah Province, Iran. At the 2006 census, its population was 362, in 84 families.
