= Salman Tappeh =

Salman Tappeh سلمان تپه
- Village
- Location within Iran
- Coordinates: 34°30′10″N 45°54′46″E
- Country: Iran
- Province: Kermanshah
- County: Sarpol-e Zahab
- Bakhsh: Central
- Rural District: Howmeh-ye Sarpol

Population (2006)
  - Total: 119
- Time zone: UTC+3:30 (IRST)
  - Summer (DST): UTC+4:30 (IRDT)

Salman Tappeh (Persian: سلمان تپه, also Romanized as Salmān Tappeh) is a village in Howmeh-ye Sarpol Rural District, in the Central District of Sarpol-e Zahab County, Kermanshah Province, Iran. At the 2006 census, its population was 119, in 20 families.
