= Javanmiri-ye Olya =

Javanmiri-ye Olya جوانميرئ عليا
- Village
- Country: Iran
- Province: Kermanshah
- County: Sarpol-e Zahab
- Bakhsh: Central
- Rural District: Posht Tang

Population (2006)
  - Total: 207
- Time zone: UTC+3:30 (IRST)
  - Summer (DST): UTC+4:30 (IRDT)

Javanmiri-ye Olya (Persian: جوانميرئ عليا, also Romanized as Javānmīrī-ye ‘Olyā) is a village in Posht Tang Rural District, in the Central District of Sarpol-e Zahab County, Kermanshah Province, Iran. At the 2006 census, its population was 207, in 36 families.
