= Darvand, Sarpol-e Zahab =

Village in Kermanshah, Iran

Darvand داروند
- Village
- Location within Iran
- Coordinates: 34°21′00″N 45°51′00″E
- Country: Iran
- Province: Kermanshah
- County: Sarpol-e Zahab
- Bakhsh: Central
- Rural District: Beshiva Pataq

Population (2006)
  - Total: 164
- Time zone: UTC+3:30 (IRST)
  - Summer (DST): UTC+4:30 (IRDT)

Darvand (Persian: داروند, also Romanized as Dārvand; also known as Dārvan, Qala Darwand, Sher Kush, and Shīr Kosh) is a village in Beshiva Pataq Rural District, in the Central District of Sarpol-e Zahab County, Kermanshah Province, Iran. At the 2006 census, its population was 164, in 37 families.
