= Tappeh Rash Kalashi =

Tappeh Rash Kalashi تپه رش كلاشي
- Village
- Country: Iran
- Province: Kermanshah
- County: Sarpol-e Zahab
- Bakhsh: Central
- Rural District: Howmeh-ye Sarpol

Population (2006)
  - Total: 750
- Time zone: UTC+3:30 (IRST)
  - Summer (DST): UTC+4:30 (IRDT)

Tappeh Rash Kalashi (Persian: تپه رش كلاشي, also Romanized as Tappeh Rash Kalāshī) is a village in Howmeh-ye Sarpol Rural District, in the Central District of Sarpol-e Zahab County, Kermanshah Province, Iran. At the 2006 census, its population was 750, in 157 families.
