= Gelam Kabud =

Gelam Kabud or Golom Kabud (Persian: گلم كبود) may refer to:

- Golom Kabud, Kermanshah
- Gelam Kabud, Lorestan

== See also ==
- Golam Kabud (disambiguation)
