= Dul-e Elyas =

Dul-e Elyas دول الياس
- Village
- Location within Iran
- Coordinates: 34°29′04″N 45°51′55″E
- Country: Iran
- Province: Kermanshah
- County: Sarpol-e Zahab
- Bakhsh: Central
- Rural District: Howmeh-ye Sarpol

Population (2006)
  - Total: 133
- Time zone: UTC+3:30 (IRST)
  - Summer (DST): UTC+4:30 (IRDT)

Dul-e Elyas (Persian: دول الياس, also Romanized as Dūl-e Elyās) is a village in Howmeh-ye Sarpol Rural District, in the Central District of Sarpol-e Zahab County, Kermanshah Province, Iran. At the 2006 census, its population was 133, in 28 households.
