= Lavasani, Iran =

Lavasani لواساني
- Village
- Location within Iran
- Coordinates: 34°21′01″N 45°58′39″E
- Country: Iran
- Province: Kermanshah
- County: Sarpol-e Zahab
- Bakhsh: Central
- Rural District: Qaleh Shahin

Population (2006)
  - Total: 244
- Time zone: UTC+3:30 (IRST)
  - Summer (DST): UTC+4:30 (IRDT)

Lavasani (Persian: لواساني, also Romanized as Lavāsānī; also known as Ḩājjī Shahbāz Khān) is a village in Qaleh Shahin Rural District, in the Central District of Sarpol-e Zahab County, Kermanshah Province, Iran. At the 2006 census, its population was 244, in 49 families.
