= Tappeh Azimeh =

Tappeh Azimeh تپه عظيمه
- Village
- Location within Iran
- Coordinates: 34°24′36″N 45°52′35″E
- Country: Iran
- Province: Kermanshah
- County: Sarpol-e Zahab
- Bakhsh: Central
- Rural District: Qaleh Shahin

Population (2006)
  - Total: 152
- Time zone: UTC+3:30 (IRST)
  - Summer (DST): UTC+4:30 (IRDT)

Tappeh Azimeh (Persian: تپه عظيمه, also romanized as Tappeh ‘Az̧īmeh and Tappeh-ye ‘Az̧īmeh) is a village in Qaleh Shahin Rural District, in the Central District of Sarpol-e Zahab County, Kermanshah Province, Iran. At the 2006 census, its population was 152, divided into 33 families.
