= Barzelak =

Barzelak برزلك
- Village
- Location within Iran
- Coordinates: 34°26′46″N 45°56′32″E
- Country: Iran
- Province: Kermanshah
- County: Sarpol-e Zahab
- Bakhsh: Central
- Rural District: Beshiva Pataq

Population (2006)
  - Total: 103
- Time zone: UTC+3:30 (IRST)
  - Summer (DST): UTC+4:30 (IRDT)

Barzelak (Persian: برزلك, also Romanized as Barzaleh, Barzeh Lak, and Barzeleh) is a village in Beshiva Pataq Rural District, in the Central District of Sarpol-e Zahab County, Kermanshah Province, Iran. At the 2006 census, its population was 103, in 24 families.
