= Qaleh Sefid-e Sofla, Kermanshah =

Village in Kermanshah, Iran

Qaleh Sefid-e Sofla قلعه سفيد سفلي
- Village
- Location within Iran
- Coordinates: 34°22′16″N 45°55′38″E
- Country: Iran
- Province: Kermanshah
- County: Sarpol-e Zahab
- Bakhsh: Central
- Rural District: Qaleh Shahin

Population (2006)
  - Total: 207
- Time zone: UTC+3:30 (IRST)
  - Summer (DST): UTC+4:30 (IRDT)

Qaleh Sefid-e Sofla (Persian: قلعه سفيد سفلي, also Romanized as Qal‘eh Sefīd-e Soflá; also known as Qal‘eh Sefīd-e Pā’īn) is a village in Qaleh Shahin Rural District, in the Central District of Sarpol-e Zahab County, Kermanshah Province, Iran. At the 2006 census, its population was 207, in 46 families.
