= Tappeh Kabud, Sarpol-e Zahab =

Village in Kermanshah province, Iran

Tappeh Kabud Persian: تپه كبود
- Village
- Location within Iran
- Coordinates: 34°40′55″N 45°49′54″E
- Country: Iran
- Province: Kermanshah
- County: Sarpol-e Zahab
- District: Dasht-e Zahab
- Rural District: Jeygaran

Population (2016)
  - Total: 146
- Time zone: UTC+3:30 (IRST)

Tappeh Kabud (Persian: تپه كبود) (Note: Also romanized as Tappeh Kabūd; also known as Tappeh Kabūd-e Bālā) is a village in Jeygaran Rural District of Dasht-e Zahab District, Sarpol-e Zahab County, Kermanshah province, Iran.

== Demographics ==
=== Population ===
At the time of the 2006 National Census, the village's population was 33 in 7 households, when it was in Ezgeleh District of Salas-e Babajani County. The following census in 2011 counted 35 people in 10 households. The 2016 census measured the population of the village as 146 people in 35 households, by which time the rural district had been transferred to the Central District of Sarpol-e Zahab County. It was the most populous village in its rural district.

After the 2016 census, the rural district was separated from the district in the formation of Dasht-e Zahab District.
