= Gardeh Now =

Village in Kermanshah province, Iran

Gardeh Now Persian: گرده نو
- Village
- Location within Iran
- Coordinates: 34°42′52″N 45°48′38″E
- Country: Iran
- Province: Kermanshah
- County: Sarpol-e Zahab
- District: Dasht-e Zahab
- Rural District: Jeygaran

Population (2016)
  - Total: 127
- Time zone: UTC+3:30 (IRST)

Gardeh Now (Persian: گرده نو) (Note: Also known as Gardanū and Kardeh Now) is a village in, and the capital of, Jeygaran Rural District of Dasht-e Zahab District, Sarpol-e Zahab County, Kermanshah province, Iran.

== Demographics ==
=== Population ===
At the time of the 2006 National Census, the village's population was 148 in 34 households, when it was in Ezgeleh District of Salas-e Babajani County. The following census in 2011 counted 793 people in 50 households, The 2016 census measured the population of the village as 127 people in 31 households, by which time the rural district had been transferred to the Central District of Sarpol-e Zahab County.

After the 2016 census, the rural district was separated from the district in the formation of Dasht-e Zahab District.
