= Quchi Bashi =

Quchi Bashi قوچي باشي
- Village
- Location within Iran
- Coordinates: 34°31′25″N 45°54′24″E
- Country: Iran
- Province: Kermanshah
- County: Sarpol-e Zahab
- Bakhsh: Central
- Rural District: Howmeh-ye Sarpol

Population (2006)
  - Total: 179
- Time zone: UTC+3:30 (IRST)
  - Summer (DST): UTC+4:30 (IRDT)

Quchi Bashi (Persian: قوچي باشي, also Romanized as Qūchī Bāshī; also known as Kānī ‘Āzīz-e Qūshī Bāshī and Qūjī Bāshī) is a village in Howmeh-ye Sarpol Rural District, in the Central District of Sarpol-e Zahab County, Kermanshah Province, Iran. At the 2006 census, its population was 179, in 34 families.
