= Asiab Qermez =

Asiab Qermez اسياب قرمز
- Village
- Location within Iran
- Coordinates: 34°25′53″N 45°53′16″E
- Country: Iran
- Province: Kermanshah
- County: Sarpol-e Zahab
- Bakhsh: Central
- Rural District: Qaleh Shahin

Population (2006)
  - Total: 146
- Time zone: UTC+3:30 (IRST)
  - Summer (DST): UTC+4:30 (IRDT)

Asiab Qermez (Persian: اسياب قرمز, also Romanized as Āsīāb Qermez) is a village in Qaleh Shahin Rural District, in the Central District of Sarpol-e Zahab County, Kermanshah Province, Iran. At the 2006 census, its population was 146, in 32 families.
