= Tal Khalvati-ye Qader Rahman =

Tal Khalvati-ye Qader Rahman تل خلوتي قادررحمان
- Village
- Location within Iran
- Coordinates: 34°38′00″N 46°02′00″E
- Country: Iran
- Province: Kermanshah
- County: Sarpol-e Zahab
- Bakhsh: Central
- Rural District: Posht Tang

Population (2006)
  - Total: 73
- Time zone: UTC+3:30 (IRST)
  - Summer (DST): UTC+4:30 (IRDT)

Tal Khalvati-ye Qader Rahman (Persian: تل خلوتي قادررحمان, also Romanized as Tal Khalvatī-ye Qāder Raḩmān) is a village in Posht Tang Rural District, in the Central District of Sarpol-e Zahab County, Kermanshah Province, Iran. At the 2006 census, its population was 73, in 16 families.
