= Mahki (disambiguation) =

Mahki is a village in Lorestan Province, Iran.

Mahki or Mahaki (Persian: مهكي) may also refer to:

- Mahaki Amin Beyg, Kermanshah Province
- Mahaki Naser, Kermanshah Province
- Mahki Pol Mahi, Kermanshah Province
- Mahaki dialect, a Southern Kurdish dialect
