= Ramaki-ye Ramezan =

Ramaki-ye Ramezan رمكي رمضان
- Village
- Location within Iran
- Coordinates: 34°35′22″N 45°57′23″E
- Country: Iran
- Province: Kermanshah
- County: Sarpol-e Zahab
- Bakhsh: Central
- Rural District: Posht Tang

Population (2006)
  - Total: 722
- Time zone: UTC+3:30 (IRST)
  - Summer (DST): UTC+4:30 (IRDT)

Ramaki-ye Ramezan (Persian: رمكي رمضان, also Romanized as Ramakī-ye Ramez̤ān; also known as Ramakī-ye ‘Olyā) is a village in Posht Tang Rural District, in the Central District of Sarpol-e Zahab County, Kermanshah Province, Iran. At the 2006 census, its population was 722, in 127 families.
