= Tappeh Rash, Sarpol-e Zahab =

Village in Kermanshah province, Iran

Tappeh Rash Persian: تپه رش
- Village
- Location within Iran
- Coordinates: 34°44′24″N 45°43′40″E
- Country: Iran
- Province: Kermanshah
- County: Sarpol-e Zahab
- District: Dasht-e Zahab
- Rural District: Sarqaleh

Population (2016)
  - Total: 58
- Time zone: UTC+3:30 (IRST)

Tappeh Rash (Persian: تپه رش) (Note: Also known as Kal-e Taktak and Taqtaq) is a village in, and the capital of, Sarqaleh Rural District of Dasht-e Zahab District, Sarpol-e Zahab County, Kermanshah province, Iran.

== Demographics ==
=== Population ===
At the time of the 2006 National Census, the village's population was 91 in 20 households, when it was in Ezgeleh District of Salas-e Babajani County. The following census in 2011 counted 134 people in 34 households. The 2016 census measured the population of the village as 58 people in 16 households, by which time the rural district had been transferred to the Central District of Sarpol-e Zahab County.

After the 2016 census, the rural district was separated from the district in the formation of Dasht-e Zahab District.
