= Dangi, Iran (disambiguation) =

Dangi, Iran is a village in Kermanshah Province, Iran.

Dangi or Dengi (Persian: دنگي) in Iran may also refer to:

- Dangi-ye Abbas
- Dangi-ye Ali Beyg
- Dangi-ye Kak Abdollah
