= Pavenar =

Pavenar پاونار
- Village
- Location within Iran
- Coordinates: 34°27′09″N 45°50′30″E
- Country: Iran
- Province: Kermanshah
- County: Sarpol-e Zahab
- Bakhsh: Central
- Rural District: Howmeh-ye Sarpol

Population (2006)
  - Total: 446
- Time zone: UTC+3:30 (IRST)
  - Summer (DST): UTC+4:30 (IRDT)

Pavenar (Persian: پاونار, also Romanized as Pāvenār) is a village in Howmeh-ye Sarpol Rural District, in the Central District of Sarpol-e Zahab County, Kermanshah province, Iran. At the 2006 census, its population was 446, in 102 families.

Pavenar is a village situated in the western region of Iran, specifically in the Qada' Bayji area of Ostan-e Kermanshah. It is located 83 kilometers to the west of Ostan-e Kermanshah. One of the notable attractions in Pavenar is the sculpture "Man in a Case". While there are not many tourist attractions in Pavenar itself, there are several popular destinations in the surrounding areas. Pavenar has been included in the list of TOP-100 tourist attractions in Iran.
