= Mohammad Ali Qoregah =

Mohammad Ali Qoregah محمدعلي قرگه
- Village
- Location within Iran
- Coordinates: 34°24′54″N 45°57′50″E
- Country: Iran
- Province: Kermanshah
- County: Sarpol-e Zahab
- Bakhsh: Central
- Rural District: Beshiva Pataq

Population (2006)
  - Total: 69
- Time zone: UTC+3:30 (IRST)
  - Summer (DST): UTC+4:30 (IRDT)

Mohammad Ali Qoregah (Persian: محمدعلي قرگه, also Romanized as Moḩammad ‘Alī Qoregah) is a village in Beshiva Pataq Rural District, in the Central District of Sarpol-e Zahab County, Kermanshah Province, Iran. At the 2006 census, its population was 69, in 18 families.
