= Kushkari-ye Namdar =

Kushkari-ye Namdar كوشكري نامدار
- Village
- Country: Iran
- Province: Kermanshah
- County: Sarpol-e Zahab
- Bakhsh: Central
- Rural District: Dasht-e Zahab

Population (2006)
  - Total: 115
- Time zone: UTC+3:30 (IRST)
  - Summer (DST): UTC+4:30 (IRDT)

Kushkari-ye Namdar (Persian: كوشكري نامدار, also Romanized as Kūshkarī-ye Nāmdār) is a village in Dasht-e Zahab Rural District, Central District, Sarpol-e Zahab County, Kermanshah Province, Iran. At the 2006 census, its population was 115, in 23 families.
