= Chalekah =

Chalekah چالكه
- Village
- Location within Iran
- Coordinates: 34°26′44″N 45°55′53″E
- Country: Iran
- Province: Kermanshah
- County: Sarpol-e Zahab
- Bakhsh: Central
- Rural District: Beshiva Pataq

Population (2006)
  - Total: 299
- Time zone: UTC+3:30 (IRST)
  - Summer (DST): UTC+4:30 (IRDT)

Chalekah (Persian: چالكه, also Romanized as Chālekah; also known as Chālegah) is a village in Beshiva Pataq Rural District, in the Central District of Sarpol-e Zahab County, Kermanshah Province, Iran. At the 2006 census, its population was 299, in 66 families.
