= Rezalak =

Rezalak رضالك
- Village
- Location within Iran
- Coordinates: 34°27′04″N 45°53′44″E
- Country: Iran
- Province: Kermanshah
- County: Sarpol-e Zahab
- Bakhsh: Central
- Rural District: Beshiva Pataq

Population (2006)
  - Total: 197
- Time zone: UTC+3:30 (IRST)
  - Summer (DST): UTC+4:30 (IRDT)

Rezalak (Persian: رضالك, also Romanized as Reẕālak; also known as ‘Alī Gardeh and ‘Alī Gerdeh) is a village in Beshiva Pataq Rural District, in the Central District of Sarpol-e Zahab County, Kermanshah Province, Iran. At the 2006 census, its population was 197, in 43 families.
