= Taesheh Mahmud Nazari =

Taesheh Mahmud Nazari طايشه محمود نظري
- Village
- Location within Iran
- Coordinates: 34°36′45″N 45°47′11″E
- Country: Iran
- Province: Kermanshah
- County: Sarpol-e Zahab
- Bakhsh: Central
- Rural District: Dasht-e Zahab

Population (2006)
  - Total: 412
- Time zone: UTC+3:30 (IRST)
  - Summer (DST): UTC+4:30 (IRDT)

Taesheh Mahmud Nazari (Persian: طايشه محمود نظري, also Romanized as Ta’esheh Maḩmūd Nazarī; also known as Ţā’esheh Maḩmūd, Talesheh Mahmood Nazarī, Tayesheh-Ye-Mahmūd, and Ţāyesh‘ī) is a village in Dasht-e Zahab Rural District, in the Central District of Sarpol-e Zahab County, Kermanshah Province, Iran. At the 2006 census, its population was 412, in 80 families.
