= Tarkeh Veys =

Village in Kermanshah province, Iran

Tarkeh Veys Persian: تركه ويس
- Village
- Location within Iran
- Coordinates: 34°23′21″N 45°56′43″E
- Country: Iran
- Province: Kermanshah
- County: Sarpol-e Zahab
- District: Qaleh Shahin
- Rural District: Qaleh Shahin

Population (2016)
  - Total: 252
- Time zone: UTC+3:30 (IRST)

Tarkeh Veys (Persian: تركه ويس) (Note: Also known as Tark Veys, Tark-e Veys, and Tork Veys) is a village in, and the capital of, Qaleh Shahin Rural District of Qaleh Shahin District, Sarpol-e Zahab County, Kermanshah province, Iran.

== Demographics ==
=== Population ===
At the time of the 2006 National Census, the village's population was 378 in 94 households, when it was in the Central District. The following census in 2011 counted 301 people in 78 households. The 2016 census measured the population of the village as 252 people in 80 households, by which time the rural district had been separated from the district in the formation of Qaleh Shahin District.
