= Kafru Salman =

Kafru Salman كفروسلمان
- Village
- Location within Iran
- Coordinates: 34°37′29″N 45°58′01″E
- Country: Iran
- Province: Kermanshah
- County: Sarpol-e Zahab
- Bakhsh: Central
- Rural District: Posht Tang

Population (2006)
  - Total: 192
- Time zone: UTC+3:30 (IRST)
  - Summer (DST): UTC+4:30 (IRDT)

Kafru Salman (Persian: كفروسلمان, also Romanized as Kafrū Salmān; also known as Kafreh-e Salmān) is a village in Posht Tang Rural District, in the Central District of Sarpol-e Zahab County, Kermanshah Province, Iran. At the 2006 census, its population was 192, in 41 families.
