= Majrilan =

Majrilan مجري لان
- Village
- Location within Iran
- Coordinates: 34°34′00″N 45°45′00″E
- Country: Iran
- Province: Kermanshah
- County: Sarpol-e Zahab
- Bakhsh: Central
- Rural District: Dasht-e Zahab

Population (2006)
  - Total: 116
- Time zone: UTC+3:30 (IRST)
  - Summer (DST): UTC+4:30 (IRDT)

Majrilan (Persian: مجري لان, also Romanized as Majrīlān; also known as Majrūlān) is a village in Dasht-e Zahab Rural District, in the Central District of Sarpol-e Zahab County, Kermanshah Province, Iran. At the 2006 census, its population was 116, in 26 families.
