= Qaraviz =

Qaraviz قراويز
- Village
- Location within Iran
- Coordinates: 34°30′09″N 45°47′17″E
- Country: Iran
- Province: Kermanshah
- County: Sarpol-e Zahab
- Bakhsh: Central
- Rural District: Howmeh-ye Sarpol

Population (2006)
  - Total: 398
- Time zone: UTC+3:30 (IRST)
  - Summer (DST): UTC+4:30 (IRDT)

Qaraviz (Persian: قراويز, also Romanized as Qarāvīz) is a village in Howmeh-ye Sarpol Rural District, in the Central District of Sarpol-e Zahab County, Kermanshah Province, Iran. At the 2006 census, its population was 398, in 86 families.
