= Farmayisheh Allah Nazer =

Farmayisheh Allah Nazer فرمايشه اله نظر
- Village
- Country: Iran
- Province: Kermanshah
- County: Sarpol-e Zahab
- Bakhsh: Central
- Rural District: Posht Tang

Population (2006)
  - Total: 179
- Time zone: UTC+3:30 (IRST)
  - Summer (DST): UTC+4:30 (IRDT)

Farmayisheh Allah Nazer (Persian: فرمايشه اله نظر, also Romanized as Farmāyīsheh Allah Naẓer) is a village in Posht Tang Rural District, in the Central District of Sarpol-e Zahab County, Kermanshah Province, Iran. At the 2006 census, its population was 179, in 31 families.
