= Baba Eskandar =

Baba Eskandar بابااسكندر
- Village
- Location within Iran
- Coordinates: 34°28′18″N 45°48′22″E
- Country: Iran
- Province: Kermanshah
- County: Sarpol-e Zahab
- Bakhsh: Central
- Rural District: Howmeh-ye Sarpol

Population (2006)
  - Total: 256
- Time zone: UTC+3:30 (IRST)
  - Summer (DST): UTC+4:30 (IRDT)

Baba Eskandar (Persian: بابااسكندر, also Romanized as Bābā Eskandar) is a village in Howmeh-ye Sarpol Rural District, in the Central District of Sarpol-e Zahab County, Kermanshah Province, Iran. At the 2006 census, its population was 256, in 61 families.
