= Tappeh Kanan =

Village in Kermanshah province, Iran

Tappeh Kanan Persian: تپه كنعان
- Village
- Location within Iran
- Coordinates: 34°42′55″N 45°43′43″E
- Country: Iran
- Province: Kermanshah
- County: Sarpol-e Zahab
- District: Dasht-e Zahab
- Rural District: Sarqaleh

Population (2016)
  - Total: 106
- Time zone: UTC+3:30 (IRST)

Tappeh Kanan (Persian: تپه كنعان) (Note: Also romanized as Tappeh Kan‘ān) is a village in Sarqaleh Rural District of Dasht-e Zahab District, Sarpol-e Zahab County, Kermanshah province, Iran.

== Demographics ==
=== Population ===
At the time of the 2006 National Census, the village's population was 98 in 15 households, when it was in Ezgeleh District of Salas-e Babajani County. The following census in 2011 counted 105 people in 23 households. The 2016 census measured the population of the village as 106 people in 25 households, by which time the rural district had been transferred to the Central District of Sarpol-e Zahab County. It was the most populous village in its rural district.

After the 2016 census, the rural district was separated from the district in the formation of Dasht-e Zahab District.
