= Sarzal-e Vali Nazeri =

Sarzal-e Vali Nazeri سرزل والي نظري
- Village
- Location within Iran
- Coordinates: 34°38′25″N 45°57′15″E
- Country: Iran
- Province: Kermanshah
- County: Sarpol-e Zahab
- Bakhsh: Central
- Rural District: Posht Tang

Population (2006)
  - Total: 129
- Time zone: UTC+3:30 (IRST)
  - Summer (DST): UTC+4:30 (IRDT)

Sarzal-e Vali Nazeri (Persian: سرزل والي نظري, also Romanized as Sarzal-e Vālī Naẓerī; also known as Sarzal) is a village in Posht Tang Rural District, in the Central District of Sarpol-e Zahab County, Kermanshah Province, Iran. At the 2006 census, its population was 129, in 26 families.
