= Qolkhanchek-e Shah Tutiya =

Qolkhanchek-e Shah Tutiya قلخانچك شاه طوطيا
- Village
- Location within Iran
- Coordinates: 34°32′17″N 45°47′10″E
- Country: Iran
- Province: Kermanshah
- County: Sarpol-e Zahab
- Bakhsh: Central
- Rural District: Dasht-e Zahab

Population (2006)
  - Total: 140
- Time zone: UTC+3:30 (IRST)
  - Summer (DST): UTC+4:30 (IRDT)

Qolkhanchek-e Shah Tutiya (Persian: قلخانچك شاه طوطيا, also romanized as Qolkhānchek-e Shāh Ţūṭīyā; also known as Falkhānjak-e Soflá, Qalkhānchak, and Qolkhānchek) is a village in Dasht-e Zahab Rural District, in the Central District of Sarpol-e Zahab County, Kermanshah Province, Iran. In the 2006 census, its population was 140, in 28 families.
