= Qaleh Zehab =

Qaleh Zehab قلعه ذهاب
- Village
- Country: Iran
- Province: Kermanshah
- County: Sarpol-e Zahab
- Bakhsh: Central
- Rural District: Dasht-e Zahab

Population (2006)
  - Total: 296
- Time zone: UTC+3:30 (IRST)
  - Summer (DST): UTC+4:30 (IRDT)

Qaleh Zehab (Persian: قلعه ذهاب, also Romanized as Qal‘eh Ẕehāb) is a village in Dasht-e Zahab Rural District, in the Central District of Sarpol-e Zahab County, Kermanshah Province, Iran. At the 2006 census, its population was 296, in 56 families.
