= Javanmiri =

Javanmiri جوانميري
- Village
- Location within Iran
- Coordinates: 34°35′55″N 45°57′52″E
- Country: Iran
- Province: Kermanshah
- County: Sarpol-e Zahab
- Bakhsh: Central
- Rural District: Posht Tang

Population (2006)
  - Total: 190
- Time zone: UTC+3:30 (IRST)
  - Summer (DST): UTC+4:30 (IRDT)

Javanmiri (Persian: جوانميري, also Romanized as Javānmīrī) is a village in Posht Tang Rural District, in the Central District of Sarpol-e Zahab County, Kermanshah Province, Iran. At the 2006 census, its population was 190, in 33 families.
