= Jenan =

Coordinates: 34.6158°N 45.9617°E

Jenan جنان
- Village
- Interactive map of Jenan
- Country: Iran
- Province: Kermanshah
- County: Sarpol-e Zahab
- Bakhsh: Central
- Rural District: Posht Tang

Population (2006)
  - Total: 53
- Time zone: UTC+3:30 (IRST)
  - Summer (DST): UTC+4:30 (IRDT)

Jenan (Persian: جنان, also Romanized as Jenān) is a village in Posht Tang Rural District, in the Central District of Sarpol-e Zahab County, Kermanshah Province, Iran. At the 2006 census, its population was 53, in 11 families.
