= Mivali =

Mivali or Meyvoli (Persian: ميولي) may refer to:

- Mivali-ye Darab Khan
- Mivali-ye Sofla
- Mivali Shirkhan
