= Maleh Dizgeh =

Maleh Dizgeh مله ديزگه
- Village
- Location within Iran
- Coordinates: 34°39′34″N 45°50′05″E
- Country: Iran
- Province: Kermanshah
- County: Sarpol-e Zahab
- Bakhsh: Central
- Rural District: Dasht-e Zahab

Population (2006)
  - Total: 129
- Time zone: UTC+3:30 (IRST)
  - Summer (DST): UTC+4:30 (IRDT)

Maleh Dizgeh (Persian: مله ديزگه, also Romanized as Maleh Dīzgeh; also known as Maleh Dazgeh and Maleh Dezgeh) is a village in Dasht-e Zahab Rural District, in the Central District of Sarpol-e Zahab County, Kermanshah Province, Iran. At the 2006 census, its population was 129, in 32 families.
