= Bozmirabad =

Village in Kermanshah province, Iran

Bozmirabad Persian: بزميراباد
- Village
- Location within Iran
- Coordinates: 34°36′45″N 45°59′32″E
- Country: Iran
- Province: Kermanshah
- County: Sarpol-e Zahab
- District: Dasht-e Zahab
- Rural District: Posht Tang

Population (2016)
  - Total: 1,111
- Time zone: UTC+3:30 (IRST)

Bozmirabad (Persian: بزميراباد) (Note: Also romanized as Bazmīrābād, Bezmīrābād, Bozmīr Ābād, and Bozmīrābād; also known as Bīzmarābād) is a village in, and the capital of, Posht Tang Rural District of Dasht-e Zahab District, Sarpol-e Zahab County, Kermanshah province, Iran.

== Demographics ==
=== Ethnicity ===
The village is populated by Kurds.

=== Population ===
At the time of the 2006 National Census, the village's population was 1,033 in 192 households, when it was in the Central District. The following census in 2011 counted 1,231 people in 291 households. The 2016 census measured the population of the village as 1,111 people in 282 households. It was the most populous village in its rural district.

After the 2016 census, the rural district was separated from the district in the formation of Dasht-e Zahab District.
