= Majid Qaleh Parvar =

Majid Qaleh Parvar مجيدقلعه پرور
- Village
- Location within Iran
- Coordinates: 34°32′25″N 45°51′51″E
- Country: Iran
- Province: Kermanshah
- County: Sarpol-e Zahab
- Bakhsh: Central
- Rural District: Howmeh-ye Sarpol

Population (2006)
  - Total: 22
- Time zone: UTC+3:30 (IRST)
  - Summer (DST): UTC+4:30 (IRDT)

Majid Qaleh Parvar (Persian: مجيدقلعه پرور, also Romanized as Majīd Qal‘eh Parvar; also known as Qal‘eh Parvar) is a village in Howmeh-ye Sarpol Rural District, in the Central District of Sarpol-e Zahab County, Kermanshah Province, Iran. At the 2006 census, its population was 22, in 5 families.
