= Habib (disambiguation) =

Habib is an Arabic masculine given name, occasional surname, and honorific.

Habib may also refer to:

- Habib (actor), Pakistani actor, director and producer
- Habib (angel), an angel mentioned in Muhammad's Night Journey narrative
- Habib (singer), Iranian singer, songwriter, musician and composer
- Habib, Iran, a village in Kermanshah province, Iran
- Habib's, a Brazilian fast food company

== See also ==
- Al-Habib (disambiguation)
