= Bi Bayan =

Bi Bayan بي بيان
- Village
- Location within Iran
- Coordinates: 34°38′12″N 45°50′02″E
- Country: Iran
- Province: Kermanshah
- County: Sarpol-e Zahab
- Bakhsh: Central
- Rural District: Dasht-e Zahab

Population (2006)
  - Total: 282
- Time zone: UTC+3:30 (IRST)
  - Summer (DST): UTC+4:30 (IRDT)

Bi Bayan (Persian: بي بيان, also Romanized as Bī Bayān; also known as Bī Bayānī, Bībeyānī, and Bībīānī) is a village in Dasht-e Zahab Rural District, in the Central District of Sarpol-e Zahab County, Kermanshah Province, Iran. At the 2006 census, its population was 282, in 52 families.
