= Kelineh =

Kelineh - kolineh كلينه
- Village
- Location within Iran
- Coordinates: 34°31′28″N 45°51′54″E
- Country: Iran
- Province: Kermanshah
- County: Sarpol-e Zahab
- Bakhsh: Central
- Rural District: Howmeh-ye Sarpol

Population (2006)
  - Total: 117
- Time zone: UTC+3:30 (IRST)
  - Summer (DST): UTC+4:30 (IRDT)

Kelineh (Persian: كلينه, also Romanized as Kelīneh and Kolīneh) is a village in Howmeh-ye Sarpol Rural District, in the Central District of Sarpol-e Zahab County, Kermanshah Province, Iran. At the 2006 census, its population was 117, in 30 families.
