= Mahaki Naser =

Mahaki Naser مهكي ناصر
- Village
- Location within Iran
- Coordinates: 34°25′34″N 45°56′10″E
- Country: Iran
- Province: Kermanshah
- County: Sarpol-e Zahab
- Bakhsh: Central
- Rural District: Beshiva Pataq

Population (2006)
  - Total: 155
- Time zone: UTC+3:30 (IRST)
  - Summer (DST): UTC+4:30 (IRDT)

Mahaki Naser (Persian: مهكي ناصر, also Romanized as Mahakī Nāşer; also known as Mahkī Mehranāt) is a village in Beshiva Pataq Rural District, in the Central District of Sarpol-e Zahab County, Kermanshah Province, Iran. At the 2006 census, its population was 155, in 38 families.
