= Rashid Abbas =

Rashid Abbas رشيدعباس
- Village
- Location within Iran
- Coordinates: 34°28′26″N 45°52′13″E
- Country: Iran
- Province: Kermanshah
- County: Sarpol-e Zahab
- Bakhsh: Central
- Rural District: Howmeh-ye Sarpol

Population (2006)
  - Total: 170
- Time zone: UTC+3:30 (IRST)
  - Summer (DST): UTC+4:30 (IRDT)

Rashid Abbas (Persian: رشيدعباس, also Romanized as Rashīd ‘Abbās; also known as Rashīd ‘Abbāsī and Rashīd ‘Abbāst) is a village in Howmeh-ye Sarpol Rural District, in the Central District of Sarpol-e Zahab County, Kermanshah Province, Iran. At the 2006 census, its population was 170, in 37 families. Rashid Abbas has completed his master's degree in mechanical engineering with business from University of Melbourne, magna cum laude.
