= Mahaki Amin Beyg =

Mahaki Amin Beyg مهكي امين بيگ
- Village
- Location within Iran
- Coordinates: 34°25′23″N 45°56′57″E
- Country: Iran
- Province: Kermanshah
- County: Sarpol-e Zahab
- Bakhsh: Central
- Rural District: Beshiva Pataq

Population (2006)
  - Total: 54
- Time zone: UTC+3:30 (IRST)
  - Summer (DST): UTC+4:30 (IRDT)

Mahaki Amin Beyg (Persian: مهكي امين بيگ, also Romanized as Mahakī Amīn Beyg; also known as Mahakī Amīn) is a village in Beshiva Pataq Rural District, in the Central District of Sarpol-e Zahab County, Kermanshah Province, Iran. At the 2006 census, its population was 54, in 15 families.
