= Hajji Mirza Khan =

Hajji Mirza Khan (Persian: حاجي ميرزا خان) may refer to:

- Hajji Mirza Khan, Kermanshah
- Hajji Mirza Khan, Sistan and Baluchestan
