= Kalareh =

Kalareh (Persian: كلاره) may refer to:

- Kalareh-ye Mehrabi
- Kalareh-ye Zhaleh
