= Davazdah Emam, Kermanshah =

Village in Kermanshah province, Iran

Davazdah Emam Persian: دوازده امام
- Village
- Location within Iran
- Coordinates: 34°22′24″N 45°57′51″E
- Country: Iran
- Province: Kermanshah
- County: Sarpol-e Zahab
- District: Qaleh Shahin
- Rural District: Qaleh Shahin

Population (2016)
  - Total: 767
- Time zone: UTC+3:30 (IRST)

Davazdah Emam (Persian: دوازده امام) (Note: Also romanized as Davāzdah Emām) is a village in Qaleh Shahin Rural District of Qaleh Shahin District, Sarpol-e Zahab County, Kermanshah province, Iran, serving as capital of the district.

== Demographics ==
=== Population ===
At the time of the 2006 National Census, the village's population was 285 in 62 households, when it was in the Central District. The following census in 2011 counted 258 people in 71 households. The 2016 census measured the population of the village as 767 people in 211 households, by which time the rural district had been separated from the district in the establishment of Qaleh Shahin District. Davazdah Emam merged with the villages of Kah Sara and Qaleh Gelineh. It was the most populous village in its rural district.
