= Kalashi-ye Abdol Qader =

Kalashi-ye Abdol Qader كلاشي عبدالقادر
- Village
- Location within Iran
- Coordinates: 34°38′06″N 45°48′53″E
- Country: Iran
- Province: Kermanshah
- County: Sarpol-e Zahab
- Bakhsh: Central
- Rural District: Dasht-e Zahab

Population (2006)
  - Total: 262
- Time zone: UTC+3:30 (IRST)
  - Summer (DST): UTC+4:30 (IRDT)

Kalashi-ye Abdol Qader (Persian: كلاشي عبدالقادر, also Romanized as Kalāshī-ye ʿAbdol Qāder; also known as Kalāshī) is a village in Dasht-e Zahab Rural District, in the Central District of Sarpol-e Zahab County, Kermanshah Province, Iran. At the 2006 census, its population was 262, in 48 families.
