= Dulangan =

Dulangan (Persian: دولنگان), also rendered as Dolangan or Dulgan, may refer to:

- Dulangan-e Olya
- Dulangan-e Sofla
