= Rafi, Kermanshah =

Rafi رفيع
- Village
- Location within Iran
- Coordinates: 34°24′36″N 46°00′10″E
- Country: Iran
- Province: Kermanshah
- County: Sarpol-e Zahab
- Bakhsh: Central
- Rural District: Beshiva Pataq

Population (2006)
  - Total: 522
- Time zone: UTC+3:30 (IRST)
  - Summer (DST): UTC+4:30 (IRDT)

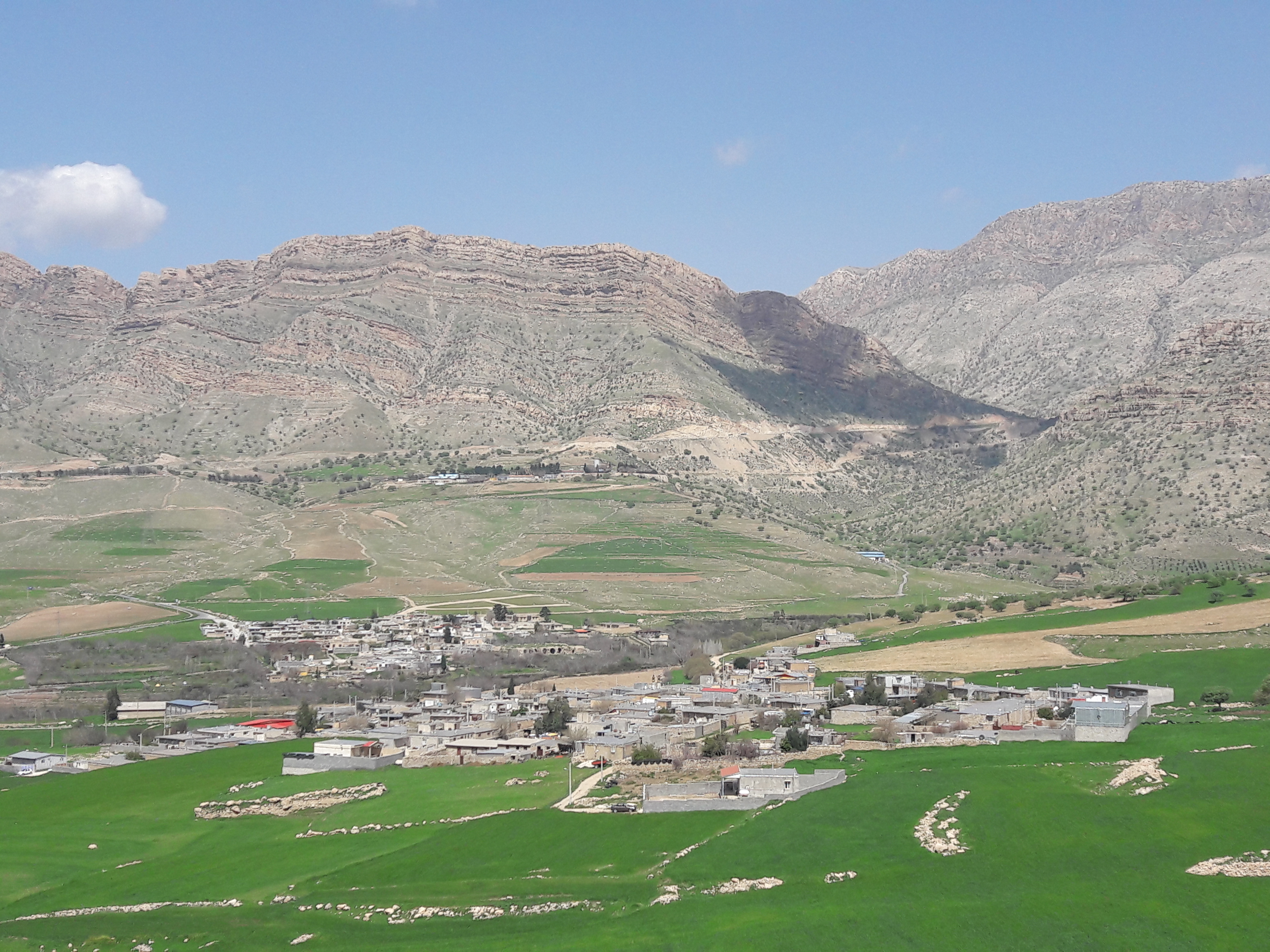

Rafi (Persian: رفيع, also Romanized as Rafī‘; also known as Qal‘eh Rafī‘) is a village in Beshiva Pataq Rural District, in the Central District of Sarpol-e Zahab County, Kermanshah Province, Iran. At the 2006 census, its population was 522, in 112 families.
