= Mivali Shirkhan =

Mivali Shirkhan ميولي شيرخان
- Village
- Location within Iran
- Coordinates: 34°36′36″N 45°56′30″E
- Country: Iran
- Province: Kermanshah
- County: Sarpol-e Zahab
- Bakhsh: Central
- Rural District: Posht Tang

Population (2006)
  - Total: 134
- Time zone: UTC+3:30 (IRST)
  - Summer (DST): UTC+4:30 (IRDT)

Mivali Shirkhan (Persian: ميولي شيرخان, also Romanized as Mīvalī Shīrkhān; also known as Mīr‘alī-ye Dārāb and Mīvalī-ye ‘Olyā) is a village in Posht Tang Rural District, in the Central District of Sarpol-e Zahab County, Kermanshah Province, Iran. At the 2006 census, its population was 134, in 27 families.
