= Kuik-e Mahmud =

Neighborhood in Kermanshah province, Iran

Kuik-e Mahmud Persian: كوئيك محمود
- Neighborhood
- Location within Iran
- Coordinates: 34°33′23″N 45°51′36″E
- Country: Iran
- Province: Kermanshah
- County: Sarpol-e Zahab
- District: Dasht-e Zahab
- Rural District: Dasht-e Zahab
- Village: Kuik

Population (2016)
  - Total: 222
- Time zone: UTC+3:30 (IRST)

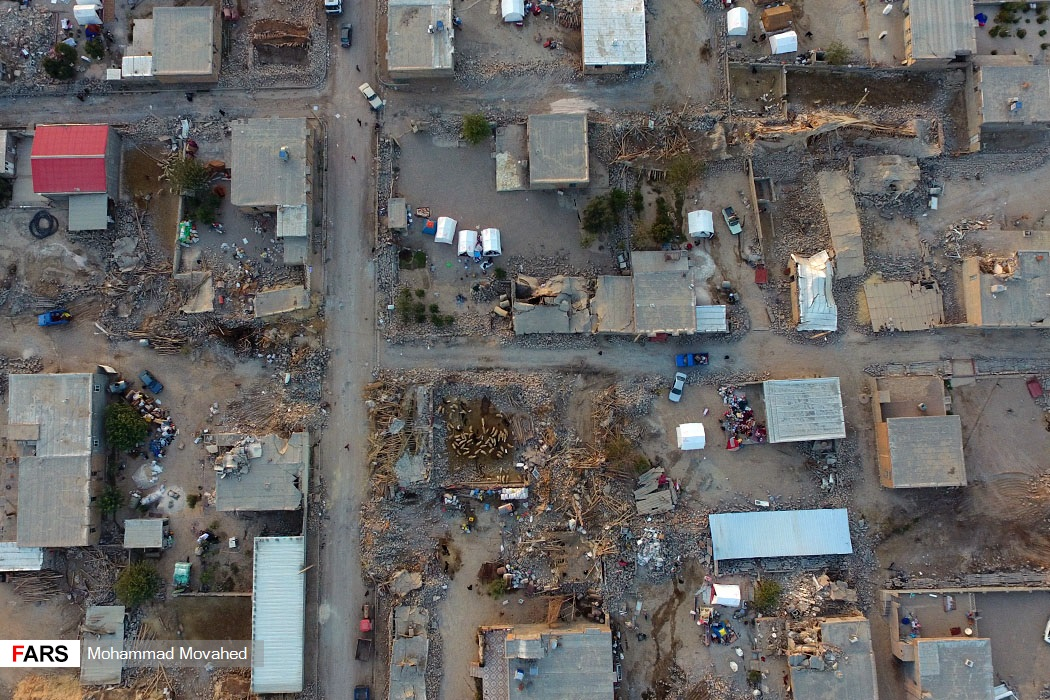

Kuik-e Mahmud (Persian: كوئيك محمود) (Note: Also romanized as Kū’īk-e Maḩmūd; also known as Kūyakī-ye Maḩmūd) is a neighborhood in the village of Kuik in Dasht-e Zahab Rural District of Dasht-e Zahab District in Sarpol-e Zahab County, Kermanshah province, Iran.

== Demographics ==
=== Population ===
At the time of the 2006 National Census, Kuik-e Mahmud's population was 202 in 36 households, when it was a village in the Central District. The following census in 2011 counted 216 people in 52 households. The 2016 census measured the population of the village as 222 people in 56 households.

After the census, the rural district was separated from the district in the formation of Dasht-e Zahab District. In addition, the villages of Kuik-e Azizi Amin, Kuik-e Hasan, Kuik-e Mahmud, and Kuik-e Majid were merged to form the village of Kuik.
