= Emam Abbas =

Emam Abbas (Persian: امام عباس) may refer to:

- Emam Abbas-e Olya
- Emam Abbas-e Sofla
