= Jalalvand-e Olya =

Jalalvand-e Olya جلالوندعليا
- Village
- Location within Iran
- Coordinates: 34°27′53″N 45°53′57″E
- Country: Iran
- Province: Kermanshah
- County: Sarpol-e Zahab
- Bakhsh: Central
- Rural District: Beshiva Pataq

Population (2006)
  - Total: 305
- Time zone: UTC+3:30 (IRST)
  - Summer (DST): UTC+4:30 (IRDT)

Jalalvand-e Olya (Persian: جلالوندعليا, also Romanized as Jalālvand-e ‘Olyā; also known as Jalālvand) is a village in Beshiva Pataq Rural District, in the Central District of Sarpol-e Zahab County, Kermanshah Province, Iran. At the 2006 census, its population was 305, in 72 families.
