= Dangi =

Dangi may refer to

- Dangi people, a Hindu farming caste native to northern India
- Dangi, Iran (disambiguation)
- Dangi language (disambiguation)
- Dangun years

== People with the surname ==
- Anand Singh Dangi, Indian politician, a member of the Haryana Legislative Assembly
- Chandra Bahadur Dangi (1939–2015), world's shortest verified person
- Dalichand Dangi, Indian politician, member of the Rajasthan Legislative Assembly
- Indira Dangi (born 1980), Indian novelist
- Purshottam Dangi, Indian politician, member of the Madhya Pradesh Legislative Assembly

== See also ==
- Dhangi, Indian name for a ship
