= Rashid Abbasi =

Rashid Abbasi (Persian: رشيدعباسي) may refer to:

- Qaleh Rashid Aqa
- Rashid Abbas
- Prince Saeed Rashid Abbasi
