= Galam Kabud-e Sofla, Sarpol-e Zahab =

Galam Kabud-e Sofla گلم كبودسفلي
- Village
- Country: Iran
- Province: Kermanshah
- County: Sarpol-e Zahab
- Bakhsh: Central
- Rural District: Howmeh-ye Sarpol

Population (2006)
  - Total: 112
- Time zone: UTC+3:30 (IRST)
  - Summer (DST): UTC+4:30 (IRDT)

Galam Kabud-e Sofla (Persian: گلم كبودسفلي, also Romanized as Galam Kabūd-e Soflá) is a village in Howmeh-ye Sarpol Rural District, in the Central District of Sarpol-e Zahab County, Kermanshah Province, Iran. At the 2006 census, its population was 112, in 23 families.
