= Dangi-ye Kak Abdollah =

Coordinates: 34°38′57″N 45°58′29″E

Dangi-ye Kak Abdollah دنگي كاك عبدالله
- Village
- Interactive map of Dangi-ye Kak Abdollah
- Country: Iran
- Province: Kermanshah
- County: Sarpol-e Zahab
- Bakhsh: Central
- Rural District: Posht Tang

Population (2006)
  - Total: 165
- Time zone: UTC+3:30 (IRST)
  - Summer (DST): UTC+4:30 (IRDT)

Dangi-ye Kak Abdollah (Persian: دنگي كاك عبدالله, also Romanized as Dangī-ye Kāk ʿAbdollah) is a village in Posht Tang Rural District, in the Central District of Sarpol-e Zahab County, Kermanshah Province, Iran. At the 2006 census, its population was 165, in 35 families.
