= Sarableh (disambiguation) =

Sarableh is a city in Ilam Province, Iran.

Sarableh or Sarabeleh or Sar Ableh (Persian: سرابله) may also refer to:

- Sarabeleh, Kermanshah
- Sarableh, Sarpol-e Zahab, Kermanshah Province
