= Dangi-ye Abbas =

Dangi-ye Abbas دنگي عباس
- Village
- Location within Iran
- Coordinates: 34°37′56″N 46°00′38″E
- Country: Iran
- Province: Kermanshah
- County: Sarpol-e Zahab
- Bakhsh: Central
- Rural District: Posht Tang

Population (2006)
  - Total: 161
- Time zone: UTC+3:30 (IRST)
  - Summer (DST): UTC+4:30 (IRDT)

Dangi-ye Abbas (Persian: دنگي عباس, also Romanized as Dangī-ye 'Abbās; also known as Dengī-ye 'Abbās Dāreh Zard) is a village in Posht Tang Rural District, in the Central District of Sarpol-e Zahab County, Kermanshah province, Iran. At the 2006 census, its population was 161, in 35 families.
