= Jaberi =

Jaberi (Persian: جابري) may refer to:

- Jaberi, Bushehr
- Jaberi, Kermanshah
- Jaberi, Khuzestan
- Mahlagha Jaberi (born 1989), Iranian influencer and Instagram model
