= Henidar-e Ebrahim Khan =

Henidar-e Ebrahim Khan هني درابراهيم خان
- Village
- Location within Iran
- Coordinates: 34°27′54″N 45°48′23″E
- Country: Iran
- Province: Kermanshah
- County: Sarpol-e Zahab
- Bakhsh: Central
- Rural District: Howmeh-ye Sarpol

Population (2006)
  - Total: 40
- Time zone: UTC+3:30 (IRST)
  - Summer (DST): UTC+4:30 (IRDT)

Henidar-e Ebrahim Khan (Persian: هني درابراهيم خان, also Romanized as Henīdar-e Ebrāhīm Khān; also known as Hendū-ye Soflā and Henīdar-e Soflá) is a village in Howmeh-ye Sarpol Rural District, in the Central District of Sarpol-e Zahab County, Kermanshah Province, Iran. At the 2006 census, its population was 40, in 7 families.
