= Qaleh Rashid Aqa =

Qaleh Rashid Aqa قلعه رشيداقا
- Village
- Location within Iran
- Coordinates: 34°29′31″N 45°50′59″E
- Country: Iran
- Province: Kermanshah
- County: Sarpol-e Zahab
- Bakhsh: Central
- Rural District: Howmeh-ye Sarpol

Population (2006)
  - Total: 238
- Time zone: UTC+3:30 (IRST)
  - Summer (DST): UTC+4:30 (IRDT)

Qaleh Rashid Aqa (Persian: قلعه رشيداقا, also Romanized as Qal‘eh Rashīd Āqā; also known as Gali, Guli, Qal’eh Pes Pes, and Rashīd ‘Abbāsī) is a village in Howmeh-ye Sarpol Rural District, in the Central District of Sarpol-e Zahab County, Kermanshah Province, Iran. At the 2006 census, its population was 238, in 54 families.
