= Henidar-e Mafruzeh =

Henidar-e Mafruzeh هنيدرمفروضه
- Village
- Location within Iran
- Coordinates: 34°28′07″N 45°49′26″E
- Country: Iran
- Province: Kermanshah
- County: Sarpol-e Zahab
- Bakhsh: Central
- Rural District: Howmeh-ye Sarpol

Population (2006)
  - Total: 121
- Time zone: UTC+3:30 (IRST)
  - Summer (DST): UTC+4:30 (IRDT)

Henidar-e Mafruzeh (Persian: هنيدرمفروضه, also Romanized as Henīdar-e Mafrūz̤eh; also known as Henīdar-e Mafrāẕeh and Henīdar-e ‘Olyā) is a village in Howmeh-ye Sarpol Rural District, in the Central District of Sarpol-e Zahab County, Kermanshah Province, Iran. At the 2006 census, its population was 121, in 27 families.
