= Jalalvand =

Jalalvand (Persian: جلالوند) may refer to:

- Jalalvand-e Olya
- Jalalvand-e Sofla
- Jalalvand Rural District
