= Henidar =

Henidar (Persian: هنيدر) may refer to:

- Henidar-e Ebrahim Khan
- Henidar-e Mafruzeh
