= Dulangan-e Olya =

Dulangan-e Olya دولنگان عليا
- Village
- Location within Iran
- Coordinates: 34°24′07″N 45°55′09″E
- Country: Iran
- Province: Kermanshah
- County: Sarpol-e Zahab
- Bakhsh: Central
- Rural District: Qaleh Shahin

Population (2006)
  - Total: 322
- Time zone: UTC+3:30 (IRST)
  - Summer (DST): UTC+4:30 (IRDT)

Dulangan-e Olya (Persian: دولنگان عليا, also Romanized as Dūlangān-e ‘Olyā; also known as Dolangān-e Bālā, Dolangān-e ‘Olyā, and Dūlgān-e Bālā) is a village in Qaleh Shahin Rural District, in the Central District of Sarpol-e Zahab County, Kermanshah Province, Iran. At the 2006 census, its population was 322, in 74 families.
