= Barq va Baran-e Olya =

Barq va Baran-e Olya برق وباران عليا
- Village
- Location within Iran
- Coordinates: 34°35′17″N 45°45′51″E
- Country: Iran
- Province: Kermanshah
- County: Sarpol-e Zahab
- Bakhsh: Central
- Rural District: Dasht-e Zahab

Population (2006)
  - Total: 31
- Time zone: UTC+3:30 (IRST)
  - Summer (DST): UTC+4:30 (IRDT)

Barq va Baran-e Olya (Persian: برق وباران عليا, also Romanized as Barq va Bārān-e ‘Olyā; also known as Bargbārān, Bargobārān, and Barq va Yārān) is a village in Dasht-e Zahab Rural District, in the Central District of Sarpol-e Zahab County, Kermanshah Province, Iran. At the 2006 census, its population was 31, in 7 families.
