= Barq va Baran-e Sofla =

Barq va Baran-e Sofla برق وباران سفلي
- Village
- Location within Iran
- Coordinates: 34°36′14″N 45°46′32″E
- Country: Iran
- Province: Kermanshah
- County: Sarpol-e Zahab
- Bakhsh: Central
- Rural District: Dasht-e Zahab

Population (2006)
  - Total: 89
- Time zone: UTC+3:30 (IRST)
  - Summer (DST): UTC+4:30 (IRDT)

Barq va Baran-e Sofla (Persian: برق وباران سفلي, also Romanized as Barq va Bārān-e Soflá; also known as Barq va Yārān) is a village in Dasht-e Zahab Rural District, in the Central District of Sarpol-e Zahab County, Kermanshah Province, Iran. At the 2006 census, its population was 89, in 17 families.
