= Pol Mahit =

Pol Mahit پل ماهيت
- Village
- Location within Iran
- Coordinates: 34°26′06″N 45°55′45″E
- Country: Iran
- Province: Kermanshah
- County: Sarpol-e Zahab
- Bakhsh: Central
- Rural District: Beshiva Pataq

Population (2006)
  - Total: 307
- Time zone: UTC+3:30 (IRST)
  - Summer (DST): UTC+4:30 (IRDT)

Pol Mahit (Persian: پل ماهيت, also Romanized as Pol Māhīt; also known as Mahakī Pol Māhīyat, Mahakī Pūl Māhī, Mahkī Pol Māhī, and Pūl Mahib) is a village in Beshiva Pataq Rural District, in the Central District of Sarpol-e Zahab County, Kermanshah Province, Iran. At the 2006 census, its population was 307, in 71 families.
