= Kuik-e Majid =

Neighborhood in Kermanshah province, Iran

Kuik-e Majid Persian: كوئيك مجيد
- Neighborhood
- Location within Iran
- Coordinates: 34°33′11″N 45°51′42″E
- Country: Iran
- Province: Kermanshah
- County: Sarpol-e Zahab
- District: Dasht-e Zahab
- Rural District: Dasht-e Zahab
- Village: Kuik

Population (2016)
  - Total: 233
- Time zone: UTC+3:30 (IRST)

Kuik-e Majid (Persian: كوئيك مجيد) (Note: Also romanized as Kū’īk-e Majīd; also known as Kūyakī Majīd, Kūyakī-ye Majīd, and Kūyekī-ye Majīd) is a neighborhood in the village of Kuik in Dasht-e Zahab Rural District of Dasht-e Zahab District in Sarpol-e Zahab County, Kermanshah province, Iran.

== Demographics ==
=== Population ===
At the time of the 2006 National Census, Kuik-e Majid's population was 230 in 48 households, when it was a village in the Central District. The following census in 2011 counted 260 people in 70 households. The 2016 census measured the population of the village as 233 people in 61 households.

After the census, the rural district was separated from the district in the formation of Dasht-e Zahab District. In addition, the villages of Kuik-e Azizi Amin, Kuik-e Hasan, Kuik-e Mahmud, and Kuik-e Majid were merged to form the village of Kuik.
