= Rikhak =

Rikhak (Persian: ريخك) may refer to:

- Rikhak-e Olya
- Rikhak-e Sofla
