= Dangi-ye Ali Beyg =

Dangi-ye Ali Beyg دنگي علي بيگ
- Village
- Location within Iran
- Coordinates: 34°38′35″N 46°00′50″E
- Country: Iran
- Province: Kermanshah
- County: Sarpol-e Zahab
- Bakhsh: Central
- Rural District: Posht Tang

Population (2006)
  - Total: 131
- Time zone: UTC+3:30 (IRST)
  - Summer (DST): UTC+4:30 (IRDT)

Dangi-ye Ali Beyg (Persian: دنگي علي بيگ, also Romanized as Dangī-ye 'Alī Beyg; also known as Dangī-ye 'Alī Beg and Dengī-ye 'Alībag) is a village in Posht Tang Rural District, in the Central District of Sarpol-e Zahab County, Kermanshah province, Iran. At the 2006 census, its population was 131, in 22 families.
