= Kalashi =

Kalashi (Persian: كلاشي) may refer to:

- Kalashi-ye Abdol Qader, Kermanshah Province
- Kalashi-ye Nahang, Kermanshah Province
- Kalashi District, in Kermanshah Province
- Kalashi Rural District, in Kermanshah Province
