= Dulangan-e Sofla =

Dulangan-e Sofla دولنگان سفلي
- Village
- Location within Iran
- Coordinates: 34°24′38″N 45°54′35″E
- Country: Iran
- Province: Kermanshah
- County: Sarpol-e Zahab
- Bakhsh: Central
- Rural District: Qaleh Shahin

Population (2006)
  - Total: 359
- Time zone: UTC+3:30 (IRST)
  - Summer (DST): UTC+4:30 (IRDT)

Dulangan-e Sofla (Persian: دولنگان سفلي, also Romanized as Dūlangān-e Soflá; also known as Dolangān-e Pā’īn, Dolangān-e Soflá, and Dūlgān-e Pā’īn) is a village in Qaleh Shahin Rural District, in the Central District of Sarpol-e Zahab County, Kermanshah Province, Iran. At the 2006 census, its population was 359, in 84 families.
