= Jalalvand-e Sofla =

Jalalvand-e Sofla جلالوندسفلي
- Village
- Location within Iran
- Coordinates: 34°28′14″N 45°54′09″E
- Country: Iran
- Province: Kermanshah
- County: Sarpol-e Zahab
- Bakhsh: Central
- Rural District: Beshiva Pataq

Population (2006)
  - Total: 239
- Time zone: UTC+3:30 (IRST)
  - Summer (DST): UTC+4:30 (IRDT)

Jalalvand-e Sofla (Persian: جلالوندسفلي, also Romanized as Jalālvand-e Soflá; also known as Jalālvand-e Pā’īn and Javālvand-e Soflá) is a village in Beshiva Pataq Rural District, in the Central District of Sarpol-e Zahab County, Kermanshah Province, Iran. At the 2006 census, its population was 239, in 52 families.
