= Qareh Bolagh-e Azam =

Village in Kermanshah province, Iran

Qareh Bolagh-e Azam Persian: قره بلاغ اعظم
- Village
- Location within Iran
- Coordinates: 34°28′23″N 45°49′33″E
- Country: Iran
- Province: Kermanshah
- County: Sarpol-e Zahab
- District: Central
- Rural District: Howmeh-ye Sarpol

Population (2016)
  - Total: 803
- Time zone: UTC+3:30 (IRST)

Qareh Bolagh-e Azam (Persian: قره بلاغ اعظم) (Note: Also romanized as Qarah Bolāgh-e A‘z̧am and Qareh Bolāgh-e A‘z̧am) is a village in Howmeh-ye Sarpol Rural District of the Central District of Sarpol-e Zahab County, Kermanshah province, Iran.

== Demographics ==
=== Population ===
At the time of the 2006 National Census, the village's population was 435 in 96 households. The following census in 2011 counted 554 people in 134 households. The 2016 census measured the population of the village as 803 people in 203 households. It was the most populous village in its rural district.
