= Barq va Baran =

Barq va Baran (Persian: برق وباران), also rendered as Barq va Yaran or Bargbaran or Bargobaran, may refer to:

- Barq va Baran-e Olya
- Barq va Baran-e Sofla
