= Kalareh-ye Mehrabi =

Kalareh-ye Mehrabi كلاره مهرابي
- Village
- Location within Iran
- Coordinates: 34°34′00″N 45°48′00″E
- Country: Iran
- Province: Kermanshah
- County: Sarpol-e Zahab
- Bakhsh: Central
- Rural District: Dasht-e Zahab

Population (2006)
  - Total: 33
- Time zone: UTC+3:30 (IRST)
  - Summer (DST): UTC+4:30 (IRDT)

Kalareh-ye Mehrabi (Persian: كلاره مهرابي, also Romanized as Kalāreh-ye Mehrābī; also known as Band Kalāleh, Kalāreh, Kalāreh-ye ‘Amaleh, and Kehlāra Zuhāb) is a village in Dasht-e Zahab Rural District, in the Central District of Sarpol-e Zahab County, Kermanshah Province, Iran. At the 2006 census, its population was 33, in 7 families.
