= Mivali-ye Sofla =

Mivali-ye Sofla ميولي سفلي
- Village
- Location within Iran
- Coordinates: 34°36′29″N 45°56′40″E
- Country: Iran
- Province: Kermanshah
- County: Sarpol-e Zahab
- Bakhsh: Central
- Rural District: Posht Tang

Population (2006)
  - Total: 260
- Time zone: UTC+3:30 (IRST)
  - Summer (DST): UTC+4:30 (IRDT)

Mivali-ye Sofla (Persian: ميولي سفلي, also Romanized as Mīvalī-ye Soflá; also known as Meyvolī, Mīr‘alī-ye Mīrkhān, and Mīvalī) is a village in Posht Tang Rural District, in the Central District of Sarpol-e Zahab County, Kermanshah Province, Iran. At the 2006 census, its population was 260, in 56 families.
