= Khargineh-ye Kuik-e Shekar =

Khargineh-ye Kuik-e Shekar خرگينه كوئيك شكر
- Village
- Location within Iran
- Coordinates: 34°26′49″N 45°51′37″E
- Country: Iran
- Province: Kermanshah
- County: Sarpol-e Zahab
- Bakhsh: Central
- Rural District: Howmeh-ye Sarpol

Population (2006)
  - Total: 1,136
- Time zone: UTC+3:30 (IRST)
  - Summer (DST): UTC+4:30 (IRDT)

Khargineh-ye Kuik-e Shekar (Persian: خرگينه كوئيك شكر, also Romanized as Khargīneh-ye Kū’īk-e Shekar; also known as Kū’īk and Kū’īk-e Shekar) is a village in Howmeh-ye Sarpol Rural District, in the Central District of Sarpol-e Zahab County, Kermanshah Province, Iran. At the 2006 census, its population was 1,136, with 259 families.
