= Kuik-e Hasan =

Neighborhood in Kermanshah province, Iran

Kuik-e Hasan Persian: كوئيك حسن
- Neighborhood
- Location within Iran
- Coordinates: 34°34′16″N 45°51′37″E
- Country: Iran
- Province: Kermanshah
- County: Sarpol-e Zahab
- District: Dasht-e Zahab
- Rural District: Dasht-e Zahab
- Village: Kuik

Population (2016)
  - Total: 598
- Time zone: UTC+3:30 (IRST)

Kuik-e Hasan (Persian: كوئيك حسن) (Note: Also romanized as Kū’īk-e Ḩasan; also known as Kūyakī Ḩesām, Kūyakī-ye Ḩasan, and Kūyekī-ye Ḩasam) is a neighborhood in the village of Kuik in Dasht-e Zahab Rural District of Dasht-e Zahab District in Sarpol-e Zahab County, Kermanshah province, Iran.

== Demographics ==
=== Population ===
At the time of the 2006 National Census, Kuik-e Hasan's population was 612 in 123 households, when it was a village in the Central District. The following census in 2011 counted 603 people in 141 households. The 2016 census measured the population of the village as 598 people in 152 households.

After the census, the rural district was separated from the district in the formation of Dasht-e Zahab District. In addition, the villages of Kuik-e Azizi Amin, Kuik-e Hasan, Kuik-e Mahmud, and Kuik-e Majid were merged to form the village of Kuik.
