= Mil Qader =

Mil Qader (Persian: ميل قادر) may refer to:

- Mil Qader-e Olya
- Mil Qader-e Sofla
