= Kalareh-ye Zhaleh =

Kalareh-ye Zhaleh كلاره ژاله
- Village
- Location within Iran
- Coordinates: 34°45′06″N 45°55′11″E
- Country: Iran
- Province: Kermanshah
- County: Sarpol-e Zahab
- Bakhsh: Central
- Rural District: Dasht-e Zahab

Population (2006)
  - Total: 76
- Time zone: UTC+3:30 (IRST)
  - Summer (DST): UTC+4:30 (IRDT)

Kalareh-ye Zhaleh (Persian: كلاره ژاله, also Romanized as Kalāreh-ye Zhāleh; also known as Kalāreh) is a village in Dasht-e Zahab Rural District, in the Central District of Sarpol-e Zahab County, Kermanshah Province, Iran. At the 2006 census, its population was 76, in 12 families.
