= Rikhak-e Sofla =

Rikhak-e Sofla ريخك سفلي
- Village
- Location within Iran
- Coordinates: 34°27′55″N 45°48′57″E
- Country: Iran
- Province: Kermanshah
- County: Sarpol-e Zahab
- Bakhsh: Central
- Rural District: Howmeh-ye Sarpol

Population (2006)
  - Total: 92
- Time zone: UTC+3:30 (IRST)
  - Summer (DST): UTC+4:30 (IRDT)

Rikhak-e Sofla (Persian: ريخك سفلي, also Romanized as Rīkhak-e Soflá; also known as Haft Sahmī) is a village in Howmeh-ye Sarpol Rural District, in the Central District of Sarpol-e Zahab County, Kermanshah Province, Iran. At the 2006 census, its population was 92, in 23 families.
