= Kuik-e Azizi Amin =

Neighborhood in Kermanshah province, Iran

Kuik-e Azizi Amin Persian: كوئيك عزيزي امين
- Neighborhood
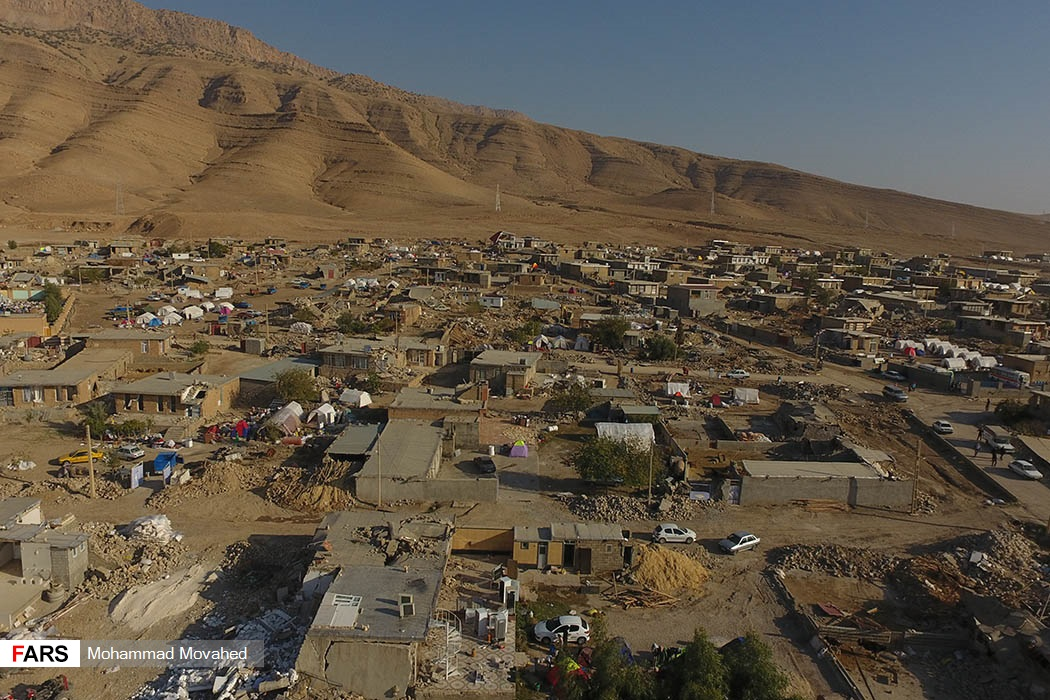
- Aerial photo of the village

- Location within Iran
- Coordinates: 34°33′39″N 45°51′41″E
- Country: Iran
- Province: Kermanshah
- County: Sarpol-e Zahab
- District: Dasht-e Zahab
- Rural District: Dasht-e Zahab
- Village: Kuik

Population (2016)
  - Total: 701
- Time zone: UTC+3:30 (IRST)

Kuik-e Azizi Amin (Persian: كوئيك عزيزي امين) (Note: Also romanized as Kū’īk-e ‘Azīzī Amīn; also known as Kū’īk-e ‘Azīz and Kūyakī-ye ‘Azīz) is a neighborhood in the village of Kuik in Dasht-e Zahab Rural District of Dasht-e Zahab District in Sarpol-e Zahab County, Kermanshah province, Iran.

== Demographics ==
=== Population ===
At the time of the 2006 National Census, Kuik-e Azizi Amin's population was 639 in 121 households, when it was a village in the Central District. The following census in 2011 counted 654 people in 166 households. The 2016 census measured the population of the village as 701 people in 195 households. It was the most populous village in its rural district.

After the census, the rural district was separated from the district in the formation of Dasht-e Zahab District. In addition, the villages of Kuik-e Azizi Amin, Kuik-e Hasan, Kuik-e Mahmud, and Kuik-e Majid were merged to form the village of Kuik.
