= Golam Kabud =

Golam Kabud or Galam Kabud (Persian: گلم كبود) may refer to:

- Golam Kabud-e Olya (disambiguation)
- Golam Kabud-e Sofla (disambiguation)

== See also ==
- Gelam Kabud (disambiguation)
