= Sarab-e Qaleh Shahin Rural District =

Rural district in Kermanshah province, Iran

Sarab-e Qaleh Shahin Rural District Persian: دهستان سراب قلعه شاهین
- Rural District
- Location within Iran
- Coordinates: 34°16′35″N 46°02′23″E
- Country: Iran
- Province: Kermanshah
- County: Sarpol-e Zahab
- District: Qaleh Shahin
- Capital: Sarab-e Qaleh Shahin

Population (2016)
  - Total: 5,974
- Time zone: UTC+3:30 (IRST)

Sarab-e Qaleh Shahin Rural District (Persian: دهستان سراب قلعه شاهین) is in Qaleh Shahin District of Sarpol-e Zahab County, Kermanshah province, Iran. Its capital is the village of Sarab-e Qaleh Shahin.

== History ==
In 2013, Qaleh Shahin Rural District was separated from the Central District in the formation of Qaleh Shahin District, and Sarab-e Qaleh Shahin Rural District was created in the new district.

== Demographics ==
=== Population ===
At the time of the 2016 National Census, the rural district's population was 5,974 in 1,719 households. The most populous of its 20 villages was Sarbagh-e Golin, with 1,397 people.
