= Habibvand =

Village in Kermanshah province, Iran

Habibvand Persian: حبيب وند
- Village
- Location within Iran
- Coordinates: 34°25′52″N 45°57′09″E
- Country: Iran
- Province: Kermanshah
- County: Sarpol-e Zahab
- District: Central
- Rural District: Beshiva Pataq

Population (2016)
  - Total: 785
- Time zone: UTC+3:30 (IRST)

Habibvand (Persian: حبيب وند) (Note: Also romanized as Ḩabībvand; also known as Habīb, Ḩabībvand-e Soflá, and Mahkī-ye Bālā) is a village in Beshiva Pataq Rural District of the Central District of Sarpol-e Zahab County, Kermanshah province, Iran.

== Demographics ==
=== Population ===
At the time of the 2006 National Census, the village's population was 831 in 190 households. The following census in 2011 counted 906 people in 230 households. The 2016 census measured the population of the village as 785 people in 220 households. It was the most populous village in its rural district.
