= Golam Kabud-e Sofla =

Golam Kabud-e Sofla or Galam Kabud-e Sofla (Persian: گلم كبودسفلي) may refer to:

- Golam Kabud-e Sofla, Kermanshah
- Galam Kabud-e Sofla, Sarpol-e Zahab, Kermanshah Province
