= Ravileh-ye Hasan =

Ravileh-ye Hasan رويله حسن
- Village
- Location within Iran
- Coordinates: 34°47′31″N 45°45′00″E
- Country: Iran
- Province: Kermanshah
- County: Salas-e Babajani
- Bakhsh: Ozgoleh
- Rural District: Sarqaleh

Population (2006)
  - Total: 50
- Time zone: UTC+3:30 (IRST)
  - Summer (DST): UTC+4:30 (IRDT)

Ravileh-ye Hasan (Persian: رويله حسن, also Romanized as Ravīleh-ye Ḩasan; also known as Ravīleh, Ravīleh-ye Bālā, and Rovīleh) is a village in Sarqaleh Rural District, Ozgoleh District, Salas-e Babajani County, Kermanshah Province, Iran. At the 2006 census, its population was 50, in 8 families.
