= Kani Shirineh =

Kani Shirineh كاني شيرينه
- Village
- Location within Iran
- Coordinates: 34°45′06″N 45°49′11″E
- Country: Iran
- Province: Kermanshah
- County: Salas-e Babajani
- Bakhsh: Ozgoleh
- Rural District: Jeygaran

Population (2006)
  - Total: 84
- Time zone: UTC+3:30 (IRST)
  - Summer (DST): UTC+4:30 (IRDT)

Kani Shirineh (Persian: كاني شيرينه, also Romanized as Kānī Shīrīneh; also known as Kānī Shīrīn) is a village in Jeygaran Rural District, Ozgoleh District, Salas-e Babajani County, Kermanshah Province, Iran. At the 2006 census, its population was 84, in 18 families.
