= Morad Khani Siareh Jagiran =

Morad Khani Siareh Jagiran مرادخاني سياره جگيران
- Village
- Country: Iran
- Province: Kermanshah
- County: Salas-e Babajani
- Bakhsh: Ozgoleh
- Rural District: Jeygaran

Population (2006)
  - Total: 129
- Time zone: UTC+3:30 (IRST)
  - Summer (DST): UTC+4:30 (IRDT)

Morad Khani Siareh Jagiran (Persian: مرادخاني سياره جگيران, also Romanized as Morād Khānī Sīāreh Jagīrān) is a village in Jeygaran Rural District, Ozgoleh District, Salas-e Babajani County, Kermanshah Province, Iran. At the 2006 census, its population was 129, in 20 families.
