= Rizvand-e Ali Akbar =

Rizvand-e Ali Akbar ريزوندعلي اكبر
- Village
- Location within Iran
- Coordinates: 34°26′45″N 45°54′22″E
- Country: Iran
- Province: Kermanshah
- County: Sarpol-e Zahab
- Bakhsh: Central
- Rural District: Beshiva Pataq

Population (2006)
  - Total: 160
- Time zone: UTC+3:30 (IRST)
  - Summer (DST): UTC+4:30 (IRDT)

Rizvand-e Ali Akbar (Persian: ريزوندعلي اكبر, also Romanized as Rīzvand-e ‘Alī Akbar; also known as Rīzehvand-e ‘Alī Akbar and Rīzvand-e Pā’īn) is a village in Beshiva Pataq Rural District, in the Central District of Sarpol-e Zahab County, Kermanshah Province, Iran. At the 2006 census, its population was 160, in 40 families.
