= Mish Rangin-e Hajji Qader =

Mish Rangin-e Hajji Qader ميش رنگين حاجي قادر
- Village
- Location within Iran
- Coordinates: 34°43′01″N 45°48′50″E
- Country: Iran
- Province: Kermanshah
- County: Salas-e Babajani
- Bakhsh: Ozgoleh
- Rural District: Jeygaran

Population (2006)
  - Total: 89
- Time zone: UTC+3:30 (IRST)
  - Summer (DST): UTC+4:30 (IRDT)

Mish Rangin-e Hajji Qader (Persian: ميش رنگين حاجي قادر, also Romanized as Mīsh Rangīn-e Ḩājjī Qāder; also known as Mīsh Rangīn) is a village in Jeygaran Rural District, Ozgoleh District, Salas-e Babajani County, Kermanshah Province, Iran. At the 2006 census, its population was 89, in 16 families.
