= Qaleh Rafi =

Qaleh Rafi (Persian: قلعه رفيع) may refer to:

- Qaleh Rafi, Hamadan
- Qaleh Rafi, Kermanshah
