= Golam Kabud-e Olya =

Golam Kabud-e Olya or Galam Kabud-e Olya (Persian: گلم كبودعليا) may refer to:

- Golam Kabud-e Olya, Kermanshah
- Galam Kabud-e Olya, Sarpol-e Zahab, Kermanshah Province
