= Kuzeh Rud =

Kuzeh Rud كوزه رود
- Village
- Location within Iran
- Coordinates: 34°48′09″N 45°45′32″E
- Country: Iran
- Province: Kermanshah
- County: Salas-e Babajani
- Bakhsh: Ozgoleh
- Rural District: Sarqaleh

Population (2006)
  - Total: 97
- Time zone: UTC+3:30 (IRST)
  - Summer (DST): UTC+4:30 (IRDT)

Kuzeh Rud (Persian: كوزه رود, also Romanized as Kūzeh Rūd) is a village in Sarqaleh Rural District, Ozgoleh District, Salas-e Babajani County, Kermanshah Province, Iran. At the 2006 census, its population was 97, in 15 families.
