= Emam Abbas-e Sofla =

Emam Abbas-e Sofla امام عباس سفلي
- Village
- Country: Iran
- Province: Kermanshah
- County: Salas-e Babajani
- Bakhsh: Ozgoleh
- Rural District: Jeygaran

Population (2006)
  - Total: 41
- Time zone: UTC+3:30 (IRST)
  - Summer (DST): UTC+4:30 (IRDT)

Emam Abbas-e Sofla (Persian: امام عباس سفلي, also Romanized as Emām ʿAbbās-e Soflá) is a village in Jeygaran Rural District, Ozgoleh District, Salas-e Babajani County, Kermanshah Province, Iran. At the 2006 census, its population was 41, in 7 families.
