= Rizvand-e Najaf =

Village in Kermanshah province, Iran

Rizvand-e Najaf Persian: ريزوند نجف
- Village
- Location within Iran
- Coordinates: 34°26′44″N 45°54′52″E
- Country: Iran
- Province: Kermanshah
- County: Sarpol-e Zahab
- District: Central
- Rural District: Beshiva Pataq

Population (2016)
  - Total: 201
- Time zone: UTC+3:30 (IRST)

Rizvand-e Najaf (Persian: ريزوندنجف) (Note: Also romanized as Rīzvand-e Najaf; also known as Rezawand, Ridhwān, Rīzavand, Rīzehvand, Rīzehvand-e Najaf, and Rīzvand-e Bālā) is a village in, and the capital of, Beshiva Pataq Rural District of the Central District of Sarpol-e Zahab County, Kermanshah province, Iran.

== Demographics ==
=== Population ===
At the time of the 2006 National Census, the village's population was 273 in 64 households. The following census in 2011 counted 223 people in 60 households. The 2016 census measured the population of the village as 201 people in 58 households.
