= Kuik, Kermanshah =

Village in Kermanshah province, Iran

Kuik Persian: کوئیک
- Village
- Location within Iran
- Coordinates: 34°33′41″N 45°51′43″E
- Country: Iran
- Province: Kermanshah
- County: Sarpol-e Zahab
- District: Dasht-e Zahab
- Rural District: Dasht-e Zahab
- Time zone: UTC+3:30 (IRST)

Kuik (Persian: کوئیک) is a village in Dasht-e Zahab Rural District of Dasht-e Zahab District, Sarpol-e Zahab County, Kermanshah province, Iran, serving as capital of the district.

== History ==
After the 2016 National Census, the villages of Kuik-e Azizi Amin, Kuik-e Hasan, Kuik-e Mahmud, and Kuik-e Majid were merged to form the village of Kuik.
