= Keskea rõõmud =

1986 film directed by Lembit Ulfsak

- Directed by: Lembit Ulfsak
- Written by: Valentin Kuik; Andrei Dmitrijev
- Starring: Tõnu Kark; Maria Klenskaja; Kaie Mihkelson; Ülle Kaljuste; Lembit Ulfsak
- Cinematography: Nikolai Sharubin
- Edited by: Tiina Lokk
- Music by: Tõnu Aare
- Production company: Tallinnfilm
- Release date: 11 December 1986
- Running time: 71 minutes
- Country: Estonia
- Language: Estonian

Keskea rõõmud (English: The Joys of Midlife) is a 1986 Estonian comedy-drama film directed by Lembit Ulfsak.

Awards, nominations, participations:

- 1987: ETKVL filmiklubi debüütfilmide festival (Tallinn, USSR), 1987, Rainbow award (Estonian: Vikerkaare auhind) - best director debut: Lembit Ulfsak; best cinematographer debut: Nikolai Šarubin
- 1987: Estonian Film Days in Helsinki, participation
- 1987: All-Union Film Festival (USSR), participation

== Plot ==
Set during the late Soviet period, the film follows five middle-aged men traveling across Estonia to consult a renowned faith healer. The narrative depicts everyday life, social conditions, and common challenges in Estonia during that era.

== Cast ==
- Tõnu Kark - Tõnu Loorits
- Maria Klenskaja - Pille Loorits
- Kaie Mihkelson - Helena
- Ülle Kaljuste - Silva Raud
- Lembit Ulfsak - Hubert Raud
