= Habib (angel) =

Angel in Islamic tradition

Ḥabīb (Arabic: حبيب) is a prominent angel in Islamic mythology, traditionally described as being miraculously composed of both fire and ice. He features prominently in accounts of Muhammad's Night Journey (Mi'raj), with narratives codified around the 9th and 10th centuries CE. However, descriptions of an angel formed from fire and ice are attested even earlier by the 8th-century scholar Muqātil ibn Sulaymān, suggesting the tradition likely dates back to the first century of Islamic history. : 252

== Symbolism and Lore ==
In classical Islamic tradition, Habib serves as a celestial symbol of divine omnipresence and communal reconciliation. According to theological interpretations, the miraculous coexistence of fire and ice within the angel—where the fire fails to melt the ice and the ice fails to extinguish the fire—demonstrates God's supreme power to create the impossible and harmonize even the most fiercely estranged forces.

By the era of the Sufi scholar Nishāpūr al-Qushayrī (d. 1072 CE), Islamic literature described an entire host of similar angels composed of half-fire and half-snow, who continuously pray to God for the reconciliation and unity of believers. : 257 In certain Persian adaptations of the Miraj literature, the leader of this angelic host is identified as Qābīl. : 258 This imagery also parallels descriptions found in the Jewish pseudepigraphal work, the Apocalypse of Moses, which features angelic hosts known as the ʾĪšīm, a concept likely influenced by or shared with later Islamic depictions. : 263–266
