= Mil Qader-e Olya =

Mil Qader-e Olya ميل قادرعليا
- Village
- Country: Iran
- Province: Kermanshah
- County: Salas-e Babajani
- Bakhsh: Ozgoleh
- Rural District: Jeygaran

Population (2006)
  - Total: 138
- Time zone: UTC+3:30 (IRST)
  - Summer (DST): UTC+4:30 (IRDT)

Mil Qader-e Olya (Persian: ميل قادرعليا, also Romanized as Mīl Qāder-e ‘Olyā) is a village in Jeygaran Rural District, Ozgoleh District, Salas-e Babajani County, Kermanshah Province, Iran. At the 2006 census, its population was 138, in 33 families.
