= Valentin Kuik =

Estonian filmmaker (1943–2025)

Valentin Kuik (27 January 1943 – 30 October 2025) was an Estonian film director, screenwriter and writer.

After serving in the army, Kuik worked as a lighting engineer for Eesti Televisioon, and from 1968 to 1970 as a puppeteer at the Tallinnfilm. From 1975 to 1992, Kuik was a director and screenwriter at Tallinnfilm, and later made documentaries at Eesti Telefilm and other studios. He died on 30 October 2025, at the age of 82.

== Filmography ==
=== Director ===
- "Löö vastu" (1975) (short film)
- "Teaduse ohver" (1981)
- "Lurich" (1983)
- "Perekonnapildid" (1989)
- "Armastuse lahinguväljad" (1992)
- "Fair play" (1994)
- "Lurjus" (1999)

=== Screenwriter ===
- "Reigi õpetaja" (1977)
- Keskea rõõmud (1986)
- "Doktor Stockmann" (1988)
- Kõrini! (2005)
