= Deh-e Hajji Mirza Khan =

Deh-e Hajji Mirza Khan ده حاجي ميرزا خان
- Village
- Location within Iran
- Coordinates: 31°02′57″N 61°46′42″E
- Country: Iran
- Province: Sistan and Baluchestan
- County: Hirmand
- Bakhsh: Central
- Rural District: Jahanabad

Population (2006)
  - Total: 196
- Time zone: UTC+3:30 (IRST)
  - Summer (DST): UTC+4:30 (IRDT)

Deh-e Hajji Mirza Khan (Persian: ده حاجي ميرزا خان, also Romanized as Deh-e Ḩājjī Mīrzā Khān; also known as Ḩājjī Mīrzā Khān) is a village in Jahanabad Rural District, in the Central District of Hirmand County, Sistan and Baluchestan Province, Iran. At the 2006 census, its population was 196, in 36 families.
