= Golam Kabud-e Sofla, Kermanshah =

Village in Kermanshah, Iran

Golam Kabud-e Sofla گلم كبودسفلي
- Village
- Location within Iran
- Coordinates: 34°06′29″N 47°11′36″E
- Country: Iran
- Province: Kermanshah
- County: Kermanshah
- Bakhsh: Firuzabad
- Rural District: Sar Firuzabad

Population (2006)
  - Total: 66
- Time zone: UTC+3:30 (IRST)
  - Summer (DST): UTC+4:30 (IRDT)

Golam Kabud-e Sofla (Persian: گلم كبودسفلي, also Romanized as Golam Kabūd-e Soflá; also known as Kalam Kabūd-e Soflá) is a village located in Sar Firuzabad Rural District, Firuzabad District, Kermanshah County, in Kermanshah Province, Iran. According to the 2006 census, the village had a population of 66 individuals living in 11 families.
