= Gelam Kabud, Lorestan =

Village in Lorestan, Iran

Gelam Kabud گلم كبود
- Village
- Location within Iran
- Coordinates: 33°42′00″N 48°28′07″E
- Country: Iran
- Province: Lorestan
- County: Khorramabad
- Bakhsh: Bayravand
- Rural District: Beyranvand-e Shomali

Population (2006)
  - Total: 42
- Time zone: UTC+3:30 (IRST)
  - Summer (DST): UTC+4:30 (IRDT)

Gelam Kabud (Persian: گلم كبود, also Romanized as Gelam Kabūd, Gholām Kabūd, and Golom Kabūd) is a village in Beyranvand-e Shomali Rural District, Bayravand District, Khorramabad County, Lorestan Province, Iran. At the 2006 census, its population was 42, in 10 families.
