= Kalashi-ye Nahang =

Kalashi-ye Nahang كلاشي نهنگ
- Village
- Location within Iran
- Coordinates: 34°55′29″N 46°03′00″E
- Country: Iran
- Province: Kermanshah
- County: Salas-e Babajani
- Bakhsh: Central
- Rural District: Khaneh Shur

Population (2006)
  - Total: 217
- Time zone: UTC+3:30 (IRST)
  - Summer (DST): UTC+4:30 (IRDT)

Kalashi-ye Nahang (Persian: كلاشي نهنگ, also Romanized as Kalāshī-ye Nahang; also known as Kalāsh-e Nahang, Nahang, and Nehang) is a village in Khaneh Shur Rural District, in the Central District of Salas-e Babajani County, Kermanshah Province, Iran. At the 2006 census, its population was 217, in 49 families.
