= Golam Kabud-e Olya, Kermanshah =

Golam Kabud-e Olya گلم كبودعليا
- Village
- Location within Iran
- Coordinates: 34°05′57″N 47°12′15″E
- Country: Iran
- Province: Kermanshah
- County: Kermanshah
- Bakhsh: Firuzabad
- Rural District: Sar Firuzabad

Population (2006)
  - Total: 23
- Time zone: UTC+3:30 (IRST)
  - Summer (DST): UTC+4:30 (IRDT)

Golam Kabud-e Olya (Persian: گلم كبودعليا, also Romanized as Golam Kabūd-e ‘Olyā; also known as Kalam Kabūd-e ‘Olyā) is a village in Sar Firuzabad Rural District, Firuzabad District, Kermanshah County, Kermanshah Province, Iran. At the 2006 census, its population was 23, in 5 families.
