= Dangi language =

Dangi may be:

- Dhanki language
- Braj Bhasha
