= Sarabeleh, Kermanshah =

Sarabeleh سرابله
- Village
- Location within Iran
- Coordinates: 34°32′33″N 47°01′25″E
- Country: Iran
- Province: Kermanshah
- County: Kermanshah
- Bakhsh: Central
- Rural District: Miyan Darband

Population (2006)
  - Total: 116
- Time zone: UTC+3:30 (IRST)
  - Summer (DST): UTC+4:30 (IRDT)

Sarabeleh (Persian: سرابله, also Romanized as Sarābeleh, Sarābīeh, and Sar Ābleh; also known as Sārābāla and Sarābīyeh) is a village in Miyan Darband Rural District, in the Central District of Kermanshah County, Kermanshah Province, Iran. At the 2006 census, its population was 116, in 33 families.
