= Al-Habib =

Al-Habib may refer to:

- Yasser Al-Habib, Kuwaiti Shia cleric
- Habib Al-Habib, Saudi television actor
- Muhammad ibn al-Habib, Moroccan teacher & Islamic author, and
- Jarh Al Habib, the sixth studio album by Lebanese-Emirati singer, Diana Haddad
- Radwan al-Habib, Syrian politician
- Hassan Al-Habib, Saudi footballer
- Hassan Al Habib, rebel militia spokesman, Central African Republic
- Muhammad VI al-Habib (d.1929), Husainid dynastic ruler
