= Golom Kabud, Kermanshah =

Golom Kabud گلم كبود
- Village
- Location within Iran
- Coordinates: 34°36′14″N 47°36′59″E
- Country: Iran
- Province: Kermanshah
- County: Sahneh
- Bakhsh: Central
- Rural District: Khodabandehlu

Population (2006)
  - Total: 67
- Time zone: UTC+3:30 (IRST)
  - Summer (DST): UTC+4:30 (IRDT)

Golom Kabud (Persian: گلم كبود, also Romanized as Golom Kabūd) is a village in Khodabandehlu Rural District, in the Central District of Sahneh County, Kermanshah Province, Iran. At the 2006 census, its population was 67, in 18 families.
