= Night Journey =

Night Journey may refer to:

- Isra' and Mi'raj, a night journey taken by Muhammad in 621, an event of major importance in Islam
- Night Journey, a 1941 spy thriller novel by Winston Graham
- Gece Yolculuğu (lit. Night Journey), a 1987 Turkish drama film
- Night Journey (1938 film), directed by Oswald Mitchell
- Night Journeys, a 1979 children's book by Avi
- Night Journey (ballet), a Martha Graham ballet
- Night Journey (song), a 2020 song by Yorushika
- The Night Journey (novel), a 1981 novel by Kathryn Lasky

== See also ==
- Night Flight (disambiguation)
