= Rizvand, Mahidasht =

Rizvand ريزوند
- Village
- Location within Iran
- Coordinates: 34°11′57″N 46°55′55″E
- Country: Iran
- Province: Kermanshah
- County: Kermanshah
- Bakhsh: Mahidasht
- Rural District: Mahidasht

Population (2006)
  - Total: 392
- Time zone: UTC+3:30 (IRST)
  - Summer (DST): UTC+4:30 (IRDT)

Rizvand (Persian: ريزوند, also Romanized as Rīzvand and Rīz Vand; also known as Rīzehvand) is a village in Mahidasht Rural District, Mahidasht District, Kermanshah County, Kermanshah Province, Iran. At the 2006 census, its population was 392, in 94 families.
