= Sarqaleh Rural District =

Rural district in Kermanshah province, Iran

Sarqaleh Rural District Persian: دهستان سرقلعه
- Rural District
- Location within Iran
- Coordinates: 34°44′19″N 45°43′24″E
- Country: Iran
- Province: Kermanshah
- County: Sarpol-e Zahab
- District: Dasht-e Zahab
- Capital: Tappeh Rash

Population (2016)
  - Total: 542
- Time zone: UTC+3:30 (IRST)

Sarqaleh Rural District (Persian: دهستان سرقلعه) is in Dasht-e Zahab District of Sarpol-e Zahab County, Kermanshah province, Iran. Its capital is the village of Tappeh Rash.

== Demographics ==
=== Population ===
At the time of the 2006 National Census, the rural district's population (as a part of Ezgeleh District of Salas-e Babajani County) was 609 in 105 households. There were 631 inhabitants in 147 households at the following census of 2011. The 2016 census measured the population of the rural district as 542 in 137 households, by which time it had been transferred to the Central District of Sarpol-e Zahab County. The most populous of its 29 villages was Tappeh Kanan, with 106 people.

After the 2016 census, the rural district was separated from the district in the formation of Dasht-e Zahab District.
