= Qaleh Shahin District =

District in Kermanshah province, Iran

Qaleh Shahin District Persian: بخش قلعه شاهین
- District
- Location within Iran
- Coordinates: 34°19′43″N 45°59′11″E
- Country: Iran
- Province: Kermanshah
- County: Sarpol-e Zahab
- Capital: Davazdah Emam

Population (2016)
  - Total: 11,265
- Time zone: UTC+3:30 (IRST)

Qaleh Shahin District (Persian: بخش قلعه شاهین) is in Sarpol-e Zahab County, Kermanshah province, Iran. Its capital is the village of Davazdah Emam.

== History ==
After the 2011 National Census, Qaleh Shahin Rural District was separated from the Central District in the formation of Qaleh Shahin District.

== Demographics ==
=== Population ===
At the time of the 2016 census, the district's population was 11,265 inhabitants in 3,300 households.

=== Administrative divisions ===
Qaleh Shahin District Population
Administrative Divisions	2016
Qaleh Shahin RD	5,291
Sarab-e Qaleh Shahin RD	5,974
Total	11,265
RD = Rural District
