= Dasht-e Zahab District =

District in Kermanshah province, Iran

Dasht-e Zahab District Persian: بخش دشت ذهاب
- District
- Location within Iran
- Coordinates: 34°41′36″N 45°51′56″E
- Country: Iran
- Province: Kermanshah
- County: Sarpol-e Zahab
- Capital: Kuik
- Time zone: UTC+3:30 (IRST)

Dasht-e Zahab District (Persian: بخش دشت ذهاب) is in Sarpol-e Zahab County, Kermanshah province, Iran. Its capital is the village of Kuik, whose population at the time of the 2016 census was 1,754 people in 464 households.

== History ==
After the 2016 National Census, Dasht-e Zahab, Jeygaran, Posht Tang, and Sarqaleh Rural Districts were separated from the Central District in the formation of Dasht-e Zahab District. In addition, several villages merged to establish the new village of Kuik, capital of the district.

== Demographics ==
=== Administrative divisions ===
Dasht-e Zahab District
Administrative Divisions
Dasht-e Zahab RD
Jeygaran RD
Posht Tang RD
Sarqaleh RD
RD = Rural District
