= Jeygaran Rural District =

Rural district in Kermanshah province, Iran

Jeygaran Rural District Persian: دهستان جيگران
- Rural District
- Location within Iran
- Coordinates: 34°42′03″N 45°53′18″E
- Country: Iran
- Province: Kermanshah
- County: Sarpol-e Zahab
- District: Dasht-e Zahab
- Capital: Gardeh Now

Population (2016)
  - Total: 2,032
- Time zone: UTC+3:30 (IRST)

Jeygaran Rural District (Persian: دهستان جيگران) is in Dasht-e Zahab District of Sarpol-e Zahab County, Kermanshah province, Iran. Its capital is the village of Gardeh Now.

== Demographics ==
=== Population ===
At the time of the 2006 National Census, the rural district's population (as a part of Ezgeleh District of Salas-e Babajani County) was 2,867 in 544 households. There were 3,202 inhabitants in 597 households at the following census of 2011. The 2016 census measured the population of the rural district as 2,032 in 484 households, by which time it had been transferred to the Central District of Sarpol-e Zahab County. The most populous of its 28 villages was Tappeh Kabud, with 146 people.

After the census, the rural district was separated from the district in the formation of Dasht-e Zahab District.
