= Qaleh Shahin Rural District =

Rural district in Kermanshah province, Iran

Qaleh Shahin Rural District Persian: دهستان قلعه شاهين
- Rural District
- Location within Iran
- Coordinates: 34°22′56″N 45°55′41″E
- Country: Iran
- Province: Kermanshah
- County: Sarpol-e Zahab
- District: Qaleh Shahin
- Capital: Tarkeh Veys

Population (2016)
  - Total: 5,291
- Time zone: UTC+3:30 (IRST)

Qaleh Shahin Rural District (Persian: دهستان قلعه شاهين) is in Qaleh Shahin District of Sarpol-e Zahab County, Kermanshah province, Iran. Its capital is the village of Tarkeh Veys.

== Demographics ==
=== Population ===
At the time of the 2006 National Census, the rural district's population (as a part of the Central District) was 13,109 in 3,023 households. There were 13,006 inhabitants in 3,296 households at the following census of 2011. The 2016 census measured the population of the rural district as 5,291 in 1,581 households, by which time the rural district had been separated from the district in the formation of Qaleh Shahin District. The most populous of its 22 villages was Davazdah Emam, with 767 people.
