= Beshiva Pataq Rural District =

Rural district in Kermanshah province, Iran

Beshiva Pataq Rural District Persian: دهستان بشيوه پاطاق
- Rural District
- Location within Iran
- Coordinates: 34°24′59″N 45°57′59″E
- Country: Iran
- Province: Kermanshah
- County: Sarpol-e Zahab
- District: Central
- Capital: Rizvand-e Najaf

Population (2016)
  - Total: 5,480
- Time zone: UTC+3:30 (IRST)

Beshiva Pataq Rural District (Persian: دهستان بشيوه پاطاق) is in the Central District of Sarpol-e Zahab County, Kermanshah province, Iran. Its capital is the village of Rizvand-e Najaf.

== Demographics ==
=== Population ===
At the time of the 2006 National Census, the rural district's population was 6,518 in 1,515 households. There were 6,407 inhabitants in 1,691 households at the following census of 2011. The 2016 census measured the population of the rural district as 5,480 in 1,617 households. The most populous of its 28 villages was Habibvand, with 785 people.
