= Dasht-e Zahab Rural District =

Rural district in Kermanshah province, Iran

Dasht-e Zahab Rural District Persian: دهستان دشت ذهاب
- Rural District
- Location within Iran
- Coordinates: 34°36′24″N 45°49′02″E
- Country: Iran
- Province: Kermanshah
- County: Sarpol-e Zahab
- District: Dasht-e Zahab
- Capital: Mirmiru

Population (2016)
  - Total: 6,465
- Time zone: UTC+3:30 (IRST)

Dasht-e Zahab Rural District (Persian: دهستان دشت ذهاب) is in Dasht-e Zahab District of Sarpol-e Zahab County, Kermanshah province, Iran. Its capital is the village of Mirmiru.

== Demographics ==
=== Population ===
At the time of the 2006 National Census, the rural district's population (as a part of the Central District) was 6,925 in 1,319 households. There were 6,854 inhabitants in 1,579 households at the following census of 2011. The 2016 census measured the population of the rural district as 6,465 in 1,615 households. The most populous of its 36 villages was Kuik-e Azizi Amin, with 701 people.

After the 2016 census, Dasht-e Zahab, Jeygaran, Posht Tang, and Sarqaleh Rural Districts were separated from the Central District in the establishment of Dasht-e Zahab District.
