= Posht Tang Rural District =

Rural district in Kermanshah province, Iran

Posht Tang Rural District Persian: دهستان پشت تنگ
- Rural District
- Location within Iran
- Coordinates: 34°37′46″N 45°58′04″E
- Country: Iran
- Province: Kermanshah
- County: Sarpol-e Zahab
- District: Dasht-e Zahab
- Capital: Bozmirabad

Population (2016)
  - Total: 5,582
- Time zone: UTC+3:30 (IRST)

Posht Tang Rural District (Persian: دهستان پشت تنگ) is in Dasht-e Zahab District of Sarpol-e Zahab County, Kermanshah province, Iran. Its capital is the village of Bozmirabad.

== Demographics ==
=== Population ===
At the time of the 2006 National Census, the rural district's population (as a part of the Central District) was 6,476 in 1,176 households. There were 6,474 inhabitants in 1,427 households at the following census of 2011. The 2016 census measured the population of the rural district as 5,582 in 1,321 households. The most populous of its 39 villages was Bozmirabad, with 1,111 people.

After the 2016 census, the rural district was separated from the district in the formation of Dasht-e Zahab District.
