= Howmeh-ye Sarpol Rural District =

Rural district in Kermanshah province, Iran

Howmeh-ye Sarpol Rural District Persian: دهستان حومه سرپل
- Rural District
- Location within Iran
- Coordinates: 34°28′33″N 45°50′20″E
- Country: Iran
- Province: Kermanshah
- County: Sarpol-e Zahab
- District: Central
- Capital: Shahrak-e Zerai Qareh Bolagh

Population (2016)
  - Total: 8,360
- Time zone: UTC+3:30 (IRST)

Howmeh-ye Sarpol Rural District (Persian: دهستان حومه سرپل) is in the Central District of Sarpol-e Zahab County, Kermanshah province, Iran. Its capital is the village of Shahrak-e Zerai Qareh Bolagh.

== Demographics ==
=== Population ===
At the time of the 2006 National Census, the rural district's population was 13,768 in 2,990 households. There were 16,643 inhabitants in 4,160 households at the following census of 2011. The 2016 census measured the population of the rural district as 8,360 in 2,335 households. The most populous of its 48 villages was Qareh Bolagh-e Azam, with 803 people.
