= Sarpol-e Zahab County =

County in Kermanshah province, Iran

Sarpol-e Zahab County Persian: شهرستان سرپل ذهاب
- County
- Location of Sarpol-e Zahab County in Kermanshah province (left, pink)

- Location of Kermanshah province in Iran
- Coordinates: 34°28′N 45°56′E
- Country: Iran
- Province: Kermanshah
- Capital: Sarpol-e Zahab
- Districts: Central, Dasht-e Zahab, Qaleh Shahin

Population (2016)
  - Total: 85,342
- Time zone: UTC+3:30 (IRST)

Sarpol-e Zahab County (Persian: شهرستان سرپل ذهاب) (Note: Also romanized as Šaharestâne Sarpole Zahâb; Kurdish: سه‌رپێڵی زه‌هاو, romanized as Sarpell-i Zahaw and Serpêllî Zehaw) is situated in the Kermanshah province, Iran. Its capital is the city of Sarpol-e Zahab, whose people are adherents of Shia, Sunni and Yarsan.

== History ==
After the 2011 National Census, Jeygaran and Sarqaleh Rural Districts were transferred from Salas-e Babajani County to the Central District. Qaleh Shahin Rural District was separated from the district in the formation of Qaleh Shahin District, including the new Sarab-e Qaleh Shahin Rural District.

After the 2016 census, Dasht-e Zahab, Jeygaran, Posht Tang, and Sarqaleh Rural Districts were separated from the Central District in the formation of Dasht-e Zahab District. In addition, several villages merged to create the village of Kuik.

== Demographics ==
=== Population ===
At the time of the 2006 census, the county's population was 81,428 in 18,233 households. The following census in 2011 counted 85,616 people in 21,677 households. The 2016 census measured the population of the county as 85,342 in 23,696 households.

=== Administrative divisions ===
Sarpol-e Zahab County's population history and administrative structure over three consecutive censuses are shown in the following table.

Sarpol-e Zahab County Population
Administrative Divisions	2006	2011	2016
Central District	81,428	85,193	73,942
Beshiva Pataq RD	6,518	6,407	5,480
Dasht-e Zahab RD	6,925	6,854	6,465
Howmeh-ye Sarpol RD	13,768	16,643	8,360
Jeygaran RD (Note: Transferred from Salas-e Babajani County)			2,032
Posht Tang RD	6,476	6,474	5,582
Qaleh Shahin RD	13,109	13,006	
Sarqaleh RD			542
Sarpol-e Zahab (city)	34,632	35,809	45,481
Dasht-e Zahab District (Note: Established after the 2016 census)			
Dasht-e Zahab RD			
Jeygaran RD			
Posht Tang RD			
Sarqaleh RD			
Qaleh Shahin District			11,265
Qaleh Shahin RD			5,291
Sarab-e Qaleh Shahin RD			5,974
Total	81,428	85,616	85,342
RD = Rural District

== Archaeological findings ==
Archaeologists published in the journal Antiquity in August 2019 about the discovery of a defensive wall named "Gawri wall" or "Gawri Chen Wall" which was found near the present-day Iranian-Iraqi border and stretched about 115 kilometers. It is estimated that the wall was built during the rule of the Parthians or Sasanians.

According to Sajjad Alibeigi, "With an estimated volume of approximately one million cubic meters of stone, it would have required significant resources in terms of workforce, materials and time. Remnants of structures, now destroyed, are visible in places along the wall. These may have been associated turrets [small towers] or buildings."

== See also ==
- Qasr-e Shirin County
- Gilan-e Gharb County
- Dalahu County

== See also ==
Media related to Sarpol-e Zahab County at Wikimedia Commons
