= Central District (Sarpol-e Zahab County) =

District in Kermanshah province, Iran

Central District (Sarpol-e Zahab County) Persian: بخش مرکزی شهرستان سرپل ذهاب
- District
- Location within Iran
- Coordinates: 34°27′06″N 45°54′01″E
- Country: Iran
- Province: Kermanshah
- County: Sarpol-e Zahab
- Capital: Sarpol-e Zahab

Population (2016)
  - Total: 73,942
- Time zone: UTC+3:30 (IRST)

The Central District of Sarpol-e Zahab County (Persian: بخش مرکزی شهرستان سرپل ذهاب) is in Kermanshah province, Iran. Its capital is the city of Sarpol-e Zahab.

== History ==
After the 2011 National Census, Jeygaran and Sarqaleh Rural Districts were transferred from Salas-e Babajani County to the district. Qaleh Shahin Rural District was separated from it in the formation of Qaleh Shahin District, which was divided into two rural districts, including the new Sarab-e Qaleh Shahin Rural District.

After the 2016 census, Dasht-e Zahab, Jeygaran, Posht Tang, and Sarqaleh Rural Districts were separated from the Central District in the establishment of Dasht-e Zahab District.

== Demographics ==
=== Population ===
At the time of the 2006 census, the district's population was 81,428 in 18,233 households. The following census in 2011 counted 85,193 people in 21,600 households. The 2016 census measured the population of the district as 73,942 inhabitants in 20,359 households.

=== Administrative divisions ===
Central District (Sarpol-e Zahab County) Population
Administrative Divisions	2006	2011	2016
Beshiva Pataq RD	6,518	6,407	5,480
Dasht-e Zahab RD (Note: Transferred to Dasht-e Zahab District after the 2016 census)	6,925	6,854	6,465
Howmeh-ye Sarpol RD	13,768	16,643	8,360
Jeygaran RD (Note: Transferred from Salas-e Babajani County; transferred to Dasht-e Zahab District after the 2016 census)			2,032
Posht Tang RD	6,476	6,474	5,582
Qaleh Shahin RD (Note: Transferred to Qaleh Shahin District)	13,109	13,006	
Sarqaleh RD			542
Sarpol-e Zahab (city)	34,632	35,809	45,481
Total	81,428	85,193	73,942
RD = Rural District
