= Sarab =

Sarab or Sar Ab or Sar-e Ab or Sarab-e (Persian: سراب) may refer to:

== Afghanistan ==
- Sarab, Baghlan
- Sarab, Ghazni

== Iran ==
=== Alborz Province ===
- Sarab, Alborz

=== Chaharmahal and Bakhtiari Province ===
- Sarab-e Olya Rural District, Farsan County
- Sarab-e Sofla Rural District, Farsan County

=== East Azerbaijan Province ===
- Sarab, East Azerbaijan
- Sarab County

=== Fars Province ===
- Sarab-e Bahram, Mamasani County
- Sar Ab-e Gojestan, Mamasani County
- Sarab Rud, Mamasani County
- Sarab-e Siah, Rostam County

=== Hamadan Province ===
- Sarab, Hamadan, a village in Kabudarahang County
- Sarab Samen, a village in Malayer County
- Sarab-e Tajar, a village in Malayer County
- Sarab Rural District (Hamadan Province)

=== Ilam Province ===
- Sarab, Ilam
- Sarab Bagh
- Sarab Gur-e Tuti
- Sarab-e Kalak
- Sarab-e Kalak, alternate name of Kalak-e Naqi
- Sarab-e Kalan
- Sarab-e Karzan
- Sarab-e Noql
- Sarab Rural District (Ilam Province)
- Sarab Bagh District
- Sarab Bagh Rural District

=== Isfahan Province ===
- Sarab, Isfahan, a village in Ardestan County

=== Kerman Province ===
- Sarab, Kerman, a village in Jiroft County
- Sarab, Shahr-e Babak, a village in Shahr-e Babak County

=== Kermanshah Province ===
- Sarab-e Harasam, a village in Eslamabad-e Gharb County
- Sarab-e Kulasah, a village in Eslamabad-e Gharb County
- Sarab-e Mileh Sar, a village in Eslamabad-e Gharb County
- Sarab-e Shahini, a village in Eslamabad-e Gharb County
- Sarab-e Shian, a village in Eslamabad-e Gharb County
- Sarab-e Shuhan, a village in Eslamabad-e Gharb County
- Sarab Khoman, a village in Eslamabad-e Gharb County
- Sarab, Gilan-e Gharb, a village in Gilan-e Gharb County
- Sarab Qanbar, a village in Gilan-e Gharb County
- Sar Ab-e Barnaj, a village in Harsin County
- Sarab Badiyeh-ye Olya, a village in Harsin County
- Sarab Badiyeh-ye Sofla, a village in Harsin County
- Sarab-e Bardeh Zanjir-e Olya, a village in Javanrud County
- Sarab-e Bardeh Zanjir-e Sofla, a village in Javanrud County
- Sarab Bas, a village in Javanrud County
- Sarab, Kangavar, a village in Kangavar County
- Sarab-e Baba Ali, a village in Kangavar County
- Sarab-e Dehlor, a village in Kangavar County
- Sarab-e Karian, a village in Kermanshah County
- Sarab Khoshkeh-ye Olya, a village in Kermanshah County
- Sarab Khoshkeh-ye Sofla, a village in Kermanshah County
- Sarab-e Nilufar, a village in Kermanshah County
- Sarab-e Sarin, a village in Kermanshah County
- Sarab-e Shah Hoseyn, a village in Kermanshah County
- Sarab-e Sheleh, a village in Kermanshah County
- Sarab-e Tiran, a village in Kermanshah County
- Sarab-e Garm Garab, a village in Ravansar County
- Sarab, Sahneh, a village in Sahneh County
- Sarab-e Qaleh Shahin, a village in Sarpol-e Zahab County
- Sarab-e Zehab, a village in Sarpol-e Zahab County
- Sarab-e Garm-e Olya, a village in Sarpol-e Zahab County
- Sarab-e Garm-e Sofla, a village in Sarpol-e Zahab County
- Sarab-e Surenabad, a village in Sonqor County
- Sarab Rural District (Kermanshah Province), in Sonqor County

=== Khuzestan Province ===
- Sar Ab, Khuzestan, a village in Izeh County
- Sarab-e Nargesi, a village in Masjed Soleyman County

=== Kohgiluyeh and Boyer-Ahmad Province ===
- Sarab Biz, a village in Basht County
- Sarab-e Khamzan-e Kuchek, a village in Boyer-Ahmad County
- Sarab-e Taveh, a village in Boyer-Ahmad County
- Sarab-e Mugarm, a village in Charam County
- Sarab-e Naniz, a village in Gachsaran County

=== Kurdistan Province ===
- Sarab, Kurdistan, a village in Bijar County
- Sarab-e Dowkal, a village in Dehgolan County
- Sarab-e Hajji Pamoq, a village in Dehgolan County
- Sarab-e Hajji Peymuq, a village in Dehgolan County
- Sarab-e Shahrak-e Olya, a village in Dehgolan County
- Sarab-e-Sureh, a village in Dehgolan County
- Sarab-e Mirza, a village in Divandarreh County
- Sarab-e Qarah Khan, a village in Divandarreh County
- Sarab-e Kam, a village in Kamyaran County
- Sarab-e Qaht, a village in Qorveh County
- Sarab-e Sheykh Hasan, a village in Qorveh County
- Sarab-e Bayanchqolu, a village in Sanandaj County
- Sarab Qamish, a village in Sanandaj County
- Sarab Qamish Rural District, in Sanandaj County

=== Razavi Khorasan Province ===
- Sarab, Khvaf
- Sarab, Quchan
- Sar Ab-e Kushk
- Sar Ab, Torbat-e Jam

=== Sistan and Baluchestan Province ===
- Sarab, Sistan and Baluchestan, a village in Iranshahr County

=== South Khorasan Province ===
- Sarab, Qaen
- Sarab, Sarayan
- Sarab-e Sofla

=== West Azerbaijan Province ===
- Sarab, Bukan, a village in Bukan County

=== Zanjan Province ===
- Sarab, Ijrud, a village in Ijrud County
- Sarab, alternate name of Shur Ab, Ijrud, a village in Ijrud County
- Sarab, Khodabandeh, a village in Khodabandeh County

== Yemen ==
- Sarab, Yemen

== See also ==
- The Mirage (Mahfouz novel) or Al-Sarab, 1948 novel by Naguib Mahfouz
