= Zafaran =

Zafaran may refer to:

- Zafaran, Kermanshah, Iran
- Zafaran-e Olya, village in Kermanshah Province, Iran
- Zafaran-e Sofla, village in Kermanshah Province, Iran
- Zafaran, Qazvin, Iran
- Zaafrane, Tunisia
- Zəfəran, Azerbaijan

== See also ==
- Za'faran (disambiguation)
