= Za'faran =

Za'faran may refer to:

- Zəfəran, village in Baku, Azerbaijan
- Mor Hananyo Monastery, known as the Za'faran, or Saffron Monastery, in southeastern Turkey
- Zafaran, Kermanshah, village in Kermanshah Province, Iran
- Zafaran-e Olya, village in Kermanshah Province, Iran
- Zafaran-e Sofla, village in Kermanshah Province, Iran
- Zafaran, Qazvin, village in Qazvin Province, Iran

== See also ==
- Zafaran (disambiguation)
- Saffron (disambiguation)
