= Bandarabad =

Bandarabad or Bondorabad or Bondarabad (Persian: باندرآباد) may refer to:

- Bandarabad, Kermanshah
- Bandarabad-e Olya, Kermanshah Province
- Bandarabad-e Sofla, Kermanshah Province
- Bondorabad, Yazd
