= Gardangah (disambiguation) =

Gardangah is a village in Kohgiluyeh and Boyer-Ahmad Province, Iran.

Gardangah (Persian: گردنگاه) may also refer to:

- Gardangah-e Quchemi
- Gardangah-e Quchemi, alternate name of Quchemi
- Gardangah-e Shahali
