= Mowmenai =

Mowmenai مومنايي
- Village
- Location within Iran
- Coordinates: 33°50′21″N 46°46′15″E
- Country: Iran
- Province: Kermanshah
- County: Eslamabad-e Gharb
- Bakhsh: Homeyl
- Rural District: Mansuri

Population (2006)
  - Total: 402
- Time zone: UTC+3:30 (IRST)
  - Summer (DST): UTC+4:30 (IRDT)

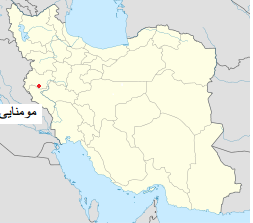
Location of Mowmenai in Iran.

Mowmenai (Persian: مومنايي, also Romanized as Mow’menā’ī and Mūmenā'ī) is a village in Mansuri Rural District, Homeyl District, Eslamabad-e Gharb County, Kermanshah Province, Iran. At the 2006 census, its population was 402, in 91 families.
