= Chahar Meleh-ye Olya =

Chahar Meleh-ye Olya چهارمله عليا
- Village
- Location within Iran
- Coordinates: 33°46′25″N 46°51′08″E
- Country: Iran
- Province: Kermanshah
- County: Eslamabad-e Gharb
- Bakhsh: Homeyl
- Rural District: Mansuri

Population (2006)
  - Total: 58
- Time zone: UTC+3:30 (IRST)
  - Summer (DST): UTC+4:30 (IRDT)

Chahar Meleh-ye Olya (Persian: چهارمله عليا, also romanized as Chahār Meleh-ye ‘Olyā; also known as Chahār Meleh-ye Akbar, Chahār Meleh-ye Bālā, and Chār Meleh-ye Akbar) is a village in Mansuri Rural District, Homeyl District, Eslamabad-e Gharb County, Kermanshah Province, Iran. At the 2006 census, its population was 58, in 16 families.
