= Barikeh-ye Nezam-e Olya =

Barikeh-ye Nezam-e Olya باريكه نظام عليا
- Village
- Location within Iran
- Coordinates: 33°52′50″N 46°47′17″E
- Country: Iran
- Province: Kermanshah
- County: Eslamabad-e Gharb
- Bakhsh: Homeyl
- Rural District: Harasam

Population (2006)
  - Total: 550
- Time zone: UTC+3:30 (IRST)
  - Summer (DST): UTC+4:30 (IRDT)

Barikeh-ye Nezam-e Olya (Persian: باريكه نظام عليا, also Romanized as Bārīkeh-ye Nez̧ām-e ‘Olyā; also known as Bārīkeh-ye Bālā, Bārīkeh-ye Nez̧ām, Bārīkeh-ye ‘Olyā, Qal‘eh Āgha Nizām, and Qal‘eh-ye Āqā Nez̧ām) is a village in Harasam Rural District, Homeyl District, Eslamabad-e Gharb County, Kermanshah Province, Iran. In the 2006 census, 121 families lived in the village for a population of 550.
