= Visgeh =

Visgeh ويسگه
- Village
- Location within Iran
- Coordinates: 33°49′29″N 46°53′29″E
- Country: Iran
- Province: Kermanshah
- County: Eslamabad-e Gharb
- Bakhsh: Homeyl
- Rural District: Harasam

Population (2006)
  - Total: 140
- Time zone: UTC+3:30 (IRST)
  - Summer (DST): UTC+4:30 (IRDT)

Visgeh (Persian: ويسگه, also Romanized as Vīsgeh and Vīsegeh; also known as Veysekeh and Vīsekeh) is a village in Harasam Rural District, Homeyl District, Eslamabad-e Gharb County, Kermanshah Province, Iran. At the 2006 census, its population was 140, consisting of 32 families.
