= Siah Pelah =

Siah Pelah or Siah Peleh (Persian: سياه پله) may refer to:

- Siah Peleh-ye Olya
- Siah Pelah-ye Ommid Olya
- Siah Peleh-ye Sofla, Kermanshah
