= Badreh Gerd-e Salimi =

Badreh Gerd-e Salimi بدره گردسليمي
- Village
- Location within Iran
- Coordinates: 33°56′54″N 46°44′53″E
- Country: Iran
- Province: Kermanshah
- County: Eslamabad-e Gharb
- Bakhsh: Homeyl
- Rural District: Homeyl

Population (2006)
  - Total: 60
- Time zone: UTC+3:30 (IRST)
  - Summer (DST): UTC+4:30 (IRDT)

Badreh Gerd-e Salimi (Persian: بدره گردسليمي, also Romanized as Badreh Gerd-e Salīmī; also known as Badregerd-e Salīmī and Badreh Gerd) is a village in Homeyl Rural District, Homeyl District, Eslamabad-e Gharb County, Kermanshah Province, Iran. At the 2006 census, its population was 60, in 15 families.
