= Mileh Sar =

Mileh Sar ميله سر
- Village
- Location within Iran
- Coordinates: 33°57′49″N 46°46′51″E
- Country: Iran
- Province: Kermanshah
- County: Eslamabad-e Gharb
- Bakhsh: Homeyl
- Rural District: Homeyl

Population (2006)
  - Total: 707
- Time zone: UTC+3:30 (IRST)
  - Summer (DST): UTC+4:30 (IRDT)

Mileh Sar (Persian: ميله سر, also Romanized as Mīleh Sar) is a village in Homeyl Rural District, Homeyl District, Eslamabad-e Gharb County, Kermanshah Province, Iran. At the 2006 census, its population was 707, in 157 families.
