= Rutavand =

Rutavand or Rutvand or Rutevand or Rootvand (Persian: روتوند) may refer to:

- Rutavand, Eslamabad-e Gharb
- Rutvand-e Ardeshir (disambiguation), villages in Gilan-e Gharb County
- Rutavand, Ravansar
