= Ganj Darreh =

Ganj Darreh (Persian: گنج دره) may refer to:

- Ganj Dareh, an archaeological site in Kermanshah Province, Iran
- Ganj Darreh-ye Olya, a village in Lorestan Province, Iran
- Ganj Darreh-ye Sofla, a village in Lorestan Province, Iran
