= Sarbekuh =

Sarbekuh سربكوه
- Village
- Location within Iran
- Coordinates: 33°54′04″N 46°42′29″E
- Country: Iran
- Province: Kermanshah
- County: Eslamabad-e Gharb
- Bakhsh: Homeyl
- Rural District: Mansuri

Population (2006)
  - Total: 56
- Time zone: UTC+3:30 (IRST)
  - Summer (DST): UTC+4:30 (IRDT)

Sarbekuh (Persian: سربكوه, also Romanized as Sarbekūh and Sorbakūh) is a village in Mansuri Rural District, Homeyl District, Eslamabad-e Gharb County, Kermanshah Province, Iran. At the 2006 census, its population was 56, in 11 families.
