= Sarabia =

Sarabia may refer to:

People

- Álvaro Sarabia (born 1978), Chilean footballer
- Daniel Sarabia (born 1984), Cuban ballet dancer
- Eder Sarabia (born 1980), Spanish football manager and former player
- Francisco Antolínez de Sarabia (born 1644), Spanish painter
- Ignacio Sarabia (born 1983), Mexican cyclist
- Jesús Sarabia (born 1946), Mexican cyclist
- José Enrique Sarabia (born 1940), Venezuelan poet, musician, publicist, and television producer
- Manuel Sarabia (born 1957), Spanish retired footballer
- Pablo Sarabia (born 1992), Spanish footballer
- Pedro Sarabia (born 1975), Paraguay football manager and former player
- Rolando Sarabia (born 1982), Cuban ballet dancer
- Simeón Cuba Sarabia (1935–1967), member of the Ñancahuazú guerrilla column led by Che Guevara in Bolivia
- Víctor Hugo Sarabia (born 1983), Chilean footballer

Places

- Sarabia River, river of Mexico
- Estación Sarabia, a town in Oaxaca, Mexico
- Francisco Sarabia International Airport, international airport in Torreón, Coahuila, Mexico
- Francisco Sarabia National Airport, national airport located at Tuxtla Gutiérrez, Chiapas, Mexico

== See also ==
- Bessarabia
- Sarab (disambiguation)
- Sarabian
- Sarbia (disambiguation)
- Sharabian
