= Tulabi, Kermanshah =

Tulabi تولابي
- Village
- Location within Iran
- Coordinates: 33°52′47″N 46°47′37″E
- Country: Iran
- Province: Kermanshah
- County: Eslamabad-e Gharb
- Bakhsh: Homeyl
- Rural District: Harasam

Population (2006)
  - Total: 585
- Time zone: UTC+3:30 (IRST)
  - Summer (DST): UTC+4:30 (IRDT)

Tulabi (Persian: تولابي, also Romanized as Tūlābī and Ţūlābī; also known as Ţūlābī Harāsam) is a village in Harasam Rural District, Homeyl District, Eslamabad-e Gharb County, Kermanshah Province, Iran. At the 2006 census, its population was 585, in 131 families.
