= Meleh Har =

Meleh Har مله هار
- Village
- Location within Iran
- Coordinates: 33°46′39″N 46°56′45″E
- Country: Iran
- Province: Kermanshah
- County: Eslamabad-e Gharb
- Bakhsh: Homeyl
- Rural District: Harasam

Population (2006)
  - Total: 450
- Time zone: UTC+3:30 (IRST)
  - Summer (DST): UTC+4:30 (IRDT)

Meleh Har (Persian: مله هار, also Romanized as Meleh Hār; also known as Meleh Hār-e Dīzgarān, and Meleh Hāy-ye Dīzgarān) is a village in Harasam Rural District, Homeyl District, Eslamabad-e Gharb County, Kermanshah Province, Iran. At the 2006 census, its population was 450, in 100 families.
