= Davar Dar Mian-e Sofla =

Davar Dar Mian-e Sofla دواردرميان سفلي
- Village
- Location within Iran
- Coordinates: 33°47′47″N 46°45′10″E
- Country: Iran
- Province: Kermanshah
- County: Eslamabad-e Gharb
- Bakhsh: Homeyl
- Rural District: Mansuri

Population (2006)
  - Total: 148
- Time zone: UTC+3:30 (IRST)
  - Summer (DST): UTC+4:30 (IRDT)

Davar Dar Mian-e Sofla (Persian: دواردرميان سفلي, also Romanized as Dāvar Dar Mīān-e Soflá; also known as Davār Bamīān, Davār Dar Mīān, and Dāvar Dar Mīān) is a village in Mansuri Rural District, Homeyl District, Eslamabad-e Gharb County, Kermanshah Province, Iran. At the 2006 census, its population was 148, in 31 families.
