= Toveh Sorkhak =

Toveh Sorkhak or Toveh-ye Sorkhak (Persian: توه سرخك), also rendered as Tuvehsorkhak or Tovahsorkhak or Tuh-e Sorkhak, may refer to:

- Toveh Sorkhak-e Nesar
- Toveh Sorkhak-e Olya
- Toveh Sorkhak-e Sofla
