= Qolaji-ye Fatabeygi =

Qolaji-ye Fatabeygi قلاجي فتابيگي
- Village
- Location within Iran
- Coordinates: 33°52′22″N 46°45′47″E
- Country: Iran
- Province: Kermanshah
- County: Eslamabad-e Gharb
- Bakhsh: Homeyl
- Rural District: Mansuri

Population (2006)
  - Total: 44
- Time zone: UTC+3:30 (IRST)
  - Summer (DST): UTC+4:30 (IRDT)

Qolaji-ye Fatabeygi (Persian: قلاجي فتابيگي, also Romanized as Qolājī-ye Fatābeygī; also known as Kalāji, Qolājī, and Qollājī) is a village in Mansuri Rural District, Homeyl District, Eslamabad-e Gharb County, Kermanshah Province, Iran. At the 2006 census, its population was 44, in 9 families.
