= Meleh Sorkh =

Meleh Sorkh مله سرخ
- Village
- Location within Iran
- Coordinates: 33°57′17″N 46°55′33″E
- Country: Iran
- Province: Kermanshah
- County: Eslamabad-e Gharb
- Bakhsh: Homeyl
- Rural District: Homeyl

Population (2006)
  - Total: 283
- Time zone: UTC+3:30 (IRST)
  - Summer (DST): UTC+4:30 (IRDT)

Meleh Sorkh (Persian: مله سرخ; also known as Mīleh Sorkh-e Soflá) is a village in Homeyl Rural District, Homeyl District, Eslamabad-e Gharb County, Kermanshah Province, Iran. At the 2006 census, its population was 283, in 68 families.
