= Kamalgir =

Kamalgir كمالگير
- Village
- Location within Iran
- Coordinates: 33°44′29″N 46°52′02″E
- Country: Iran
- Province: Kermanshah
- County: Eslamabad-e Gharb
- Bakhsh: Homeyl
- Rural District: Mansuri

Population (2006)
  - Total: 93
- Time zone: UTC+3:30 (IRST)
  - Summer (DST): UTC+4:30 (IRDT)

Kamalgir (Persian: كمالگير, also Romanized as Kamālgīr; also known as Jamālgīr and Kamāngīr) is a village in Mansuri Rural District, Homeyl District, Eslamabad-e Gharb County, Kermanshah Province, Iran. At the 2006 census, its population was 93, in 18 families.
