= Tumianeh =

Tumianeh توميانه
- Village
- Location within Iran
- Coordinates: 33°59′05″N 46°46′47″E
- Country: Iran
- Province: Kermanshah
- County: Eslamabad-e Gharb
- Bakhsh: Homeyl
- Rural District: Homeyl

Population (2006)
  - Total: 292
- Time zone: UTC+3:30 (IRST)
  - Summer (DST): UTC+4:30 (IRDT)

Tumianeh (Persian: توميانه, also Romanized as Tūmīāneh; also known as Tomīāneh) is a village in Homeyl Rural District, Homeyl District, Eslamabad-e Gharb County, Kermanshah Province, Iran. At the 2006 census, its population was 292, in 67 families.
