= Chahar Meleh-ye Sofla =

Chahar Meleh-ye Sofla چهارمله سفلي
- Village
- Location within Iran
- Coordinates: 33°45′20″N 46°53′06″E
- Country: Iran
- Province: Kermanshah
- County: Eslamabad-e Gharb
- Bakhsh: Homeyl
- Rural District: Mansuri

Population (2006)
  - Total: 163
- Time zone: UTC+3:30 (IRST)
  - Summer (DST): UTC+4:30 (IRDT)

Chahar Meleh-ye Sofla (Persian: چهارمله سفلي, also Romanized as Chahār Meleh-ye Soflá; also known as Chahār Meleh-ye ‘Arab and Chahār Meleh-ye Pā’īn) is a village in Mansuri Rural District, Homeyl District, Eslamabad-e Gharb County, Kermanshah Province, Iran. At the 2006 census, its population was 163, in 35 families.
