= Sarab-e Garm =

Sarab-e Garm or Sarab Garm or Sarabgarm (Persian: سراب گرم) may refer to:

- Sarab-e Garm Garab
- Sarab-e Garm-e Olya
- Sarab-e Garm-e Sofla
