= Shaghol-e Bahar Ab =

Shaghol-e Bahar Ab شغل بهاراب
- Village
- Location within Iran
- Coordinates: 33°48′51″N 46°43′18″E
- Country: Iran
- Province: Kermanshah
- County: Eslamabad-e Gharb
- Bakhsh: Homeyl
- Rural District: Mansuri

Population (2006)
  - Total: 58
- Time zone: UTC+3:30 (IRST)
  - Summer (DST): UTC+4:30 (IRDT)

Shaghol-e Bahar Ab (Persian: شغل بهاراب, also Romanized as Shaghol-e Bahār Āb; also known as Shākhol-e Bahār Āb and Shaqol-e Bahār Āb) is a village in Mansuri Rural District, Homeyl District, Eslamabad-e Gharb County, Kermanshah Province, Iran. At the 2006 census, its population was 58, in 11 families.
