= Khapgah =

Khapgah shian خپگه شیان
- Village
- Location within Iran
- Coordinates: 33°59′57″N 46°47′56″E
- Country: Iran
- Province: Kermanshah
- County: Eslamabad-e Gharb
- Bakhsh: Homeyl
- Rural District: Homeyl

Population (2025)
  - Total: 2,750
- Time zone: UTC+3:30 (IRST)
  - Summer (DST): UTC+4:30 (IRDT)

Khapgah shian (Persian: خپگه; also known as Ḩapgah-e Shīān and Khapgah Shī’ān) is a village in Homeyl Rural District, Homeyl District, Eslamabad-e Gharb County, Kermanshah Province, Iran. At the 2006 census, its population was 2,750, in 800 families.
