= Sarab-e Shuhan =

Sarab-e Shuhan سراب شوهان
- Village
- Location within Iran
- Coordinates: 34°00′01″N 46°48′04″E
- Country: Iran
- Province: Kermanshah
- County: Eslamabad-e Gharb
- Bakhsh: Homeyl
- Rural District: Homeyl

Population (2006)
  - Total: 204
- Time zone: UTC+3:30 (IRST)
  - Summer (DST): UTC+4:30 (IRDT)

Sarab-e Shuhan (Persian: سراب شوهان, also Romanized as Sarāb-e Shūhān) is a village in Homeyl Rural District, Homeyl District, Eslamabad-e Gharb County, Kermanshah Province, Iran. At the 2006 census, its population was 204, in 50 families.
