= Dizgaran =

Dizgaran or Dizgeran or Dizgoran (Persian: ديزگران) may refer to:

- Dizgaran, Kermanshah
- Dizgaran, Eslamabad-e Gharb, Kermanshah Province
