= Sarab-e Mileh Sar =

Sarab-e Mileh Sar سراب ميله سر
- Village
- Location within Iran
- Coordinates: 34°00′05″N 46°48′10″E
- Country: Iran
- Province: Kermanshah
- County: Eslamabad-e Gharb
- Bakhsh: Homeyl
- Rural District: Homeyl

Population (2006)
  - Total: 369
- Time zone: UTC+3:30 (IRST)
  - Summer (DST): UTC+4:30 (IRDT)

Sarab-e Mileh Sar (Persian: سراب ميله سر, also Romanized as Sarāb-e Mīleh Sar) is a village in Homeyl Rural District, Homeyl District, Eslamabad-e Gharb County, Kermanshah Province, Iran. At the 2006 census, its population was 369, in 93 families.
