= Mian Choqa, Kermanshah =

Mian Choqa ميان چقا
- Village
- Location within Iran
- Coordinates: 33°50′01″N 46°45′36″E
- Country: Iran
- Province: Kermanshah
- County: Eslamabad-e Gharb
- Bakhsh: Homeyl
- Rural District: Mansuri

Population (2006)
  - Total: 92
- Time zone: UTC+3:30 (IRST)
  - Summer (DST): UTC+4:30 (IRDT)

Mian Choqa (Persian: ميان چقا, also Romanized as Mīān Choqā, Mīān Chaqā, and Mīyān Cheqā) is a village in Mansuri Rural District, Homeyl District, Eslamabad-e Gharb County, Kermanshah Province, Iran. At the 2006 census, its population was 92, in 20 families.
