= Siah Peleh-ye Sofla, Kermanshah =

Siah Peleh-ye Sofla سياه پله سفلي
- Village
- Location within Iran
- Coordinates: 33°49′00″N 46°43′00″E
- Country: Iran
- Province: Kermanshah
- County: Eslamabad-e Gharb
- Bakhsh: Homeyl
- Rural District: Mansuri

Population (2006)
  - Total: 43
- Time zone: UTC+3:30 (IRST)
  - Summer (DST): UTC+4:30 (IRDT)

Siah Peleh-ye Sofla (Persian: سياه پله سفلي, also Romanized as Sīāh Peleh-ye Soflá) is a village in Mansuri Rural District, Homeyl District, Eslamabad-e Gharb County, Kermanshah Province, Iran. At the 2006 census, its population was 43, in 12 families.
