= Cheshmeh Sangi, Eslamabad-e Gharb =

Cheshmeh Sangi چشمه سنگي
- Village
- Location within Iran
- Coordinates: 33°55′25″N 46°42′07″E
- Country: Iran
- Province: Kermanshah
- County: Eslamabad-e Gharb
- Bakhsh: Homeyl
- Rural District: Mansuri

Population (2006)
  - Total: 625
- Time zone: UTC+3:30 (IRST)
  - Summer (DST): UTC+4:30 (IRDT)

Cheshmeh Sangi (Persian: چشمه سنگي, also Romanized as Cheshmeh Sangī) is a village in Mansuri Rural District, Homeyl District, Eslamabad-e Gharb County, Kermanshah Province, Iran. At the 2006 census, its population was 625, in 136 families.
