= Riblak =

Riblak (Persian: ري بلك), also known as Rah Balag or Rahbalak or Ribalag, may refer to:

- Riblak-e Olya
- Riblak-e Sofla
