= Toveh Sorkhak-e Sofla =

Toveh Sorkhak-e Sofla توه سرخك سفلي
- Village
- Location within Iran
- Coordinates: 33°58′27″N 46°49′20″E
- Country: Iran
- Province: Kermanshah
- County: Eslamabad-e Gharb
- Bakhsh: Homeyl
- Rural District: Homeyl

Population (2006)
  - Total: 706
- Time zone: UTC+3:30 (IRST)
  - Summer (DST): UTC+4:30 (IRDT)

Toveh Sorkhak-e Sofla (Persian: توه سرخك سفلي, also Romanized as Toveh Sorkhak-e Soflá; also known as Tovasorkhak-e Soflá and Tūh-e Sorkhak) is a village in Homeyl Rural District, Homeyl District, Eslamabad-e Gharb County, Kermanshah Province, Iran. At the 2006 census, its population was 706, in 147 families.
