= Sarab-e Bardeh Zanjir =

Sarab-e Bardeh Zanjir (Persian: سراب برده زنجير), also rendered as Sarab-e Bard Zanjir, may refer to:

- Sarab-e Bardeh Zanjir-e Olya
- Sarab-e Bardeh Zanjir-e Sofla
