= Darbid-e Mansuri =

Village in Kermanshah province, Iran

Darbid-e Mansuri Persian: داربيدمنصوري
- Village
- Location within Iran
- Coordinates: 33°51′08″N 46°44′32″E
- Country: Iran
- Province: Kermanshah
- County: Eslamabad-e Gharb
- District: Homeyl
- Rural District: Mansuri

Population (2016)
  - Total: 410
- Time zone: UTC+3:30 (IRST)

Darbid-e Mansuri (Persian: داربيدمنصوري) (Note: Also romanized as Dārbīd-e Manşūrī; also known as Dārbīd) is a village in, and the capital of, Mansuri Rural District of Homeyl District, Eslamabad-e Gharb County, Kermanshah province, Iran.

== Demographics ==
=== Population ===
At the time of the 2006 National Census, the village's population was 467 in 103 households. The following census in 2011 counted 444 people in 114 households. The 2016 census measured the population of the village as 410 people in 135 households.
