= Barikeh-ye Sofla =

Barikeh-ye Sofla (Persian: باريكه سفلي) may refer to:

- Barikeh-ye Sofla, Ilam
- Barikeh-ye Sofla, Kermanshah
