= Riblak-e Olya =

Riblak-e Olya ري بلك عليا
- Village
- Location within Iran
- Coordinates: 33°48′19″N 46°55′09″E
- Country: Iran
- Province: Kermanshah
- County: Eslamabad-e Gharb
- Bakhsh: Homeyl
- Rural District: Harasam

Population (2006)
  - Total: 174
- Time zone: UTC+3:30 (IRST)
  - Summer (DST): UTC+4:30 (IRDT)

Riblak-e Olya (Persian: ري بلك عليا, also Romanized as Rīblak-e ‘Olyā; also known as Rāh Balag-e‘Olyā, Rāhbalak-e Bālā, and Rībalag-e ‘Olyā) is a village in Harasam Rural District, Homeyl District, Eslamabad-e Gharb County, Kermanshah Province, Iran. At the 2006 census, its population was 174, in 41 families.
