= Ganjereh =

Ganjereh (Persian: گنجره) may refer to:

- Ganjereh-ye Olya
- Ganjereh-ye Vosta
