= Garvani =

Village in Kermanshah province, Iran

Garvani Persian: گارواني
- Village
- Location within Iran
- Coordinates: 33°55′57″N 46°45′48″E
- Country: Iran
- Province: Kermanshah
- County: Eslamabad-e Gharb
- District: Homeyl
- Rural District: Mansuri

Population (2016)
  - Total: 513
- Time zone: UTC+3:30 (IRST)

Garvani (Persian: گارواني) (Note: Also romanized as Gārvānī; also known as Gārūnī, Gaurawani, and Gāv Ravānī) is a village in Mansuri Rural District of Homeyl District, Eslamabad-e Gharb County, Kermanshah province, Iran.

== Demographics ==
=== Population ===
At the time of the 2006 National Census, the village's population was 487 in 104 households. The following census in 2011 counted 518 people in 134 households. The 2016 census measured the population of the village as 513 people in 162 households. It was the most populous village in its rural district.
