= Sarabadiyeh =

Sarabadiyeh (Persian: سراباديه), also rendered as Sarab Badiyeh or Sar Abadeyeh or Sarab-e Badieh or Sarab-e Badiyeh, may refer to:

- Sarabadiyeh-ye Olya
- Sarabadiyeh-ye Sofla
