= Manavari, Kermanshah =

Manavari منوري
- Village
- Location within Iran
- Coordinates: 33°49′54″N 46°52′38″E
- Country: Iran
- Province: Kermanshah
- County: Eslamabad-e Gharb
- Bakhsh: Homeyl
- Rural District: Harasam

Population (2006)
  - Total: 109
- Time zone: UTC+3:30 (IRST)
  - Summer (DST): UTC+4:30 (IRDT)

Manavari (Persian: منوري, also Romanized as Manāvarī, Manavvarī, and Manūrī; also known as Manavvarī Dīzgarān) is a village in Harasam Rural District, Homeyl District, Eslamabad-e Gharb County, Kermanshah Province, Iran. At the 2006 census, its population was 109, in 27 families.
