= Monavari =

Monavari or Munavari or Manavari or Manavvari or Manuri (Persian: منوري) may refer to:

- Manavari, Kermanshah
- Monavari, South Khorasan
