= Qaleh Tork-e Olya =

Qaleh Tork-e Olya قلعه ترك عليا
- Village
- Location within Iran
- Coordinates: 33°47′09″N 46°56′18″E
- Country: Iran
- Province: Kermanshah
- County: Eslamabad-e Gharb
- Bakhsh: Homeyl
- Rural District: Harasam

Population (2006)
  - Total: 181
- Time zone: UTC+3:30 (IRST)
  - Summer (DST): UTC+4:30 (IRDT)

Qaleh Tork-e Olya (Persian: قلعه ترك عليا, also Romanized as Qal‘eh Tork-e ‘Olyā; also known as Qal‘a Turk, Qal‘eh Turk, and Qal‘eh-ye Tork) is a village in Harasam Rural District, Homeyl District, Eslamabad-e Gharb County, Kermanshah Province, Iran. At the 2006 census, its population was 181, in 40 families.
