= Harasam =

Harasam (Persian: هرسم) may refer to:

- Qaleh-ye Harasam
- Harasam Rural District
