= Barikeh-ye Sadeqi =

Barikeh-ye Sadeqi باريكه صادقي
- Village
- Location within Iran
- Coordinates: 33°52′56″N 46°47′02″E
- Country: Iran
- Province: Kermanshah
- County: Eslamabad-e Gharb
- Bakhsh: Homeyl
- Rural District: Harasam

Population (2006)
  - Total: 209
- Time zone: UTC+3:30 (IRST)
  - Summer (DST): UTC+4:30 (IRDT)

Barikeh-ye Sadeqi (Persian: باريكه صادقي, also Romanized as Bārīkeh-ye Şādeqī; also known as Bārīkeh-ye Pā’īn, Bārīkeh-ye Şādeq, Bārīkeh-ye Soflá, Bārīkey-ye Şādeqī-ye Soflá, Qal‘a Shaikh Sadiq, and Sheykh Şādeq) is a village in Harasam Rural District, Homeyl District, Eslamabad-e Gharb County, Kermanshah Province, Iran. At the 2006 census, its population was 209, in 44 families.
