= Kandeh-ye Har =

Village in Kermanshah province, Iran

Kandeh-ye Har Persian: كنده هر
- Village
- Location within Iran
- Coordinates: 33°53′16″N 46°52′32″E
- Country: Iran
- Province: Kermanshah
- County: Eslamabad-e Gharb
- District: Homeyl
- Rural District: Harasam

Population (2016)
  - Total: 1,089
- Time zone: UTC+3:30 (IRST)

Kandeh-ye Har (Persian: كنده هر) (Note: Also known as Gandehar, Kandahar, Kand-e Har, Kandhar, and Kanhar) is a village in Harasam Rural District of Homeyl District, Eslamabad-e Gharb County, Kermanshah province, Iran.

== Demographics ==
=== Population ===
At the time of the 2006 National Census, the village's population was 1,399 in 320 households. The following census in 2011 counted 1,388 people in 388 households. The 2016 census measured the population of the village as 1,089 people in 313 households. It was the most populous village in its rural district.
