= Riblak-e Sofla =

Riblak-e Sofla ري بلك سفلي
- Village
- Location within Iran
- Coordinates: 33°48′43″N 46°54′46″E
- Country: Iran
- Province: Kermanshah
- County: Eslamabad-e Gharb
- Bakhsh: Homeyl
- Rural District: Harasam

Population (2006)
  - Total: 193
- Time zone: UTC+3:30 (IRST)
  - Summer (DST): UTC+4:30 (IRDT)

Riblak-e Sofla (Persian: ري بلك سفلي, also Romanized as Rīblak-e Soflá; also known as Rāh Balag-e Soflá and Rībalag-e Soflá) is a village in Harasam Rural District, Homeyl District, Eslamabad-e Gharb County, Kermanshah Province, Iran. At the 2006 census, its population was 193, in 41 families.
