= Gordi, Iran =

Gordi گردي
- Village
- Location within Iran
- Coordinates: 33°50′10″N 46°52′11″E
- Country: Iran
- Province: Kermanshah
- County: Eslamabad-e Gharb
- Bakhsh: Homeyl
- Rural District: Harasam

Population (2006)
  - Total: 100
- Time zone: UTC+3:30 (IRST)
  - Summer (DST): UTC+4:30 (IRDT)

Gordi (Persian: گردي, also Romanized as Gordī; also known as Garmī and Gordī-ye Dīzgarān) is a village in Harasam Rural District, Homeyl District, Eslamabad-e Gharb County, Kermanshah Province, Iran. At the 2006 census, its population was 100, in 24 families.
