= Qaleh Tork =

Qaleh Tork or Qaleh-ye Tork or Qala Turk or Qaleh Turk (Persian: قلعه ترك) may refer to:

- Qaleh Tork-e Olya
- Qaleh Tork-e Sofla
