= Rutavand, Eslamabad-e Gharb =

Rutavand روتوند
- Village
- Location within Iran
- Coordinates: 33°52′19″N 46°46′27″E
- Country: Iran
- Province: Kermanshah
- County: Eslamabad-e Gharb
- Bakhsh: Homeyl
- Rural District: Mansuri

Population (2006)
  - Total: 150
- Time zone: UTC+3:30 (IRST)
  - Summer (DST): UTC+4:30 (IRDT)

Rutavand (Persian: روتوند, also Romanized as Rūtavand, Rootvand, Rūtvand; also known as Rūtāvand Harsam and Saiyidha Dawetahwand) is a village in Mansuri Rural District, Homeyl District, Eslamabad-e Gharb County, Kermanshah Province, Iran. At the 2006 census, its population was 150, in 28 families.
