= Aliabad-e Dizgoran =

Aliabad-e Dizgoran علي ابادديزگران
- Village
- Location within Iran
- Coordinates: 33°48′50″N 46°54′32″E
- Country: Iran
- Province: Kermanshah
- County: Eslamabad-e Gharb
- Bakhsh: Homeyl
- Rural District: Harasam

Population (2006)
  - Total: 245
- Time zone: UTC+3:30 (IRST)
  - Summer (DST): UTC+4:30 (IRDT)

Aliabad-e Dizgoran (Persian: علي ابادديزگران, also Romanized as ‘Alīābād-e Dīzgorān; also known as ‘Alīābād, Dizgaran, Dīzgerān, Qal’a Aliabad, and Qal‘eh ‘Aliābād) is a village in Harasam Rural District, Homeyl District, Eslamabad-e Gharb County, Kermanshah Province, Iran. At the 2006 census, its population was 245, in 56 families.
