= Toveh Sorkhak-e Olya =

Toveh Sorkhak-e Olya توه سرخك عليا
- Village
- Location within Iran
- Coordinates: 33°58′16″N 46°50′29″E
- Country: Iran
- Province: Kermanshah
- County: Eslamabad-e Gharb
- Bakhsh: Homeyl
- Rural District: Homeyl

Population (2006)
  - Total: 195
- Time zone: UTC+3:30 (IRST)
  - Summer (DST): UTC+4:30 (IRDT)

Toveh Sorkhak-e Olya (Persian: توه سرخك عليا, also Romanized as Toveh Sorkhak-e ‘Olyā; also known as Tovasorkhak-e ‘Olyā, Toveh Sorkhak, Toveh Sorkhak-e ‘Olyā Bar Āftāb, Toveh-ye Sorkhak, Tua Sarkhak, Tū Sorkhak-e Ḩajj Valī, Tuvehsorkhak, Tū-ye Sari Khak, Tu yi Sār-i-Khāk, Zanganeh, and Zangeneh) is a village in Homeyl Rural District, Homeyl District, Eslamabad-e Gharb County, Kermanshah Province, Iran. At the 2006 census, its population was 195, in 38 families.
