= Sarab-e Harasam =

Sarab-e Harasam سراب هرسم
- Village
- Location within Iran
- Coordinates: 33°51′24″N 46°51′15″E
- Country: Iran
- Province: Kermanshah
- County: Eslamabad-e Gharb
- Bakhsh: Homeyl
- Rural District: Harasam

Population (2006)
  - Total: 522
- Time zone: UTC+3:30 (IRST)
  - Summer (DST): UTC+4:30 (IRDT)

Sarab-e Harasam (Persian: سراب هرسم, also Romanized as Sarāb-e Harasam and Sarāb-e Harasm) is a village in Harasam Rural District, Homeyl District, Eslamabad-e Gharb County, Kermanshah Province, Iran. At the 2006 census, its population was 522, in 126 families.
