= Quchemi =

Quchemi قوچمي
- Village
- Location within Iran
- Coordinates: 33°56′52″N 46°46′46″E
- Country: Iran
- Province: Kermanshah
- County: Eslamabad-e Gharb
- Bakhsh: Homeyl
- Rural District: Homeyl

Population (2006)
  - Total: 384
- Time zone: UTC+3:30 (IRST)
  - Summer (DST): UTC+4:30 (IRDT)

Quchemi (Persian: قوچمي, also Romanized as Qūchemī; also known as Gardangāh-e Qūchemī, Kuchimi, Kūshemī, Qūchī-ye Nāmdār, and Qūchmī-ye Nāmdār) is a village in Homeyl Rural District, Homeyl District, Eslamabad-e Gharb County, Kermanshah Province, Iran. At the 2006 census, its population was 384, in 82 families.
