= Sarab Khoshkeh =

Sarab Khoshkeh (Persian: سراب خشكه) may refer to:

- Sarab Khoshkeh-ye Olya
- Sarab Khoshkeh-ye Sofla
