= Shahbodagh =

Village in Kermanshah province, Iran

Shahbodagh Persian: شاهبداغ
- Village
- Location within Iran
- Coordinates: 33°45′00″N 46°58′31″E
- Country: Iran
- Province: Kermanshah
- County: Eslamabad-e Gharb
- District: Homeyl
- Rural District: Harasam

Population (2016)
  - Total: 280
- Time zone: UTC+3:30 (IRST)

Shahbodagh (Persian: شاهبداغ) (Note: Also romanized as Shāhbodāgh; formerly Shad Bolagh (شادبلاغ), also romanized as Shād Bolāgh) is a village in Harasam Rural District of Homeyl District, Eslamabad-e Gharb County, Kermanshah province, Iran.

== Demographics ==
=== Population ===
At the time of the 2006 National Census, the village's population was 293 in 59 households. The following census in 2011 counted 307 people in 77 households. The 2016 census measured the population of the village as 280 people in 75 households.
