= Palang Gerd =

Palang Gerd پلنگ گرد
- Village
- Location within Iran
- Coordinates: 33°57′40″N 46°47′44″E
- Country: Iran
- Province: Kermanshah
- County: Eslamabad-e Gharb
- Bakhsh: Homeyl
- Rural District: Homeyl

Population (2006)
  - Total: 634
- Time zone: UTC+3:30 (IRST)
  - Summer (DST): UTC+4:30 (IRDT)

Palang Gerd (Persian: پلنگ گرد, also Romanized as Palangerd; also known as Palangird, Palangrād, and Payān Gerd) is a village in Homeyl Rural District, Homeyl District, Eslamabad-e Gharb County, Kermanshah Province, Iran. At the 2006 census, its population was 634, in 144 families.
