= Cheshmeh Sangi =

Cheshmeh Sangi (Persian: چشمه سنگي) may refer to:

- Cheshmeh Sangi, Eslamabad-e Gharb
- Cheshmeh Sangi, Sonqor
