= Bandor =

Bandor (Persian: باندر) may refer to:

- Bandor-e Olya
- Bandor-e Sofla, Kermanshah

== See also ==
- Bandar (disambiguation)
- Bon Dor (disambiguation)
