= Toveh Sorkhak-e Nesar =

Toveh Sorkhak-e Nesar توه سرخك نسار
- Village
- Location within Iran
- Coordinates: 33°58′08″N 46°50′29″E
- Country: Iran
- Province: Kermanshah
- County: Eslamabad-e Gharb
- Bakhsh: Homeyl
- Rural District: Homeyl

Population (2006)
  - Total: 152
- Time zone: UTC+3:30 (IRST)
  - Summer (DST): UTC+4:30 (IRDT)

Toveh Sorkhak-e Nesar (Persian: توه سرخك نسار, also Romanized as Toveh Sorkhak-e Nesār; also known as Tovahsorkhak-e ‘Olyā-e Nesār) is a village in Homeyl Rural District, Homeyl District, Eslamabad-e Gharb County, Kermanshah Province, Iran. At the 2006 census, its population was 152, in 35 families.
