= Zafaran-e Sofla =

Zafaran-e Sofla زعفران سفلي
- Village
- Location within Iran
- Coordinates: 33°52′41″N 46°45′50″E
- Country: Iran
- Province: Kermanshah
- County: Eslamabad-e Gharb
- Bakhsh: Homeyl
- Rural District: Mansuri

Population (2006)
  - Total: 40
- Time zone: UTC+3:30 (IRST)
  - Summer (DST): UTC+4:30 (IRDT)

Zafaran-e Sofla (Persian: زعفران سفلي, also Romanized as Za‘farān-e Soflá; also known as Seyyedmā) is a village in Mansuri Rural District, Homeyl District, Eslamabad-e Gharb County, Kermanshah Province, Iran. There were 8 families and 40 people there according to the 2006 Census.
