= Bandor-e Olya =

Bandor-e Olya بان درعليا
- Village
- Location within Iran
- Coordinates: 33°51′06″N 46°40′53″E
- Country: Iran
- Province: Kermanshah
- County: Eslamabad-e Gharb
- Bakhsh: Homeyl
- Rural District: Mansuri

Population (2006)
  - Total: 242
- Time zone: UTC+3:30 (IRST)
  - Summer (DST): UTC+4:30 (IRDT)

Bandor-e Olya (Persian: بان درعليا, also Romanized as Bāndor-e ‘Olyā; also known as Bandarābād-e Bālā, Bāndarābād-e ‘Olyā, Bāyandor, and Bāyandor-e ‘Olyā) is a village in Mansuri Rural District, Homeyl District, Eslamabad-e Gharb County, Kermanshah Province, Iran. At the 2006 census, its population was 242, in 58 families.
