= Zafaran-e Olya =

Zafaran-e Olya زعفران عليا
- Village
- Location within Iran
- Coordinates: 33°53′42″N 46°45′50″E
- Country: Iran
- Province: Kermanshah
- County: Eslamabad-e Gharb
- Bakhsh: Homeyl
- Rural District: Mansuri

Population (2006)
  - Total: 634
- Time zone: UTC+3:30 (IRST)
  - Summer (DST): UTC+4:30 (IRDT)

Zafaran-e Olya (Persian: زعفران عليا, also Romanized as Za‘farān-e ‘Olyā; also known as Za‘farān) is a village in Mansuri Rural District, Homeyl District, Eslamabad-e Gharb County, Kermanshah Province, Iran. The population was 634 in 147 families as of the 2006 Census.
