= Sar Firuzabad Castle =

Castle in Kermanshah Province, Iran

Sar Firuzabad castle
- قلعه سر فیروزآباد

General information
- Type: Castle
- Location: Eslamabad-e Gharb County, Iran

Sar Firuzabad castle (Persian: قلعه سر فیروزآباد) is a castle in Eslamabad-e Gharb County in Kermanshah Province, Iran, built during the Sasanian Empire (3rd -7th centuries CE).
