= Bandor-e Sofla, Kermanshah =

Bandor-e Sofla باندرسفلي
- Village
- Location within Iran
- Coordinates: 33°50′27″N 46°42′02″E
- Country: Iran
- Province: Kermanshah
- County: Eslamabad-e Gharb
- Bakhsh: Homeyl
- Rural District: Mansuri

Population (2006)
  - Total: 116
- Time zone: UTC+3:30 (IRST)
  - Summer (DST): UTC+4:30 (IRDT)

Bandor-e Sofla (Persian: باندرسفلي, also Romanized as Bāndor-e Soflá; also known as Bandarābād-e Pā’īn, Bāndarābād-e Soflá, and Bāyandor-e Soflá) is a village in Mansuri Rural District, Homeyl District, Eslamabad-e Gharb County, Kermanshah Province, Iran. At the 2006 census, its population was 116, in 29 families.
