= Qaleh-ye Harasam =

Village in Kermanshah province, Iran

Qaleh-ye Harasam Persian: قلعه هرسم
- Village
- Location within Iran
- Coordinates: 33°52′01″N 46°49′51″E
- Country: Iran
- Province: Kermanshah
- County: Eslamabad-e Gharb
- District: Homeyl
- Rural District: Harasam

Population (2016)
  - Total: 368
- Time zone: UTC+3:30 (IRST)

Qaleh-ye Harasam (Persian: قلعه هرسم) (Note: Also romanized as Qal‘eh Harasam and Qal‘eh-ye Harasam; also known as Harasam) is a village in, and the capital of, Harasam Rural District of Homeyl District, Eslamabad-e Gharb County, Kermanshah province, Iran.

== Demographics ==
=== Population ===
At the time of the 2006 National Census, the village's population was 698 in 152 households. The following census in 2011 counted 575 people in 149 households. The 2016 census measured the population of the village as 368 people in 111 households.
