= Mian Choqa =

Mian Choqa or Mian Cheqa or Mian Chaqa (Persian: ميان چقا) may refer to:

- Mian Choqa, Kermanshah
- Mian Choqa, Lorestan
