= Deborah C. Merrett =

Canadian anthropologist

- Citizenship: Canada
- Education: McMaster University September 1969 - April 1973 and July 1994 - April 1996, University of Guelph September 1996 - May 1998, University of Manitoba September 1999 - July 2004, University of Winnipeg September 2004 - August 2006
- Employer(s): Lakehead University, Thunder Bay - Canada

Deborah C. Merrett is a Canadian anthropologist and paleopathologist known for her contributions to the study of ancient human health and the biological responses of early populations to environmental challenges. She has worked extensively on bioarchaeology and paleopathology, specifically focusing on the analysis of health patterns in ancient populations. Merrett's research spans several early human settlements, with notable work at the sites of Ganj Dareh, Iran, and the Late Shang site of Yinxu, China.

== Early life and education ==
Merrett was raised in the town of Deep River, Ontario and completed her undergraduate studies in Anthropology and Biochemistry at McMaster University. She then earned an M.Sc. in Human Kinetics from the University of Guelph, where her work focused on the biomechanics and physiology of early human communities. She later pursued her Ph.D. in Anthropology at the University of Manitoba and received a Postdoctoral Fellowship in Paleopathology at the University of Winnipeg.

== Academic career and research ==
Merrett holds adjunct positions in both the Department of Anthropology at Lakehead University and the Department of Archaeology at Simon Fraser University. Her research primarily involves the study of health and disease in ancient populations and aims to understand the complex interactions between human culture, environmental stressors, and biological responses. Dr Merrett's earliest papers were primarily biochemistry based, however over time her interest began to shift towards anthropological research, and eventually a blending of the two.

One of her most notable contributions was her research at the site of Ganj Dareh in the Zagros Mountains of Iran. Ganj Dareh is an early Neolithic site that provides invaluable insights into the lives of some of the earliest known pastoralist communities. In a groundbreaking 2016 study, Merrett co-authored an analysis that sequenced the genome of an early Neolithic woman from this site, offering rare insights into the genetic composition and health characteristics of Neolithic populations.

== Research ==
Merrett's work has been published in various academic journals and conference proceedings, and her research has been cited extensively in studies of bioarchaeology and paleopathology. In addition to her work at Ganj Dareh, Merrett has investigated post-mortem changes in skeletal remains to understand better the differential weathering patterns between immature and mature bones in experimental burial environments. Deborah C. Merrett has made also significant contributions to Chinese archaeology and bioarchaeology through her research on ancient populations in China. Her work primarily focuses on health patterns, stress indicators, and occupational specializations in early Chinese societies:

- In 2016, Merrett co-authored a study titled "Osteoarchaeological Studies of Human Systemic Stress of Early Urbanization in Late Shang at Anyang, China." This research examined the impact of early urbanization on commoners during the Late Shang dynasty (ca. 1250–1046 B.C.) by analyzing 347 individuals from two different burial contexts in Yinxu.
- In a 2017 study titled "Osteoarthritis, labour division, and occupational specialization of the Late Shang China - insights from Yinxu (ca. 1250 - 1046 B.C.)," Merrett and her colleagues investigated the prevalence of osteoarthritis among individuals from Yinxu, the last capital of the Late Shang dynasty. The research analyzed 167 skeletal remains from two sites, Xiaomintun and Xin'anzhuang, examining osteoarthritis in appendicular joints and spinal indicators.
- Merrett's research also extends to the study of enamel hypoplasia as an indicator of physiological stress in ancient populations. In a study titled "Enamel hypoplasia in Northeast China: Evidence from Houtaomuga," she examined skeletal remains from the Houtaomuga site, dating to 2250–2050 BP. The research focused on the prevalence and duration of linear enamel hypoplasia (LEH) in individuals from this site.
- In a collaborative effort, Merrett contributed to a comprehensive review titled "Human adaptation to Holocene environments: Perspectives and promise from China" which discusses recent archaeological research on human-environment interactions in China during the Holocene epoch.

Merrett has published a number of other works which may be accessed via the researchgate website and through institutions such as Lakehead University, Canada.
