= Gordi =

Gordi may refer to the following:

- Gordi (band), Yugoslav rock band
- Gordi (musician), stage name of Australian folktronica singer/songwriter Sophie Payten
- Gordi, Iran, village in Iran
- Bulgarian frigate Gordi

== See also ==
- Geordie
