= Chia Jani =

Archaeological site in Iran

Coordinates: 33.94795°N 46.78346°E

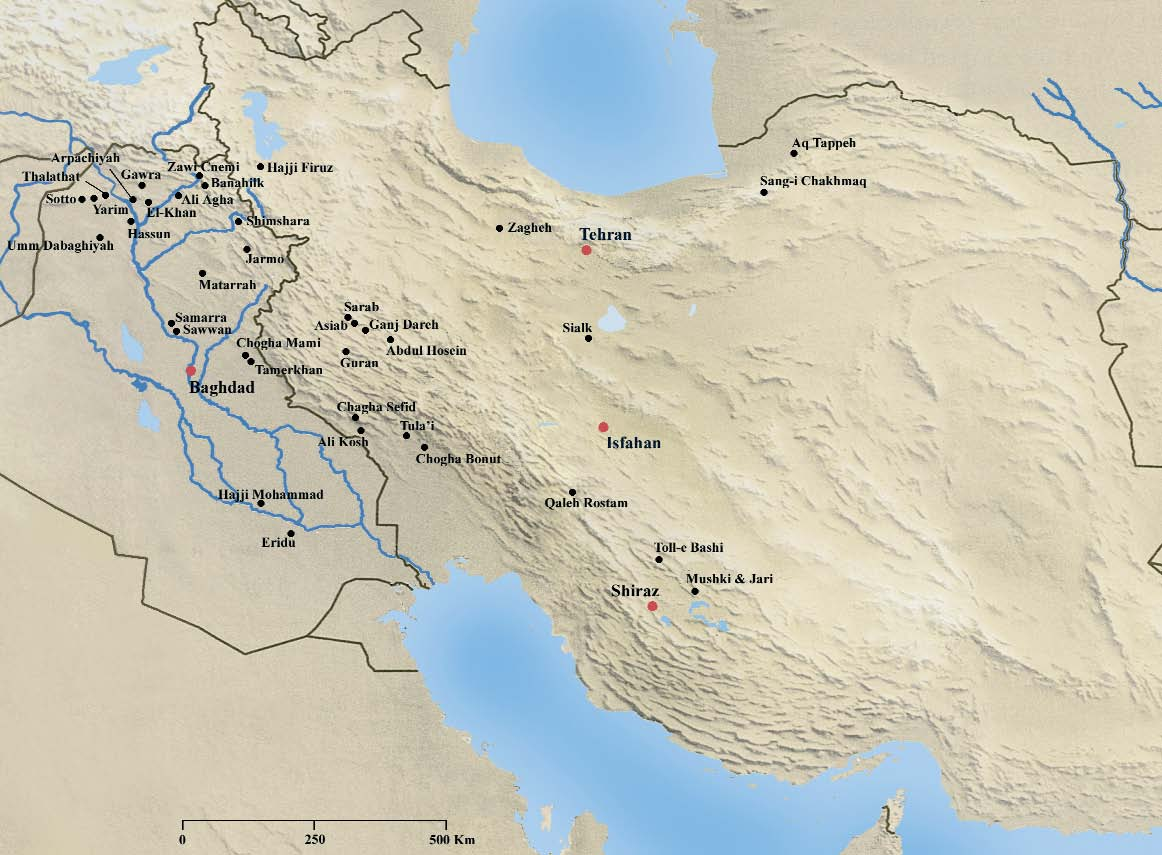
Neolithic sites in Iran

Chia Jani is an archaeological site in Iran's Kermanshah Province. It is located near the village of Palang Gerd, on the Qouchemi stream, which flows to the Ravand River about 3 km (1.9 mi) south, in the south central part of the Islamabad Plain in the west-central Zagros Mountains.

== Excavation ==
The site was discovered by Kamyar Abdi during archaeological surveys of the plain in 1999. The site dates to the early (Aceramic) and middle Neolithic period. Parts of the site are washed off by the Qouchemi stream and damaged due to the expansion of agricultural land. Its lithic industry is characterized by bladelet production, some of which are made from obsidian. Other notable materials include the so-called "tadpole ware" (ca 6000 BC) of the middle Neolithic period and plano-convex bricks reported from early to middle Neolithic sites in the region, including Ganj Dareh and the nearby Sarab, Asiab about 60km northeast, and Jarmo, in Iraq, to the northwest.

Plans for excavations at Chia Jani, funded by a grant from the National Geographic Society, came to a halt with the 2003 invasion of Iraq that rendered Islamabad Plain, only 150 km (93 mi) from the Iraqi border, unsafe for an international archaeological expedition.
