= Gardangah-e Quchemi =

Village in Kermanshah province, Iran

Gardangah-e Quchemi Persian: گردنگاه قوچمي
- Village
- Location within Iran
- Coordinates: 33°56′45″N 46°44′48″E
- Country: Iran
- Province: Kermanshah
- County: Eslamabad-e Gharb
- District: Homeyl
- Rural District: Homeyl

Population (2016)
  - Total: 686
- Time zone: UTC+3:30 (IRST)

Gardangah-e Quchemi (Persian: گردنگاه قوچمي) (Note: Also romanized as Gardangāh-e Qūchemī; also known as Gardāngāh) is a village in Homeyl Rural District of Homeyl District, Eslamabad-e Gharb County, Kermanshah province, Iran.

== Demographics ==
=== Population ===
At the time of the 2006 National Census, the village's population was 838 in 187 households. The following census in 2011 counted 782 people in 208 households. The 2016 census measured the population of the village as 686 people in 182 households. It was the most populous village in its rural district.
