= Sarab-e Shahini =

Sarab-e Shahini سراب شاهيني
- Village
- Location within Iran
- Coordinates: 34°04′02″N 46°48′18″E
- Country: Iran
- Province: Kermanshah
- County: Eslamabad-e Gharb
- Bakhsh: Central
- Rural District: Hasanabad

Population (2006)
  - Total: 182
- Time zone: UTC+3:30 (IRST)
  - Summer (DST): UTC+4:30 (IRDT)

Sarab-e Shahini (Persian: سراب شاهيني, also Romanized as Sarāb-e Shāhīnī) is a village in Hasanabad Rural District, in the Central District of Eslamabad-e Gharb County, Kermanshah Province, Iran. At the 2006 census, its population was 182, in 43 families.
