= Homeyl =

City in Kermanshah province, Iran

Homeyl Persian: حميل
- City
- Location within Iran
- Coordinates: 33°56′18″N 46°46′22″E
- Country: Iran
- Province: Kermanshah
- County: Shahabad-e Gharb
- District: Homeyl

Population (2016)
  - Total: 1,317
- Time zone: UTC+3:30 (IRST)

Homeyl (Persian: حميل; pronounced [hoˈmejl]) (Note: Also romanized as Homeil and Ḩomeyl; also known as Humeyl) is a city in, and the capital of, Homeyl District of Eslamabad-e Gharb County, Kermanshah province, Iran. It also serves as the administrative center for Homeyl Rural District.

== Demographics ==
=== Population ===
At the time of the 2006 National Census, the city's population was 1,303 in 306 households. The following census in 2011 counted 1,363 people in 366 households. The 2016 census measured the population of the city as 1,317 people in 377 households.
