= Argavary =

Argavary ارگوارئ
- Village
- Location within Iran
- Coordinates: 34°08′01″N 46°28′42″E
- Country: Iran
- Province: Kermanshah
- County: Eslamabad-e Gharb
- Bakhsh: Central
- Rural District: Howmeh-ye Shomali

Population (2006)
  - Total: 499
- Time zone: UTC+3:30 (IRST)
  - Summer (DST): UTC+4:30 (IRDT)

Argavary (Persian: ارگوارئ, also Romanized as Ārgavāry; also known as Sarāb Khomān Arkvāzy (Persian: سراب خمان اركوازئ) and Sarāb Khomān) is a village in Howmeh-ye Shomali Rural District, in the Central District of Eslamabad-e Gharb County, Kermanshah Province, Iran. At the 2006 census, its population was 499, in 102 families.
