= Sarab-e Shian =

Sarab-e Shian سراب شيان
- Village
- Location within Iran
- Coordinates: 34°05′57″N 46°42′44″E
- Country: Iran
- Province: Kermanshah
- County: Eslamabad-e Gharb
- Bakhsh: Central
- Rural District: Shiyan

Population (2006)
  - Total: 496
- Time zone: UTC+3:30 (IRST)
  - Summer (DST): UTC+4:30 (IRDT)

Sarab-e Shian (Persian: سراب شيان, also Romanized as Sarāb-e Shīān) is a village in Shiyan Rural District, in the Central District of Eslamabad-e Gharb County, Kermanshah Province, Iran. At the 2006 census, its population was 496, in 104 families.
