= Rutvand-e Ardeshir =

Rutvand-e Ardeshir (Persian: روتونداردشير) may refer to:

- Cheshmeh Kabud, Gilan-e Gharb
- Cheshmeh-ye Sangi-ye Rutvand
