= Sarab-e Surenabad =

Sarab-e Surenabad سرابسورن اباد
- Village
- Location within Iran
- Coordinates: 34°56′00″N 47°29′23″E
- Country: Iran
- Province: Kermanshah
- County: Sonqor
- Bakhsh: Central
- Rural District: Gavrud

Population (2006)
  - Total: 82
- Time zone: UTC+3:30 (IRST)
  - Summer (DST): UTC+4:30 (IRDT)

Sarab-e Surenabad (Persian: سرابسورن اباد, also Romanized as Sarāb-e Sūrenābād and Sarāb-e Surenābād) is a village in Gavrud Rural District, in the Central District of Sonqor County, Kermanshah Province, Iran. At the 2006 census, its population was 82, in 19 families.
