= Sarab-e Siah =

Sarab-e Siah سراب سياه
- Village
- Location within Iran
- Coordinates: 30°21′24″N 51°20′40″E
- Country: Iran
- Province: Fars
- County: Rostam
- Bakhsh: Central
- Rural District: Rostam-e Do

Population (2006)
  - Total: 209
- Time zone: UTC+3:30 (IRST)
  - Summer (DST): UTC+4:30 (IRDT)

Sarab-e Siah (Persian: سراب سياه, also Romanized as Sarāb-e Sīāh; also known as Sarāb-e Shāh Neshīn and Sarāb-e Shān Neshīn) is a village in Rostam-e Do Rural District, in the Central District of Rostam County, Fars province, Iran. At the 2006 census, its population was 209, in 37 families.
