= Sarab-e Hajji Pamoq =

Sarab-e Hajji Pamoq سراب حاجي پمق
- Village
- Location within Iran
- Coordinates: 35°19′44″N 47°19′04″E
- Country: Iran
- Province: Kurdistan
- County: Dehgolan
- Bakhsh: Central
- Rural District: Quri Chay

Population (2006)
  - Total: 526
- Time zone: UTC+3:30 (IRST)
  - Summer (DST): UTC+4:30 (IRDT)

Sarab-e Hajji Pamoq (Persian: سراب حاجي پمق, also Romanized as Sarāb-e Ḩājjī Pamoq; also known as Sarāb) is a village in Quri Chay Rural District, in the Central District of Dehgolan County, Kurdistan Province, Iran. In the 2006 census, its population was 526 with 112 families. The village is populated by Kurds.
