= Sarab-e Mugarm =

Sarab-e Mugarm سراب موگرم
- Village
- Location within Iran
- Coordinates: 30°48′17″N 50°43′42″E
- Country: Iran
- Province: Kohgiluyeh and Boyer-Ahmad
- County: Charam
- Bakhsh: Central
- Rural District: Alqchin

Population (2006)
  - Total: 136
- Time zone: UTC+3:30 (IRST)
  - Summer (DST): UTC+4:30 (IRDT)

Sarab-e Mugarm (Persian: سراب موگرم, also Romanized as Sarāb-e Mūgarm) is a village in Alqchin Rural District, in the Central District of Charam County, Kohgiluyeh and Boyer-Ahmad Province, Iran. At the 2006 census, its population was 136, in 24 families.
