= Sarbia =

Sarbia may refer to:

- Sarbia (skipper), a genus of butterfly

== Places ==
- Sarbia, Czarnków-Trzcianka County in Greater Poland Voivodeship (west-central Poland)
- Sarbia, Szamotuły County in Greater Poland Voivodeship (west-central Poland)
- Sarbia, Wągrowiec County in Greater Poland Voivodeship (west-central Poland)
- Sarbia, Lubusz Voivodeship (west Poland)
- Sarbia, West Pomeranian Voivodeship (north-west Poland)
