= Gardangah-e Shahali =

Gardangah-e Shahali گردنگاه شاعلي
- Village
- Location within Iran
- Coordinates: 33°10′48″N 47°50′25″E
- Country: Iran
- Province: Lorestan
- County: Pol-e Dokhtar
- Bakhsh: Central
- Rural District: Miyankuh-e Gharbi

Population (2006)
  - Total: 50
- Time zone: UTC+3:30 (IRST)
  - Summer (DST): UTC+4:30 (IRDT)

Gardangah-e Shahali (Persian: گردنگاه شاعلي, also Romanized as Gardangāh-e Shāh‘alī; also known as Shāh ‘Alī) is a village in Miyankuh-e Gharbi Rural District, in the Central District of Pol-e Dokhtar County, Lorestan Province, Iran. At the 2006 census, its population was 50, in 9 families.
