= Sarab-e Sarin =

Sarab-e Sarin سراب سرين
- Village
- Location within Iran
- Coordinates: 33°54′26″N 47°18′48″E
- Country: Iran
- Province: Kermanshah
- County: Kermanshah
- Bakhsh: Firuzabad
- Rural District: Osmanvand

Population (2006)
  - Total: 199
- Time zone: UTC+3:30 (IRST)
  - Summer (DST): UTC+4:30 (IRDT)

Sarab-e Sarin (Persian: سراب سرين, also Romanized as Sarāb-e Sarīn; also known as Sarīn and Sīrīn) is a village in Osmanvand Rural District, Firuzabad District, Kermanshah County, Kermanshah Province, Iran. At the 2006 census, its population was 199, in 45 families.
