= Sarab, Kangavar =

Sarab سراب
- Village
- Location within Iran
- Coordinates: 34°35′55″N 47°55′07″E
- Country: Iran
- Province: Kermanshah
- County: Kangavar
- Bakhsh: Central
- Rural District: Fash

Population (2006)
  - Total: 28
- Time zone: UTC+3:30 (IRST)
  - Summer (DST): UTC+4:30 (IRDT)

Sarab (Persian: سراب, also Romanized as Sarāb; also known as Sarāb-e Fash) is a village in Fash Rural District, in the Central District of Kangavar County, Kermanshah Province, Iran. At the 2006 census, its population was 28, in 9 families.
