= Sarabian =

Sarabian سرابيان
- Village
- Location within Iran
- Coordinates: 34°43′23″N 46°30′52″E
- Country: Iran
- Province: Kermanshah
- County: Ravansar
- Bakhsh: Central
- Rural District: Dowlatabad

Population (2006)
  - Total: 114
- Time zone: UTC+3:30 (IRST)
  - Summer (DST): UTC+4:30 (IRDT)

Sarabian (Persian: سرابيان, also Romanized as Sarābīān; also known as Sarākīān and Sarākīān) is a village in Dowlatabad Rural District, in the Central District of Ravansar County, Kermanshah Province, Iran. At the 2006 census, its population was 114, in 21 families.
