= Barikeh-ye Farkhinevand =

Barikeh-ye Farkhinevand باريكه فرخينوند
- village
- Location within Iran
- Coordinates: 33°36′55″N 47°00′50″E
- Country: Iran
- Province: Ilam
- County: Chardavol
- Bakhsh: Zagros
- Rural District: Ghaleh

Government
  - شورای اسلامی روستای باریکه در سال 1400 آقای رضا کوشکی: شورای دوم آقای محسن کوسکی

Population (2021)
  - Total: 118
- Time zone: UTC+3:30 (IRST)
  - Summer (DST): UTC+4:30 (IRDT)

Barikeh-ye Farkhinevand (Persian: باريكه فرخينوند, also Romanized as Bārīkeh-ye Farkhīnehvand; also known as Bārīkeh and Bārīkeh-ye Soflá) is a village in Ghaleh Rural District, Zagros District, Chardavol County, Ilam Province, Iran. At the 2006 census, its population was 149, in 26 families. The village is populated by Kurds.
