= Monavari, South Khorasan =

Monavari منوري
- Village
- Location within Iran
- Coordinates: 33°31′24″N 59°35′53″E
- Country: Iran
- Province: South Khorasan
- County: Zirkuh
- Bakhsh: Zohan
- Rural District: Afin

Population (2006)
  - Total: 61
- Time zone: UTC+3:30 (IRST)
  - Summer (DST): UTC+4:30 (IRDT)

Monavari (Persian: منوري, also Romanized as Monavarī and Munāvari) is a village in Afin Rural District, Zohan District, Zirkuh County, South Khorasan Province, Iran. At the 2006 census, its population was 61, in 15 families.
