= Rutavand, Ravansar =

Rutavand روتوند
- Village
- Location within Iran
- Coordinates: 34°37′02″N 46°34′31″E
- Country: Iran
- Province: Kermanshah
- County: Ravansar
- Bakhsh: Central
- Rural District: Zalu Ab

Population (2006)
  - Total: 84
- Time zone: UTC+3:30 (IRST)
  - Summer (DST): UTC+4:30 (IRDT)

Rutavand (Persian: روتوند, also Romanized as Rūtavand and Rūtevand; also known as Rūtavān, Rūtehvand, and Rūtevān) is a village in Zalu Ab Rural District, in the Central District of Ravansar County, Kermanshah Province, Iran. At the 2006 census, its population was 84, in 19 families.
