= Sarab-e Qarah Khan =

Sarab-e Qarah Khan سراب قره خان
- Village
- Location within Iran
- Coordinates: 36°06′22″N 47°20′42″E
- Country: Iran
- Province: Kurdistan
- County: Divandarreh
- Bakhsh: Central
- Rural District: Qaratureh

Population (2006)
  - Total: 160
- Time zone: UTC+3:30 (IRST)
  - Summer (DST): UTC+4:30 (IRDT)

Sarab-e Qarah Khan (Persian: سراب قره خان, also Romanized as Sarāb-e Qarah Khān and Sarāb-e Qareh Khān) is a village in Qaratureh Rural District, in the Central District of Divandarreh County, Kurdistan Province, Iran. At the 2006 census, its population was 160, in 33 families. The village is populated by Kurds.
