= Sarab-e-Sureh =

Sarab-e-Sureh سراب سوره
- Village
- Location within Iran
- Coordinates: 35°32′35″N 47°17′57″E
- Country: Iran
- Province: Kurdistan
- County: Dehgolan
- Bakhsh: Central
- Rural District: Yeylan-e Shomali

Population (2006)
  - Total: 266
- Time zone: UTC+3:30 (IRST)
  - Summer (DST): UTC+4:30 (IRDT)

Sarab-e-Sureh (Persian: سراب سوره, also Romanized as Sarāb-e-Sūreh and Sarāb Sūreh; also known as Sarāb-e Sorkh, Sarāb-e Sorkheh, Sarāb Sorkheh, and Sarab Sūra) is a village in Yeylan-e Shomali Rural District, in the Central District of Dehgolan County, Kurdistan Province, Iran. At the 2006 census, its population was 266, in 59 families. The village is populated by Kurds.
