= Sarab-e Zehab =

Sarab-e Zehab سراب ذهاب
- Village
- Location within Iran
- Coordinates: 34°37′20″N 45°49′38″E
- Country: Iran
- Province: Kermanshah
- County: Sarpol-e Zahab
- Bakhsh: Central
- Rural District: Dasht-e Zahab

Population (2006)
  - Total: 312
- Time zone: UTC+3:30 (IRST)
  - Summer (DST): UTC+4:30 (IRDT)

Sarab-e Zehab (Persian: سراب ذهاب, also Romanized as Sarāb-e Z̄ehāb) is a village in Dasht-e Zahab Rural District, in the Central District of Sarpol-e Zahab County, Kermanshah Province, Iran. At the 2006 census, its population was 312, in 56 families.
