= Cheshmeh-ye Sangi-ye Rutvand =

Cheshmeh-ye Sangi-ye Rutvand چشمه سنگي روتوند
- Village
- Location within Iran
- Coordinates: 33°59′52″N 46°14′00″E
- Country: Iran
- Province: Kermanshah
- County: Gilan-e Gharb
- Bakhsh: Central
- Rural District: Cheleh

Population (2006)
  - Total: 114
- Time zone: UTC+3:30 (IRST)
  - Summer (DST): UTC+4:30 (IRDT)

Cheshmeh-ye Sangi-ye Rutvand (Persian: چشمه سنگي روتوند, also Romanized as Cheshmeh-ye Sangī-ye Rūtvand; also known as Cheshmeh Sangīn and Rūtvand-e Ardeshīr) is a village in Cheleh Rural District, in the Central District of Gilan-e Gharb County, Kermanshah Province, Iran. At the 2006 census, its population was 114, in 25 families.
