= Bandarabad, Kermanshah =

Bandarabad بندراباد
- Village
- Location within Iran
- Coordinates: 34°18′25″N 46°45′06″E
- Country: Iran
- Province: Kermanshah
- County: Kermanshah
- Bakhsh: Mahidasht
- Rural District: Chaqa Narges

Population (2006)
  - Total: 39
- Time zone: UTC+3:30 (IRST)
  - Summer (DST): UTC+4:30 (IRDT)

Bandarabad (Persian: بندراباد, also Romanized as Bandarābād) is a village in Chaqa Narges Rural District, Mahidasht District, Kermanshah County, Kermanshah Province, Iran. At the 2006 census, its population was 39, in 7 families.
