= Cheshmeh Sangi, Sonqor =

Cheshmeh Sangi چشمه سنگي
- Village
- Location within Iran
- Coordinates: 34°43′00″N 47°46′00″E
- Country: Iran
- Province: Kermanshah
- County: Sonqor
- Bakhsh: Central
- Rural District: Parsinah

Population (2006)
  - Total: 143
- Time zone: UTC+3:30 (IRST)
  - Summer (DST): UTC+4:30 (IRDT)

Cheshmeh Sangi (Persian: چشمه سنگي, also Romanized as Cheshmeh Sangī) is a village in Parsinah Rural District, in the Central District of Sonqor County, Kermanshah Province, Iran. At the 2006 census, its population was 143, in 32 families.
