= Sarabas =

Sarabas سرابس
- Village
- Location within Iran
- Coordinates: 34°45′43″N 46°20′29″E
- Country: Iran
- Province: Kermanshah
- County: Javanrud
- Bakhsh: Central
- Rural District: Bazan

Population (2006)
  - Total: 545
- Time zone: UTC+3:30 (IRST)
  - Summer (DST): UTC+4:30 (IRDT)

Sarabas (Persian: سرابس, also Romanized as Sarābas; also known as Sarāb Bas and Sarāb Bas-e Seyyed ‘Alī) is a village in Bazan Rural District, in the Central District of Javanrud County, Kermanshah Province, Iran. At the 2006 census, its population was 545, in 117 families.
