= Sar Ab-e Gojestan =

Sar Ab-e Gojestan سراب گجستان
- Village
- Location within Iran
- Coordinates: 30°25′56″N 51°34′32″E
- Country: Iran
- Province: Fars
- County: Mamasani
- Bakhsh: Central
- Rural District: Jowzar

Population (2006)
  - Total: 37
- Time zone: UTC+3:30 (IRST)
  - Summer (DST): UTC+4:30 (IRDT)

Sar Ab-e Gojestan (Persian: سراب گجستان, also Romanized as Sar Āb-e Gojestān) is a village in Jowzar Rural District, in the Central District of Mamasani County, Fars province, Iran. At the 2006 census, its population was 37, in 10 families.
