= Sarab-e Baba Ali =

Sarab-e Baba Ali سراب باباعلي
- Village
- Location within Iran
- Coordinates: 34°20′28″N 47°53′42″E
- Country: Iran
- Province: Kermanshah
- County: Kangavar
- Bakhsh: Central
- Rural District: Khezel-e Gharbi

Population (2006)
  - Total: 85
- Time zone: UTC+3:30 (IRST)
  - Summer (DST): UTC+4:30 (IRDT)

Sarab-e Baba Ali (Persian: سراب باباعلي, also Romanized as Sarāb-e Bābā ‘Alī and Sarāb Bāba ‘Ali; also known as Sarāt-e Bābā ‘Alī) is a village in Khezel-e Gharbi Rural District, in the Central District of Kangavar County, Kermanshah Province, Iran. At the 2006 census, its population was 85, in 15 families.
