= Sarab Rud, Fars =

Sarab Rud سراب رود
- Village
- Location within Iran
- Coordinates: 29°57′06″N 51°39′50″E
- Country: Iran
- Province: Fars
- County: Mamasani
- Bakhsh: Central
- Rural District: Bakesh-e Yek

Population (2006)
  - Total: 24
- Time zone: UTC+3:30 (IRST)
  - Summer (DST): UTC+4:30 (IRDT)

Sarab Rud (Persian: سراب رود, also Romanized as Sarāb Rūd) is a village in Bakesh-e Yek Rural District, in the Central District of Mamasani County, Fars province, Iran. At the 2006 census, its population was 24, in 6 families.
