= Saffron (disambiguation) =

Saffron is a spice.

Saffron may also refer to:

- Saffron (trade), the business of producing and selling saffron
- Saffron (color), a shade of orange-yellow
- Saffron (album), a 2010 album by Ron Contour and Factor Chandelier
- Saffron (singer) (born 1968), lead singer of Republica
- Saffron Brand Consultants, a design firm and consultant
- Saffron Type System, a font-rendering technology used in Adobe Flash
- Saffron (Ranma ½), a character in Ranma ½
- Saffron Monsoon, a character in Absolutely Fabulous
- Saffron, a minor character in the Firefly universe
- Saffron, a character in the video game Super Paper Mario
- Saffron, a character in the novel Saffy's Angel
- "Saffron", a song by the Smashing Pumpkins from Atum: A Rock Opera in Three Acts, 2023
- Saffron Bee, a member of the Chaotix in the Archie Sonic the Hedgehog comics
- Saffron City, one of the largest settlements of the Kanto region in Pokémon games

== People with the given name ==
- Saffron Aldridge (born 1968), English fashion model, freelance journalist and social activist
- Saffron Barker (born 2000), English internet personality
- Saffron Burrows (born 1972), British actress
- Saffron Coomber (born 1994), English actress
- Saffron Herndon (born 1967), American comedian
- Saffron Jordan (born 1993), English footballer
- Saffron Lempriere (born 1992), English television personality
- Saffron "Saffie" Osborne (born 2002), British jockey
- Saffronn Te Ratana (born 1975), New Zealand visual artist

== See also ==
- Ministry of States and Frontier Regions (Pakistan) (SAFRON), a federal ministry in Pakistan
- Nishan Sahib
- Saffron Revolution, the 2007 Burmese anti-government protests
- The Saffron Swastika, a 2001 book by Koenraad Elst
- Saffron terror, militant Hindu nationalism
- Saffron Walden, a town in Essex, England, named after the spice
- Saffronisation, a symbol of Hindu nationalism in Indian politics
- Safran
- Sannyasa or renunciation of the worldly in Hinduism
- Theravada Buddhism
- Zunfthaus zur Saffran
