= Sarab-e Naniz =

Sarab-e Naniz سراب ننيز
- Village
- Location within Iran
- Coordinates: 30°17′17″N 50°53′25″E
- Country: Iran
- Province: Kohgiluyeh and Boyer-Ahmad
- County: Gachsaran
- Bakhsh: Central
- Rural District: Emamzadeh Jafar

Population (2006)
  - Total: 902
- Time zone: UTC+3:30 (IRST)
  - Summer (DST): UTC+4:30 (IRDT)

Sarab-e Naniz (Persian: سراب ننيز, also Romanized as Sarāb-e Nanīz, Sarāb-e Nānīz, Sarāb-i-Nanīz, and Sar Āb Nanīz; also known as Sarāb-e Nīz) is a village in Emamzadeh Jafar Rural District, in the Central District of Gachsaran County, Kohgiluyeh and Boyer-Ahmad Province, Iran. At the 2006 census, its population was 902, in 203 families.
