= Sarab, Gilan-e Gharb =

Sarab سراب
- Village
- Location within Iran
- Coordinates: 34°07′55″N 45°56′16″E
- Country: Iran
- Province: Kermanshah
- County: Gilan-e Gharb
- Bakhsh: Central
- Rural District: Cheleh

Population (2006)
  - Total: 1,224
- Time zone: UTC+3:30 (IRST)
  - Summer (DST): UTC+4:30 (IRDT)

Sarab (Persian: سراب, also Romanized as Sarāb; also known as Sarāb-e Gīlān) is a village in Cheleh Rural District, in the Central District of Gilan-e Gharb County, Kermanshah Province, Iran. At the 2006 census, its population was 1,224, in 285 families.
