= Sarab-e Karzan =

Sarab-e Karzan سراب كارزان
- Village
- Location within Iran
- Coordinates: 33°44′37″N 46°29′10″E
- Country: Iran
- Province: Ilam
- County: Sirvan
- Bakhsh: Karezan
- Rural District: Karezan

Population (2006)
  - Total: 746
- Time zone: UTC+3:30 (IRST)
  - Summer (DST): UTC+4:30 (IRDT)

Sarab-e Karzan (Persian: سراب كارزان, also Romanized as Sarāb-e Kārzān and Sarāb-e Kārāzān) is a village in Karezan Rural District, Karezan District, Sirvan County, Ilam Province, Iran. At the 2006 census, its population was 746, in 151 families. The village is populated by khezel trible of Kurds.
