= Sarab-e Sheleh =

Sarab-e Sheleh سراب شله
- Village
- Location within Iran
- Coordinates: 34°35′00″N 46°51′00″E
- Country: Iran
- Province: Kermanshah
- County: Kermanshah
- Bakhsh: Central
- Rural District: Miyan Darband

Population (2006)
  - Total: 202
- Time zone: UTC+3:30 (IRST)
  - Summer (DST): UTC+4:30 (IRDT)

Sarab-e Sheleh (Persian: سراب شله, also Romanized as Sarāb-e Sheleh) is a village in Miyan Darband Rural District, in the Central District of Kermanshah County, Kermanshah Province, Iran. At the 2006 census, its population was 202, in 45 families.
