= Sarab-e Shah Hoseyn =

Sarab-e Shah Hoseyn سراب شاه حسين
- Village
- Location within Iran
- Coordinates: 34°38′13″N 47°04′42″E
- Country: Iran
- Province: Kermanshah
- County: Kermanshah
- Bakhsh: Central
- Rural District: Poshtdarband

Population (2006)
  - Total: 141
- Time zone: UTC+3:30 (IRST)
  - Summer (DST): UTC+4:30 (IRDT)

Sarab-e Shah Hoseyn (Persian: سراب شاه حسين, also Romanized as Sarāb-e Shāh Ḩoseyn; also known as Sarāb-e Shāh Ḩoseynī) is a village in Poshtdarband Rural District, in the Central District of Kermanshah County, Kermanshah Province, Iran. At the 2006 census, its population was 141, in 31 families.
