= Sarab-e Kalan =

Sarab-e Kalan سراب كلان
- Village
- Location within Iran
- Coordinates: 33°34′25″N 46°43′07″E
- Country: Iran
- Province: Ilam
- County: Sirvan
- Bakhsh: Karezan
- Rural District: Zangvan

Population (2006)
  - Total: 884
- Time zone: UTC+3:30 (IRST)
  - Summer (DST): UTC+4:30 (IRDT)

Sarab-e Kalan (Persian: سراب كلان, also Romanized as Sarāb-e Kalān) is a village in Zangvan Rural District, Karezan District, Sirvan County, Ilam Province, Iran. At the 2006 census, its population was 884, in 184 families. The village is populated by Kurds.
