= Sarab-e Qaht =

Sarab-e Qaht سراب قحط
- Village
- Location within Iran
- Coordinates: 35°12′08″N 47°33′49″E
- Country: Iran
- Province: Kurdistan
- County: Qorveh
- Bakhsh: Central
- Rural District: Panjeh Ali

Population (2006)
  - Total: 73
- Time zone: UTC+3:30 (IRST)
  - Summer (DST): UTC+4:30 (IRDT)

Sarab-e Qaht (Persian: سراب قحط, also Romanized as Sarāb-e Qaḩţ; also known as Sar-e Owqāt and Sar-i-Aūqāt) is a village in Panjeh Ali Rural District, in the Central District of Qorveh County, Kurdistan Province, Iran. At the 2006 census, its population was 73, in 18 families. The village is populated by Kurds.
