= Sarab-e Tajar =

Sarab-e Tajar سراب طجر
- Village
- Location within Iran
- Coordinates: 34°13′56″N 48°36′23″E
- Country: Iran
- Province: Hamadan
- County: Malayer
- Bakhsh: Samen
- Rural District: Samen

Population (2006)
  - Total: 61
- Time zone: UTC+3:30 (IRST)
  - Summer (DST): UTC+4:30 (IRDT)

Sarab-e Tajar (Persian: سراب طجر, also Romanized as Sarāb-e Ţajar) is a village in Samen Rural District, Samen District, Malayer County, Hamadan Province, Iran. At the 2006 census, its population was 61, in 21 families.
