= Iraneh =

Iraneh ايرانه
- Village
- Location within Iran
- Coordinates: 34°14′35″N 48°35′51″E
- Country: Iran
- Province: Hamadan
- County: Malayer
- Bakhsh: Samen
- Rural District: Haram Rud-e Sofla

Population (2006)
  - Total: 42
- Time zone: UTC+3:30 (IRST)
  - Summer (DST): UTC+4:30 (IRDT)

Iraneh (Persian: ايرانه, also Romanized as Īrāneh; also known as Irāneh-ye Sāmen, Īrīneh, Orūneh, Sarāb, and Sarāb Sāmen) is a village in Haram Rud-e Sofla Rural District, Samen District, Malayer County, Hamadan Province, Iran. At the 2006 census, its population was 42, in 12 families.
