= Dizgaran, Kermanshah =

Dizgaran ديزگران
- Village
- Location within Iran
- Coordinates: 34°47′08″N 47°05′10″E
- Country: Iran
- Province: Kermanshah
- County: Kermanshah
- Bakhsh: Central
- Rural District: Poshtdarband

Population (2006)
  - Total: 171
- Time zone: UTC+3:30 (IRST)
  - Summer (DST): UTC+4:30 (IRDT)

Dizgaran (Persian: ديزگران, also Romanized as Dīzgarān and Dīzgerān; also known as Yazgarān) is a village in Poshtdarband Rural District, in the Central District of Kermanshah County, Kermanshah Province, Iran. At the 2006 census, its population was 171, in 43 families.
