= Sarab, Yemen =

Coordinates: 14°52′N 48°31′E

- Interactive map of Sarab, Yemen
- Country: Yemen
- Governorate: Hadhramaut
- Time zone: UTC+3 (Yemen Standard Time)

Sarab, Yemen is a village in eastern Yemen. It is located in the Hadhramaut Governorate.
