= Sarab Qanbar =

Sarab Qanbar سراب قنبر
- Village
- Location within Iran
- Coordinates: 34°02′34″N 46°17′35″E
- Country: Iran
- Province: Kermanshah
- County: Gilan-e Gharb
- Bakhsh: Govar
- Rural District: Gowavar

Population (2006)
  - Total: 111
- Time zone: UTC+3:30 (IRST)
  - Summer (DST): UTC+4:30 (IRDT)

Sarab Qanbar (Persian: سراب قنبر, also Romanized as Sarāb Qanbar; also known as Sarāb Qanbar-e Shahīd Hādīān and Shahīd Dāvūd Hādīān) is a village in Gowavar Rural District, Govar District, Gilan-e Gharb County, Kermanshah Province, Iran. At the 2006 census, its population was 111, in 20 families.
