= Sar Ab-e Barnaj =

Sar Ab-e Barnaj سراب برناج
- Village
- Location within Iran
- Coordinates: 34°28′19″N 47°22′42″E
- Country: Iran
- Province: Kermanshah
- County: Harsin
- Bakhsh: Bisotun
- Rural District: Cham Chamal

Population (2006)
  - Total: 80
- Time zone: UTC+3:30 (IRST)
  - Summer (DST): UTC+4:30 (IRDT)

Sar Ab-e Barnaj (Persian: سراب برناج, also Romanized as Sar Āb-e Barnāj and Sarāb-e Barnāj) is a village in Cham Chamal Rural District, Bisotun District, Harsin County, Kermanshah Province, Iran. At the 2006 census, its population was 80, in 18 families.
