= Sarab-e Sheykh Hasan =

Sarab-e Sheykh Hasan سراب شيخ حسن
- Village
- Location within Iran
- Coordinates: 35°04′08″N 47°29′19″E
- Country: Iran
- Province: Kurdistan
- County: Qorveh
- Bakhsh: Central
- Rural District: Panjeh Ali-ye Jonubi

Population (2006)
  - Total: 257
- Time zone: UTC+3:30 (IRST)
  - Summer (DST): UTC+4:30 (IRDT)

Sarab-e Sheykh Hasan (Persian: سراب شيخ حسن, also Romanized as Sarāb-e Sheykh Ḩasan; also known as Sarāb) is a village in Panjeh Ali-ye Jonubi Rural District, in the Central District of Qorveh County, Kurdistan Province, Iran. At the 2006 census, its population was 257, in 57 families. The village is populated by Kurds.
