= Bondorabad, Yazd =

Bandarabad بندراباد
- Village
- Location within Iran
- Coordinates: 32°01′54″N 54°06′53″E
- Country: Iran
- Province: Yazd
- County: Saduq
- Bakhsh: Central
- Rural District: Rostaq

Population (2006)
  - Total: 738
- Time zone: UTC+3:30 (IRST)
  - Summer (DST): UTC+4:30 (IRDT)

Bondorabad (Persian: بندراباد, also Romanized as Bondorābād, Bandarābād, and Bondarābād) is a village in Rostaq Rural District, in the Central District of Saduq County, Yazd Province, Iran. At the 2006 census, its population was 738, in 213 families.
