= Sarab-e Tiran =

Sarab-e Tiran سراب تيران
- Village
- Location within Iran
- Coordinates: 34°30′46″N 46°36′19″E
- Country: Iran
- Province: Kermanshah
- County: Kermanshah
- Bakhsh: Kuzaran
- Rural District: Sanjabi

Population (2006)
  - Total: 173
- Time zone: UTC+3:30 (IRST)
  - Summer (DST): UTC+4:30 (IRDT)

Sarab-e Tiran (Persian: سراب تيران, also Romanized as Sarāb-e Tīrān; also known as Sarāb-e Tīzān) is a village in Sanjabi Rural District, Kuzaran District, Kermanshah County, Kermanshah Province, Iran. At the 2006 census, its population was 173, in 37 families.
