= Gardangah =

Gardangah گردنگاه
- Village
- Location within Iran
- Coordinates: 31°03′26″N 50°41′40″E
- Country: Iran
- Province: Kohgiluyeh and Boyer-Ahmad
- County: Boyer-Ahmad
- Bakhsh: Ludab
- Rural District: Ludab

Population (2006)
  - Total: 137
- Time zone: UTC+3:30 (IRST)
  - Summer (DST): UTC+4:30 (IRDT)

Gardangah (Persian: گردنگاه, also Romanized as Gardangāh; also known as Gardanga, Gardenak, and Gerdang) is a village in Ludab Rural District, Ludab District, Boyer-Ahmad County, Kohgiluyeh and Boyer-Ahmad Province, Iran. At the 2006 census, its population was 137, in 32 families.
