= Zaafrane, Tunisia =

Zaafrane
- Location in Tunisia
- Coordinates: 33°26′17″N 8°55′5″E
- Country: Tunisia
- Governorate: Kebili Governorate
- Time zone: UTC1 (CET)

Zaafrane (Arabic: زعفران) is a small desert oasis village in central Tunisia. It is located at around 33°26′17″N 8°55′5″E and is the gateway to the Grand Erg Oriental desert. It is the centre for the traditionally nomadic Adhara people.
