= Siah Pelah-ye Ommid Olya =

Siah Pelah-ye Ommid Olya سياه پله اميد علي
- Village
- Location within Iran
- Coordinates: 33°38′00″N 47°02′00″E
- Country: Iran
- Province: Lorestan
- County: Kuhdasht
- Bakhsh: Darb-e Gonbad
- Rural District: Darb-e Gonbad

Population (2006)
  - Total: 34
- Time zone: UTC+3:30 (IRST)
  - Summer (DST): UTC+4:30 (IRDT)

Siah Pelah-ye Ommid Olya (Persian: سياه پله اميد علي, also Romanized as Sīāh Pelah-ye Ommīd ‘Olyā; also known as Seh Ney) is a village in Darb-e Gonbad Rural District, Darb-e Gonbad District, Kuhdasht County, Lorestan Province, Iran. At the 2006 census, its population was 34, in 7 families.
