= Sarab-e Kam =

Sarab-e Kam سرابكام
- Village
- Location within Iran
- Coordinates: 34°49′22″N 46°48′29″E
- Country: Iran
- Province: Kurdistan
- County: Kamyaran
- Bakhsh: Central
- Rural District: Shahu

Population (2006)
  - Total: 173
- Time zone: UTC+3:30 (IRST)
  - Summer (DST): UTC+4:30 (IRDT)

Sarab-e Kam (Persian: سرابكام, also Romanized as Sarāb-e Kām and Sarābekām) is a village in Shahu Rural District, in the Central District of Kamyaran County, Kurdistan Province, Iran. At the 2006 census, its population was 173, in 38 families. The village is populated by Kurds.
