= Sarab-e Khamzan-e Kuchek =

Sarab-e Khamzan-e Kuchek سراب خمزان كوچك
- Village
- Country: Iran
- Province: Kohgiluyeh and Boyer-Ahmad
- County: Boyer-Ahmad
- Bakhsh: Central
- Rural District: Dasht-e Rum

Population (2006)
  - Total: 27
- Time zone: UTC+3:30 (IRST)
  - Summer (DST): UTC+4:30 (IRDT)

Sarab-e Khamzan-e Kuchek (Persian: سراب خمزان كوچك, also Romanized as Sarāb-e Khamzān-e Kūchek) is a village in Dasht-e Rum Rural District, in the Central District of Boyer-Ahmad County, Kohgiluyeh and Boyer-Ahmad Province, Iran. At the 2006 census, its population was 27, in 5 families.
