= Sarab Gur-e Tuti =

Sarab Gur-e Tuti سرابگورطوطي
- Village
- Location within Iran
- Coordinates: 33°30′42″N 46°48′23″E
- Country: Iran
- Province: Ilam
- County: Sirvan
- Bakhsh: Central
- Rural District: Rudbar

Population (2006)
  - Total: 137
- Time zone: UTC+3:30 (IRST)
  - Summer (DST): UTC+4:30 (IRDT)

Sarab Gur-e Tuti (Persian: سرابگورطوطي, also Romanized as Sarāb Gūr-e Ţūţī; also known as Gūr Ţūţī and Kūr Ţūţī) is a village in Rudbar Rural District, Central District, Sirvan County, Ilam Province, Iran. At the 2006 census, its population was 137, in 24 families. The village is populated by Kurds.
