= Zəfəran =

- Location within Azerbaijan
- Coordinates: 40°34′07″N 50°03′55″E
- Country: Azerbaijan
- City: Baku
- Time zone: UTC+4 (AZT)
  - Summer (DST): UTC+5 (AZT)

Zəfəran (also, Zə’fəran and Shafran) is a village in Baku, Azerbaijan.
