= Sarab Khoshkeh-ye Olya =

Village in Kermanshah, Iran

Sarab Khoshkeh-ye Olya سراب خشكه عليا
- Village
- Location within Iran
- Coordinates: 34°23′40″N 47°00′59″E
- Country: Iran
- Province: Kermanshah
- County: Kermanshah
- Bakhsh: Central
- Rural District: Baladarband

Population (2006)
  - Total: 99
- Time zone: UTC+3:30 (IRST)
  - Summer (DST): UTC+4:30 (IRDT)

Sarab Khoshkeh-ye Olya (Persian: سراب خشكه عليا, also Romanized as Sarāb Khoshkeh-ye ‘Olyā; also known as Sarāb Khoshkeh-ye Bālā) is a village in Baladarband Rural District, in the Central District of Kermanshah County, Kermanshah Province, Iran. At the 2006 census, its population was 99, in 15 families.
