= Sarabadiyeh-ye Sofla =

Sarabadiyeh-ye Sofla سراباديه سفلي
- Village
- Location within Iran
- Coordinates: 34°22′08″N 47°37′25″E
- Country: Iran
- Province: Kermanshah
- County: Harsin
- Bakhsh: Central
- Rural District: Howmeh

Population (2006)
  - Total: 301
- Time zone: UTC+3:30 (IRST)
  - Summer (DST): UTC+4:30 (IRDT)

Sarabadiyeh-ye Sofla (Persian: سراباديه سفلي, also Romanized as Sarābādīyeh-ye Soflá; also known as Sarāb Bādīyeh-ye Soflá) is a village in Howmeh Rural District, in the Central District of Harsin County, Kermanshah Province, Iran. At the 2006 census, its population was 301, in 72 families.
