= Sarabadiyeh-ye Olya =

Sarabadiyeh-ye Olya سراباديه عليا
- Village
- Location within Iran
- Coordinates: 34°21′53″N 47°37′36″E
- Country: Iran
- Province: Kermanshah
- County: Harsin
- Bakhsh: Central
- Rural District: Howmeh

Population (2006)
  - Total: 112
- Time zone: UTC+3:30 (IRST)
  - Summer (DST): UTC+4:30 (IRDT)

Sarabadiyeh-ye Olya (Persian: سراباديه عليا, also Romanized as Sarābādīyeh-ye ‘Olyā; also known as Sar Ābādeyeh, Sarāb Bādīyeh, Sarāb Bādīyeh-ye ‘Olyā, Sarāb Buiyān, Sarāb-e Bādīeh, and Sarāb-e Bādīyeh) is a village in Howmeh Rural District, in the Central District of Harsin County, Kermanshah Province, Iran. At the 2006 census, its population was 112, in 23 families.
