= Sarab-e Garm Garab =

Sarab-e Garm Garab سراب گرم گراب
- Village
- Location within Iran
- Coordinates: 34°43′00″N 46°33′00″E
- Country: Iran
- Province: Kermanshah
- County: Ravansar
- Bakhsh: Central
- Rural District: Dowlatabad

Population (2006)
  - Total: 93
- Time zone: UTC+3:30 (IRST)
  - Summer (DST): UTC+4:30 (IRDT)

Sarab-e Garm Garab (Persian: سراب گرم گراب, also Romanized as Sarāb-e Garm Garāb; also known as Sarāb-e Garāb) is a village in Dowlatabad Rural District, in the Central District of Ravansar County, Kermanshah Province, Iran. At the 2006 census, its population was 93, in 22 families.
