= Sarab-e Bardeh Zanjir-e Olya =

Village in Kermanshah, Iran

Sarab-e Bardeh Zanjir-e Olya سراب برده زنجيرعليا
- Village
- Location within Iran
- Coordinates: 34°45′00″N 46°17′00″E
- Country: Iran
- Province: Kermanshah
- County: Javanrud
- Bakhsh: Central
- Rural District: Bazan

Population (2006)
  - Total: 385
- Time zone: UTC+3:30 (IRST)
  - Summer (DST): UTC+4:30 (IRDT)

Sarab-e Bardeh Zanjir-e Olya (Persian: سراب برده زنجيرعليا, also Romanized as Sarāb-e Bardeh Zanjīr-e ‘Olyā; also known as Sarāb-e Bard Zanjīr-e ‘Olyā) is a village in Bazan Rural District, in the Central District of Javanrud County, Kermanshah Province, Iran. At the 2006 census, its population was 385, in 72 families.
