= Ganj Dareh =

Iranian settlement, 8200-7600 BCE

- تپه گنج دره (Persian)
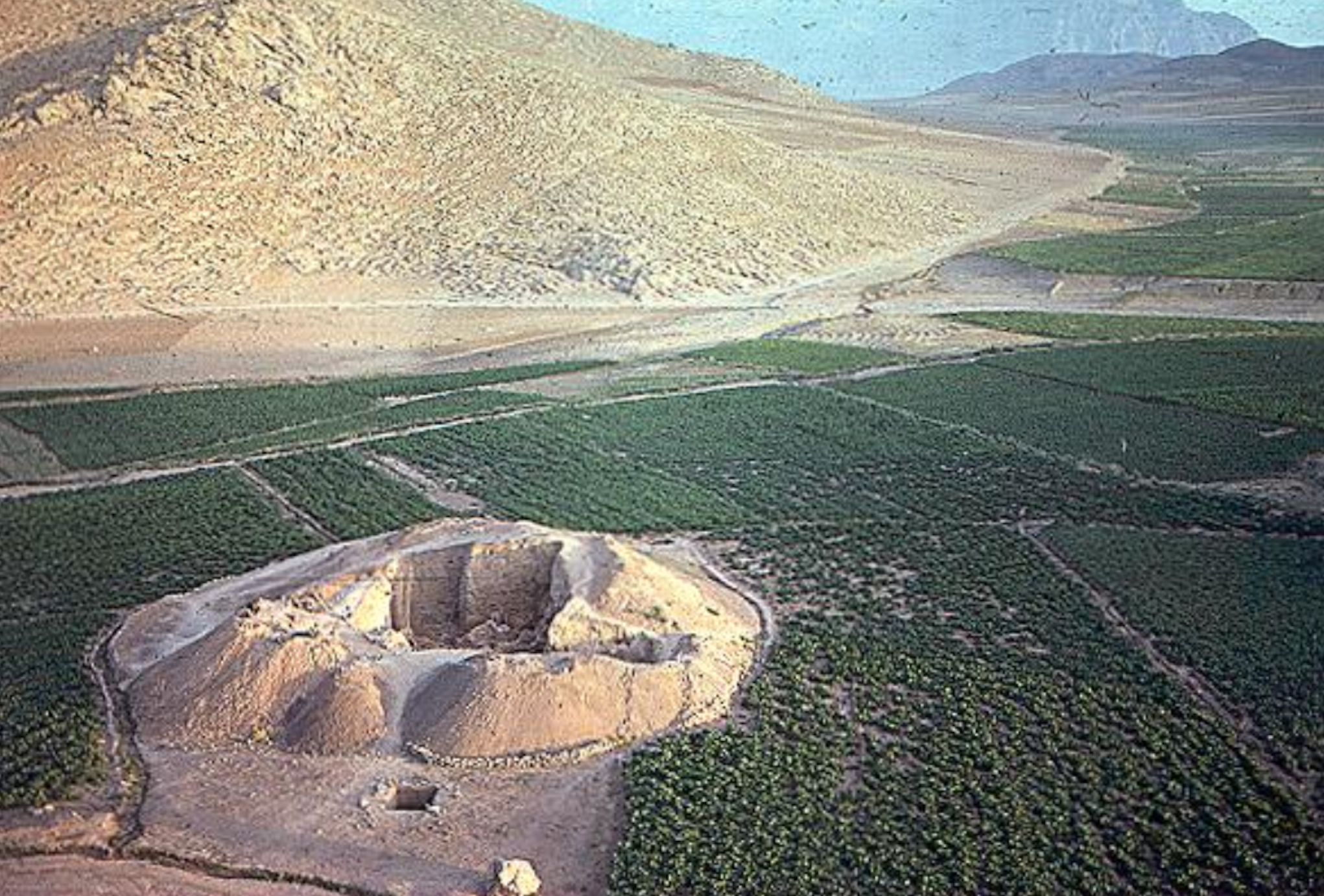
- Remains of the site in 2019

- Location in the Near East Ganj Dareh (Iran)
- 34.2721°N 47.4758°E
- Type: Settlement
- Periods: Neolithic
- Associated with: early villagers/ agro-pastoralists
- Location: Kermanshah, Iran
- Region: Gamas-Ab Valley

History
- Built: c. 8200 BC
- Abandoned: c. 7600 BC

Site notes
- Elevation: 1,400 m (4,600 ft)
- Excavation dates: 1965–1974, 2017–2018
- Discovered: 1965

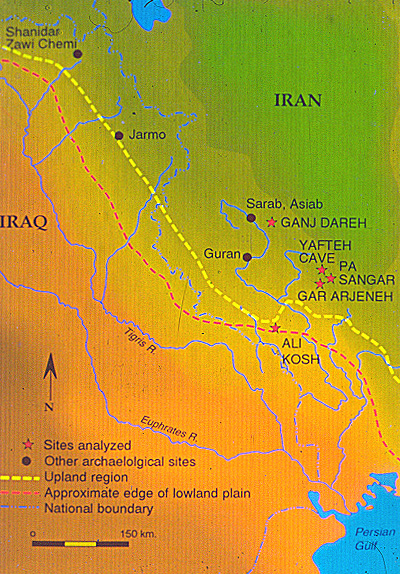
Map showing location of Ganj Dareh, Tepe Guran, Tepe Sarab, Ali Kosh, and Tepe Asiab, as well as some other locations of early herding activity

Area of the Fertile Crescent, around 7500 BC, with main sites. Ganj Dareh is one of the important sites of the Pre-Pottery Neolithic period. The area of Mesopotamia proper was not yet settled by humans.

Ganj Dareh (Persian: تپه گنج دره; "Treasure Valley" in Persian, or "Treasure Valley Hill" if tepe/tappeh (hill) is appended to the name) is a Neolithic settlement in western Iran. It is located in the Harsin County in east of Kermanshah Province, in the central Zagros Mountains.

== Research history ==
First discovered in 1965, it was excavated by Canadian archaeologist Philip Smith during the 1960s and 1970s, for four field seasons. In 2017 or 2018, the site was revisited by an Iranian-Danish team of archaeologists under direction of Hojjat Darabi and Tobias Richter. The oldest settlement remains on the site date back to c. 8200 BC, and have yielded the earliest evidence for goat domestication in the world. The only evidence for domesticated crops found at the site so far is the presence of two-row barley.

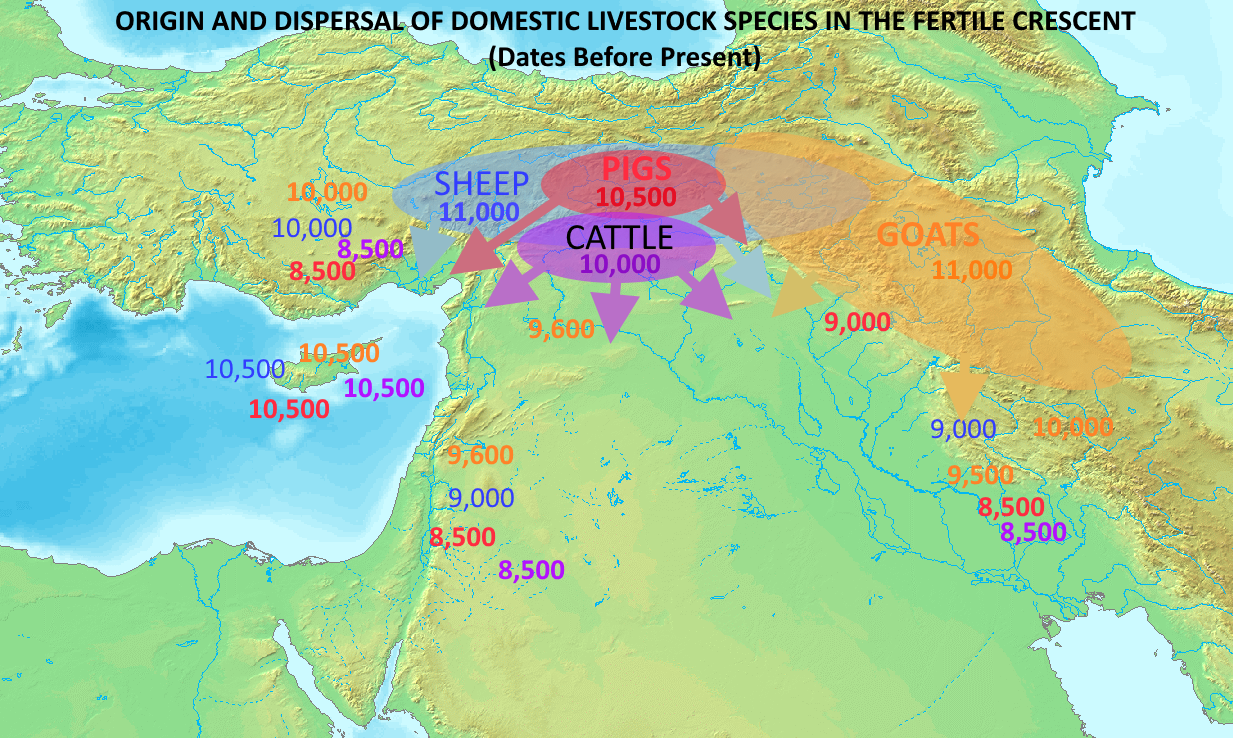
Origin and dispersal of domestic livestock species in the Fertile Crescent (dates Before Present). Goat domestication occurred in Ganj Dareh

The remains have been classified into five occupation levels, from A at the top, to E.

== Ceramics ==
Ganj Dareh is important in the study of Neolithic ceramics in Luristan and Kurdistan. This is a period beginning in the late 8th millennium, and continuing to the middle of the 6th millennium BC. Also, the evidence from two other excavated sites nearby is important, from Tepe Guran, and Tepe Sarab (shown on the map in this article). They are all located southwest of Harsin, on the Mahidasht plain, and in the Hulailan valley.

At Ganj Dareh, two early ceramic traditions are evident. One is based on the use of clay for figurines and small geometric pieces like cones and disks. These are dated ca. 7300-6900 BC.

The other ceramic tradition originated in the use of clay for mud-walled buildings (ca. 7300 BC). These traditions are also shared by Tepe Guran, and Tepe Sarab. Tepe Asiab is also located near Tepe Sarab, and may be the earliest of all these sites. Both sites appear to have been seasonally occupied. Another site from the same period is Chia Jani, also in Kermanshah. Chia Jani is located about 60 km southwest from Ganj Dareh.

Ali Kosh is also a related site of the Neolithic period.

== Archaeogenetics ==
Researchers sequenced the genome from the petrous bone of a c. 40 year old woman from Ganj Dareh, GD13a. mtDNA analysis shows that she belonged to Haplogroup X. She is phenotypically similar to the Anatolian early farmers and Caucasus Hunter-Gatherers. Her DNA revealed that she had black hair, brown eyes and was lactose intolerant. The derived SLC45A2 variant associated with light skin was not observed in GD13a, but the derived SLC24A5 variant which is also associated with the same trait was observed.

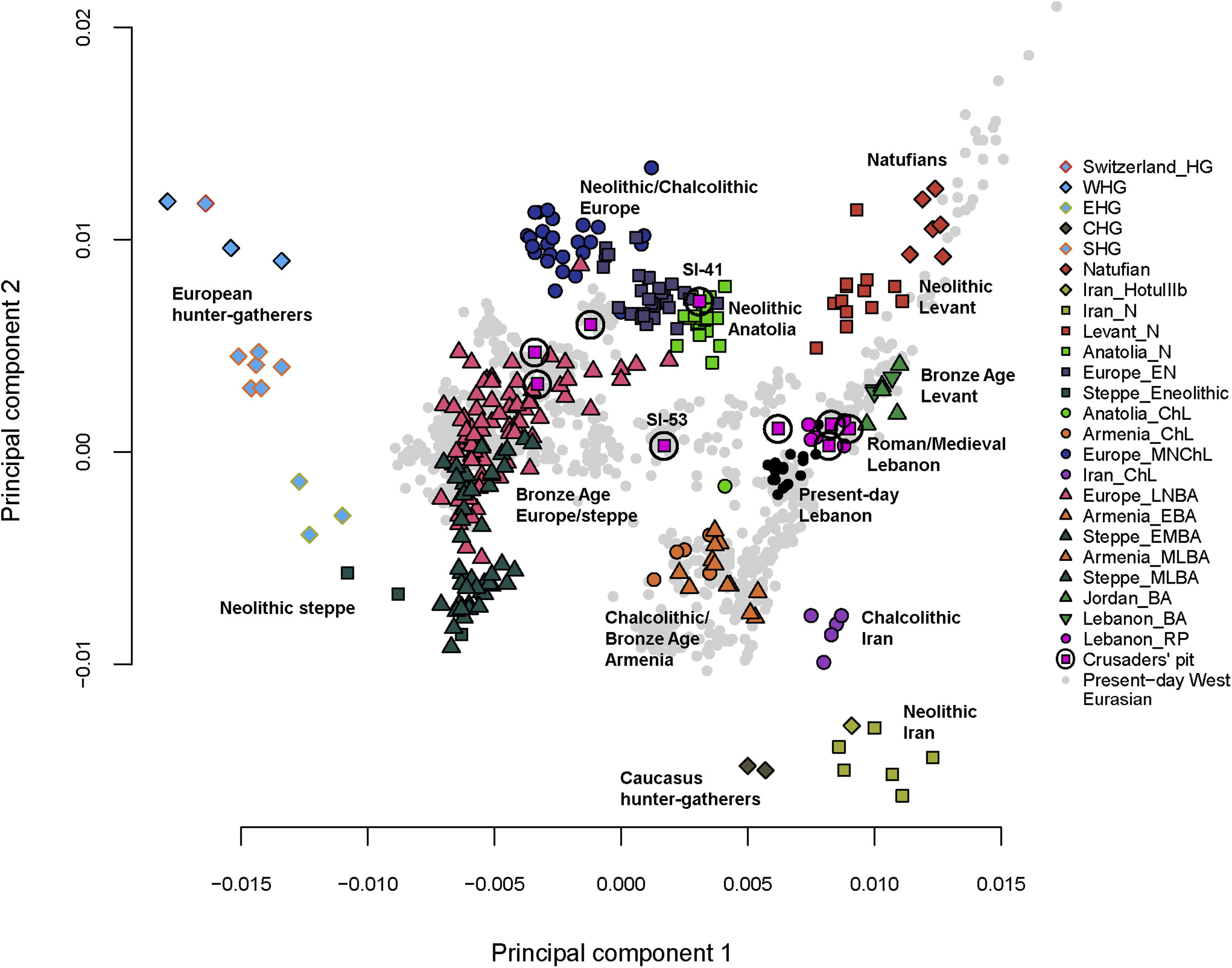
Principal Components Analysis of Ancient West Eurasians: Eigenvectors were inferred using present-day populations (gray points) and the ancient samples (colored shapes) were projected onto the plot. GD13a is part of the Neolithic Iranian (Iran_N) cluster.

GD13a is genetically closest to the ancient Caucasus hunter-gatherers identified from human remains from Georgia (Satsurblia Cave and Kotias Klde). She belonged to a population (Neolithic Iranians) that was genetically distinct from the Neolithic Anatolian farmers. In terms of modern populations, she shows the relative highest genetic affinity with the Baloch people, Makran Baloch, and Brahui people. Also genetically close to GD13a were ancient samples from Steppe populations (Yamanya & Afanasievo) that were part of one or more Bronze age migrations into Europe, as well as early Bronze age cultures in that continent (Corded Ware) in line with previous relationships observed for the Caucasus Hunter-Gatherers.

Most Neolithic Iranian specimens from Ganj Dareh were found to belong to the paternal haplogroup R2a. The to date oldest sample of haplogroup R2a was observed in the remains of a Neolithic human from Ganj Dareh in western Iran (c. 10,162 years old). A late Neolithic sample (I1671) was found to belong to Haplogroup G2a.

According to one model, the Mesolithic/Neolithic Iranian lineage are inferred to derive significant amounts of their ancestry from Basal Eurasian (c. 38–48%), with the remainder ancestry being closer to Ancient North Eurasians or Eastern European Hunter-Gatherer (ANE/EHG; c. 52–62%).

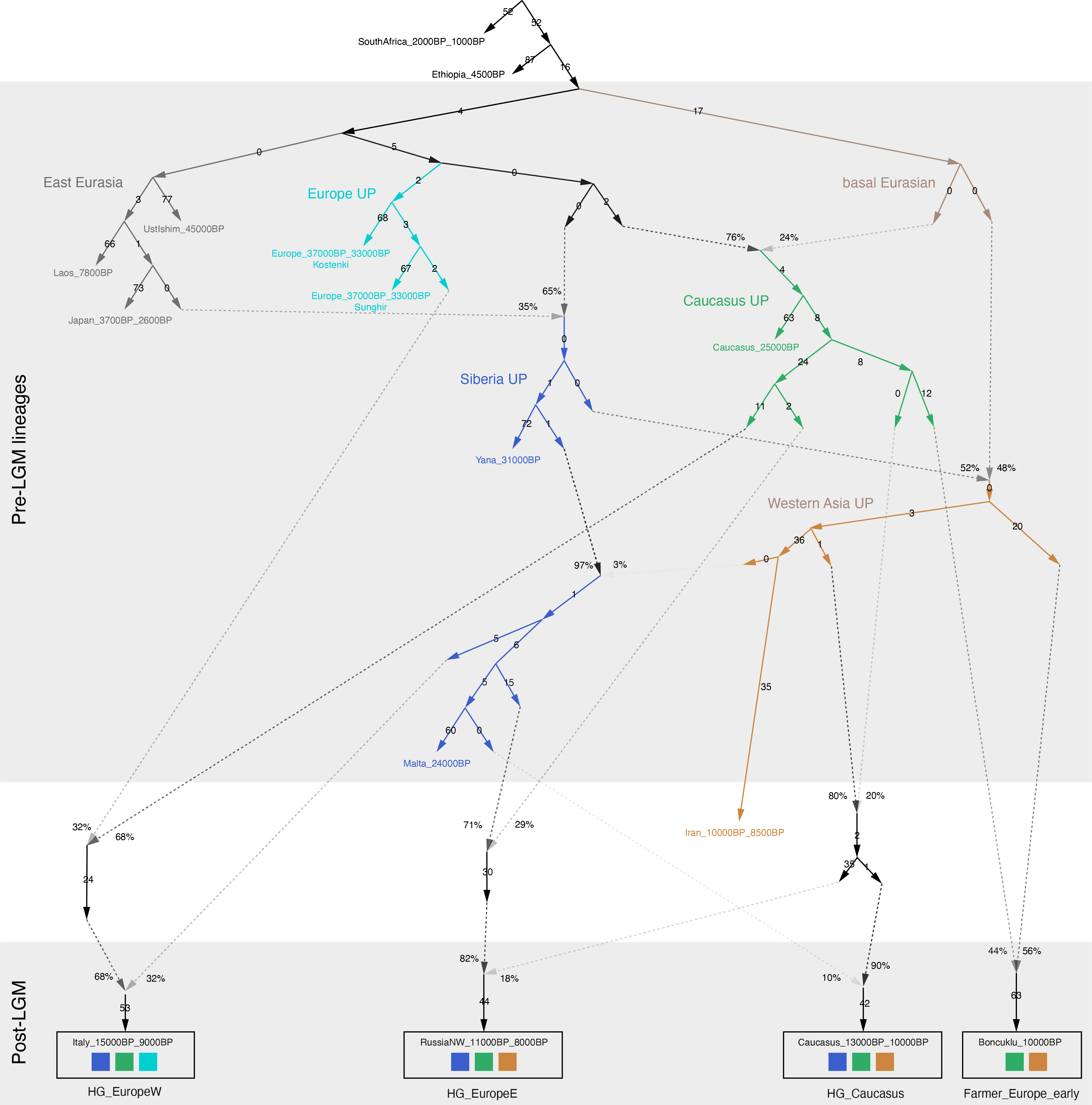
Admixture graph of deep Eurasian lineages (Allentoft et al. 2024)

An alternative model without the need of significant amounts of ANE ancestry has been presented by Vallini et al. (2024), suggesting that the initial Iranian hunter-gatherer-like population formed primarily from a deep Ancient West Eurasian lineage ('WEC2', c. 72%), and from varying degrees of Ancient East Eurasian (c. 10%) and Basal Eurasian (c. 18%) components. The Ancient West Eurasian component associated with Iranian hunter-gatherers (WEC2) is inferred to have diverged from the West Eurasian Core lineage (represented by Kostenki-14; WEC), with the WEC2 component staying in the region of the Iranian Plateau, while the proper WEC component expanded into Europe.

== Gallery ==
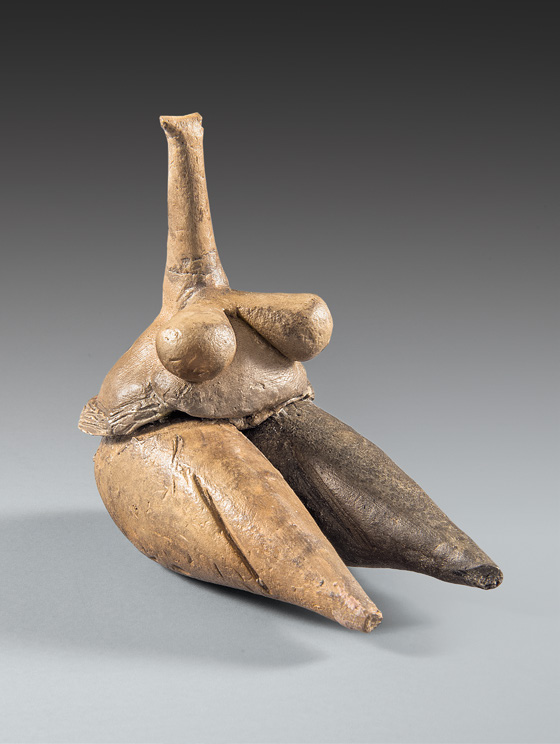
Clay human figurine (Fertility goddess) Tepe Sarab, near Ganj Dareh, Kermanshah ca. 7000-6100 BC, Neolithic period, National Museum of Iran

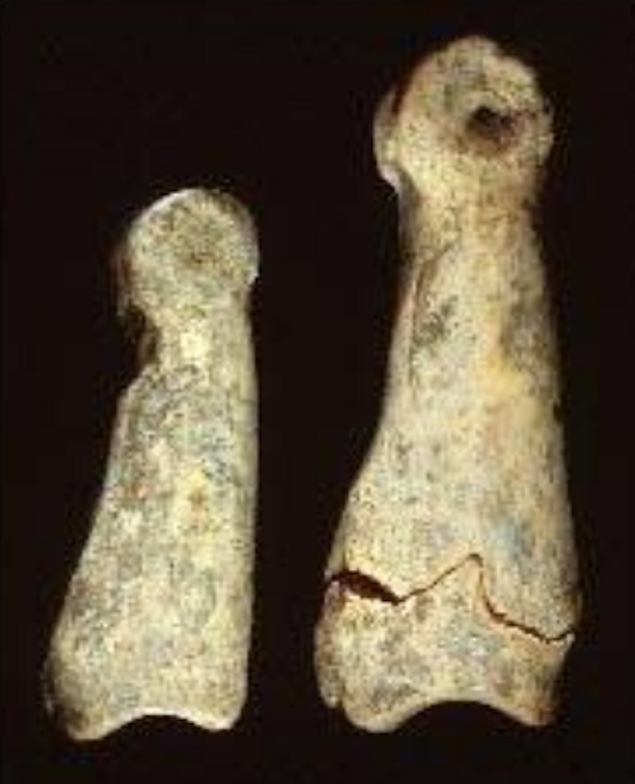
Ganj Dareh objects

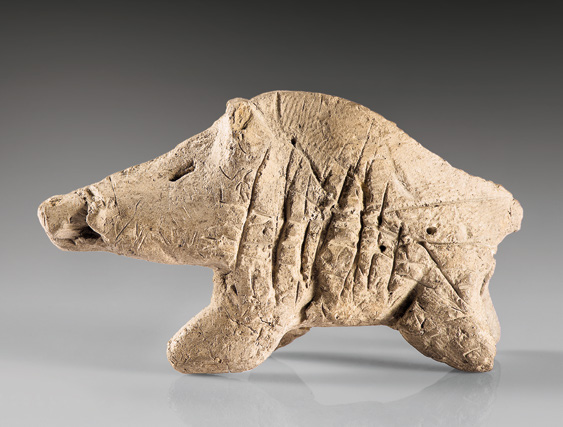
A clay boar figurine from the Neolithic period, found at Tepe Sarab, kept at the Museum of Ancient Iran

== Bibliography ==
- Agelarakis A., The Palaeopathological Evidence, Indicators of Stress of the Shanidar Proto-Neolithic and the Ganj-Dareh Tepe Early Neolithic Human Skeletal Collections. Columbia University, 1989, Doctoral Dissertation, UMI, Bell & Howell Information Company, Michigan 48106.
- Jones, Eppie R.; Gonzalez-Fortes, Gloria; Connell, Sarah; Siska, Veronika; et al. (2015). "Upper Palaeolithic genomes reveal deep roots of modern Eurasians". Nature Communications. 6 8912. Bibcode:2015NatCo...6.8912J. doi:10.1038/ncomms9912. PMC 4660371. PMID 26567969.
- Robert J. Wenke: "Patterns in Prehistory: Humankind's first three million years" (1990)
