= Ganj Darreh-ye Pain =

Village in Lorestan province, Iran

Ganj Darreh-ye Pain Persian: گنج دره پايين
- Village
- Location within Iran
- Coordinates: 33°49′47″N 47°50′44″E
- Country: Iran
- Province: Lorestan
- County: Delfan
- District: Mirbag
- Rural District: Mirbag-e Jonubi

Population (2016)
  - Total: 27
- Time zone: UTC+3:30 (IRST)

Ganj Darreh-ye Pain (Persian: گنج دره پايين) (Note: Also romanized as Ganj Darreh-ye Pā’īn; formerly known as Ganj Darreh-ye Sofla (گنج دره سفلي), also romanized as Ganj Darreh-ye Soflá; also known as Ganjereh-ye Vostā) is a village in Mirbag-e Jonubi Rural District of Mirbag District in Delfan County, Lorestan province, Iran.

== Demographics ==
=== Population ===
At the time of the 2006 National Census, the village's population, as Ganj Darreh-ye Sofla, was 74 in 18 households, when it was in the Central District. The following census in 2011 counted 59 people in 15 households, by which time the village was listed as Ganj Darreh-ye Pain. The 2016 census measured the population of the village as 27 people in six households.

In 2022, the rural district was separated from the district in the formation of Mirbag District.
