= Sarab-e Bardeh Zanjir-e Sofla =

Sarab-e Bardeh Zanjir-e Sofla سراب برده زنجيرسفلي
- Village
- Location within Iran
- Coordinates: 34°45′14″N 46°17′26″E
- Country: Iran
- Province: Kermanshah
- County: Javanrud
- Bakhsh: Central
- Rural District: Bazan

Population (2006)
  - Total: 196
- Time zone: UTC+3:30 (IRST)
  - Summer (DST): UTC+4:30 (IRDT)

Sarab-e Bardeh Zanjir-e Sofla (Persian: سراب برده زنجيرسفلي, also Romanized as Sarāb-e Bardeh Zanjīr-e Soflá; also known as Sarāb-e Bard Zanjīr, Sarāb-e Bard Zanjīr-e Soflá, and Sarāb-e Zanjīr) is a village in Bazan Rural District, in the Central District of Javanrud County, Kermanshah Province, Iran. At the 2006 census, its population was 196, in 43 families.
