= Zafaran, Qazvin =

Zafaran زعفران
- Village
- Location within Iran
- Coordinates: 36°06′18″N 50°07′04″E
- Country: Iran
- Province: Qazvin
- County: Abyek
- Bakhsh: Basharyat
- Rural District: Basharyat-e Gharbi

Population (2006)
  - Total: 241
- Time zone: UTC+3:30 (IRST)
  - Summer (DST): UTC+4:30 (IRDT)

Zafaran (Persian: زعفران, also Romanized as Za‘farān) is a village in Basharyat-e Gharbi Rural District, Basharyat District, Abyek County, Qazvin Province, Iran. At the 2006 census, its population was 241, in 63 families.
