= Sarab Khoshkeh-ye Sofla =

Sarab Khoshkeh-ye Sofla سراب خشكه سفلي
- Village
- Location within Iran
- Coordinates: 34°23′47″N 47°01′32″E
- Country: Iran
- Province: Kermanshah
- County: Kermanshah
- Bakhsh: Central
- Rural District: Baladarband

Population (2006)
  - Total: 62
- Time zone: UTC+3:30 (IRST)
  - Summer (DST): UTC+4:30 (IRDT)

Sarab Khoshkeh-ye Sofla (Persian: سراب خشكه سفلي, also Romanized as Sarāb Khoshkeh-ye Soflá and Sarāb-e Khoshkeh-ye Soflá; also known as Sarāb Khoshkeh-ye Pā’īn) is a village in Baladarband Rural District, in the Central District of Kermanshah County, Kermanshah Province, Iran. At the 2006 census, its population was 62, in 15 families.
