= Sarab-e Garm-e Olya =

Sarab-e Garm-e Olya سراب گرم عليا
- Village
- Location within Iran
- Coordinates: 34°25′45″N 45°50′47″E
- Country: Iran
- Province: Kermanshah
- County: Sarpol-e Zahab
- Bakhsh: Central
- Rural District: Howmeh-ye Sarpol

Population (2006)
  - Total: 319
- Time zone: UTC+3:30 (IRST)
  - Summer (DST): UTC+4:30 (IRDT)

Sarab-e Garm-e Olya (Persian: سراب گرم عليا, also Romanized as Sarāb-e Garm-e ‘Olyā; also known as Sarāb-e Garm, Sarāb Garm, and Sarābgarm) is a village in Howmeh-ye Sarpol Rural District, in the Central District of Sarpol-e Zahab County, Kermanshah Province, Iran. At the 2006 census, its population was 319, in 64 families.
