= Ganj Darreh-ye Bala =

Village in Lorestan province, Iran

Ganj Darreh-ye Bala Persian: گنج دره بالا
- Village
- Location within Iran
- Coordinates: 33°49′54″N 47°49′49″E
- Country: Iran
- Province: Lorestan
- County: Delfan
- District: Mirbag
- Rural District: Mirbag-e Jonubi

Population (2016)
  - Total: 193
- Time zone: UTC+3:30 (IRST)

Ganj Darreh-ye Bala (Persian: گنج دره بالا) (Note: Also romanized as Ganj Darreh-ye Bālā; formerly known as Ganj Darreh-ye Olya (گنج دره عليا), also romanized as Ganj Darreh-ye ‘Olyā; also known as Ganjereh-ye ‘Olyā) is a village in Mirbag-e Jonubi Rural District of Mirbag District in Delfan County, Lorestan province, Iran.

== Demographics ==
=== Population ===
At the time of the 2006 National Census, the village's population, as Ganj Darreh-ye Olya, was 241 in 50 households, when it was in the Central District. The following census in 2011 counted 206 people in 48 households, by which time the village was listed as Ganj Darreh-ye Bala. The 2016 census measured the population of the village as 193 people in 63 households.

In 2022, the rural district was separated from the district in the formation of Mirbag District.
