= Homeyl Rural District =

Rural district in Kermanshah province, Iran

Homeyl Rural District Persian: دهستان حميل
- Rural District
- Location within Iran
- Coordinates: 33°59′17″N 46°48′32″E
- Country: Iran
- Province: Kermanshah
- County: Shahabad-e Gharb
- District: Homeyl
- Capital: Homeyl

Population (2016)
  - Total: 5,291
- Time zone: UTC+3:30 (IRST)

Homeyl Rural District (Persian: دهستان حميل) is in Homeyl District of Eslamabad-e Gharb County, Kermanshah province, Iran. It is administered from the city of Homeyl.

== Demographics ==
=== Population ===
At the time of the 2006 National Census, the rural district's population was 5,753 in 1,290 households. There were 5,973 inhabitants in 1,605 households at the following census of 2011. The 2016 census measured the population of the rural district as 5,291 in 1,507 households. The most populous of its 20 villages was Gardangah-e Quchemi, with 686 people.
