= Harasam Rural District =

Rural district in Kermanshah province, Iran

Harasam Rural District Persian: دهستان هرسم
- Rural District
- Location within Iran
- Coordinates: 33°50′38″N 46°53′08″E
- Country: Iran
- Province: Kermanshah
- County: Shahabad-e Gharb
- District: Homeyl
- Capital: Qaleh-ye Harasam

Population (2016)
  - Total: 5,767
- Time zone: UTC+3:30 (IRST)

Harasam Rural District (Persian: دهستان هرسم) is in Homeyl District of Eslamabad-e Gharb County, Kermanshah province, Iran. Its capital is the village of Qaleh-ye Harasam.

== Demographics ==
=== Population ===
At the time of the 2006 National Census, the rural district's population was 8,132 in 1,840 households. There were 7,622 inhabitants in 1,983 households at the following census of 2011. The 2016 census measured the population of the rural district as 5,767 in 1,697 households. The most populous of its 24 villages was Kandeh-ye Har, with 1,089 people.

== See also ==
Shahbodagh, (Note: Formerly Shad Bolagh) a village in this rural district
