= Mansuri Rural District =

Rural district in Kermanshah province, Iran

Mansuri Rural District Persian: دهستان منصوری
- Rural District
- Location within Iran
- Coordinates: 33°50′15″N 46°45′23″E
- Country: Iran
- Province: Kermanshah
- County: Shahabad-e Gharb
- District: Homeyl
- Capital: Darbid-e Mansuri

Population (2016)
  - Total: 3,537
- Time zone: UTC+3:30 (IRST)

Mansuri Rural District (Persian: دهستان منصوری) is in Homeyl District of Eslamabad-e Gharb County, Kermanshah province, Iran. Its capital is the village of Darbid-e Mansuri.

== Demographics ==
=== Population ===
At the time of the 2006 National Census, the rural district's population was 4,685 in 1,046 households. There were 4,045 inhabitants in 1,038 households at the following census of 2011. The 2016 census measured the population of the rural district as 3,537 in 1,166 households. The most populous of its 35 villages was Garvani, with 513 people.
