= Homeyl District =

District in Kermanshah province, Iran

Homeyl District Persian: بخش حمیل
- District
- Location within Iran
- Coordinates: 33°53′57″N 46°47′46″E
- Country: Iran
- Province: Kermanshah
- County: Shahabad-e Gharb
- Capital: Homeyl

Population (2016)
  - Total: 15,912
- Time zone: UTC+3:30 (IRST)

Homeyl District (Persian: بخش حمیل) is in Eslamabad-e Gharb County, Kermanshah province, Iran. Its capital is the city of Homeyl.

== Demographics ==
=== Population ===
At the time of the 2006 National Census, the district's population was 19,873 in 4,482 households. The following census in 2011 counted 19,003 people in 4,992 households. The 2016 census measured the population of the district as 15,912 inhabitants in 4,747 households.

=== Administrative divisions ===
Homeyl District Population
Administrative Divisions	2006	2011	2016
Harasam RD	8,132	7,622	5,767
Homeyl RD	5,753	5,973	5,291
Mansuri RD	4,685	4,045	3,537
Homeyl (city)	1,303	1,363	1,317
Total	19,873	19,003	15,912
RD = Rural District
