= Eslamabad-e Gharb County =

County in Kermanshah province, Iran

Shahabad-e Gharb County Persian: شهرستان شاه‌آباد غرب
- County
- Location of Shahabad-e Ghrab (Eslamabad-e Gharb) County in Kermanshah Province (bottom, green)

- Location of Kermanshah Province in Iran
- Coordinates: 34°03′N 46°40′E
- Country: Iran
- Province: Kermanshah
- Capital: Shahabad-e Gharb
- Districts: Central, Homeyl

Population (2016)
  - Total: 140,876
- Time zone: UTC+3:30 (IRST)

Eslamabad-e Gharb County (Persian: شهرستان اسلام‌آباد غرب) or Shahabad- Ghrb County (Persian: شهرستان شاه‌آباد غرب) is in Kermanshah Province, Iran, part of what is unofficially referred to as Iranian Kurdistan. Its capital is the city of Eslamabad-e Gharb.

== Demographics ==
=== Population ===
At the time of the 2006 National Census, the county's population was 149,376 in 34,270 households. The following census in 2011 counted 151,473 people in 40,086 households. The 2016 census measured the population of the county as 140,876 in 40,911 households.

=== Administrative divisions ===
Shahabad-e Gharb County's population history and administrative structure over three consecutive censuses are shown in the following table.

Eslamabad-e Gharb County Population
Administrative Divisions	2006	2011	2016
Central District	129,503	132,123	124,304
Hasanabad Rural District	9,893	9,617	8,783
Howmeh-ye Jonubi RD	15,173	15,373	14,091
Howmeh-ye Shomali RD	8,206	5,801	5,129
Shiyan RD	6,801	6,633	5,742
Eslamabad-e Gharb (city)	89,430	94,699	90,559
Homeyl District	19,873	19,003	15,912
Harasam RD	8,132	7,622	5,767
Homeyl RD	5,753	5,973	5,291
Mansuri RD	4,685	4,045	3,537
Homeyl (city)	1,303	1,363	1,317
Total	149,376	151,473	140,876
RD = Rural District

== See also ==
- Kalhor

Media related to Eslamabad-e Gharb County at Wikimedia Commons
