= Elyasi =

Elyasi (Persian: الياسي) may refer to:

- Elyasi, Kermanshah
- Elyasi-ye Ahmad, Kermanshah Province
- Elyasi-ye Khalifeh Hoseyn, Kermanshah Province
- Elyasi-ye Mahmud, Kermanshah Province
- Elyasi-ye Saleh Matta, Kermanshah Province
- Elyasi, West Azerbaijan
