= Qaleh-ye Sefid =

Qaleh-ye Sefid or Qaleh-ye Safid or Qaleh Sefid or Qaleh Safid or Qalehsefid (Persian: قلعه سفيد) may refer to:

- Qaleh Sefid, Bushehr
- Qaleh Sefid, Fars
- Qaleh Sefid, Ilam
- Qaleh Sefid, Isfahan
- Qaleh Sefid, Ravansar, Kermanshah Province
- Qaleh Sefid, Salas-e Babajani, Kermanshah Province
- Qaleh Sefid-e Sheykh Hasan, Kermanshah Province
- Qaleh Sefid, Khuzestan
- Qaleh-ye Sefid, North Khorasan
- Qaleh Sefid, Razavi Khorasan

== See also ==
- Qaleh Sefid-e Olya (disambiguation)
- Qaleh Sefid-e Sofla (disambiguation)
