= Firuzeh (disambiguation) =

Firuzeh is a city in Razavi Khorasan Province, Iran.

Firuzeh (Persian: فيروزه) may refer to:

- Firuzeh, Kerman
- Firuzeh, Kermanshah
- Firuzeh, Zalu Ab, Kermanshah Province
- Firuzeh, North Khorasan
- Firuzeh, alternate name of Kalateh-ye Firuzeh, in North Khorasan Province, Iran
- Firuzeh, Dargaz, Razavi Khorasan Province
- Firuzeh County, an administrative subdivision of Razavi Khorasan Province, Iran
- Firuzeh Rural District, an administrative subdivision of Razavi Khorasan Province, Iran
