= Lachin (disambiguation) =

Lachin is a city in Azerbaijan.

Lachin (Persian: لاچين) may also refer to:

- Lachin, Kermanshah
- Lachin, West Azerbaijan
- Lachin corridor
- a male form of Lachina

== Distinguish from ==
- Lachine (disambiguation)
