= Esmail Kal =

Esmail Kal اسمائيل كل
- Village
- Location within Iran
- Coordinates: 34°32′29″N 46°43′55″E
- Country: Iran
- Province: Kermanshah
- County: Ravansar
- Bakhsh: Central
- Rural District: Hasanabad

Population (2006)
  - Total: 98
- Time zone: UTC+3:30 (IRST)
  - Summer (DST): UTC+4:30 (IRDT)

Esmail Kal (Persian: اسمائيل كل, also Romanized as Esmā‘īl Kal) is a village in Hasanabad Rural District, in the Central District of Ravansar County, Kermanshah Province, Iran. At the 2006 census, its population was 98, in 22 families.
