= Boz Gureh =

Boz Gureh بزگوره
- Village
- Location within Iran
- Coordinates: 34°52′12″N 46°28′12″E
- Country: Iran
- Province: Kermanshah
- County: Ravansar
- Bakhsh: Shahu
- Rural District: Quri Qaleh

Population (2006)
  - Total: 224
- Time zone: UTC+3:30 (IRST)
  - Summer (DST): UTC+4:30 (IRDT)

Bezgureh (Persian: بزگوره به کوردی بزوەڕە, also Romanized as Bizgūreh; also known as Bozvareh) is a village in Quri Qaleh Rural District, Shahu District, Ravansar County, Kermanshah Province, Iran. At the 2006 census, its population was 224, in 49 families.
