= Deh-e Leyli =

Deh-e Leyli ده ليلي
- Village
- Location within Iran
- Coordinates: 34°49′40″N 46°32′35″E
- Country: Iran
- Province: Kermanshah
- County: Ravansar
- Bakhsh: Shahu
- Rural District: Quri Qaleh

Population (2006)
  - Total: 453
- Time zone: UTC+3:30 (IRST)
  - Summer (DST): UTC+4:30 (IRDT)

Deh-e Leyli (Persian: ده ليلي, also romanized as Deh-e Leylī) is a village in Quri Qaleh Rural District, Shahu District, Ravansar County, Kermanshah Province, Iran. At the 2006 census, its population was 453, in 88 families.
