= Meskinabad-e Olya =

Meskinabad-e Olya مسكين ابادعليا
- Village
- Location within Iran
- Coordinates: 34°40′48″N 46°38′46″E
- Country: Iran
- Province: Kermanshah
- County: Ravansar
- Bakhsh: Central
- Rural District: Badr

Population (2006)
  - Total: 104
- Time zone: UTC+3:30 (IRST)
  - Summer (DST): UTC+4:30 (IRDT)

Meskinabad-e Olya (Persian: مسكين ابادعليا, also Romanized as Meskīnābād-e ‘Olyā) is a village in Badr Rural District, in the Central District of Ravansar County, Kermanshah Province, Iran. At the 2006 census, its population was 104, in 22 families.
