= Nahrabi =

Village in Kermanshah Province, Iran

Nahrabi نهرابي
- Village
- Location within Iran
- Coordinates: 34°40′10″N 46°34′07″E
- Country: Iran
- Province: Kermanshah
- County: Ravansar
- Bakhsh: Central
- Rural District: Zalu Ab

Population (2006)
  - Total: 355
- Time zone: UTC+3:30 (IRST)
  - Summer (DST): UTC+4:30 (IRDT)

Nahrabi (Persian: نهرابي, also Romanized as Nahrābī; also known as Nahravī, Nahr-e Ābī, Nārābī, and Nārāwī) is a village in Zalu Ab Rural District, in the Central District of Ravansar County, Kermanshah Province, Iran. At the 2006 census, its population was 355, in 71 families.
