= Kani Khazran =

Kani Khazran كاني خضران
- Village
- Location within Iran
- Coordinates: 34°46′15″N 46°35′44″E
- Country: Iran
- Province: Kermanshah
- County: Ravansar
- Bakhsh: Central
- Rural District: Badr

Population (2006)
  - Total: 139
- Time zone: UTC+3:30 (IRST)
  - Summer (DST): UTC+4:30 (IRDT)

Kani Khazran (Persian: كاني خضران, also Romanized as Kānī Khaẕrān) is a village in Badr Rural District, in the Central District of Ravansar County, Kermanshah Province, Iran. At the 2006 census, its population was 139, in 28 families.
