= Lemini =

Lemini لميني
- Village
- Location within Iran
- Coordinates: 34°38′18″N 46°36′46″E
- Country: Iran
- Province: Kermanshah
- County: Ravansar
- Bakhsh: Central
- Rural District: Zalu Ab

Population (2006)
  - Total: 135
- Time zone: UTC+3:30 (IRST)
  - Summer (DST): UTC+4:30 (IRDT)

Lemini (Persian: لميني, also Romanized as Lemīnī; also known as Labanī) is a village in Zalu Ab Rural District, in the Central District of Ravansar County, Kermanshah Province, Iran. At the 2006 census, its population was 135, in 29 families.
