= Gorg Abi Mirza Ali =

Gorg Abi Mirza Ali گرگابي ميرزاعلي
- Village
- Location within Iran
- Coordinates: 34°36′18″N 46°38′27″E
- Country: Iran
- Province: Kermanshah
- County: Ravansar
- Bakhsh: Central
- Rural District: Hasanabad

Population (2006)
  - Total: 137
- Time zone: UTC+3:30 (IRST)
  - Summer (DST): UTC+4:30 (IRDT)

Gorg Abi Mirza Ali (Persian: گرگابي ميرزاعلي, also Romanized as Gorg Ābī Mīrzā ʿAlī; also known as Gorg Ābī) is a village in Hasanabad Rural District, in the Central District of Ravansar County, Kermanshah Province, Iran. At the 2006 census, its population was 137, in 32 families.
