= Kalaveh =

Kalaveh (Persian: كلاوه) may refer to:

- Kalaveh, Ravansar
- Kalaveh-ye Heydar Khan, Ravansar County
- Kalaveh, Sarpol-e Zahab
