= Elyas =

Elyas is a variant of the name Elias/Elijah and may refer to:

== People ==
- Elyas Afewerki (born 1992), Eritrean cyclist
- Elyas de Daneis (fl. 13th century), English university vice-chancellor
- Elyas Omar (1936–2018), third Mayor of Kuala Lumpur, Malaysia
- Elyas M'Barek (born 1982), Austrian actor

== Places ==
- Elyas-e Khalifeh Hoseyn, Kermanshah Province, Iran
- Elyas-e Mahmud, Kermanshah Province, Iran
- Elyas, Khuzestan, Iran

== See also ==
- Elias, Greek variant of the name
