= Gomeshtar-e Olya =

Gomeshtar-e Olya گمشترعليا
- Village
- Location within Iran
- Coordinates: 34°40′00″N 46°35′20″E
- Country: Iran
- Province: Kermanshah
- County: Ravansar
- Bakhsh: Central
- Rural District: Zalu Ab

Population (2006)
  - Total: 190
- Time zone: UTC+3:30 (IRST)
  - Summer (DST): UTC+4:30 (IRDT)

Gomeshtar-e Olya (Persian: گمشترعليا, also Romanized as Gomeshtar-e ‘Olyā) is a village in Zalu Ab Rural District, in the Central District of Ravansar County, Kermanshah Province, Iran. At the 2006 census, its population was 190, in 41 families.
