= Deh Sadeh =

Deh Sadeh ده ساده
- Village
- Location within Iran
- Coordinates: 34°38′01″N 46°40′25″E
- Country: Iran
- Province: Kermanshah
- County: Ravansar
- Bakhsh: Central
- Rural District: Hasanabad

Population (2006)
  - Total: 93
- Time zone: UTC+3:30 (IRST)
  - Summer (DST): UTC+4:30 (IRDT)

Deh Sadeh (Persian: ده ساده, also Romanized as Deh Sādeh) is a village in Hasanabad Rural District, in the Central District of Ravansar County, Kermanshah Province, Iran. At the 2006 census, its population was 93, in 17 families.
