= Cheshmeh Miran =

Cheshmeh Miran چشمه ميران
- Village
- Location within Iran
- Coordinates: 34°50′04″N 46°30′49″E
- Country: Iran
- Province: Kermanshah
- County: Ravansar
- Bakhsh: Shahu
- Rural District: Quri Qaleh

Population (2006)
  - Total: 195
- Time zone: UTC+3:30 (IRST)
  - Summer (DST): UTC+4:30 (IRDT)

Cheshmeh Miran (Persian: چشمه ميران, also Romanized as Cheshmeh Mīrān) is a village in Quri Qaleh Rural District, Shahu District, Ravansar County, Kermanshah Province, Iran. At the 2006 census, its population was 195, in 42 families.
