= Banavachku =

Banavachku بناوچكو
- Village
- Location within Iran
- Coordinates: 34°38′29″N 46°28′24″E
- Country: Iran
- Province: Kermanshah
- County: Ravansar
- Bakhsh: Central
- Rural District: Dowlatabad

Population (2006)
  - Total: 138
- Time zone: UTC+3:30 (IRST)
  - Summer (DST): UTC+4:30 (IRDT)

Banavachku (Persian: بناوچكو, also Romanized as Banāvachkū; also known as Banāvachkāh and Banāvajkūh) is a village in Dowlatabad Rural District, in the Central District of Ravansar County, Kermanshah Province, Iran. At the 2006 census, its population was 138, in 24 families.
