= Qalanjeh =

Qalanjeh قلانجه
- Village
- Location within Iran
- Coordinates: 34°41′15″N 46°38′44″E
- Country: Iran
- Province: Kermanshah
- County: Ravansar
- Bakhsh: Central
- Rural District: Badr

Population (2006)
  - Total: 30
- Time zone: UTC+3:30 (IRST)
  - Summer (DST): UTC+4:30 (IRDT)

Qalanjeh (Persian: قلانجه, also Romanized as Qalānjeh; also known as Kalānchāh and Qalāncheh) is a village in Badr Rural District, in the Central District of Ravansar County, Kermanshah Province, Iran. At the 2006 census, its population was 30, in 7 families.
