= Kani Kechkineh =

Kani Kochkinah كانی کُچكينه
- Village
- Location within Iran
- Coordinates: 34°42′35″N 46°35′20″E
- Country: Iran
- Province: Kermanshah
- County: Ravansar
- Bakhsh: Central
- Rural District: Badr

Population (2006)
  - Total: 89
- Time zone: UTC+3:30 (IRST)
  - Summer (DST): UTC+4:30 (IRDT)

Kani Kochkinah (Kurdish: كانی کۆچكينه, Persian: كانی کُچكينه, also Romanized as Kānī Kochkīnah) is a village in Badr Rural District, in the Central District of Ravansar County, Kermanshah Province, Iran. At the 2006 census, its population was 89, in 23 families.
