= Sabz Bolagh =

Sabz Bolagh سبزبلاغ
- Village
- Location within Iran
- Coordinates: 34°34′09″N 46°35′23″E
- Country: Iran
- Province: Kermanshah
- County: Ravansar
- Bakhsh: Central
- Rural District: Zalu Ab

Population (2006)
  - Total: 185
- Time zone: UTC+3:30 (IRST)
  - Summer (DST): UTC+4:30 (IRDT)

Sabz Bolagh (Persian: سبزبلاغ, also Romanized as Sabz Bolāgh; also known as Sabzeh Bolāgh) is a village in Zalu Ab Rural District, in the Central District of Ravansar County, Kermanshah Province, Iran. At the 2006 census, its population was 185, in 36 families.
