= Kanduleh, Ravansar =

Kanduleh كندوله
- Village
- Location within Iran
- Coordinates: 34°36′39″N 46°32′04″E
- Country: Iran
- Province: Kermanshah
- County: Ravansar
- Bakhsh: Central
- Rural District: Zalu Ab

Population (2006)
  - Total: 169
- Time zone: UTC+3:30 (IRST)
  - Summer (DST): UTC+4:30 (IRDT)

Kanduleh (Persian: كندوله, also Romanized as Kandūleh) is a village in Zalu Ab Rural District, in the Central District of Ravansar County, Kermanshah Province, Iran. At the 2006 census, its population was 169, in 34 families.
