= Qaleh-ye Khoda Morovvat =

Qaleh-ye Khoda Morovvat قلعه خدامروت
- Village
- Location within Iran
- Coordinates: 34°35′46″N 46°35′43″E
- Country: Iran
- Province: Kermanshah
- County: Ravansar
- Bakhsh: Central
- Rural District: Zalu Ab

Population (2006)
  - Total: 125
- Time zone: UTC+3:30 (IRST)
  - Summer (DST): UTC+4:30 (IRDT)

Qaleh-ye Khoda Morovvat (Persian: قلعه خدامروت, also Romanized as Qal‘eh-ye Khodā Morovvat; also known as Qal‘a Khamrud Khan, Qal‘eh Khamrud Khan, Qal‘eh Khodā Morovvat Khān, Qal‘eh-ye Khodā Morovat Khān, Qal‘eh-ye Khodā Morovvatkhān, and Qal‘eh-ye Khodā Morovvat Khān) is a village in Zalu Ab Rural District, in the Central District of Ravansar County, Kermanshah Province, Iran. At the 2006 census, its population was 125, in 24 families.
