= Zirjubi =

Zirjubi زيرجوبي
- Village
- Location within Iran
- Coordinates: 34°44′48″N 46°37′20″E
- Country: Iran
- Province: Kermanshah
- County: Ravansar
- Bakhsh: Central
- Rural District: Badr

Population (2006)
  - Total: 132
- Time zone: UTC+3:30 (IRST)
  - Summer (DST): UTC+4:30 (IRDT)

Zirjubi (Persian: زيرجوبي, also Romanized as Zīrjūbī) is a village in Badr Rural District, in the Central District of Ravansar County, Kermanshah Province, Iran. At the 2006 census, its population was 132, in 28 families.
