= Cheshmeh Panbeh =

Cheshmeh Panbeh چشمه پنبه
- Village
- Location within Iran
- Coordinates: 34°37′16″N 46°45′54″E
- Country: Iran
- Province: Kermanshah
- County: Ravansar
- Bakhsh: Central
- Rural District: Hasanabad

Population (2006)
  - Total: 79
- Time zone: UTC+3:30 (IRST)
  - Summer (DST): UTC+4:30 (IRDT)

Cheshmeh Panbeh (Persian: چشمه پنبه) is a village in Hasanabad Rural District, in the Central District of Ravansar County, Kermanshah Province, Iran. At the 2006 census, its population was 79, in 17 families.
