= Qaleh-ye Zakaria =

Qaleh-ye Zakaria قلعه ذكريا
- Village
- Location within Iran
- Coordinates: 34°36′09″N 46°41′01″E
- Country: Iran
- Province: Kermanshah
- County: Ravansar
- Bakhsh: Central
- Rural District: Hasanabad

Population (2006)
  - Total: 258
- Time zone: UTC+3:30 (IRST)
  - Summer (DST): UTC+4:30 (IRDT)

Qaleh-ye Zakaria (Persian: قلعه ذكريا, also Romanized as Qal‘eh-ye Z̄akarīā and Qal‘eh-ye Z̄akarīyā) is a village in Hasanabad Rural District, in the Central District of Ravansar County, Kermanshah Province, Iran. At the 2006 census, its population was 258, in 58 families.
