= Kazaz (disambiguation) =

Kazaz is a collection of villages and small towns that are in a short distance from Arak, Iran.

Kazaz is also a surname. Notable people with the surname:

- Emil Kazaz (born 1953), American-Armenian figurative sculptor and painter
- Enver Kazaz (born 1962), Bosnian literary historian, literary critic, writer, social commentator and publicist
- Tuğçe Kazaz (born 1982), Turkish model, actress and Miss Turkey 2001

== See also ==
- Kazaziye, also known as Kazazlık or Kazaz, a handmade jewelry technique
- Kazazi, Iran, a village in Dowlatabad Rural District, in the Central District of Ravansar County, Kermanshah Province, Iran
- Kazazian, an Armenian surname made up of Kazaz and -ian
