= Deh Cheragh =

Deh Cheragh ده چراغ
- Village
- Location within Iran
- Coordinates: 34°38′11″N 46°35′21″E
- Country: Iran
- Province: Kermanshah
- County: Ravansar
- Bakhsh: Central
- Rural District: Zalu Ab

Population (2006)
  - Total: 148
- Time zone: UTC+3:30 (IRST)
  - Summer (DST): UTC+4:30 (IRDT)

Deh Cheragh (Persian: ده چراغ, also Romanized as Deh Cherāgh) is a village in Zalu Ab Rural District, in the Central District of Ravansar County, Kermanshah Province, Iran. At the 2006 census, its population was 148, in 33 families.
