= Lurabi =

Lurabi لورابي
- Village
- Location within Iran
- Coordinates: 34°53′11″N 46°26′24″E
- Country: Iran
- Province: Kermanshah
- County: Ravansar
- Bakhsh: Shahu
- Rural District: Quri Qaleh

Population (2006)
  - Total: 45
- Time zone: UTC+3:30 (IRST)
  - Summer (DST): UTC+4:30 (IRDT)

Lurabi (Persian: لورابي, also Romanized as Lūrābī) is a village in Quri Qaleh Rural District, Shahu District, Ravansar County, Kermanshah Province, Iran. At the 2006 census, its population was 45, in 6 families.
