= Gilanbar-e Sofla =

Gilanbar-e Sofla گيلانبرسفلي
- Village
- Location within Iran
- Coordinates: 34°40′12″N 46°28′42″E
- Country: Iran
- Province: Kermanshah
- County: Ravansar
- Bakhsh: Central
- Rural District: Dowlatabad

Population (2006)
  - Total: 69
- Time zone: UTC+3:30 (IRST)
  - Summer (DST): UTC+4:30 (IRDT)

Gilanbar-e Sofla (Persian: گيلانبرسفلي, also Romanized as Gīlānbar-e Soflá; also known as Gīlānbar-e Bālā) is a village in Dowlatabad Rural District, in the Central District of Ravansar County, Kermanshah Province, Iran. At the 2006 census, its population was 69, in 12 families.
