= Gorgi Dar =

Gorgi Dar گرگيدر
- Village
- Location within Iran
- Coordinates: 34°43′50″N 46°44′29″E
- Country: Iran
- Province: Kermanshah
- County: Ravansar
- Bakhsh: Central
- Rural District: Badr

Population (2006)
  - Total: 281
- Time zone: UTC+3:30 (IRST)
  - Summer (DST): UTC+4:30 (IRDT)

Gorgi Dar (Persian: گرگيدر, also romanized as Gorgī Dar and Gorgīdar) is a village in Badr Rural District, in the Central District of Ravansar County, Kermanshah Province, Iran. At the 2006 census, its population was 281, in 55 families.
