= Khanileh, Kermanshah =

Khanileh خانيله
- Village
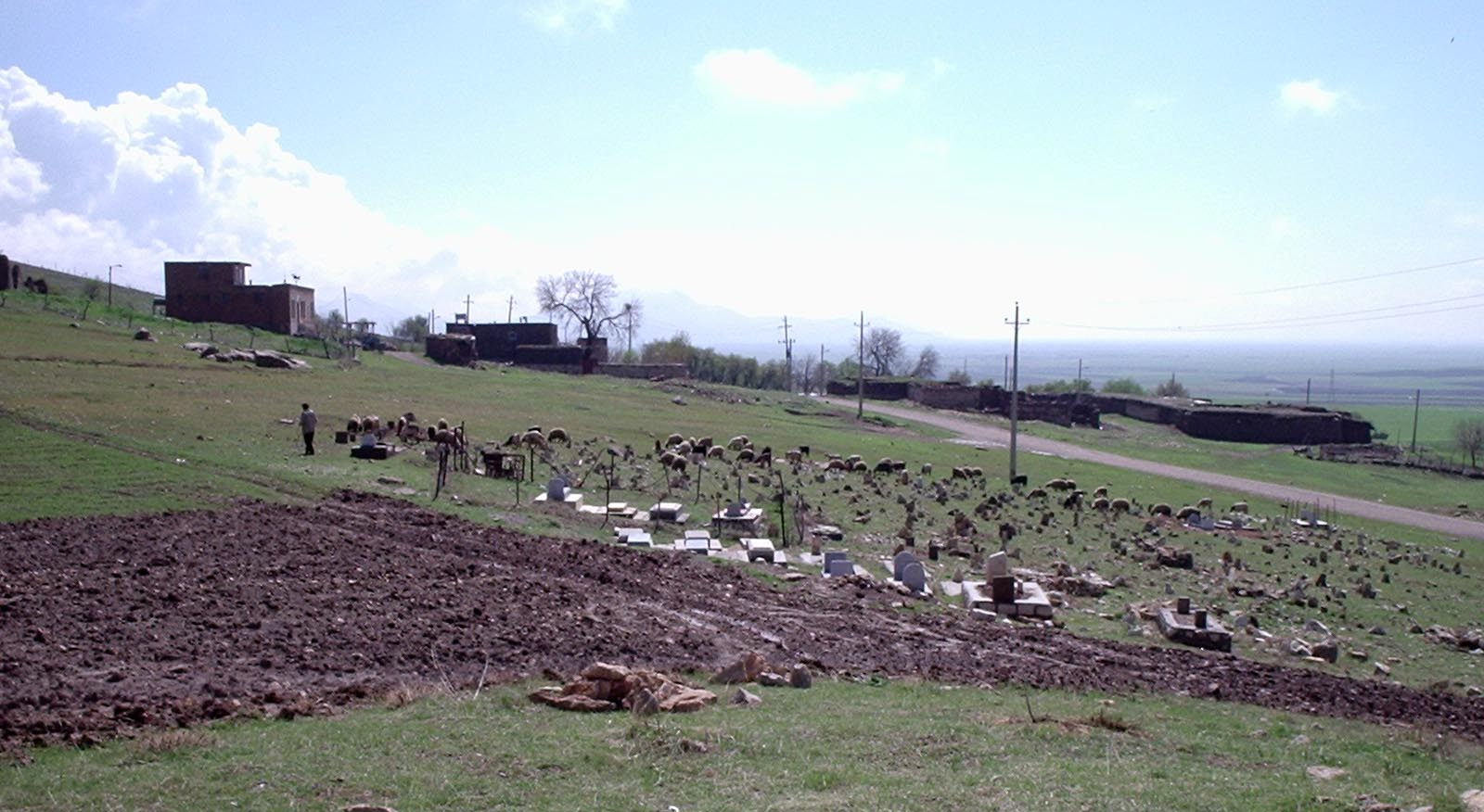
- Khanileh

- Location within Iran
- Coordinates: 34°40′34″N 46°37′11″E
- Country: Iran
- Province: Kermanshah
- County: Ravansar
- Bakhsh: Central
- Rural District: Dowlatabad
- Time zone: UTC+3:30 (IRST)
  - Summer (DST): UTC+4:30 (IRDT)

Khanileh (Persian: خانيله, also Romanized as Khānīleh; Kurdish: Xaníle) is a village in Dowlatabad Rural District, in the Central District of Ravansar County, Kermanshah province, Iran. At the 2006 census, its existence was noted, but its population was not reported.

Khanileh is located 6 km to SW of Ravansar and ca. 56 km to NW of Kermanshah, in Western Iran. It lies at southern slopes of the hilly range of Salakan and it has a commanding view on the Gomeshter (Garaw) plain. Salakan is a part of radiolarian belt and has numerous springs outlets on its northern and southern slopes. The presence of these springs and commanding view of Khanileh over the plain attracted prehistoric people to the area since the Chalcolithic period and the early occupations continued to the Bronze and Iron Ages. The remains of these early occupations are visible on an ancient mound at west of the village and an ancient cemetery of Iron Age period in the village itself. TL dating of a number of sherds from western mound has revealed two groups of dates: fourth mill bc. and first mill. bc. There is a low mound with Parthian occupation remains at south of the village called Tapa Bawa. These sites were surveyed in 1986 and 2006 that led to discovery a number of sherds and lithic artifacts. Presence of Islamic age potsherds indicates that the village was an occupation site during this period.

A very old mulberry tree (Ophith morus persicus) that according to local people is older than 150 years was cut in 2011 by the owner of the nearby garden. A photo of the tree taken in 2009
