= Kani Pasha =

Chenaran چناران
- Village
- Location within Iran
- Coordinates: 34°41′24″N 46°27′00″E
- Country: Iran
- Province: Kermanshah
- County: Ravansar
- Bakhsh: Central
- Rural District: Dowlatabad

Population (2006)
  - Total: 112
- Time zone: UTC+3:30 (IRST)
  - Summer (DST): UTC+4:30 (IRDT)

Kani Pasha (Persian: كاني پاشا, also Romanized as Kānī Pāshā) is a village in Dowlatabad Rural District, in the Central District of Ravansar County, Kermanshah Province, Iran. At the 2006 census, its population was 112, in 20 families.
