= Malekshah =

Malekshah ملكشاه
- Village
- Location within Iran
- Coordinates: 34°32′45″N 46°38′11″E
- Country: Iran
- Province: Kermanshah
- County: Ravansar
- Bakhsh: Central
- Rural District: Zalu Ab

Population (2006)
  - Total: 29
- Time zone: UTC+3:30 (IRST)
  - Summer (DST): UTC+4:30 (IRDT)

Malekshah (Persian: ملكشاه, also Romanized as Malekshāh) is a village in Zalu Ab Rural District, in the Central District of Ravansar County, Kermanshah Province, Iran. At the 2006 census, its population was 29, in 7 families.
