= Deh-e Baugah =

Deh-e Baugah ده باوگه
- Village
- Location within Iran
- Coordinates: 34°45′08″N 46°39′53″E
- Country: Iran
- Province: Kermanshah
- County: Ravansar
- Bakhsh: Central
- Rural District: Badr

Population (2006)
  - Total: 79
- Time zone: UTC+3:30 (IRST)
  - Summer (DST): UTC+4:30 (IRDT)

Deh-e Baugah (Persian: ده باوگه, also Romanized as Deh-e Bāūgah and Dehbaowkah) is a village in Badr Rural District, in the Central District of Ravansar County, Kermanshah Province, Iran. At the 2006 census, its population was 79, in 17 families.
