= Qaleh-ye Reza =

Village in Kermanshah, Iran

Qaleh-ye Reza قلعه رضا
- Village
- Location within Iran
- Coordinates: 34°36′03″N 46°41′11″E
- Country: Iran
- Province: Kermanshah
- County: Ravansar
- Bakhsh: Central
- Rural District: Hasanabad

Population (2006)
  - Total: 39
- Time zone: UTC+3:30 (IRST)
  - Summer (DST): UTC+4:30 (IRDT)

Qaleh-ye Reza (Persian: قلعه رضا, also Romanized as Qal‘eh-ye Reẕā and Qal‘eh Rez̧ā; also known as Qal‘a Ruza and Qal‘eh Ruza) is a village in Hasanabad Rural District, in the Central District of Ravansar County, Kermanshah Province, Iran. At the 2006 census, its population was 39, in 10 families.
