= Kareh-ye Qaleh Kohneh =

Village in Kermanshah, Iran

Kareh-ye Qaleh Kohneh كره قلعه كهنه
- Village
- Location within Iran
- Coordinates: 34°39′23″N 46°31′53″E
- Country: Iran
- Province: Kermanshah
- County: Ravansar
- Bakhsh: Central
- Rural District: Dowlatabad

Population (2006)
  - Total: 94
- Time zone: UTC+3:30 (IRST)
  - Summer (DST): UTC+4:30 (IRDT)

Kareh-ye Qaleh Kohneh (Persian: كره قلعه كهنه, also Romanized as Kareh-e Qal‘eh Kohneh; also known as Kūh Qal‘eh Sefīd) is a village in Dowlatabad Rural District, in the Central District of Ravansar County, Kermanshah Province, Iran. At the 2006 census, its population was 94, in 23 families.
