= Gorazabad =

Gorazabad (Persian: گرازاباد) may refer to:

- Gorazabad, Chaharmahal and Bakhtiari
- Gorazabad, Hormozgan
- Gorazabad, Kerman
- Gorazabad, Kermanshah
