= Qalayen =

Qalayen قلاين
- Village
- Location within Iran
- Coordinates: 34°42′37″N 46°43′13″E
- Country: Iran
- Province: Kermanshah
- County: Ravansar
- Bakhsh: Central
- Rural District: Badr

Population (2006)
  - Total: 211
- Time zone: UTC+3:30 (IRST)
  - Summer (DST): UTC+4:30 (IRDT)

Qalayen (Persian: قلاين, also Romanized as Qalāyen; also known as Kaleh Yan and Qal‘eh Yan) is a village in Badr Rural District, in the Central District of Ravansar County, Kermanshah Province, Iran. At the 2006 census, its population was 211, in 39 families.
