= Bansheleh =

Bansheleh بانشله
- Village
- Location within Iran
- Coordinates: 34°44′15″N 46°34′10″E
- Country: Iran
- Province: Kermanshah
- County: Ravansar
- Bakhsh: Central
- Rural District: Badr

Population (2006)
  - Total: 83
- Time zone: UTC+3:30 (IRST)
  - Summer (DST): UTC+4:30 (IRDT)

Bansheleh (Persian: بانشله, also Romanized as Bānsheleh; also known as Banishellah, Banshala, and Boncheleh) is a village in Badr Rural District, in the Central District of Ravansar County, Kermanshah Province, Iran. At the 2006 census, its population was 83, in 17 families.
