= Benavach =

Benavach بناوچ
- Village
- Location within Iran
- Coordinates: 34°46′35″N 46°36′01″E
- Country: Iran
- Province: Kermanshah
- County: Ravansar
- Bakhsh: Central
- Rural District: Badr

Population (2006)
  - Total: 166
- Time zone: UTC+3:30 (IRST)
  - Summer (DST): UTC+4:30 (IRDT)

Benavach (Persian: بناوچ, also Romanized as Benāvach and Banāwach; also known as Banāvaj and Benāvaj) is a village in Badr Rural District, in the Central District of Ravansar County, Kermanshah Province, Iran. At the 2021 census, its population was 80, in 24 families.
