= Shahrak-e Boniad =

Shahrak-e Boniad شهرك بنياد
- Village
- Country: Iran
- Province: Kermanshah
- County: Ravansar
- Bakhsh: Central
- Rural District: Badr

Population (2006)
  - Total: 383
- Time zone: UTC+3:30 (IRST)
  - Summer (DST): UTC+4:30 (IRDT)

Shahrak-e Boniad (Persian: شهرك بنياد, also Romanized as Shahrak-e Bonīād) is a village in Badr Rural District, in the Central District of Ravansar County, Kermanshah Province, Iran. At the 2006 census, its population was 383, in 86 families.
