= Selekan =

Selekan سلكان
- Village
- Location within Iran
- Coordinates: 34°41′39″N 46°37′17″E
- Country: Iran
- Province: Kermanshah
- County: Ravansar
- Bakhsh: Central
- Rural District: Badr

Population (2006)
  - Total: 119
- Time zone: UTC+3:30 (IRST)
  - Summer (DST): UTC+4:30 (IRDT)

Selekan (Persian: سلكان, also Romanized as Selekān; also known as Selehkān) is a village in Badr Rural District, in the Central District of Ravansar County, Kermanshah Province, Iran. At the 2006 census, its population was 119, in 27 families.
