= Baba Heyran =

Baba Heyran باباحيران
- Village
- Location within Iran
- Coordinates: 34°37′33″N 46°44′43″E
- Country: Iran
- Province: Kermanshah
- County: Ravansar
- Bakhsh: Central
- Rural District: Hasanabad

Population (2006)
  - Total: 25
- Time zone: UTC+3:30 (IRST)
  - Summer (DST): UTC+4:30 (IRDT)

Baba Heyran (Persian: باباحيران, also Romanized as Bābā Ḩeyrān; also known as Bābā Jeyrān) is a village in Hasanabad Rural District, in the Central District of Ravansar County, Kermanshah Province, Iran. At the 2006 census, its population was 25, in 5 families.
