= Makhoshin =

Makhoshin ماخوشين
- Village
- Location within Iran
- Coordinates: 34°37′57″N 46°31′06″E
- Country: Iran
- Province: Kermanshah
- County: Ravansar
- Bakhsh: Central
- Rural District: Dowlatabad

Population (2006)
  - Total: 277
- Time zone: UTC+3:30 (IRST)
  - Summer (DST): UTC+4:30 (IRDT)

Makhvoshin (Persian: ماخوشين, also romanized as Mākhvoshīn and Mākhūshīn) is a village in Dowlatabad Rural District, in the Central District of Ravansar County, Kermanshah Province, Iran. At the 2006 census, its population was 277, in 49 families. Makhoshin is located in Ravansar County, an area with archaeological evidence of human habitation dating back to prehistoric times.
