= Qeshlaq, Ravansar =

Neighborhood in Kermanshah province, Iran

Qeshlaq Persian: قشلاق
- Neighborhood
- Location within Iran
- Coordinates: 34°55′53″N 46°27′46″E
- Country: Iran
- Province: Kermanshah
- County: Ravansar
- District: Shahu
- City: Shahu

Population (2006)
  - Total: 1,164
- Time zone: UTC+3:30 (IRST)

Qeshlaq (Persian: قشلاق) (Note: Also romanized as Qeshlāq; also known as Qeshlāg and Qīshlāq) is a neighborhood in the city of Shahu in Shahu District of Ravansar County, Kermanshah province, Iran. As a village, it was the capital of Mansur-e Aqai Rural District until its administrative center was transferred to Shahu.

== Demographics ==
=== Population ===
At the time of the 2006 National Census, Qeshlaq's population was 1,164 in 279 households, when it was a village in Mansur-e Aqai Rural District.

In 2008, the village of Mansur-e Aqai merged with Qeshlaq and was elevated to city status as Shahu.
