= Deh-e Janjan =

Deh-e Janjan ده جان جان
- Village
- Location within Iran
- Coordinates: 34°37′54″N 46°33′58″E
- Country: Iran
- Province: Kermanshah
- County: Ravansar
- Bakhsh: Central
- Rural District: Zalu Ab

Population (2006)
  - Total: 102
- Time zone: UTC+3:30 (IRST)
  - Summer (DST): UTC+4:30 (IRDT)

Deh-e Janjan (Persian: ده جان جان, also Romanized as Deh-e Jānjān; also known as Jānjān) is a village in Zalu Ab Rural District, in the Central District of Ravansar County, Kermanshah Province, Iran. At the 2006 census, its population was 102, in 25 families.
