= Tazehabad-e Serias =

Village in Kermanshah province, Iran

Tazehabad-e Serias Persian: تازه اباد سرياس
- Village
- Location within Iran
- Coordinates: 34°58′12″N 46°25′46″E
- Country: Iran
- Province: Kermanshah
- County: Ravansar
- District: Shahu
- Rural District: Mansur-e Aqai

Population (2016)
  - Total: 685
- Time zone: UTC+3:30 (IRST)

Tazehabad-e Serias (Persian: تازه ابادسرياس) (Note: Also romanized as Tāzehābād-e Serīās) is a village in Mansur-e Aqai Rural District of Shahu District, Ravansar County, Kermanshah province, Iran.

== Demographics ==
=== Population ===
At the time of the 2006 National Census, the village's population was 767 in 183 households. The following census in 2011 counted 802 people in 208 households. The 2016 census measured the population of the village as 685 people in 195 households. It was the most populous village in its rural district.
