= Shabankareh (disambiguation) =

Shabankareh is a city in Bushehr Province, Iran.

Shabankareh (Persian: شبانكاره) may also refer to:

- Shabankareh, Kermanshah
- Shabankareh, Razavi Khorasan
- Shabankareh District, in Bushehr Province
- Shabankara, an ancient tribal federation
