= Nowruleh-ye Olya =

Nowruleh-ye Olya نوروله عليا
- Village
- Location within Iran
- Coordinates: 34°35′45″N 46°33′15″E
- Country: Iran
- Province: Kermanshah
- County: Ravansar
- Bakhsh: Central
- Rural District: Zalu Ab

Population (2006)
  - Total: 236
- Time zone: UTC+3:30 (IRST)
  - Summer (DST): UTC+4:30 (IRDT)

Nowruleh-ye Olya (Persian: نوروله عليا, also Romanized as Nowrūleh-ye ‘Olyā) is a village in Zalu Ab Rural District, in the Central District of Ravansar County, Kermanshah Province, Iran. At the 2006 census, its population was 236, in 41 families.
