= Belehzin-e Olya =

Belehzin-e Olya بله زين عليا
- Village
- Location within Iran
- Coordinates: 34°44′45″N 46°41′20″E
- Country: Iran
- Province: Kermanshah
- County: Ravansar
- Bakhsh: Central
- Rural District: Badr

Population (2006)
  - Total: 23
- Time zone: UTC+3:30 (IRST)
  - Summer (DST): UTC+4:30 (IRDT)

Belehzin-e Olya (Persian: بله زين عليا, also Romanized as Belehzīn-e ‘Olyā; also known as Bālāzīn-ye Bālā and Belezīn-e ‘Olyā) is a village in Badr Rural District, in the Central District of Ravansar County, Kermanshah Province, Iran. At the 2006 census, its population was 23, in 6 families.
