= Belehzin =

Belehzin (Persian: بله زين), also rendered as Balazin and Belezin, may refer to:

- Belehzin-e Olya
- Belehzin-e Sofla
