= Mamenan-e Olya =

Mamenan-e Olya مامنان عليا
- Village
- Location within Iran
- Coordinates: 34°43′57″N 46°29′35″E
- Country: Iran
- Province: Kermanshah
- County: Ravansar
- Bakhsh: Central
- Rural District: Dowlatabad

Population (2006)
  - Total: 159
- Time zone: UTC+3:30 (IRST)
  - Summer (DST): UTC+4:30 (IRDT)

Mamenan-e Olya (Persian: مامنان عليا, also Romanized as Māmenān-e ‘Olyā; also known as Māmenān-e Bālā) is a village in Dowlatabad Rural District, in the Central District of Ravansar County, Kermanshah Province, Iran. As of the 2006 census, its population was 159, in 33 families.
