= Shayengan =

Shayengan شاينگان
- Village
- Location within Iran
- Coordinates: 34°41′08″N 46°25′58″E
- Country: Iran
- Province: Kermanshah
- County: Ravansar
- Bakhsh: Central
- Rural District: Dowlatabad

Population (2006)
  - Total: 167
- Time zone: UTC+3:30 (IRST)
  - Summer (DST): UTC+4:30 (IRDT)

Shayengan (Persian: شاينگان, also Romanized as Shāyengān; also known as Shānīgān, Shāyegān, and Shingan) is a village in Dowlatabad Rural District, in the Central District of Ravansar County, Kermanshah Province, Iran. At the 2006 census, its population was 167, in 38 families.
