= Piruzeh =

Piruzeh پيروزه
- Village
- Location within Iran
- Coordinates: 34°34′44″N 46°34′53″E
- Country: Iran
- Province: Kermanshah
- County: Ravansar
- Bakhsh: Central
- Rural District: Zalu Ab

Population (2006)
  - Total: 44
- Time zone: UTC+3:30 (IRST)
  - Summer (DST): UTC+4:30 (IRDT)

Piruzeh (Persian: پيروزه, also Romanized as Pīrūzeh; also known as Fīrūzeh) is a village in Zalu Ab Rural District, in the Central District of Ravansar County, Kermanshah Province, Iran. At the 2006 census, its population was 44, in 10 families.
