= Kalaveh, Ravansar =

Kalaveh كلاوه
- Village
- Location within Iran
- Coordinates: 34°46′51″N 46°41′28″E
- Country: Iran
- Province: Kermanshah
- County: Ravansar
- Bakhsh: Central
- Rural District: Badr

Population (2006)
  - Total: 101
- Time zone: UTC+3:30 (IRST)
  - Summer (DST): UTC+4:30 (IRDT)

Kalaveh (Persian: كلاوه, also Romanized as Kalāveh) is a village in Badr Rural District, in the Central District of Ravansar County, Kermanshah Province, Iran. At the 2006 census, its population was 101, in 22 families.
