= Chalani =

Chalani may refer to:

- Chalani, Dahanu, a village in India
- Chalaneh-ye Olya, a village in Iran
