= Elyasi, Kermanshah =

Elyasi الياسي
- Village
- Location within Iran
- Coordinates: 34°34′22″N 46°38′10″E
- Country: Iran
- Province: Kermanshah
- County: Ravansar
- Bakhsh: Central
- Rural District: Zalu Ab

Population (2006)
  - Total: 60
- Time zone: UTC+3:30 (IRST)
  - Summer (DST): UTC+4:30 (IRDT)

Elyasi (Persian: الياسي, also Romanized as Elyāsī) is a village in Zalu Ab Rural District, in the Central District of Ravansar County, Kermanshah Province, Iran. At the 2006 census, its population was 60, in 13 families.
