= Mamenan-e Sofla =

Mamenan-e Sofla مامنان سفلي
- Village
- Location within Iran
- Coordinates: 34°43′52″N 46°30′32″E
- Country: Iran
- Province: Kermanshah
- County: Ravansar
- Bakhsh: Central
- Rural District: Dowlatabad

Population (2006)
  - Total: 166
- Time zone: UTC+3:30 (IRST)
  - Summer (DST): UTC+4:30 (IRDT)

Mamenan-e Sofla (Persian: مامنان سفلي, also Romanized as Māmenān-e Soflá) is a village in Dowlatabad Rural District, in the Central District of Ravansar County, Kermanshah Province, Iran. At the 2006 census, its population was 166, in 34 families.
