= Kalaveh-ye Heydar Khan =

Kalaveh-ye Heydar Khan كلاوه حيدر خان
- Village
- Location within Iran
- Coordinates: 34°38′55″N 46°35′30″E
- Country: Iran
- Province: Kermanshah
- County: Ravansar
- Bakhsh: Central
- Rural District: Zalu Ab

Population (2006)
  - Total: 179
- Time zone: UTC+3:30 (IRST)
  - Summer (DST): UTC+4:30 (IRDT)

Kalaveh-ye Heydar Khan (Persian: كلاوه حيدر خان, also Romanized as Kalāveh-ye Ḩeydar Khān; also known as Kalāveh-ye ‘Azīzkhān) is a village in Zalu Ab Rural District, in the Central District of Ravansar County, Kermanshah Province, Iran. At the 2006 census, its population was 179, in 34 families.
