= Tappeh Lori, Ravansar =

Tappeh Lori تپه لري
- Village
- Location within Iran
- Coordinates: 34°34′20″N 46°44′04″E
- Country: Iran
- Province: Kermanshah
- County: Ravansar
- Bakhsh: Central
- Rural District: Hasanabad

Population (2006)
  - Total: 272
- Time zone: UTC+3:30 (IRST)
  - Summer (DST): UTC+4:30 (IRDT)

Tappeh Lori (Persian: تپه لري, also Romanized as Tappeh Lorī) is a village in Hasanabad Rural District, in the Central District of Ravansar County, Kermanshah Province, Iran. At the 2006 census, its population was 272, in 57 families.
