= Kareh-ye Qaleh Sefid =

Kareh-ye Qaleh Sefid كره قلعه سفيد
- Village
- Location within Iran
- Coordinates: 34°39′00″N 46°33′00″E
- Country: Iran
- Province: Kermanshah
- County: Ravansar
- Bakhsh: Central
- Rural District: Dowlatabad

Population (2006)
  - Total: 142
- Time zone: UTC+3:30 (IRST)
  - Summer (DST): UTC+4:30 (IRDT)

Kareh-ye Qaleh Sefid (Persian: كره قلعه سفيد, also Romanized as Kareh-ye Qal‘eh Sefīd and Kareh Qal‘eh Safīd; also known as Kaleh Kareh, Karah-e Qal‘eh, Kareh Qal‘eh, Qal‘eh Sefīd, and Qal‘eh-ye Sefīd Kareh) is a village in Dowlatabad Rural District, in the Central District of Ravansar County, Kermanshah Province, Iran. At the 2006 census, its population was 142, in 25 families.
