= Quri Qaleh =

Village in Kermanshah province, Iran

Quri Qaleh Persian: قوری ‌قلعه
- Village
- Location within Iran
- Coordinates: 34°53′30″N 46°29′50″E
- Country: Iran
- Province: Kermanshah
- County: Ravansar
- District: Shahu
- Rural District: Quri Qaleh

Population (2016)
  - Total: 891
- Time zone: UTC+3:30 (IRST)

Quri Qaleh (Persian: قوري قلعه) (Note: Also known as Qura Qala; Kurdish: قوڕەقەڵا) is a village in, and the capital of, Quri Qaleh Rural District of Shahu District, Ravansar County, Kermanshah province, Iran.

== Demographics ==
=== Population ===
At the time of the 2006 National Census, the village's population was 989 in 211 households. The following census in 2011 counted 1,006 people in 249 households. The 2016 census measured the population of the village as 891 people in 254 households. It was the most populous village in its rural district.
