= Hasanabad, Ravansar =

Village in Kermanshah province, Iran

Hasanabad Persian: حسن اباد
- Village
- Location within Iran
- Coordinates: 34°37′43″N 46°42′03″E
- Country: Iran
- Province: Kermanshah
- County: Ravansar
- District: Central
- Rural District: Hasanabad

Population (2016)
  - Total: 924
- Time zone: UTC+3:30 (IRST)

Hasanabad (Persian: حسن اباد) (Note: Also romanized as Ḩasanābād) is a village in, and the capital of, Hasanabad Rural District of the Central District of Ravansar County, Kermanshah province, Iran.

== Demographics ==
=== Population ===
At the time of the 2006 National Census, the village's population was 841 in 209 households. The following census in 2011 counted 955 people in 160 households. The 2016 census measured the population of the village as 924 people in 257 households. It was the most populous village in its rural district.
