= Lachin, Kermanshah =

Lachin لاچين
- Village
- Location within Iran
- Coordinates: 34°33′59″N 46°42′12″E
- Country: Iran
- Province: Kermanshah
- County: Ravansar
- Bakhsh: Central
- Rural District: Zalu Ab

Population (2006)
  - Total: 33
- Time zone: UTC+3:30 (IRST)
  - Summer (DST): UTC+4:30 (IRDT)

Lachin (Persian: لاچين, also Romanized as Lāchīn) is a village in Zalu Ab Rural District, in the Central District of Ravansar County, Kermanshah Province, Iran. At the 2006 census, its population was 33, in 7 families.
