= Tappeh Lari =

Tappeh Lari or Tappeh Lori (Persian: تپه لري) may refer to:

- Tappeh Lari, Kermanshah
- Tappeh Lori, Ravansar, Kermanshah Province
