= Borhan ol Din =

Village in Kermanshah province, Iran

Borhan ol Din Persian: برهان الدين
- Village
- Location within Iran
- Coordinates: 34°44′00″N 46°37′53″E
- Country: Iran
- Province: Kermanshah
- County: Ravansar
- District: Central
- Rural District: Badr

Population (2016)
  - Total: 193
- Time zone: UTC+3:30 (IRST)

Borhan ol Din (Persian: برهان الدين) (Note: Also romanized as Borhān ol Dīn; also known as Borhān od Dīn) is a village in, and the capital of, Badr Rural District of the Central District of Ravansar County, Kermanshah province, Iran.

== Demographics ==
=== Population ===
At the time of the 2006 National Census, the village's population was 249 in 53 households. The following census in 2011 counted 236 people in 64 households. The 2016 census measured the population of the village as 193 people in 63 households.
