= Kharajian =

Village in Kermanshah province, Iran

Kharajian Persian: خراجيان
- Village
- Location within Iran
- Coordinates: 34°47′10″N 46°40′16″E
- Country: Iran
- Province: Kermanshah
- County: Ravansar
- District: Central
- Rural District: Badr

Population (2016)
  - Total: 564
- Time zone: UTC+3:30 (IRST)

Kharajian (Persian: خراجيان) (Note: Also romanized as Kharājeyān, Kharājīān, and Kharājīyān; also known as Karajīān) is a village in Badr Rural District of the Central District of Ravansar County, Kermanshah province, Iran.

== Demographics ==
=== Population ===
At the time of the 2006 National Census, the village's population was 621 in 122 households. The following census in 2011 counted 680 people in 164 households. The 2016 census measured the population of the village as 564 people in 147 households. It was the most populous village in its rural district.
