= Jan Jan, Iran =

Jan Jan or Janjan (Persian: جانجان) in Iran may refer to:

- Jan Jan, Ilam
- Jan Jan, Kermanshah
- Janjan, alternate name of Deh-e Janjan, Kermanshah Province
