= Nowruleh-ye Sofla =

Nowruleh-ye Sofla نوروله سفلي
- Village
- Location within Iran
- Coordinates: 34°35′09″N 46°33′58″E
- Country: Iran
- Province: Kermanshah
- County: Ravansar
- Bakhsh: Central
- Rural District: Zalu Ab

Population (2006)
  - Total: 52
- Time zone: UTC+3:30 (IRST)
  - Summer (DST): UTC+4:30 (IRDT)

Nowruleh-ye Sofla (Persian: نوروله سفلي, also Romanized as Nowrūleh-ye Soflá) is a village in Zalu Ab Rural District, in the Central District of Ravansar County, Kermanshah Province, Iran. At the 2006 census, its population was 52, in 14 families.
