= Khuriabad, Kermanshah =

Khuriabad خوري اباد
- Village
- Location within Iran
- Coordinates: 34°51′40″N 46°30′48″E
- Country: Iran
- Province: Kermanshah
- County: Ravansar
- Bakhsh: Shahu
- Rural District: Quri Qaleh

Population (2006)
  - Total: 98
- Time zone: UTC+3:30 (IRST)
  - Summer (DST): UTC+4:30 (IRDT)

Khuriabad (Persian: خوري اباد, also Romanized as Khūrīābād and Khvorīābād) is a village in Quri Qaleh Rural District, Shahu District, Ravansar County, Kermanshah Province, Iran. At the 2006 census, its population was 98, in 18 families.
