= Shesh Bid-e Sofla =

Shesh Bid-e Sofla شش بيدسفلي
- Village
- Location within Iran
- Coordinates: 34°41′46″N 46°28′59″E
- Country: Iran
- Province: Kermanshah
- County: Ravansar
- Bakhsh: Central
- Rural District: Dowlatabad

Population (2006)
  - Total: 75
- Time zone: UTC+3:30 (IRST)
  - Summer (DST): UTC+4:30 (IRDT)

Shesh Bid-e Sofla (Persian: شش بيدسفلي, also Romanized as Shesh Bīd-e Soflá) is a village in Dowlatabad Rural District, in the Central District of Ravansar County, Kermanshah Province, Iran. At the 2006 census, its population was 75, in 15 families.
