= Shesh Bid =

Shesh Bid (Persian: شش بيد) may refer to:

- Shesh Bid-e Olya
- Shesh Bid-e Sofla
