= Chalaneh-ye Olya =

Chalaneh-ye Olya چلانه عليا
- Village
- Location within Iran
- Coordinates: 34°56′31″N 46°24′25″E
- Country: Iran
- Province: Kermanshah
- County: Ravansar
- Bakhsh: Shahu
- Rural District: Mansur-e Aqai

Population (2006)
  - Total: 184
- Time zone: UTC+3:30 (IRST)
  - Summer (DST): UTC+4:30 (IRDT)

Chalaneh-ye Olya (Persian: چلانه عليا, also Romanized as Chalāneh-ye ‘Olyā; also known as Chalānī-ye ‘Olyā and Chīlāneh-ye Bālā) is a village in Mansur-e Aqai Rural District, Shahu District, Ravansar County, Kermanshah Province, Iran. At the 2006 census, its population was 184, in 39 families.
