= Zalu Ab, Kermanshah =

Village in Kermanshah province, Iran

Zalu Ab Persian: زالواب
- Village
- Location within Iran
- Coordinates: 34°37′48″N 46°34′47″E
- Country: Iran
- Province: Kermanshah
- County: Ravansar
- District: Central
- Rural District: Zalu Ab

Population (2016)
  - Total: 659
- Time zone: UTC+3:30 (IRST)

Zalu Ab (Persian: زالواب) (Note: Also romanized as Zālū Āb and Zālūāb) is a village in, and the capital of, Zalu Ab Rural District of the Central District of Ravansar County, Kermanshah province, Iran.

== Demographics ==
=== Population ===
At the time of the 2006 National Census, the village's population was 681 in 166 households. The following census in 2011 counted 715 people in 186 households. The 2016 census measured the population of the village as 659 people in 202 households. It was the most populous village in its rural district.
