= Belehzin-e Sofla =

Belehzin-e Sofla بله زين سفلي
- Village
- Location within Iran
- Coordinates: 34°44′11″N 46°41′24″E
- Country: Iran
- Province: Kermanshah
- County: Ravansar
- Bakhsh: Central
- Rural District: Badr

Population (2006)
  - Total: 35
- Time zone: UTC+3:30 (IRST)
  - Summer (DST): UTC+4:30 (IRDT)

Belehzin-e Sofla (Persian: بله زين سفلي, also Romanized as Belehzīn-e Soflá and Belezīn-e Soflá) is a village in Badr Rural District, in the Central District of Ravansar County, Kermanshah Province, Iran. At the 2006 census, its population was 35, in 8 families.
