= Firuzeh, Kermanshah =

Firuzeh فيروزه
- Village
- Location within Iran
- Coordinates: 34°43′56″N 46°31′51″E
- Country: Iran
- Province: Kermanshah
- County: Ravansar
- Bakhsh: Central
- Rural District: Dowlatabad

Population (2006)
  - Total: 284
- Time zone: UTC+3:30 (IRST)
  - Summer (DST): UTC+4:30 (IRDT)

Firuzeh (Persian: فيروزه, also Romanized as Fīrūzeh) is a village in Dowlatabad Rural District, in the Central District of Ravansar County, Kermanshah Province, Iran. At the 2006 census, its population was 284, in 60 families.
