= Dowlatabad, Ravansar =

Village in Kermanshah province, Iran

Dowlatabad Persian: دولتاباد
- Village
- Location within Iran
- Coordinates: 34°41′23″N 46°32′53″E
- Country: Iran
- Province: Kermanshah
- County: Ravansar
- District: Central
- Rural District: Dowlatabad

Population (2016)
  - Total: 326
- Time zone: UTC+3:30 (IRST)

Dowlatabad (Persian: دولتاباد) (Note: Also romanized as Dowlatābād and Daūlatābād) is a village in, and the capital of, Dowlatabad Rural District of the Central District of Ravansar County, Kermanshah province, Iran.

== Demographics ==
=== Population ===
At the time of the 2006 National Census, the village's population was 398 in 104 households. The following census in 2011 counted 353 people in 105 households. The 2016 census measured the population of the village as 326 people in 103 households. It was the most populous village in its rural district.
