= Mamenan =

Mamenan (Persian: مامنان) may refer to:

- Mamenan-e Olya
- Mamenan-e Sofla
