= Shabankareh, Kermanshah =

Shabankareh شبان كاره
- Village
- Location within Iran
- Coordinates: 34°52′56″N 46°30′13″E
- Country: Iran
- Province: Kermanshah
- County: Ravansar
- Bakhsh: Shahu
- Rural District: Quri Qaleh

Population (2006)
  - Total: 394
- Time zone: UTC+3:30 (IRST)
  - Summer (DST): UTC+4:30 (IRDT)

Shabankareh (Persian: شبان كاره, also Romanized as Shabānkāreh) is a village in Quri Qaleh Rural District, Shahu District, Ravansar County, Kermanshah Province, Iran. At the 2006 census, its population was 394, in 81 families.
