= Nowruleh =

Nowruleh (Persian: نوروله) may refer to:

- Nowruleh-ye Olya
- Nowruleh-ye Sofla
