= Jan Jan, Kermanshah =

Jan Jan جانجان
- Village
- Location within Iran
- Coordinates: 34°33′14″N 46°47′06″E
- Country: Iran
- Province: Kermanshah
- County: Ravansar
- Bakhsh: Central
- Rural District: Hasanabad

Population (2006)
  - Total: 101
- Time zone: UTC+3:30 (IRST)
  - Summer (DST): UTC+4:30 (IRDT)

Jan Jan (Persian: جانجان, also Romanized as Jān Jān and Jānjān) is a village in Hasanabad Rural District, in the Central District of Ravansar County, Kermanshah Province, Iran. At the 2006 census, its population was 101, living in 23 families.
