= Kazazian =

Kazazian, alternative spelling Kazazyan is an Armenian surname. It may refer to:

- Hagop Kazazian Pasha (1833–1891), high-ranking Ottoman official of Armenian origin who served as the Minister of Finance and the Minister of the Privy Treasury during the reign of Sultan Abdulhamid II
- Haig H. Kazazian Jr. (1937-2022), American professor
- Gaik Kazazian (born 1982) is an Armenian violinist
- Georges Kazazian (born 1953), Egyptian-Armenian composer and oud player

== See also ==
- Kazaz, Iran
- Kazazi, Iran
