= Shaft and chamber tomb =

Type of burial structure

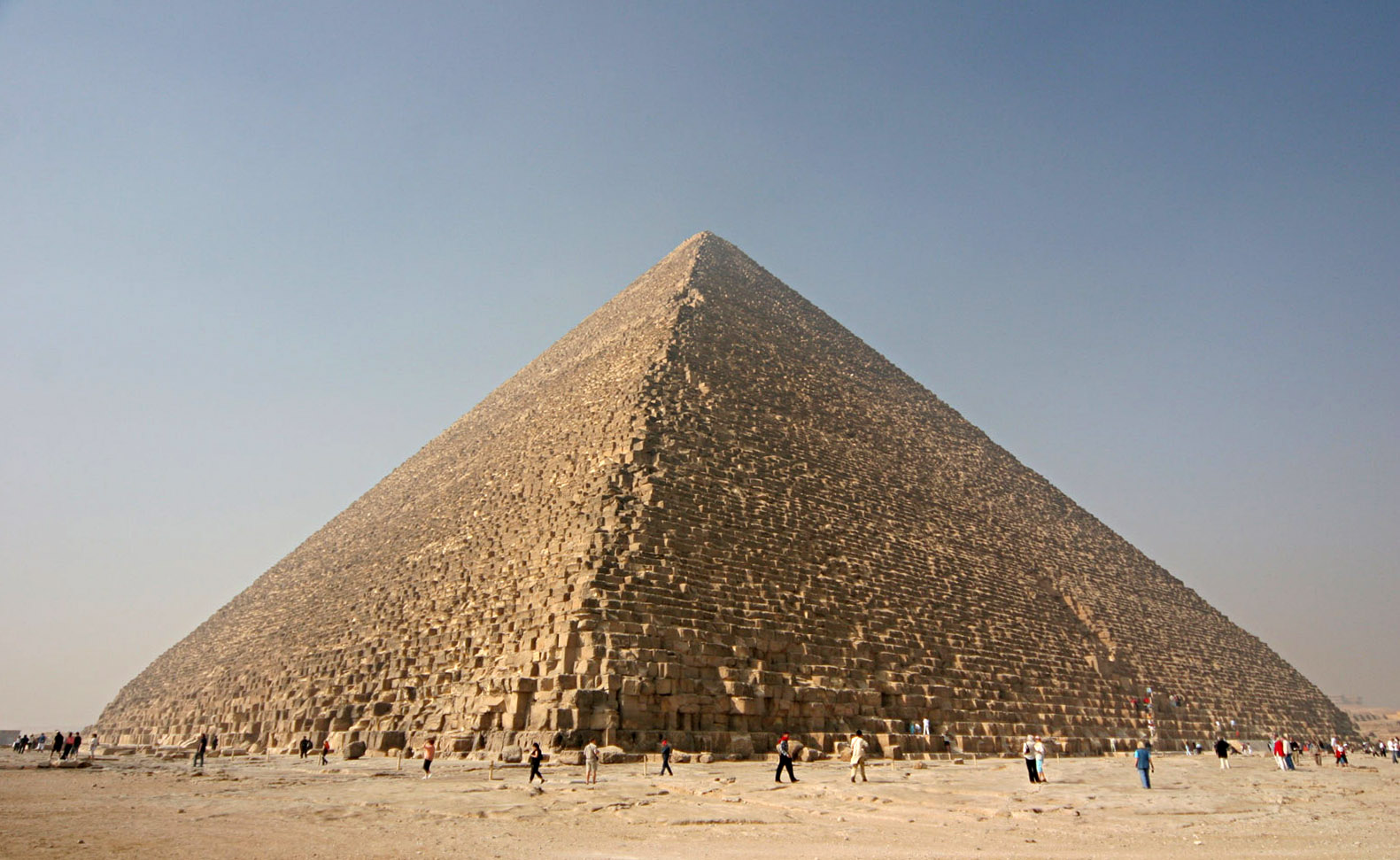
The iconic Great Pyramid of Giza is one of the best-known examples of a shaft and chamber tomb

Cross-section diagram of the ancient Egyptian shaft and chamber tomb inside the Great Pyramid of Giza

A shaft and chamber tomb is a type of chamber tomb used by some ancient peoples for burial of the dead. They consist of a shaft dug into the outcrops of rock with a square or round chamber excavated at the bottom where the dead were placed. These chambers can consist of a single shaft and chamber like the Mexican tombs or sometimes quite elaborate as was built in ancient Egypt.

Shaft and chamber tombs are found at Xemxija in Malta which are Neolithic and Dayeh-va-dokhtar tombs in Fars province of Iran. They were also employed by the ancient Egyptians. The late pre-Classic and early Classic Era cultures of west Mexico (what are now the states of Colima, Nayarit, and Jalisco) used tombs of this kind and much of what little is known about these cultures is known from art objects found in these tombs. As a result, these early West Mexico cultures are sometimes referred to as the West Mexico shaft tomb culture.

== Early Egyptian shaft and chamber tombs ==
The first shaft and chamber tomb known to have been used by the ancient Egyptians is the mastaba tomb.

== Western Mexico ==
The West Mexico Tombs are known as the "Shaft and Chamber culture". The Aztecs and Toltecs are part of this area. The Maya culture is south of Western Mexico.

The Tombs of Western Mexico and Central America have similar tombs and in part of Ecuador and Columbia these practices were used until the 20th century. The tombs were known for having funerary goods. looting of these tombs was not uncommon. Mexican artists took an interest in collecting these looted ceramics from these tombs and their traditions. Artists such as Frida Kahlo and Diego Rivera. Deep-shaft-and-chamber tombs are found in western Mexico and northwestern South America. These two areas have been discovered to have been similarly designed, in regards to, the ideology, religion, form, and geographical significance. The tombs were not just a way of communicating for the living and the dead, but also, they were, grounds to store supernatural properties. Items such as conch shells and shamanistic attributes (a horn being, associated with supernatural powers) were also stored in the tombs. Shamanistic art has been identified in the Western Mexico tombs, according to the ethnohistorical accounts. Spanish writers, referred to the shamans as sorcerers. The Peruvian data claimed that the shamans were buried alongside shamanistic rites when they died. The conch shells were also manifestations of shamanistic ideals as well as practices. Evidence is provided of this as these shells were painted on the Moche V stirrup spout vessels that originated from Peru. One of the Huaca shrines, shaft tombs had a wall in the shape of a conch shell.

The Jalisco and Nayarit cultures are incorporated with the Western Mexico culture Colima. The Colima culture has had an agrarian reputation. Most shaft tombs as well as the Colima culture have stored religious art in their tombs. Figurines of animals and people are stored in the shaft tombs of Colima. These figurines are known as Colima flats.

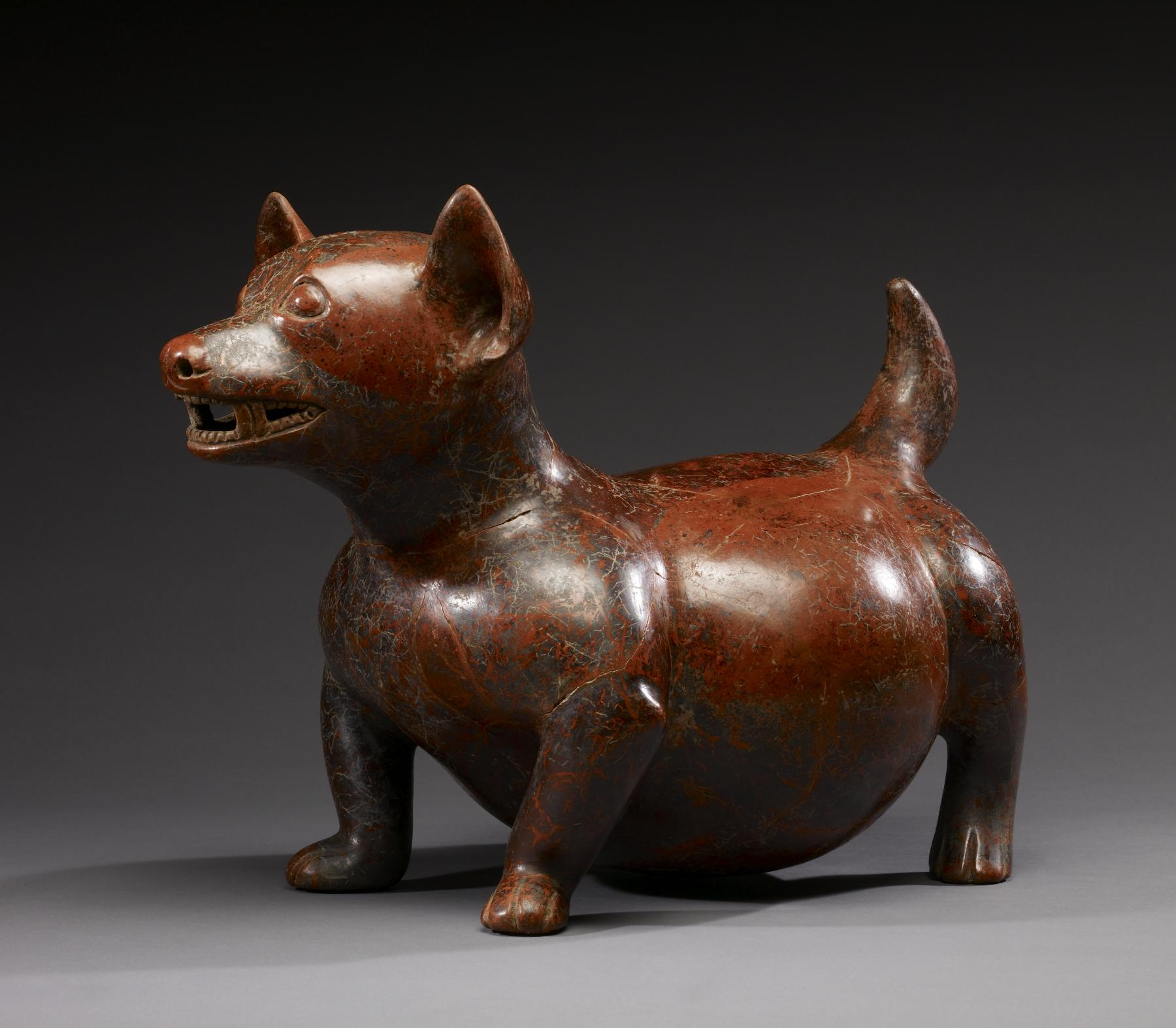
Among the Mexica (Aztecs) of highland Mexico, dogs were associated with the deity Xolotl, the god of death.

During the construction of the Tequila Valleys of Central Jalisco, labor-intensive construction was at hand. Known as the Core of the "shaft tomb" tradition due to the wealth of the tomb, the labor involved in building the tomb, and the social distinctions key role within these cultures' identities. Ceramic Data is an essential component to the Tequila Valley tomb.

== Central American and Mesoamerican tombs ==
Research into New World shaft tombs and the Western Mexico and Central American tombs has been difficult due to looting. Shaft tombs did not prosper in Mesoamerica, as they did in northwestern South America, which has led to Joseph B. Mountjoy and Mary K. Sandford suggesting that northwestern South America could be the origin of these tombs.

Shaft tombs appeared in Western Mexico during the Mesoamerican period (1500 BCE – 200 CE) and also during the Pre classic period (300 BCE – 150 CE). Shaft tombs vary from 10 to 65 feet deep and built under structures. A reason why they are called shaft tombs is because they use shaft stones to mark the location of the tomb. The labor required to build these tombs indicate that higher social classes were buried in them. In 1993 the first un-looted tomb was discovered at Huitzilapa in Jalisco. Shaft tombs were normally found in three Western Mexican states: Jalisco, Nayarit, and Colima.

In Jalisco the tombs found have figurines that are made from clay, have elongated faces and high foreheads. At Nayarit there are sculptures that have painted details and wildly separate eyes. These figures are called Chinnesco because their widely separate eyes give them a Chinese like appearance. Tombs at Colima have hallow figures of animals, humans and plants which are made from warm brown slip (watery clay molded by hand). Other figurines that are also found at this site are ceramic dogs. Ceramic dogs are hairless dogs and are very important to their culture as they have multiple roles in the underworld. These include being the watch dog to the dead, healers, and a source of food. Shaft tombs also contain other offerings such as pottery containing food, beads, crystals, jade and conch shells.

The Sipan tomb has been deemed Lord of Sipan, enclosed with eight other individuals, presumably wives and servants of Sipan. The paintings in the looted tombs of the Moche are essential because they did not have a written language. The pottery scenes and the wall drawings depict how sacrifice was a core component to the Moche and their beliefs. Sacrifice was essential for the Moche so they could offer their warrior-priest blood in a goblet to appease him. There were two Sipan tombs that were unlooted. In both tombs, there was a moche elite as well as a warrior. It was confirmed by archaeologists that the warriors had no feet. It is assumed that there were ritual amputations performed to make sure that the warriors could not abandon their post in the afterlife.

The Tomb of the Triclinium celebrated the deceased because they were embracing the afterlife. This tomb is an Etruscan chamber tomb. It is located in Italy.

== See also ==
- Essaqwand Rock Tombs
- Imperial cult
- Shaft tomb
- Sorkh Deh chamber tomb
- Veneration of the dead

== Sources ==
- http://www.public.asu.edu/~mesmith9/1-CompleteSet/MES-78-ShaftTombs.pdf
