= Kazazi =

Kazazi کزازی
- Village
- Location within Iran
- Coordinates: 34°38′47″N 46°28′02″E
- Country: Iran
- Province: Kermanshah
- County: Ravansar
- Bakhsh: Central
- Rural District: Dowlatabad

Population (2006)
  - Total: 44
- Time zone: UTC+3:30 (IRST)
  - Summer (DST): UTC+4:30 (IRDT)

Kazazi (Persian: کزازی, also Romanized as Kazāzī) is a village in Dowlatabad Rural District, in the Central District of Ravansar County, Kermanshah Province, Iran. At the 2006 census, its population was 44, in 9 families.
