= Qaleh Sefid-e Olya =

Qaleh Sefid-e Olya (Persian: قلعه سفيدعليا) may refer to:

- Qaleh Sefid-e Olya, Kermanshah
- Qaleh Sefid-e Olya, Khuzestan
