= Bildad (disambiguation) =

Bildad may refer to:

== People ==
- Bildad, in the Hebrew Bible, one of three friends of Job.
- Bildad, a Quaker shipowner in Moby-Dick.

== Places ==
- Bildad a village in Iran
