= Kalavi =

Kalavi (Persian: كلاوي) may refer to:

- Kalavi, Hormozgan
- Kalavi, Kermanshah
- Kalavi, Razavi Khorasan
