= Khuriabad =

Khuriabad or Khvoriabad (Persian: خوري اباد) may refer to:

- Khuriabad, Kermanshah
- Khuriabad, Kurdistan
