= Shayegan =

Shayegan may refer to:

== Place ==
- Shayegan, Iran, a village in Kermanshah Province, Iran

== People ==
- Ali Shayegan (1903–1981), Iranian politician
- Dariush Shayegan (1935–2018), Iranian thinker
