= Ravansar =

City in Kermanshah province, Iran

Ravansar Persian: روانسر
- City
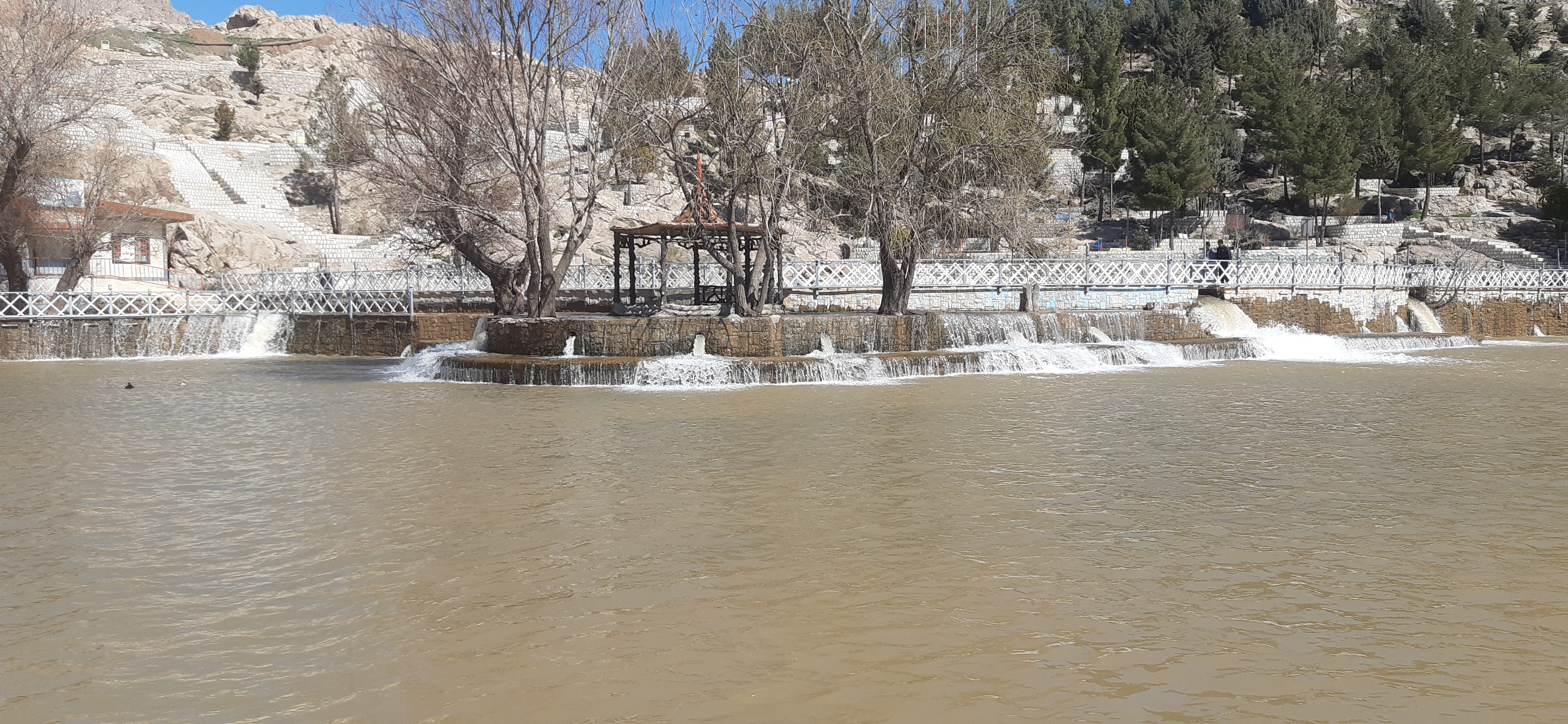
- Ravansar Lake

- Location within Iran
- Coordinates: 34°42′56″N 46°39′07″E
- Country: Iran
- Province: Kermanshah
- County: Ravansar
- District: Central

Population (2016)
  - Total: 24,527
- Time zone: UTC+3:30 (IRST)

Ravansar (Persian: روانسر) (Note: Also romanized as Ravānsar and Rawānsīr; Kurdish: ڕوانسەر) is a city in the Central District of Ravansar County, Kermanshah province, Iran, serving as the capital of both the county and the district.

== Archaeology and history ==
=== Archaeology ===
Ravansar has important prehistoric and historical sites, and in this respect, it has a special place in the archaeology of the west of Iran. The earliest evidence of human habitation around Ravansar extends back to the Middle Paleolithic that continues to the end of the glacial period (at least from about 50,000 years to 12,000 years ago), whose remains were found in the caves of the Kulian and Jawri, as well as the Garab River (Awi Kher). Another important discovery in the region is an elephant molar tooth that dates back to the Pleistocene era and has been discovered near Ravansar. Another important archaeological site is the Musaei mound and its two nearby smaller mounds, it has been inhabited since the end of the Neolithic period (about 8,000 years ago).

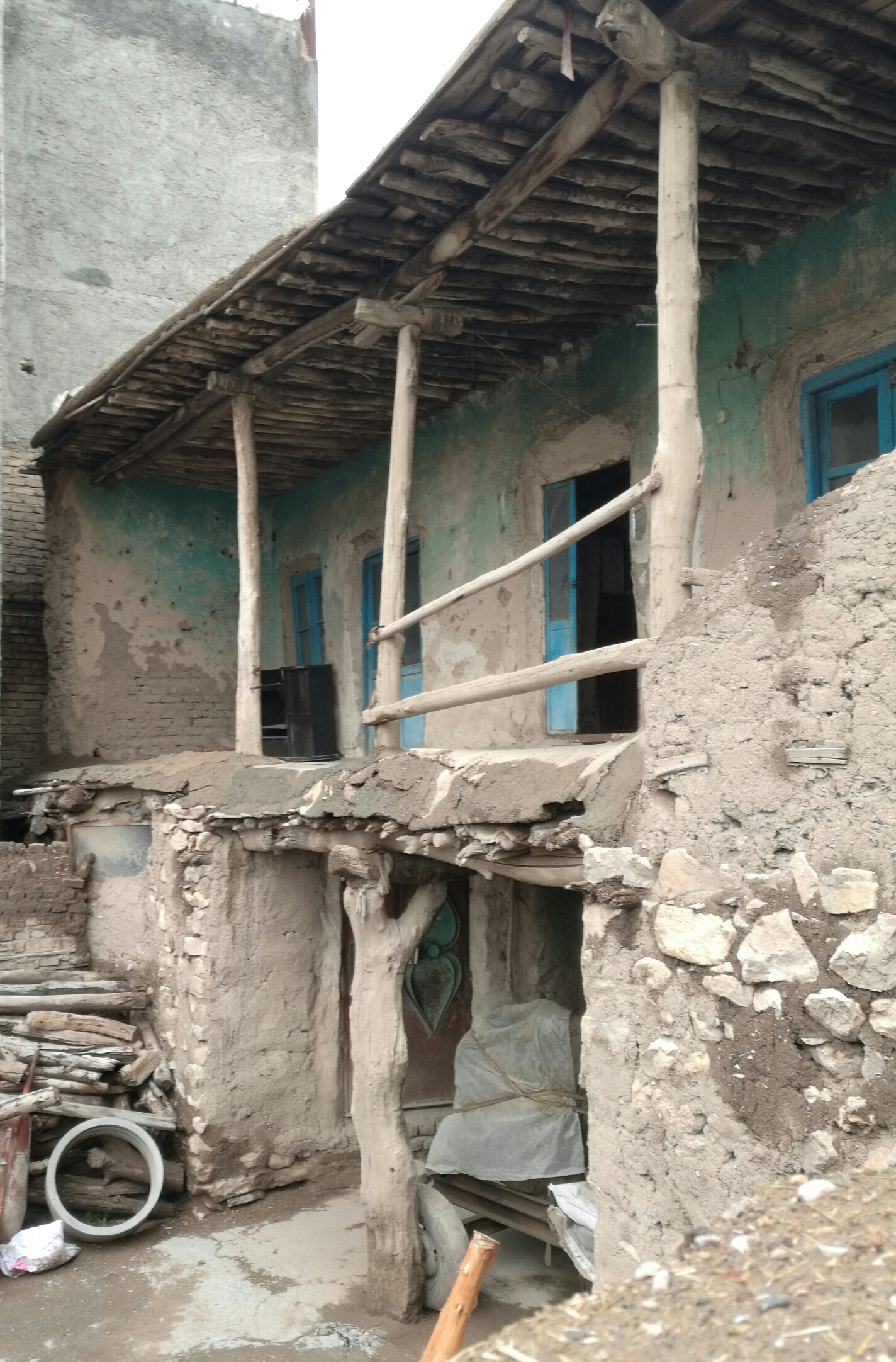
A typical Kurdish house with columned terrace at Ravansar

In the course of the Assyrian campaigns into Zagros, Ravansar was one of the bases of this Mesopotamian government that called Nikour, and it was used as a military base in which Assyrian soldiers gathered horses and other goods that were sent to Assyria. Stronach and Calmeyer proposed Ravansar as a possible candidate for the place of Bit-Istar, an Assyrian town and a local kingdom (c. 12th century BC - c. 710 BC) at western Zagros. The rock-cut tomb of Ravansar or Dekhmeh Rawansar, which local people call "Kōshk", is located in the eastern face of limestone rock in the northeast of Ravansar, which dates back to Achaemenid period. The tomb consists of a small chamber that opens to the east and overlooks the slope. The figure of Ahura Mazda, a person, and mass of firewood appears on the right side of the entrance to this tomb. There is also a pillar base next to the Goni Khani Spring, called "Takhti Zangi", which may have been created at the same time as the tomb, indicating the presence of a palace or smaller buildings near the spring. Therefore, during the Achaemenid period, Ravansar was probably one of the important centers of this government in the west of the country. In the Parthian period, Ravansar was a small town in the west of the present town which today is close to a spring called Kani Wayan (near the police station). From the Sassanid period, a collection of silverware has been discovered in Quri Qala Cave. There was also a cemetery from the Safavid period on the northern slopes of Qola Mount. The gravestones exhibit the Kofi scripts, and have been looted or broken in recent decades. This Safavid cemetery shows the importance of Ravansar in the Safavid period.

=== Main archaeological sites ===
- Musaei mounds, (from the end of the Neolithic Age - about 8,000 years ago - up to Islamic period)
- Kulian Cave and Jawri Cave (from the Middle Paleolithic Period - about 50 thousand years ago - until the end of the Epialeolithic Period - about 12 thousand years ago)
- Rock-cut tomb of "Koshk" (Achaemenid Period)
- Kani Wayan (the Parthian Period)
- Islamic Cemetery (Safavid Period and Qajar)

=== Modern history ===
Ravansar seems to have been a large village during the Safavid period. There was a cemetery from the Safavid period with tombstones with inscriptions in Kufic script on the northern slopes of Qoleh rock, which has been destroyed or looted in recent years. Ravansar was also part of the territory of Ardalan rulers during the 19th centurey. The name Ravansar was first mentioned in written sources about 400 years ago in Sharafnama, in which Ravansar is mentioned as the possessions of the Dar-Tang rulers.

Ali-Akbar Dehkhoda who was a prominent Iranian linguist and lexicographer described Ravansar in the 1960s as follows. "The central town of Ravansar is part of Sanandaj, and next to the Kermanshah-Paveh highway and the southeastern promontory of Shahu Mountain. It has a cold climate, but due to numerous springs, there are many swamps and sludges in the summer. There is a clinic in the town that is always ready to receive patients. The district offices, the finance agency, the statistics, the checkpoint, the armed customs guard, and the gendarmerie are located in the town and it has one primary school and eight shops. Its main products are grains, fruits, rice, and dairy products, and there is a daily commute between this town and Kermanshah."

== Climate ==
Climate data for Ravansar (WMO ID: 40764) (normals for 1988-2010, extremes 1988-2021)
Month	Jan	Feb	Mar	Apr	May	Jun	Jul	Aug	Sep	Oct	Nov	Dec	Year
Record high °C (°F)	17.6 (63.7)	20.6 (69.1)	27.2 (81.0)	30.4 (86.7)	35.0 (95.0)	40.2 (104.4)	41.4 (106.5)	41.8 (107.2)	40.2 (104.4)	34.6 (94.3)	28.0 (82.4)	21.0 (69.8)	41.8 (107.2)
Mean daily maximum °C (°F)	5.8 (42.4)	7.7 (45.9)	13.4 (56.1)	19.4 (66.9)	25.4 (77.7)	32.3 (90.1)	36.5 (97.7)	36.3 (97.3)	31.6 (88.9)	24.6 (76.3)	15.6 (60.1)	9.6 (49.3)	21.5 (70.7)
Daily mean °C (°F)	1.3 (34.3)	3.2 (37.8)	8.1 (46.6)	12.9 (55.2)	18.0 (64.4)	24.1 (75.4)	28.7 (83.7)	28.2 (82.8)	22.9 (73.2)	17.4 (63.3)	9.8 (49.6)	4.8 (40.6)	15.0 (58.9)
Mean daily minimum °C (°F)	−2.9 (26.8)	−2.3 (27.9)	1.7 (35.1)	6.4 (43.5)	10.2 (50.4)	15.2 (59.4)	20.9 (69.6)	19.7 (67.5)	13.9 (57.0)	9.9 (49.8)	3.9 (39.0)	0.0 (32.0)	8.1 (46.5)
Record low °C (°F)	−22.5 (−8.5)	−22.5 (−8.5)	−13.0 (8.6)	−8.6 (16.5)	−1.0 (30.2)	5.4 (41.7)	9.2 (48.6)	14.0 (57.2)	8.0 (46.4)	1.8 (35.2)	−6.2 (20.8)	−14.8 (5.4)	−22.5 (−8.5)
Average precipitation mm (inches)	85.8 (3.38)	73.0 (2.87)	97.9 (3.85)	68.6 (2.70)	25.3 (1.00)	2.3 (0.09)	0.8 (0.03)	0.0 (0.0)	0.6 (0.02)	21.4 (0.84)	64.7 (2.55)	83.8 (3.30)	524.2 (20.63)
Average precipitation days (≥ 0)	12.0	12.3	11.3	10.8	6.4	1.0	0.5	0.2	0.7	4.7	8.6	10.0	78.5
Average relative humidity (%)	68	68.5	59.3	55.5	49.8	30.9	21.9	20.3	22	31.4	53.5	63	45.3
Mean monthly sunshine hours	152.6	159.6	185.5	225.4	265.5	352.7	366.1	355.3	334.1	276.5	199.4	158.7	3,031.4
Source 1: Iran Meteorological Organization(precipitation and mean max/min temperatures 1988-2005)
Source 2: Kermanshah Meteorological Office (records, humidity, sun)

== Demographics ==
=== Population ===
At the time of the 2006 National Census, the city's population was 16,383 in 3,838 households. The following census in 2011 counted 21,250 people in 5,609 households. The 2016 census measured the population of the city as 24,527 people in 7,122 households.

== Shrines ==
There are several shrines near Ravansar as follows:

- Khawr Wa Sar: Southwest of Torkapan village, Jawanrood route, oak tree, keeper of agricultural implements during migration to winter pasture.
- Sultan Sheikh Mardar: Oak tree near Jawanrood, It was visited by patients with rheumatism, back pain, and leg pain.
- Ferishta Charmeg (White angle): near Kani Kawa (blue spring) near the telecommunication tower, on Mount Sarkawa.
- Hori Mard: an oak tree near Kani Kawa village, the foothills of Sarkawa Mountain, It was visited by patients with jaundice.

== See also ==
- Dekhmeh Rawansar
- Khanileh, Kermanshah
- Jaff tribe
- Ardalan
- Javanrud
- Paveh
