= Essaqwand Rock Tombs =

Tombs in Kermanshah province, Iran

- گوردخمه اسحاق‌وند (Persian)
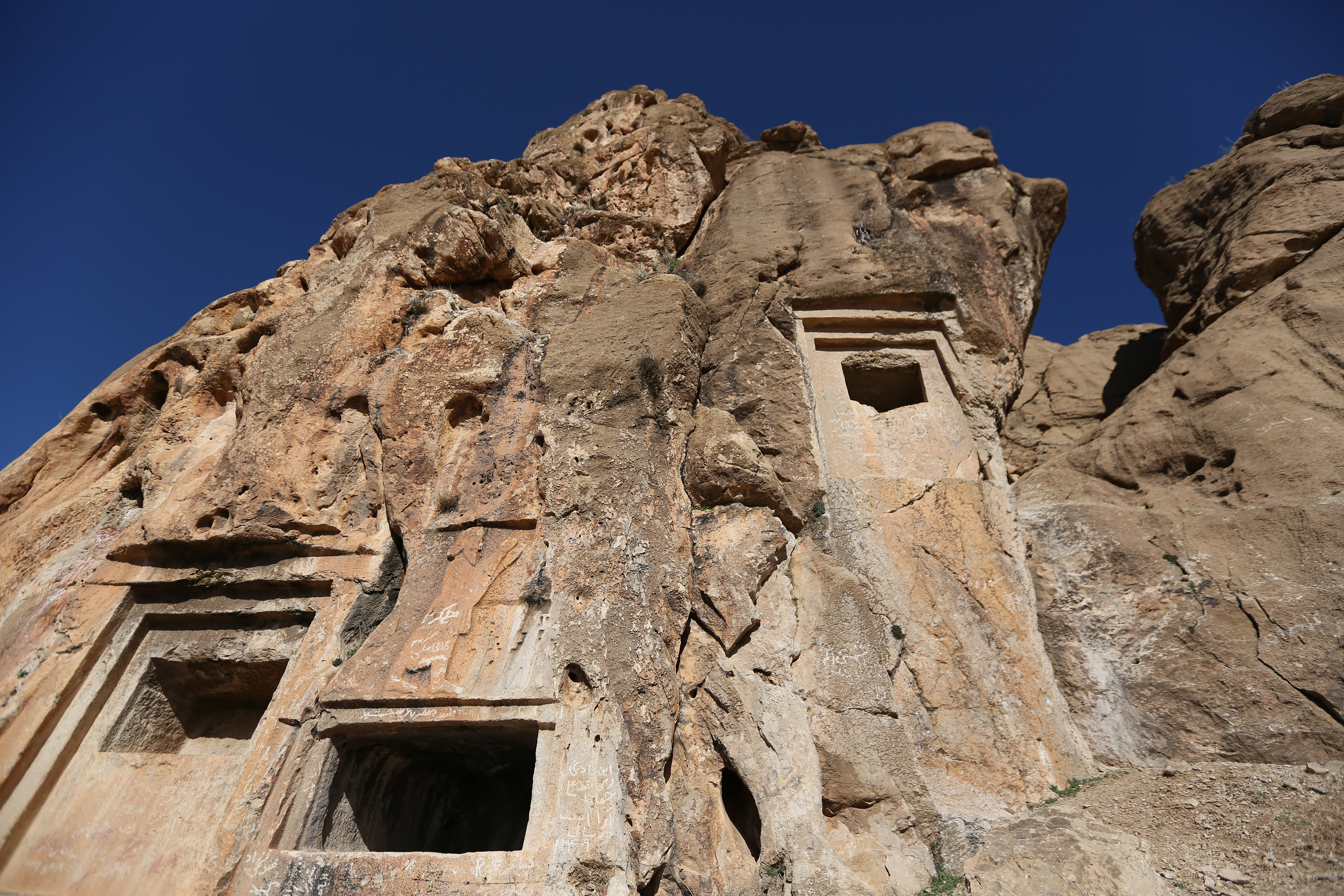
- Essaqwand Rock Tombs

- Location within Near East Location within Iran
- 34.230821°N 47.432644°E
- Type: Neolithic archaeological site
- Location: Iran
- Region: Kermanshah province

The Essaqwand Rock Tombs (Persian: گوردخمه اسحاق‌وند) are three rock-hewn tombs located 25 km southwest of Harsin in Kermanshah province, Iran. On top of the middle tomb there is a rock relief of a man with his profile toward the viewers. He is holding his hands in prayers in front of him. There is also a torch and a fire altar in front of him. Behind the fire altar there is another man, holding up something in his hands. The tombs have been attributed to different historical eras including Medes, Achaemenids, Seleucids and Parthians.

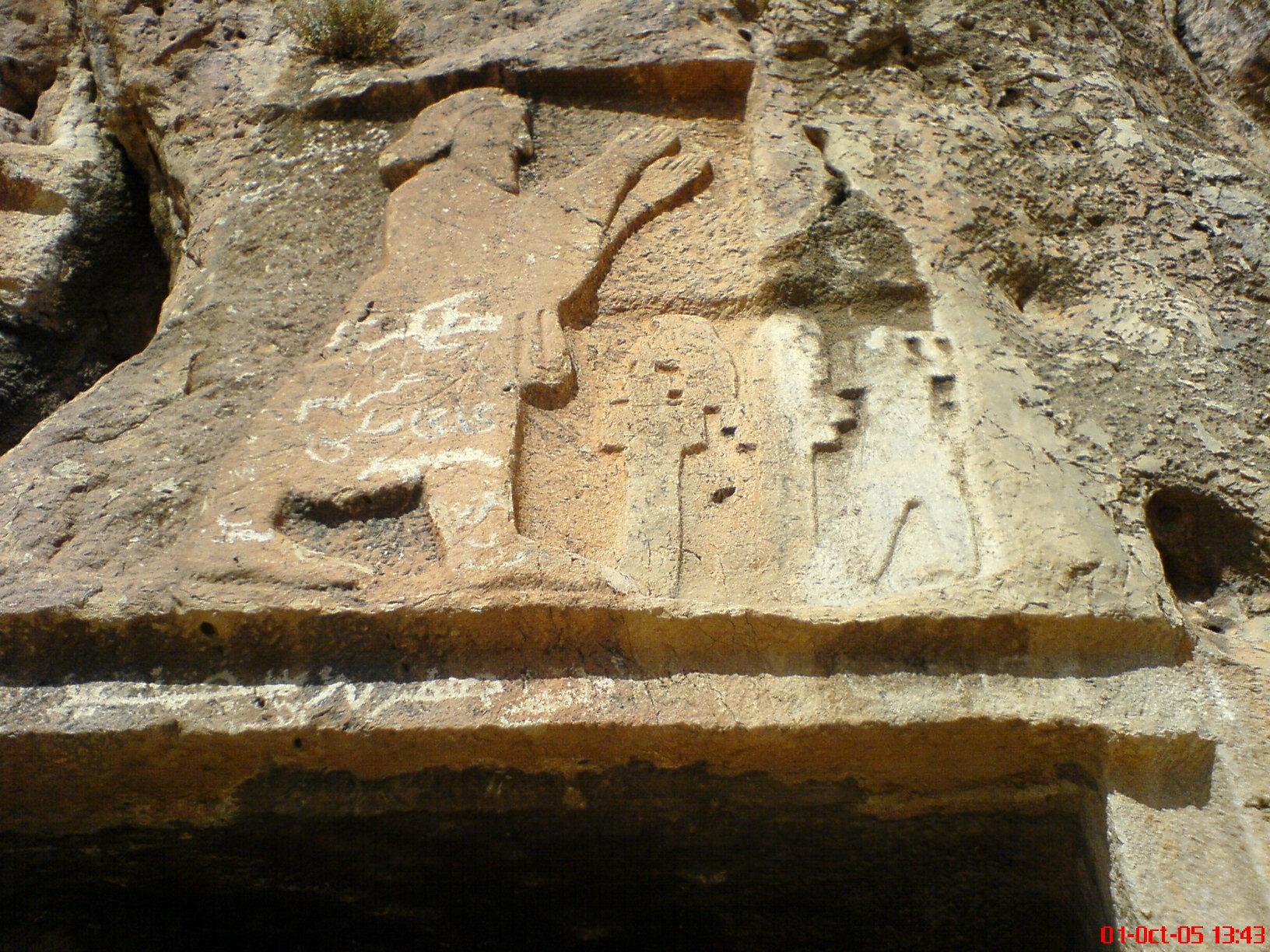
Praying Man's figure over one the tombs of Es-hagh-vand

== See also ==
- Sorkh Deh chamber tomb
- Dekhmeh Rawansar
