= Sorkh Deh chamber tomb =

Iran national heritage site in Kermanshah Province

Coordinates: 34.2675°N 47.4066°E

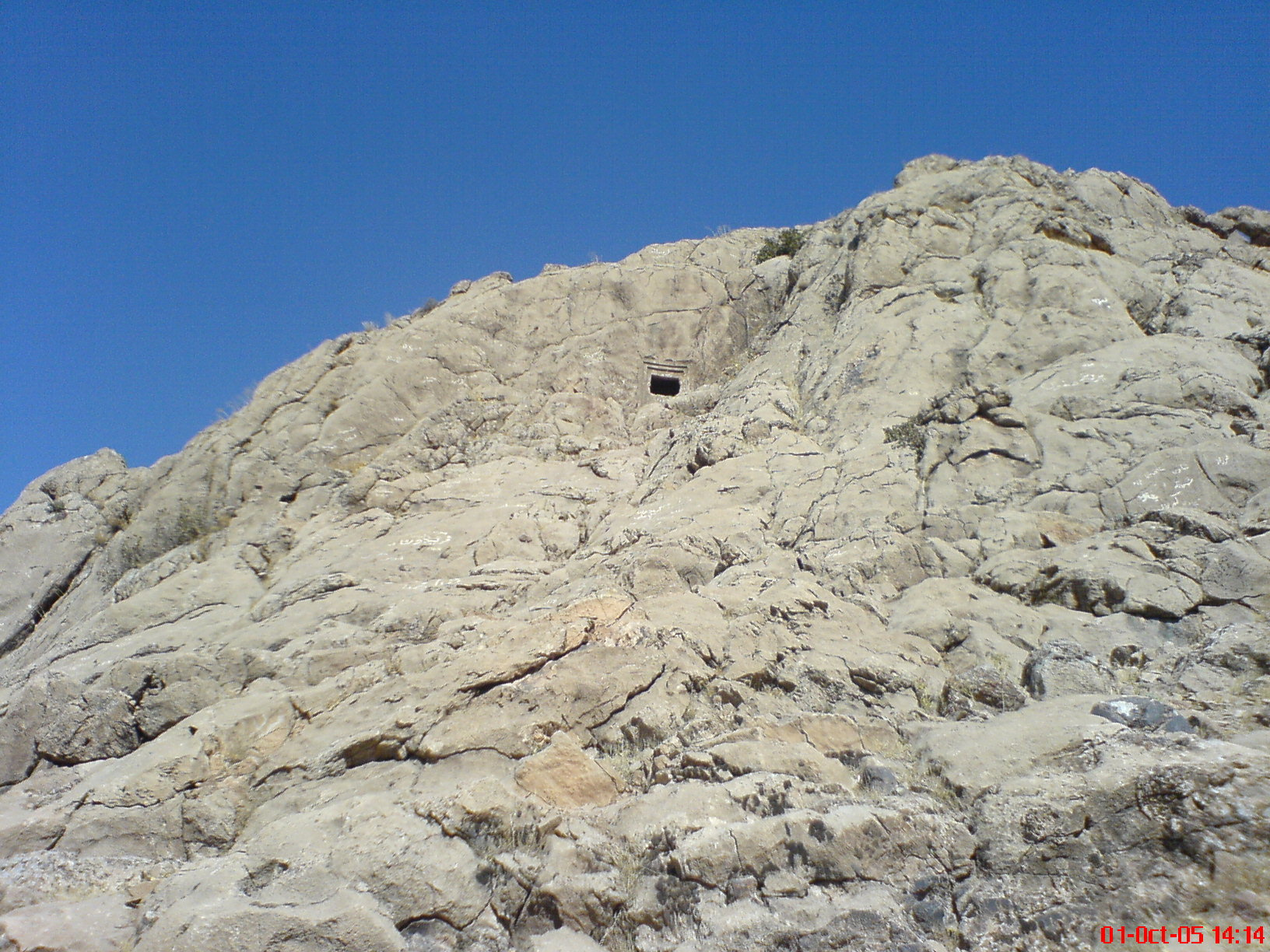
Road view of Sorkh Deh chamber tomb

Sorkh Deh chamber tomb (Persian: گوردخمه سرخ‌ده) is a Shaft and chamber tomb type grave located in Kermanshah province in Iran. Sorkh Deh in Persian means Red Village. The grave probably dates back 2500 years. Sorkh Deh chamber tomb is located 19 kilometers from another series of historically important chamber tombs of Es-hagh Vand, between Shams Abad and Sorkh Deh villages at the left bank of Gamasiab river.
