= Shahu, Iran =

City in Kermanshah province, Iran

Shahu Persian: شاهو
- City
- Location within Iran
- Coordinates: 34°56′08″N 46°27′42″E
- Country: Iran
- Province: Kermanshah
- County: Ravansar
- District: Shahu

Population (2016)
  - Total: 3,558
- Time zone: UTC+3:30 (IRST)

Shahu (Persian: شاهو) (Note: Formerly the village of Mansur-e Aqai (منصوراقايي), also romanized as Manşūr Āqā’ī and Manşūr-e Āqā’ī; also known as Manşūrābād) is a city in, and the capital of, Shahu District of Ravansar County, Kermanshah province, Iran. It also serves as the administrative center for Mansur-e Aqai Rural District. The previous capital of the rural district was the village of Qeshlaq.

== Demographics ==
=== Population ===
At the time of the 2006 National Census, the population (as the village of Mansur-e Aqai in Mansur-e Aqai Rural District) was 1,987 in 429 households. The following census in 2011 counted 3,342 people in 871 households, by which time the village had been merged with the village of Qeshlaq to form the new city of Shahu. The 2016 census measured the population of the city as 3,558 people in 1,049 households.
