= Chalani, Dahanu =

Village in Maharashtra

Chalani
- village
- Location in Maharashtra, India Chalani (India)
- Coordinates: 19.9958742°N 73.0700421°E
- Country: India
- State: Maharashtra
- District: Palghar
- Taluka: Dahanu
- Elevation: 146 m (479 ft)

Population (2011)
  - Total: 3,313
- Time zone: UTC+5:30 (IST)
- 2011 census code: 551660

Chalani is a village in the Palghar district of Maharashtra, India. It is located in the Dahanu taluka.

== Demographics ==
According to the 2011 census of India, Chalani has 552 households. The effective literacy rate (i.e. the literacy rate of population excluding children aged 6 and below) is 28.86%.

Demographics (2011 Census)
	Total	Male	Female
Population	3313	1688	1625
Children aged below 6 years	669	331	338
Scheduled caste	0	0	0
Scheduled tribe	3278	1669	1609
Literates	763	533	230
Workers (all)	1678	833	845
Main workers (total)	1670	827	843
Main workers: Cultivators	1196	594	602
Main workers: Agricultural labourers	443	214	229
Main workers: Household industry workers	0	0	0
Main workers: Other	31	19	12
Marginal workers (total)	8	6	2
Marginal workers: Cultivators	3	2	1
Marginal workers: Agricultural labourers	0	0	0
Marginal workers: Household industry workers	1	1	0
Marginal workers: Others	4	3	1
Non-workers	1635	855	780
