= Mansur-e Aqai Rural District =

Rural district in Kermanshah province, Iran

Mansur-e Aqai Rural District Persian: دهستان منصور آقايي
- Rural District
- Location within Iran
- Coordinates: 34°56′41″N 46°28′29″E
- Country: Iran
- Province: Kermanshah
- County: Ravansar
- District: Shahu
- Capital: Shahu

Population (2016)
  - Total: 1,012
- Time zone: UTC+3:30 (IRST)

Mansur-e Aqai Rural District (Persian: دهستان منصور آقايي) is in Shahu District of Ravansar County, Kermanshah province, Iran. It is administered from the city of Shahu. The previous capital of the rural district was the village of Qeshlaq, now a neighborhood of Shahu.

== Demographics ==
=== Population ===
At the time of the 2006 National Census, the rural district's population was 5,088 in 1,150 households. There were 1,192 inhabitants in 290 households at the following census of 2011. The 2016 census measured the population of the rural district as 1,012 in 279 households. The most populous of its five villages was Tazehabad-e Serias, with 685 people.
