= Elyasi-ye Ahmad =

Elyasi-ye Ahmad الياسي احمد
- Village
- Location within Iran
- Coordinates: 34°37′01″N 45°53′44″E
- Country: Iran
- Province: Kermanshah
- County: Sarpol-e Zahab
- Bakhsh: Central
- Rural District: Posht Tang

Population (2006)
  - Total: 631
- Time zone: UTC+3:30 (IRST)
  - Summer (DST): UTC+4:30 (IRDT)

Elyasi-ye Ahmad (Persian: الياسي احمد, also Romanized as Elyāsī-ye Aḩmad) is a village in Posht Tang Rural District, in the Central District of Sarpol-e Zahab County, Kermanshah Province, Iran. At the 2006 census, its population was estimated to be 631 persons in 109 families.
