= Lachin, West Azerbaijan =

Lachin لاچين
- Village
- Location within Iran
- Coordinates: 36°43′59″N 45°45′56″E
- Country: Iran
- Province: West Azerbaijan
- County: Mahabad
- Bakhsh: Central
- Rural District: Akhtachi-ye Gharbi

Population (2006)
  - Total: 83
- Time zone: UTC+3:30 (IRST)
  - Summer (DST): UTC+4:30 (IRDT)

Lachin (Persian: لاچين, also Romanized as Lāchīn) is a village in Akhtachi-ye Gharbi Rural District, in the Central District of Mahabad County, West Azerbaijan Province, Iran. At the 2006 census, its population was 83, in 12 families.

== Notable people ==
- Hemin Mukriyani (1921-1986), Kurdish poet and scholar
