= Lachine =

Lachine (French: La Chine, China) may refer to:

- Lachine, Quebec, a borough of Montreal
  - Lachine (electoral district), a federal electoral district from 1968 to 1988
- Lachine Rapids, Quebec
- Lachine Canal, Quebec
- The Fur Trade at Lachine National Historic Site
- Lachine station, train station on the Vaudreuil–Hudson line of the Réseau de transport métropolitain commuter train network
- Notre-Dame-de-Grâce—Lachine, a federal electoral district
- Lachine massacre, 1689 attack by Mohawk warriors on the French settlement of Lachine, Quebec
- HMCS Lachine, a 1941 Bangor-class minesweeper of the Royal Canadian Navy
- Lachine, Michigan
