= Firuzeh, Dargaz =

Firuzeh فيروزه
- Village
- Location within Iran
- Coordinates: 37°35′52″N 58°47′27″E
- Country: Iran
- Province: Razavi Khorasan
- County: Dargaz
- Bakhsh: Now Khandan
- Rural District: Shahrestaneh

Population (2006)
  - Total: 171
- Time zone: UTC+3:30 (IRST)
  - Summer (DST): UTC+4:30 (IRDT)

Firuzeh (Persian: فيروزه, also Romanized as Fīrūzeh) is a village in Shahrestaneh Rural District, Now Khandan District, Dargaz County, Razavi Khorasan Province, Iran. At the 2006 census, its population was 171, in 51 families.
