= Gorazabad, Chaharmahal and Bakhtiari =

AliAbad علی آباد
- Village
- Location within Iran
- Coordinates: 31°30′36″N 50°45′50″E
- Country: Iran
- Province: Chaharmahal and Bakhtiari
- County: Lordegan
- Bakhsh: Central
- Rural District: Milas

Population (2006)
  - Total: 451
- Time zone: UTC+3:30 (IRST)
  - Summer (DST): UTC+4:30 (IRDT)

Gorazabad (Persian: گرازاباد, also Romanized as Gorāzābād) is a village in Milas Rural District, in the Central District of Lordegan County, Chaharmahal and Bakhtiari Province, Iran. At the 2006 census, its population was 451, in 81 families. The village is populated by Lurs.
