= Qaleh Sefid, Fars =

Qaleh Sefid قلعه سفيد
- Village
- Location within Iran
- Coordinates: 30°18′38″N 51°42′37″E
- Country: Iran
- Province: Fars
- County: Mamasani
- Bakhsh: Central
- Rural District: Jowzar

Population (2006)
  - Total: 67
- Time zone: UTC+3:30 (IRST)
  - Summer (DST): UTC+4:30 (IRDT)

Qaleh Sefid (Persian: قلعه سفيد, also Romanized as Qal‘eh Sefīd) is a village in Jowzar Rural District, in the Central District of Mamasani County, Fars province, Iran. At the 2006 census, its population was 67, in 21 families.
