= Dekhmeh Rawansar =

Tomb in Ravansar, Iran

Dekhmeye Rawansar or Koshk (Persian: دخمه روانسر) is a rock-cut tomb located near the town of Ravansar, about 57 km northwest of Kermanshah in western Iran. This tomb was known to Ernst Herzfeld but he never visited it. The first archaeologist who visited the tomb was Massoud Golzari, an Iranian archaeologist who attributed it to Medes. It was re-visited and examined by Peter Calmeyer, German archaeologist (birth. 5 September 1930 in Halle, death. 22 November 1995 in Berlin) in the 1970s, who according to his observations related the tomb to the Achaemenid period.

The old part of the town is built at the foot of the isolated rock of Qola, into its northeastern face the tomb is cut, looking out over the plain and the Weshkaro seasonal river. An area was smoothed to form a vertical facade with a narrow ledge at its foot; and at one side of this facade a rectangular doorway was made, probably to be closed by a single slab of stone. This leads directly into the tomb chamber, which is roughly square and quite plain, there is nothing to indicate how the dead were disposed of in it, but it is large enough to have held several coffins or numerous receptacles for bones. Outside there are carvings in the smoothed area, but are badly weathered. These reliefs consist of a weathered human figure that standing close to the door and his face is toward right. Above is a man on a winged disk that faces left. Under this winged figure there is a parallelogram diagonally laid and divided by 12 longitudinal lines which interpreted by Calmeyer as wood fuel. Above the tomb the cliff is almost sheer, but from below it is accessible. No attempt has been made to smooth away the rock; and this may indicate that it was a family tomb, used repeatedly. Based on its architecture it can be dated to the Achaemenid period, probably after the reign of Darius the Great. The tomb has been damaged by fire and graffiti during recent years.

A column base with probable same age have been found close to the Goni Khani spring that emerge at the western slope of Qola rock. Recently two other column bases were found in the town and moved to Rawansar Municipality. Some Sherds dating to first mill. bc. also have been collected around the Qola rock indicating its importance during Late Iron Age to early Achaemenid period.
