= Elyasi-ye Saleh Matta =

Elyasi-ye Saleh Matta الياسي صالح مطاع
- Village
- Location within Iran
- Coordinates: 34°35′56″N 45°55′05″E
- Country: Iran
- Province: Kermanshah
- County: Sarpol-e Zahab
- Bakhsh: Central
- Rural District: Posht Tang

Population (2006)
  - Total: 129
- Time zone: UTC+3:30 (IRST)
  - Summer (DST): UTC+4:30 (IRDT)

Elyasi-ye Saleh Matta (Persian: الياسي صالح مطاع, also Romanized as Elyāsī-ye Şāleḩ Maţţā‘) is a village in Posht Tang Rural District, in the Central District of Sarpol-e Zahab County, Kermanshah Province, Iran. At the 2006 census, its population was 129, in 23 families.
