= Shabankareh, Razavi Khorasan =

Shabankareh شبانكاره
- Village
- Location within Iran
- Coordinates: 36°25′26″N 59°33′05″E
- Country: Iran
- Province: Razavi Khorasan
- County: Mashhad
- Bakhsh: Central
- Rural District: Tus

Population (2006)
  - Total: 69
- Time zone: UTC+3:30 (IRST)
  - Summer (DST): UTC+4:30 (IRDT)

Shabankareh (Persian: شبانكاره, also Romanized as Shabānkāreh) is a village in Tus Rural District, Central District, Mashhad County, Razavi Khorasan Province, Iran. At the 2006 census, its population was 69 in 14 families.
