= Gorazabad, Hormozgan =

Gorazabad گرازاباد
- Village
- Location within Iran
- Coordinates: 27°48′39″N 57°12′06″E
- Country: Iran
- Province: Hormozgan
- County: Rudan
- Bakhsh: Rudkhaneh
- Rural District: Mosaferabad

Population (2006)
  - Total: 49
- Time zone: UTC+3:30 (IRST)
  - Summer (DST): UTC+4:30 (IRDT)

Gorazabad (Persian: گرازاباد, also Romanized as Gorāzābād) is a village in Mosaferabad Rural District, Rudkhaneh District, Rudan County, Hormozgan Province, Iran. At the 2006 census, its population was 49, in 12 families.
