= Qaleh Sefid-e Sheykh Hasan =

Qaleh Sefid-e Sheykh Hasan قلعه سفيدشيخ حسن
- Village
- Location within Iran
- Coordinates: 34°22′48″N 45°54′58″E
- Country: Iran
- Province: Kermanshah
- County: Sarpol-e Zahab
- Bakhsh: Central
- Rural District: Qaleh Shahin

Population (2006)
  - Total: 278
- Time zone: UTC+3:30 (IRST)
  - Summer (DST): UTC+4:30 (IRDT)

Qaleh Sefid-e Sheykh Hasan (Persian: قلعه سفيدشيخ حسن, also Romanized as Qal‘eh Sefīd-e Sheykh Ḩasan; also known as Pā’īn Qal‘eh Sefīd and Sheykh Ḩasan) is a village in Qaleh Shahin Rural District, in the Central District of Sarpol-e Zahab County, Kermanshah Province, Iran. In the 2006 census, its population was 278, in 64 families.
