= Qaleh Sefid-e Olya, Kermanshah =

Village in Kermanshah, Iran

Qaleh Sefid-e Olya قلعه سفيدعليا
- Village
- Location within Iran
- Coordinates: 34°22′26″N 45°55′21″E
- Country: Iran
- Province: Kermanshah
- County: Sarpol-e Zahab
- Bakhsh: Central
- Rural District: Qaleh Shahin

Population (2006)
  - Total: 156
- Time zone: UTC+3:30 (IRST)
  - Summer (DST): UTC+4:30 (IRDT)

Qaleh Sefid-e Olya (Persian: قلعه سفيدعليا, also Romanized as Qal‘eh Sefīd-e ‘Olyā; also known as Qal‘a Shahin, Qal‘eh Sefīd, Qal‘eh Sefīd-e Qāsem, Qal‘eh Sefīd-e Qasen, Qal‘eh Shāhin, and Qal‘eh-ye Safīd) is a village in Qaleh Shahin Rural District, in the Central District of Sarpol-e Zahab County, Kermanshah Province, Iran. At the 2006 census, its population was 156, in 32 families.
