= Firuzeh, North Khorasan =

Firuzeh فيروزه
- Village
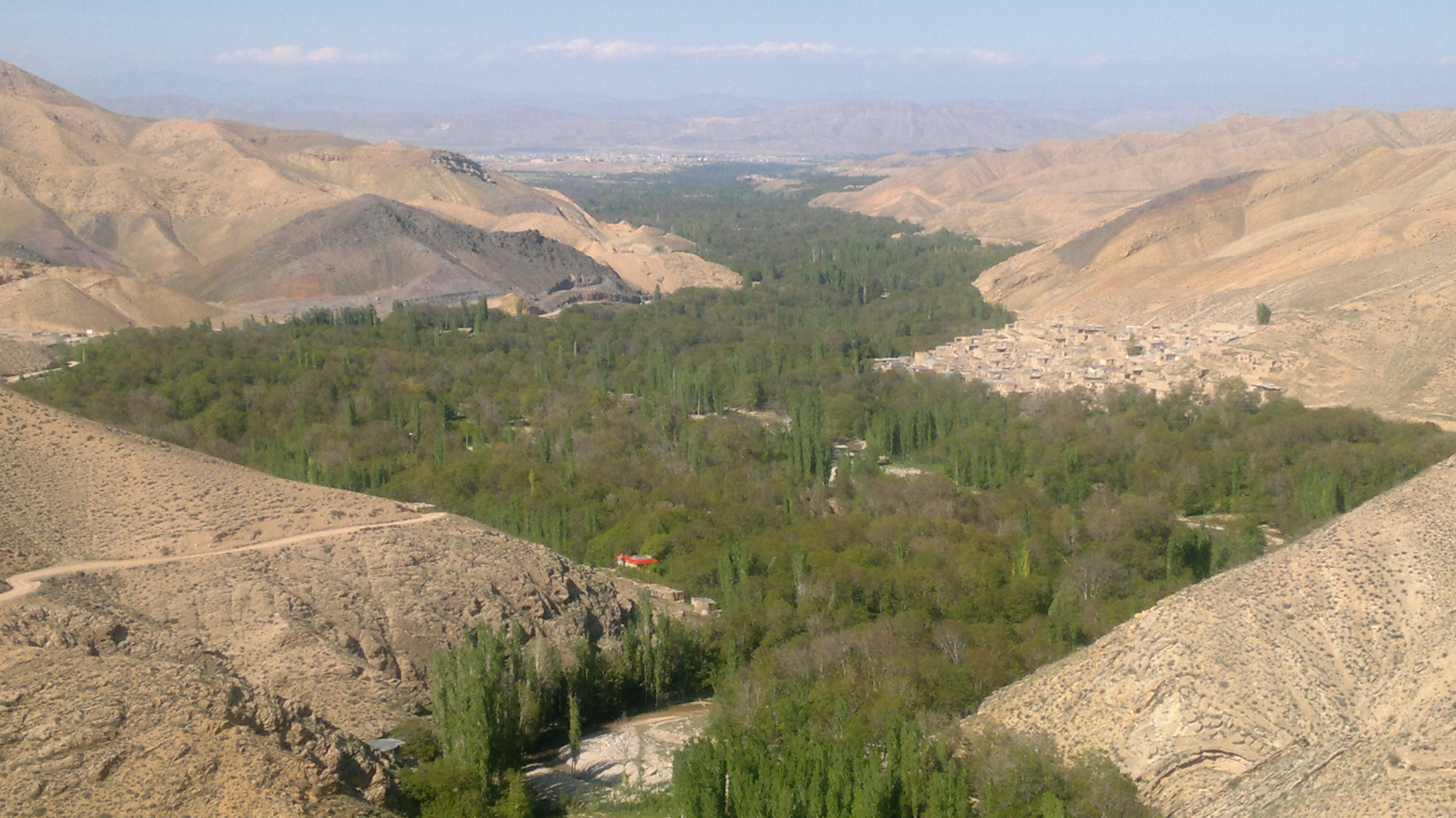

- Location within Iran
- Coordinates: 37°21′21″N 57°14′48″E
- Country: Iran
- Province: North Khorasan
- County: Bojnord
- Bakhsh: Central
- Rural District: Aladagh

Population (2006)
  - Total: 393
- Time zone: UTC+3:30 (IRST)
  - Summer (DST): UTC+4:30 (IRDT)

Firuzeh (Persian: فيروزه, also Romanized as Fīrūzeh) is a village in Aladagh Rural District, in the Central District of Bojnord County, North Khorasan Province, Iran. At the 2006 census, its population was 393, in 99 families.
