= Eleyas =

Eleyas الياس
- Village
- Location within Iran
- Coordinates: 32°04′38″N 49°29′45″E
- Country: Iran
- Province: Khuzestan
- County: Andika
- Bakhsh: Abezhdan
- Rural District: Abezhdan

Population (2006)
  - Total: 321
- Time zone: UTC+3:30 (IRST)
  - Summer (DST): UTC+4:30 (IRDT)

Eleyas (Persian: الياس, also Romanized as Eleyās and Elyās; also known as Elyās-e Ābezhdān and Elyās Moḩebbī) is a village in Abezhdan Rural District, Abezhdan District, Andika County, Khuzestan Province, Iran. At the 2006 census, its population was 321, in 59 families.
