= Kazaz =

Collection of villages and small towns in Iran

Kazaz is a collection of villages and small towns that are in a short distance from Arak, Iran.
