= Elyasi-ye Khalifeh Hoseyn =

Village in Kermanshah, Iran

Elyasi-ye Khalifeh Hoseyn الياسي خليفه حسين
- Village
- Location within Iran
- Coordinates: 34°36′04″N 45°52′19″E
- Country: Iran
- Province: Kermanshah
- County: Sarpol-e Zahab
- Bakhsh: Central
- Rural District: Dasht-e Zahab

Population (2006)
  - Total: 170
- Time zone: UTC+3:30 (IRST)
  - Summer (DST): UTC+4:30 (IRDT)

Elyasi-ye Khalifeh Hoseyn (Persian: الياسي خليفه حسين, also Romanized as Elyāsī-ye Khalīfeh Ḩoseyn; also known as Elyās-e Khalīfeh Ḩasan) is a village in Dasht-e Zahab Rural District, in the Central District of Sarpol-e Zahab County, Kermanshah Province, Iran. At the 2006 census, its population was 170, in 34 families.
