= Qaleh Sefid-e Olya, Khuzestan =

Qaleh Sefid-e Olya قلعه سفيدعليا
- Village
- Location within Iran
- Coordinates: 31°58′20″N 49°34′54″E
- Country: Iran
- Province: Khuzestan
- County: Izeh
- Bakhsh: Central
- Rural District: Margha

Population (2006)
  - Total: 68
- Time zone: UTC+3:30 (IRST)
  - Summer (DST): UTC+4:30 (IRDT)

Qaleh Sefid-e Olya (Persian: قلعه سفيدعليا, also Romanized as Qal‘eh Sefīd-e ‘Olyā; also known as Qal‘eh Sefīd, Qal‘eh-ye Safīd, and Qal‘eh-ye Sefīd) is a village in Margha Rural District, in the Central District of Izeh County, Khuzestan Province, Iran. In the 2006 census, its population was 68 persons, in 15 families.
