= Elyas-e Mahmud =

Elyas-e Mahmud الياس محمود
- Village
- Location within Iran
- Coordinates: 34°36′25″N 45°52′01″E
- Country: Iran
- Province: Kermanshah
- County: Sarpol-e Zahab
- Bakhsh: Central
- Rural District: Dasht-e Zahab

Population (2006)
  - Total: 220
- Time zone: UTC+3:30 (IRST)
  - Summer (DST): UTC+4:30 (IRDT)

Elyas-e Mahmud (Persian: الياس محمود, also Romanized as Elyās-e Maḩmūd; also known as Elyāsī-ye Maḩmūd) is a village in Dasht-e Zahab Rural District, in the Central District of Sarpol-e Zahab County, Kermanshah Province, Iran. At the 2006 census, its population was 220, in 39 families.
