= Quri Qaleh Rural District =

Rural district in Kermanshah province, Iran

Quri Qaleh Rural District Persian: دهستان قوری ‌قلعه
- Rural District
- Location within Iran
- Coordinates: 34°51′58″N 46°30′55″E
- Country: Iran
- Province: Kermanshah
- County: Ravansar
- District: Shahu
- Capital: Quri Qaleh

Population (2016)
  - Total: 2,352
- Time zone: UTC+3:30 (IRST)

Quri Qaleh Rural District (Persian: دهستان قوری ‌قلعه) is in Shahu District of Ravansar County, Kermanshah province, Iran. Its capital is the village of Quri Qaleh.

== Demographics ==
=== Population ===
At the time of the 2006 National Census, the rural district's population was 3,031 in 624 households. There were 2,987 inhabitants in 747 households at the following census of 2011. The 2016 census measured the population of the rural district as 2,352 in 671 households. The most populous of its eight villages was Quri Qaleh, with 891 people.
