= Shahu District =

District in Kermanshah province, Iran

Shahu District Persian: بخش شاهو
- District
- Location within Iran
- Coordinates: 34°53′25″N 46°30′49″E
- Country: Iran
- Province: Kermanshah
- County: Ravansar
- Capital: Shahu

Population (2016)
  - Total: 6,922
- Time zone: UTC+3:30 (IRST)

Shahu District (Persian: بخش شاهو) is in Ravansar County, Kermanshah province, Iran. Its capital is the city of Shahu (formerly Mansur-e Aqai).

== History ==
After the 2006 National Census, the village of Mansur-e Aqai, after merging with another village, was elevated to city status as Shahu.

== Demographics ==
=== Population ===
At the time of the 2006 census, the district's population was 8,119 in 1,774 households. The following census in 2011 counted 7,521 people in 1,908 households. The 2016 census measured the population of the district as 6,922 inhabitants in 1,999 households.

=== Administrative divisions ===
Shahu District Population
| Administrative Divisions | 2006 | 2011 | 2016 |
|---|---|---|---|
| Mansur-e Aqai RD | 5,088 | 1,192 | 1,012 |
| Quri Qaleh RD | 3,031 | 2,987 | 2,352 |
| Shahu (city) (Note: Formerly the village of Mansur-e Aqai) | | 3,342 | 3,558 |
| Total | 8,119 | 7,521 | 6,922 |
RD = Rural District
