= Hasanabad Rural District (Ravansar County) =

Rural district in Kermanshah province, Iran

Hasanabad Rural District Persian: دهستان حسن آباد
- Rural District
- Location within Iran
- Coordinates: 34°36′39″N 46°43′17″E
- Country: Iran
- Province: Kermanshah
- County: Ravansar
- District: Central
- Capital: Hasanabad

Population (2016)
  - Total: 5,174
- Time zone: UTC+3:30 (IRST)

Hasanabad Rural District (Persian: دهستان حسن آباد) is in the Central District of Ravansar County, Kermanshah province, Iran. Its capital is the village of Hasanabad.

== Demographics ==
=== Population ===
At the time of the 2006 National Census, the rural district's population was 5,892 in 1,334 households. There were 5,473 inhabitants in 1,480 households at the following census of 2011. The 2016 census measured the population of the rural district as 5,174 in 1,473 households. The most populous of its 48 villages was Hasanabad, with 924 people.
