= Dowlatabad Rural District (Ravansar County) =

Rural district in Kermanshah province, Iran

Dowlatabad Rural District Persian: دهستان دولت اباد
- Rural District
- Location within Iran
- Coordinates: 34°40′49″N 46°29′44″E
- Country: Iran
- Province: Kermanshah
- County: Ravansar
- District: Central
- Capital: Dowlatabad

Population (2016)
  - Total: 3,295
- Time zone: UTC+3:30 (IRST)

Dowlatabad Rural District (Persian: دهستان دولت اباد) is in the Central District of Ravansar County, Kermanshah province, Iran. Its capital is the village of Dowlatabad.

== Demographics ==
=== Population ===
At the time of the 2006 National Census, the rural district's population was 4,015 in 834 households. There were 3,669 inhabitants in 946 households at the following census of 2011. The 2016 census measured the population of the rural district as 3,295 in 960 households. The most populous of its 34 villages was Dowlatabad, with 326 people.
