= Badr Rural District (Ravansar County) =

Rural district in Kermanshah province, Iran

Badr Rural District Persian: دهستان بدر
- Rural District
- Location within Iran
- Coordinates: 34°45′38″N 46°39′55″E
- Country: Iran
- Province: Kermanshah
- County: Ravansar
- District: Central
- Capital: Borhan ol Din

Population (2016)
  - Total: 3,996
- Time zone: UTC+3:30 (IRST)

Badr Rural District (Persian: دهستان بدر) is in the Central District of Ravansar County, Kermanshah province, Iran. Its capital is the village of Borhan ol Din.

== Demographics ==
=== Population ===
At the time of the 2006 National Census, the rural district's population was 6,412 in 1,351 households. There were 4,536 inhabitants in 1,147 households at the following census of 2011. The 2016 census measured the population of the rural district as 3,996 in 1,116 households. The most populous of its 36 villages was Kharajian, with 564 people.
