= Zalu Ab Rural District =

Rural district in Kermanshah province, Iran

Zalu Ab Rural District Persian: دهستان زالوآب
- Rural District
- Location within Iran
- Coordinates: 34°36′05″N 46°35′14″E
- Country: Iran
- Province: Kermanshah
- County: Ravansar
- District: Central
- Capital: Zalu Ab

Population (2016)
  - Total: 3,717
- Time zone: UTC+3:30 (IRST)

Zalu Ab Rural District (Persian: دهستان زالوآب) is in the Central District of Ravansar County, Kermanshah province, Iran. Its capital is the village of Zalu Ab.

== Demographics ==
=== Population ===
At the time of the 2006 National Census, the rural district's population was 4,162 in 881 households. There were 3,946 inhabitants in 1,074 households at the following census of 2011. The 2016 census measured the population of the rural district as 3,717 in 1,111 households. The most populous of its 32 villages was Zalu Ab, with 659 people.
