= Central District (Ravansar County) =

District in Kermanshah province, Iran

Central District (Ravansar County) Persian: بخش مرکزی شهرستان روانسر
- District
- Location within Iran
- Coordinates: 34°41′45″N 46°35′51″E
- Country: Iran
- Province: Kermanshah
- County: Ravansar
- Capital: Ravansar

Population (2016)
  - Total: 40,709
- Time zone: UTC+3:30 (IRST)

The Central District of Ravansar County (Persian: بخش مرکزی شهرستان روانسر) is in Kermanshah province, Iran. Its capital is the city of Ravansar.

== Demographics ==
=== Population ===
At the time of the 2006 National Census, the district's population was 36,864 in 8,238 households. The following census in 2011 counted 38,874 people in 10,256 households. The 2016 census measured the population of the district as 40,709 inhabitants in 11,782 households.

=== Administrative divisions ===
Central District (Ravansar County) Population
Administrative Divisions	2006	2011	2016
Badr RD	6,412	4,536	3,996
Dowlatabad RD	4,015	3,669	3,295
Hasanabad RD	5,892	5,473	5,174
Zalu Ab RD	4,162	3,946	3,717
Ravansar (city)	16,383	21,250	24,527
Total	36,864	38,874	40,709
RD = Rural District
