= Ravansar County =

County in Kermanshah province, Iran

Ravansar County Persian: شهرستان روانسر
- County
- Location of Ravansar County in Kermanshah province (top, purple)

- Location of Kermanshah province in Iran
- Coordinates: 34°46′N 46°35′E
- Country: Iran
- Province: Kermanshah
- Capital: Ravansar
- Districts: Central, Shahu

Population (2016)
  - Total: 47,657
- Time zone: UTC+3:30 (IRST)

Ravansar County (Persian: شهرستان روانسر) is in Kermanshah province, Iran, part of what is unofficially referred to as Iranian Kurdistan. Its capital is the city of Ravansar.

== History ==
After the 2006 National Census, the village of Mansur-e Aqai, after merging with another village, was elevated to city status as Shahu.

== Demographics ==
=== Population ===
At the time of the 2006 census, the county's population was 44,983 in 10,012 households. The following census in 2011 counted 46,395 people in 12,140 households. The 2016 census measured the population of the county as 47,657 in 13,790 households.

=== Administrative divisions ===
Ravansar County's population history and administrative structure over three consecutive censuses are shown in the following table.

Ravansar County Population
Administrative Divisions	2006	2011	2016
Central District	36,864	38,874	40,709
Badr RD	6,412	4,536	3,996
Dowlatabad RD	4,015	3,669	3,295
Hasanabad RD	5,892	5,473	5,174
Zalu Ab RD	4,162	3,946	3,717
Ravansar (city)	16,383	21,250	24,527
Shahu District	8,119	7,521	6,922
Mansur-e Aqai RD	5,088	1,192	1,012
Quri Qaleh RD	3,031	2,987	2,352
Shahu (city) (Note: Formerly the village of Mansur-e Aqai)		3,342	3,558
Total	44,983	46,395	47,657
RD = Rural District

== Geography ==
The county is bounded in the north by Paveh County and Javanrud County, and in the south by Kermanshah County.

== Archaeology ==
The Ravansar region has much of archaeological interest. Evidence of early human occupation has been found in a number of caves around Ravansar, such as Mar Koulian and Mar Jawri. The area was important during the Iron Age and Achaemenid dynasty, as can be seen in the rock-cut tomb of Farhad and column bases found around Qoleh Rock north of the town.

== See also ==
Media related to Ravansar County at Wikimedia Commons
