= Kalak =

== Animals ==
- A maned wolf, a mammal natively known as "kalak" to the Toba people.

== Locations ==
Kalak or Kelek or Kelak or Kalek (Persian: کلک) may refer to:

- Kələk, a municipality in Azerbaijan
- Kelak, Alborz, a village in Iran
- Kalak, Bushehr, a village in Iran
- Kalak, Gilan, a village in Iran
- Kalak-e Amjadi, Kermanshah Province, a village in Iran
- Kalek-e Bayeh, Kermanshah Province, a village in Iran
- Kalek-e Olya, Kermanshah Province, a village in Iran
- Kalak-e Sar Bisheh, Kohgiluyeh and Boyer-Ahmad Province, a village in Iran
- Kalak, Lorestan, a village in Iran
- Kalak, Chalus, Mazandaran Province, Iran
- Kalak, Ramsar, a village in Iran
- Kalak, Sari, a village in Iran
- Kelak-e Olya, Mazandaran Province, Iran
- Kelak-e Sofla, Mazandaran Province, Iran
- Kalak, Iranshahr, Sistan and Baluchestan Province, Iran
- Kalak, South Khorasan, a village in Iran
- Kelak, Tehran, a village in Iran
- Kalak-e Naqi, a village in Iran
- Kalak Jafar, a village in Iran
- Kalak Khan, a village in Iran

== Music ==
- Kalak (album), by Sarathy Korwar

== See also ==
- Kalak Darreh (disambiguation)
- Kolak (disambiguation)
