= Jelow =

Jelow, Jilu, Jelu (Persian: جلو) may refer to:

- Jelow-e Olya, Kermanshah Province
- Jelow-e Sofla, Kermanshah Province
- Jelu, Kohgiluyeh and Boyer-Ahmad
- Jelu, Mazandaran
- Jelow, South Khorasan
- Jilu, an Assyrian tribe in southeastern Turkey
