= Karvaneh =

Karvaneh (Persian: كاروانه) may refer to:

- Karvaneh, Hamadan
- Karvaneh-ye Olya, Kermanshah Province
- Karvaneh-ye Sofla, Kermanshah Province
- Karvaneh-ye Vosta, Kermanshah Province
- Karvaneh, Lorestan
