= Tahaneh =

Tahaneh or Tahneh (Persian: طهنه) may refer to:

- Tahneh
- Tahaneh-ye Olya
- Tahaneh-ye Sofla
- Tahaneh-ye Vosta
