= Zeynalan =

Zeynalan or Zeynlan (Persian: زينلان) may refer to:

- Zeynalan-e Olya
- Zeynalan-e Olya, Jalalvand
- Zeynalan-e Pain
- Zeynalan-e Sofla
