= Kalk (surname) =

Kalk is a surname. Notable people with the surname include:

- Brian Kalk (born c. 1966), American civil servant
- Curt Kalk, American politician
- Jay Kalk (born 1975), American musician
- Stanton Frederick Kalk (1894–1917), United States Navy officer

== See also ==
- Kalk (disambiguation)
- Kali (name)
