= Zaneylan =

Zaneylan (Persian: زنيلان) may refer to:

- Zaneylan-e Olya
- Zaneylan-e Sofla

== See also ==
- Zeynalan (disambiguation)
