= Cheshmeh Sorkh =

Cheshmeh Sorkh or Cheshmeh-ye Sorkh (Persian: چشمه سرخ) may refer to:

- Cheshmeh Sorkh, Ilam
- Cheshmeh Sorkh, Kermanshah
- Cheshmeh Sorkh-e Qabr-e Baba, Kermanshah Province
- Cheshmeh Sorkh, Lorestan
