= Sar Jub =

Sar Jub or Sar-i-Jub or Sarjoob or Sarjub (Persian: سرجوب) may refer to:

- Sar Jub, Kermanshah
- Sar Jub-e Qaleh Masgareh, Kermanshah Province
- Sarjub, Sistan and Baluchestan
- Sar-i-Jub, South Khorasan
