= Gorgavan =

Village in Kermanshah, Iran

Gorgavan گرگاوان
- Village
- Location within Iran
- Coordinates: 33°54′24″N 47°17′16″E
- Country: Iran
- Province: Kermanshah
- County: Kermanshah
- Bakhsh: Firuzabad
- Rural District: Osmanvand

Population (2006)
  - Total: 84
- Time zone: UTC+3:30 (IRST)
  - Summer (DST): UTC+4:30 (IRDT)

Gorgavan (Persian: گرگاوان, also Romanized as Gorgāvān; also known as Gorgābān and Gorgāvand) is a village in Osmanvand Rural District, Firuzabad District, Kermanshah County, Kermanshah Province, Iran. At the 2006 census, its population was 84, in 19 families.
