= Darreh Duzakh =

Darreh Duzakh دره دوزخ
- Village
- Location within Iran
- Coordinates: 33°51′49″N 47°14′09″E
- Country: Iran
- Province: Kermanshah
- County: Kermanshah
- Bakhsh: Firuzabad
- Rural District: Osmanvand

Population (2006)
  - Total: 100
- Time zone: UTC+3:30 (IRST)
  - Summer (DST): UTC+4:30 (IRDT)

Darreh Duzakh (Persian: دره دوزخ, also Romanized as Darreh Dūzakh) is a village in Osmanvand Rural District, Firuzabad District, Kermanshah County, Kermanshah Province, Iran. At the 2006 census, its population was 100, in 20 families.
