= Cheshmeh Shahrokh Masgareh =

Cheshmeh Shahrokh Masgareh چشمه شاهرخ مسگره
- Village
- Location within Iran
- Coordinates: 33°56′05″N 47°12′13″E
- Country: Iran
- Province: Kermanshah
- County: Kermanshah
- Bakhsh: Firuzabad
- Rural District: Osmanvand

Population (2006)
  - Total: 86
- Time zone: UTC+3:30 (IRST)
  - Summer (DST): UTC+4:30 (IRDT)

Cheshmeh Shahrokh Masgareh (Persian: چشمه شاهرخ مسگره, also Romanized as Cheshmeh Shāhrokh Masgareh; also known as Cheshmeh Shāhrokh) is a village in Osmanvand Rural District, Firuzabad District, Kermanshah County, Kermanshah Province, Iran. At the 2006 census, its population was 86, in 19 families.
