= Goljiran =

Goljiran گلجيران
- Village
- Location within Iran
- Coordinates: 33°49′05″N 47°15′19″E
- Country: Iran
- Province: Kermanshah
- County: Kermanshah
- Bakhsh: Firuzabad
- Rural District: Osmanvand

Population (2006)
  - Total: 72
- Time zone: UTC+3:30 (IRST)
  - Summer (DST): UTC+4:30 (IRDT)

Goljiran (Persian: گلجيران, also Romanized as Goljīrān and Gol Jīrān; also known as Gol Jīrān-e Soflá and Goljīrān-e Soflá) is a village in Osmanvand Rural District, Firuzabad District, Kermanshah County, Kermanshah Province, Iran. At the 2006 census, its population was 72, in 12 families.
