= Sameleh-ye Sofla =

Village in Kermanshah, Iran

Sameleh-ye Sofla سامله سفلي
- Village
- Location within Iran
- Coordinates: 34°01′14″N 47°18′26″E
- Country: Iran
- Province: Kermanshah
- County: Kermanshah
- Bakhsh: Firuzabad
- Rural District: Sar Firuzabad

Population (2006)
  - Total: 309
- Time zone: UTC+3:30 (IRST)
  - Summer (DST): UTC+4:30 (IRDT)

Sameleh-ye Sofla (Persian: سامله سفلي, also Romanized as Sāmeleh-ye Soflá; also known as Sāmeleh) is a village in Sar Firuzabad Rural District, Firuzabad District, Kermanshah County, Kermanshah Province, Iran. At the 2006 census, its population was 309, in 66 families.
