= Poshteh Rizeh =

Poshteh Rizeh (Persian: پشته ريزه) may refer to:

- Poshteh Rizeh-ye Sofla
- Poshteh Rizeh-ye Vosta
