= Kalk =

Kalk or KALK may refer to:

- Kalk (surname)
- Kalk, Cologne, a borough of Cologne, Germany
- Kalk, Poland, a settlement in Kościerzyna County, Pomeranian Voivodeship
- Chemische Fabrik Kalk, a former German chemical company
- USS Kalk (DD-170), a US destroyer during World War I
- Abbreviation for Kalkaska, Michigan
- Kalk, an Afrikaans, Swedish, Dutch and German word meaning limestone
- KALK, an American radio station

== See also ==
- Calk (disambiguation)
- KALC, an American radio station
- Kalak (disambiguation)
