= Dilanchi =

Dilanchi (Persian: ديلانچي) may refer to:

- Dilanchi-ye Arkhi-ye Pain, East Azerbaijan Province
- Dilanchi-ye Olya, Kermanshah Province
- Dilanchi-ye Sofla, Kermanshah Province
