= Zard-e Sheykh Hasan =

Zard-e Sheykh Hasan زردشيخ حسن
- village
- Location within Iran
- Coordinates: 33°52′02″N 47°10′52″E
- Country: Iran
- Province: Kermanshah
- County: Kermanshah
- Bakhsh: Firuzabad
- Rural District: Osmanvand

Population (2006)
  - Total: 24
- Time zone: UTC+3:30 (IRST)
  - Summer (DST): UTC+4:30 (IRDT)

Zard-e Sheykh Hasan (Persian: زردشيخ حسن, romanized: Zard-e Sheykh Ḩasan or Zard-e Sheykh; also known as Zard) is a village in Osmanvand Rural District, Firuzabad District, Kermanshah County, Kermanshah Province, Iran. At the 2006 census, its population was 24, in 4 families.
