= Porgoli =

Porgoli (Persian: پرگلي) may refer to:

- Porgoli-ye Olya
- Porgoli-ye Sofla
