= Bagh-e Tighun =

Bagh-e Tighun باغ طيغون
- Village
- Location within Iran
- Coordinates: 34°05′08″N 47°09′39″E
- Country: Iran
- Province: Kermanshah
- County: Kermanshah
- Bakhsh: Firuzabad
- Rural District: Sar Firuzabad

Population (2006)
  - Total: 312
- Time zone: UTC+3:30 (IRST)
  - Summer (DST): UTC+4:30 (IRDT)

Bagh-e Tighun (Persian: باغ طيغون, also Romanized as Bāgh-e Ţīghūn; also known as Bāgh-e Ţīfūn, Bāgh-e Tīghān, Bāgh-e Ţīqūn, Bāgh-e Tūkhan, Bāgh-i-Taighān, Baghţīqūn, and Bakh Tūkhen) is a village in Sar Firuzabad Rural District, Firuzabad District, Kermanshah County, Kermanshah Province, Iran. At the 2006 census, its population was 312, in 73 families.
