= Sameleh-ye Olya =

Sameleh-ye Olya سامله عليا
- Village
- Location within Iran
- Coordinates: 34°00′36″N 47°17′19″E
- Country: Iran
- Province: Kermanshah
- County: Kermanshah
- Bakhsh: Firuzabad
- Rural District: Sar Firuzabad

Population (2006)
  - Total: 144
- Time zone: UTC+3:30 (IRST)
  - Summer (DST): UTC+4:30 (IRDT)

Sameleh-ye Olya (Persian: سامله عليا, also Romanized as Sāmeleh-ye ‘Olyā) is a village in Sar Firuzabad Rural District, Firuzabad District, Kermanshah County, Kermanshah Province, Iran. At the 2006 census, its population was 144, in 30 families.
