= Bagh-e Beyglari =

Bagh-e Beyglari باغ بيگلري
- Village
- Location within Iran
- Coordinates: 34°05′23″N 47°08′48″E
- Country: Iran
- Province: Kermanshah
- County: Kermanshah
- Bakhsh: Firuzabad
- Rural District: Sar Firuzabad

Population (2006)
  - Total: 84
- Time zone: UTC+3:30 (IRST)
  - Summer (DST): UTC+4:30 (IRDT)

Bagh-e Beyglari (Persian: باغ بيگلري, also Romanized as Bāgh-e Beyglarī; also known as Beyglarī) is a village in Sar Firuzabad Rural District, Firuzabad District, Kermanshah County, Kermanshah Province, Iran. As of the 2006 census, its population consisted of 84 individuals, in 20 families.
