= Jalal, Iran =

Jalal (Persian: جلال) in Iran may refer to:

- Jalal, Kermanshah
- Jalal, South Khorasan
