= Posht Kabud-e Jahangirvand =

Village in Kermanshah, Iran

Posht Kabud-e Jahangirvand پشت كبودجهانگيروند
- Village
- Location within Iran
- Coordinates: 33°52′17″N 47°12′25″E
- Country: Iran
- Province: Kermanshah
- County: Kermanshah
- Bakhsh: Firuzabad
- Rural District: Osmanvand

Population (2006)
  - Total: 185
- Time zone: UTC+3:30 (IRST)
  - Summer (DST): UTC+4:30 (IRDT)

Posht Kabud-e Jahangirvand (Persian: پشت كبودجهانگيروند, also Romanized as Posht Kabūd-e Jahāngīrvand; also known as Posht Kabūd) is a village in Osmanvand Rural District, Firuzabad District, Kermanshah County, Kermanshah Province, Iran. At the 2006 census, its population was 185, in 38 families.
