= Kenar Marg =

Kenar Marg كنارمرگ
- Village
- Location within Iran
- Coordinates: 34°09′05″N 46°59′59″E
- Country: Iran
- Province: Kermanshah
- County: Kermanshah
- Bakhsh: Firuzabad
- Rural District: Sar Firuzabad

Population (2006)
  - Total: 169
- Time zone: UTC+3:30 (IRST)
  - Summer (DST): UTC+4:30 (IRDT)

Kenar Marg (Persian: كنارمرگ, also Romanized as Kenār Marg and Kenār Merreg) is a village in Sar Firuzabad Rural District, Firuzabad District, Kermanshah County, Kermanshah Province, Iran. At the 2006 census, its population was 169, in 35 families.
