= Gerdakan Dar =

Gerdakan Dar or Gerda Kandar (Persian: گردكاندار) may refer to:

- Gerdakan Dar-e Olya
- Gerdakan Dar-e Sofla
