= Godar Pir =

Godar Pir (Persian: گدارپير), also known as Godarpey, may refer to:

- Godar Pir-e Olya
- Godar Pir-e Sofla
