= Gazaf-e Sofla =

Gazaf-e Sofla گزاف سفلي
- Village
- Location within Iran
- Coordinates: 34°06′03″N 47°06′15″E
- Country: Iran
- Province: Kermanshah
- County: Kermanshah
- Bakhsh: Firuzabad
- Rural District: Sar Firuzabad

Population (2006)
  - Total: 138
- Time zone: UTC+3:30 (IRST)
  - Summer (DST): UTC+4:30 (IRDT)

Gazaf-e Sofla (Persian: گزاف سفلي, also Romanized as Gazāf-e Soflá) is a village in Sar Firuzabad Rural District, Firuzabad District, Kermanshah County, Kermanshah Province, Iran. At the 2006 census, its population was 138, in 24 families.
