= Khub Yaran =

Khub Yaran (Persian: خوبياران) may refer to:

- Khub Yaran-e Olya
- Khub Yaran-e Sofla
