= Sekher =

Sekher (Persian: سخر) may refer to:

- Sekher-e Olya
- Sekher-e Sofla
