= Mast Ali-ye Olya =

Mast Ali-ye Olya مستعلی علیا
- Village
- Location within Iran
- Coordinates: 33°58′58″N 47°06′09″E
- Country: Iran
- Province: Kermanshah
- County: Kermanshah
- Bakhsh: Firuzabad
- Rural District: Osmanvand

Population (2006)
  - Total: 320
- Time zone: UTC+3:30 (IRST)
  - Summer (DST): UTC+4:30 (IRDT)

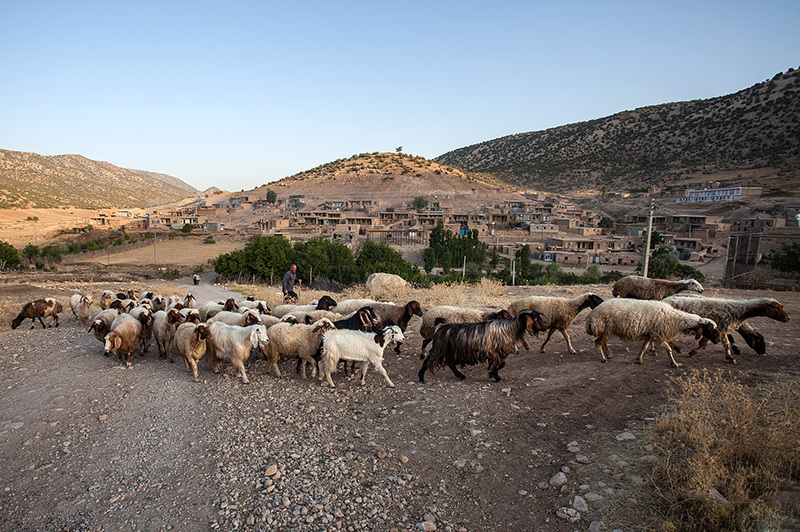
Mast Ali in 2015

Mast Ali-ye Olya (Persian: مستعلی علیا, also Romanized as Mast ‘Alī-ye ‘Olyā; also known as Mast ‘Alī and Mast‘alī) is a village in Osmanvand Rural District, Firuzabad District, Kermanshah County, Kermanshah Province, Iran. At the 2006 census, its population was 320, in 66 families.
