= Sarv-e Nav =

Sarv-e Nav (Persian: سرونو) may refer to:

- Sarv-e Nav-e Olya
- Sarv-e Nav-e Sofla
