= Koreh Jub =

Koreh Jub كره جوب
- Village
- Location within Iran
- Coordinates: 34°02′56″N 47°16′29″E
- Country: Iran
- Province: Kermanshah
- County: Kermanshah
- Bakhsh: Firuzabad
- Rural District: Sar Firuzabad

Population (2006)
  - Total: 20
- Time zone: UTC+3:30 (IRST)
  - Summer (DST): UTC+4:30 (IRDT)

Koreh Jub (Persian: كره جوب, also Romanized as Koreh Jūb; also known as Kūreh Jūb) is a village in Sar Firuzabad Rural District, Firuzabad District, Kermanshah County, Kermanshah Province, Iran. At the 2006 census, its population was 20, in 4 families.
