= Vargachgeh-ye Zeyyed Ali =

Vargachgeh-ye Zeyyed Ali ورگچگه زيد علي
- Village
- Location within Iran
- Coordinates: 33°50′38″N 47°05′39″E
- Country: Iran
- Province: Kermanshah
- County: Kermanshah
- Bakhsh: Firuzabad
- Rural District: Jalalvand

Population (2006)
  - Total: 21
- Time zone: UTC+3:30 (IRST)
  - Summer (DST): UTC+4:30 (IRDT)

Vargachgeh-ye Zeyyed Ali (Persian: ورگچگه زيد علي, also Romanized as Vargachgeh-ye Zeyyed ʿAlī; also known as Vargachlekeh) is a village in Jalalvand Rural District, Firuzabad District, Kermanshah County, Kermanshah Province, Iran. At the 2006 census, its population was 21, in 5 families.
