= Bara Belutestan-e Palkaneh =

Bara Belutestan-e Palkaneh بربلوطستان پلكانه
- Village
- Location within Iran
- Coordinates: 33°51′53″N 47°10′10″E
- Country: Iran
- Province: Kermanshah
- County: Kermanshah
- Bakhsh: Firuzabad
- Rural District: Jalalvand

Population (2006)
  - Total: 57
- Time zone: UTC+3:30 (IRST)
  - Summer (DST): UTC+4:30 (IRDT)

Bara Belutestan-e Palkaneh (Persian: بربلوطستان پلكانه, also Romanized as Bara Belūṭestān-e Palkāneh; also known as Barā Belūjestān and Bāyevand) is a village in Jalalvand Rural District, Firuzabad District, Kermanshah County, Kermanshah Province, Iran. At the 2006 census, its population was 57, in 11 families.
