= Sar Tappeh-ye Zanganeh =

Village in Kermanshah, Iran

Sar Tappeh-ye Zanganeh سرتپه زنگنه
- Village
- Location within Iran
- Coordinates: 34°06′00″N 47°07′30″E
- Country: Iran
- Province: Kermanshah
- County: Kermanshah
- Bakhsh: Firuzabad
- Rural District: Sar Firuzabad

Population (2006)
  - Total: 116
- Time zone: UTC+3:30 (IRST)
  - Summer (DST): UTC+4:30 (IRDT)

Sar Tappeh-ye Zanganeh (Persian: سرتپه زنگنه; also known as Sar Tappeh) is a village in Sar Firuzabad Rural District, Firuzabad District, Kermanshah County, Kermanshah Province, Iran. At the 2006 census, its population was 116, in 22 families.
