= Sarzal =

Sarzal سرزل
- Village
- Location within Iran
- Coordinates: 33°50′45″N 47°02′40″E
- Country: Iran
- Province: Kermanshah
- County: Kermanshah
- Bakhsh: Firuzabad
- Rural District: Jalalvand

Population (2006)
  - Total: 162
- Time zone: UTC+3:30 (IRST)
  - Summer (DST): UTC+4:30 (IRDT)

Sarzal (Persian: سرزل) is a village in Jalalvand Rural District, Firuzabad District, Kermanshah County, Kermanshah Province, Iran. At the 2006 census, its population was 162, in 37 families.
