= Now Jub =

Now Jub نوجوب
- Village
- Location within Iran
- Coordinates: 34°06′10″N 47°06′44″E
- Country: Iran
- Province: Kermanshah
- County: Kermanshah
- Bakhsh: Firuzabad
- Rural District: Sar Firuzabad

Population (2006)
  - Total: 227
- Time zone: UTC+3:30 (IRST)
  - Summer (DST): UTC+4:30 (IRDT)

Now Jub (Persian: نوجوب, also Romanized as Now Jūb) is a village in Sar Firuzabad Rural District, Firuzabad District, Kermanshah County, Kermanshah Province, Iran. At the 2006 census, its population was 227, in 44 families.
