= Gavmareh =

Gavmareh گاومره
- Village
- Location within Iran
- Coordinates: 33°55′58″N 46°59′38″E
- Country: Iran
- Province: Kermanshah
- County: Kermanshah
- Bakhsh: Firuzabad
- Rural District: Jalalvand

Population (2006)
  - Total: 108
- Time zone: UTC+3:30 (IRST)
  - Summer (DST): UTC+4:30 (IRDT)

Gavmareh (Persian: گاومره, also Romanized as Gāvmareh; also known as Gāmmareh) is a village in Jalalvand Rural District, Firuzabad District, Kermanshah County, Kermanshah Province, Iran. At the 2006 census, its population was 108, in 23 families.
