= Khub Yaran-e Olya =

Khub Yaran-e Olya خوبياران عليا
- Village
- Location within Iran
- Coordinates: 33°53′01″N 47°07′54″E
- Country: Iran
- Province: Kermanshah
- County: Kermanshah
- Bakhsh: Firuzabad
- Rural District: Jalalvand

Population (2006)
  - Total: 296
- Time zone: UTC+3:30 (IRST)
  - Summer (DST): UTC+4:30 (IRDT)

Khub Yaran-e Olya (Persian: خوبياران عليا, also Romanized as Khūb Yārān-e ‘Olyā; also known as Khūb Yārān and Khūb Yārān-e Bālā) is a village in Jalalvand Rural District, Firuzabad District, Kermanshah County, Kermanshah Province, Iran. At the 2006 census, its population was 296, in 58 families.
