= Seh Chekan-e Meleh Shahi =

Village in Kermanshah, Iran

Seh Chekan-e Meleh Shahi سه چكان مله شاهي
- Village
- Location within Iran
- Coordinates: 33°58′48″N 46°57′28″E
- Country: Iran
- Province: Kermanshah
- County: Kermanshah
- Bakhsh: Firuzabad
- Rural District: Jalalvand

Population (2006)
  - Total: 289
- Time zone: UTC+3:30 (IRST)
  - Summer (DST): UTC+4:30 (IRDT)

Seh Chekan-e Meleh Shahi (Persian: سه چكان مله شاهي, also romanized as Seh Chekān-e Meleh Shāhī; also known as Malekshāhī, Meleh Shāhī, and Seh Chekān) is a village in Jalalvand Rural District, Firuzabad District, Kermanshah County, Kermanshah Province, Iran. At the 2006 census, its population was 289, in 61 families.
