= Zeynalan-e Sofla =

Zeynalan-e Sofla زينلان سفلي
- Village
- Location within Iran
- Coordinates: 33°59′34″N 47°04′40″E
- Country: Iran
- Province: Kermanshah
- County: Kermanshah
- Bakhsh: Firuzabad
- Rural District: Osmanvand

Population (2006)
  - Total: 80
- Time zone: UTC+3:30 (IRST)
  - Summer (DST): UTC+4:30 (IRDT)

Zeynalan-e Sofla (Persian: زينلان سفلي, also Romanized as Zeynalān-e Soflá; also known as Zeynlān) is a village in Osmanvand Rural District, Firuzabad District, Kermanshah County, Kermanshah Province, Iran. At the 2006 census, its population was 80, in 14 families.
