= Tahaneh-ye Vosta =

Tahaneh-ye Vosta طهنه وسطي
- Village
- Location within Iran
- Coordinates: 34°05′47″N 47°08′10″E
- Country: Iran
- Province: Kermanshah
- County: Kermanshah
- Bakhsh: Firuzabad
- Rural District: Sar Firuzabad

Population (2006)
  - Total: 75
- Time zone: UTC+3:30 (IRST)
  - Summer (DST): UTC+4:30 (IRDT)

Tahaneh-ye Vosta (Persian: طهنه وسطي, also Romanized as Ţahaneh-ye Vosţá and Ţahāneh-ye Vosţá) is a village in Sar Firuzabad Rural District, Firuzabad District, Kermanshah County, Kermanshah Province, Iran. At the 2006 census, its population was 75, in 16 families.
