= Zeynalan-e Olya =

Zeynalan-e Olya زينلان عليا
- Village
- Location within Iran
- Coordinates: 33°56′56″N 47°03′54″E
- Country: Iran
- Province: Kermanshah
- County: Kermanshah
- Bakhsh: Firuzabad
- Rural District: Osmanvand

Population (2006)
  - Total: 37
- Time zone: UTC+3:30 (IRST)
  - Summer (DST): UTC+4:30 (IRDT)

Zeynalan-e Olya (Persian: زينلان عليا, also Romanized as Zeynalān-e ‘Olyā; also known as Zeynlān) is a village in Osmanvand Rural District, Firuzabad District, Kermanshah County, Kermanshah Province, Iran. At the 2006 census, its population was 37, in 8 families.
