= Dilanchi-ye Olya =

Dilanchi-ye Olya ديلانچي عليا
- Village
- Location within Iran
- Coordinates: 34°06′26″N 47°06′58″E
- Country: Iran
- Province: Kermanshah
- County: Kermanshah
- Bakhsh: Firuzabad
- Rural District: Sar Firuzabad

Population (2006)
  - Total: 87
- Time zone: UTC+3:30 (IRST)
  - Summer (DST): UTC+4:30 (IRDT)

Dilanchi-ye Olya (Persian: ديلانچي عليا, also Romanized as Dīlānchī-ye ‘Olyā; also known as Dīlānchī) is a village in Sar Firuzabad Rural District, Firuzabad District, Kermanshah County, Kermanshah Province, Iran. At the 2006 census, its population was 87, in 19 families.
