= Kalgadarreh =

Kalgadarreh or Kalgeh Darreh (Persian: كلگه دره) may refer to:

- Kalgadarreh 1
- Kalgadarreh 2
