= Cheshmeh Sorkh, Kermanshah =

Cheshmeh Sorkh چشمه سرخ
- Village
- Location within Iran
- Coordinates: 33°59′25″N 47°16′01″E
- Country: Iran
- Province: Kermanshah
- County: Kermanshah
- Bakhsh: Firuzabad
- Rural District: Osmanvand

Population (2006)
  - Total: 74
- Time zone: UTC+3:30 (IRST)
  - Summer (DST): UTC+4:30 (IRDT)

Cheshmeh Sorkh (Persian: چشمه سرخ) is a village in Osmanvand Rural District, Firuzabad District, Kermanshah County, Kermanshah Province, Iran. At the 2006 census, its population was 74, in 16 families.
