= Malekshahi =

Malekshah (Persian: ملکشاهی) may refer to:

- Malekshahi dialect, see Southern Kurdish
- Malekshahi, Kermanshah
- Malekshahi County, in Ilam Province
