= Poshteh Rizeh-ye Sofla =

Village in Kermanshah, Iran

Poshteh Rizeh-ye Sofla پشته ريزه سفلي
- Village
- Location within Iran
- Coordinates: 34°04′34″N 47°11′19″E
- Country: Iran
- Province: Kermanshah
- County: Kermanshah
- Bakhsh: Firuzabad
- Rural District: Sar Firuzabad

Population (2006)
  - Total: 87
- Time zone: UTC+3:30 (IRST)
  - Summer (DST): UTC+4:30 (IRDT)

Poshteh Rizeh-ye Sofla (Persian: پشته ريزه سفلي, also Romanized as Poshteh Rīzeh-ye Soflá) is a village in Sar Firuzabad Rural District, Firuzabad District, Kermanshah County, Kermanshah Province, Iran. At the 2006 census, its population was 87, in 19 families.
