= Malek Hasan Yarijan =

Malek Hasan Yarijan ملك حسن ياريجان
- Village
- Location within Iran
- Coordinates: 33°53′58″N 47°05′07″E
- Country: Iran
- Province: Kermanshah
- County: Kermanshah
- Bakhsh: Firuzabad
- Rural District: Jalalvand

Population (2006)
  - Total: 72
- Time zone: UTC+3:30 (IRST)
  - Summer (DST): UTC+4:30 (IRDT)

Malek Hasan Yarijan (Persian: ملك حسن ياريجان, also Romanized as Malek Ḩasan Yārījān; also known as Malekḩasan) is a village in Jalalvand Rural District, Firuzabad District, Kermanshah County, Kermanshah Province, Iran. At the 2006 census, its population was 72, in 15 families.
