= Dilanchi-ye Sofla =

Village in Kermanshah, Iran

Dilanchi-ye Sofla ديلانچي سفلي
- Village
- Country: Iran
- Province: Kermanshah
- County: Kermanshah
- Bakhsh: Firuzabad
- Rural District: Sar Firuzabad

Population (2006)
  - Total: 87
- Time zone: UTC+3:30 (IRST)
  - Summer (DST): UTC+4:30 (IRDT)

Dilanchi-ye Sofla (Persian: ديلانچي سفلي, also Romanized as Dīlānchī-ye Soflá) is a village in Sar Firuzabad Rural District, Firuzabad District, Kermanshah County, Kermanshah Province, Iran. At the 2006 census, its population was 87, in 18 families.
