= Porgoli-ye Sofla =

Village in Kermanshah, Iran

Porgoli-ye Sofla پرگلي سفلي
- Village
- Location within Iran
- Coordinates: 33°52′17″N 47°00′19″E
- Country: Iran
- Province: Kermanshah
- County: Kermanshah
- Bakhsh: Firuzabad
- Rural District: Jalalvand

Population (2006)
  - Total: 69
- Time zone: UTC+3:30 (IRST)
  - Summer (DST): UTC+4:30 (IRDT)

Porgoli-ye Sofla (Persian: پرگلي سفلي, also Romanized as Porgolī-ye Soflá) is a village in Jalalvand Rural District, Firuzabad District, Kermanshah County, Kermanshah Province, Iran. At the 2006 census, its population was 69, in 12 families.
