= Calk =

Calk may refer to:

- Caulkin, a blunt projection on a horseshoe
- Calk, Kentucky, a community in Montgomery County, Kentucky, United States
- Stephen Calk (born 1967), American entrepreneur

== See also ==
- Caulk, a material used for sealing
- Calque, a type of loan word
- Kalk (disambiguation)
