= Kalek-e Olya =

Kalek-e Olya كلك عليا
- Village
- Location within Iran
- Coordinates: 33°50′55″N 47°04′40″E
- Country: Iran
- Province: Kermanshah
- County: Kermanshah
- Bakhsh: Firuzabad
- Rural District: Jalalvand

Population (2006)
  - Total: 30
- Time zone: UTC+3:30 (IRST)
  - Summer (DST): UTC+4:30 (IRDT)

Kalek-e Olya (Persian: كلك عليا, also Romanized as Kalek-e ‘Olyā) is a village in Jalalvand Rural District, Firuzabad District, Kermanshah County, Kermanshah Province, Iran. At the 2006 census, its population was 30, in 7 families.
