= Anjab-e Buzhan =

Village in Kermanshah province, Iran

Anjab-e Buzhan Persian: انجاب بوژان
- Village
- Location within Iran
- Coordinates: 33°57′49″N 47°14′44″E
- Country: Iran
- Province: Kermanshah
- County: Kermanshah
- District: Firuzabad
- Rural District: Osmanvand

Population (2016)
  - Total: 275
- Time zone: UTC+3:30 (IRST)

Anjab-e Buzhan (Persian: انجاب بوژان) (Note: Also romanized as Anjāb-e Būzhān; also known as Anjāb) is a village in, and the capital of, Osmanvand Rural District of Firuzabad District, Kermanshah County, Kermanshah province, Iran. The previous capital of the rural district was the village of Sar Jub-e Qaleh Masgareh.

== Demographics ==
=== Population ===
At the time of the 2006 National Census, the village's population was 230 in 46 households. The following census in 2011 counted 234 people in 58 households. The 2016 census measured the population of the village as 275 people in 65 households.
