= Malik Hasan (disambiguation) =

Nidal Malik Hasan is an American mass murderer and former U.S. Army officer.

Malik Hasan or Malek Hasan may also refer to:

- Malik Hasan Bahri, general and Prime minister of the Bahmani Sultanate
- Malik Hassan Sayeed, American film director
- Malek Hasan Yarijan, Iran, a village
