= Talal, Iran =

Talal تلل
- Village
- Location within Iran
- Coordinates: 33°54′06″N 47°07′48″E
- Country: Iran
- Province: Kermanshah
- County: Kermanshah
- Bakhsh: Firuzabad
- Rural District: Jalalvand

Population (2006)
  - Total: 208
- Time zone: UTC+3:30 (IRST)
  - Summer (DST): UTC+4:30 (IRDT)

Talal (Persian: تلل; also known as Jalal) is a village in Jalalvand Rural District, Firuzabad District, Kermanshah County, Kermanshah Province, Iran. At the 2006 census, its population was 208, in 40 families.
