= Godar Pir-e Olya =

Godar Pir-e Olya گدارپيرعليا
- Village
- Location within Iran
- Coordinates: 33°58′33″N 47°27′34″E
- Country: Iran
- Province: Kermanshah
- County: Kermanshah
- Bakhsh: Firuzabad
- Rural District: Sar Firuzabad

Population (2006)
  - Total: 25
- Time zone: UTC+3:30 (IRST)
  - Summer (DST): UTC+4:30 (IRDT)

Godar Pir-e Olya (Persian: گدارپيرعليا, also Romanized as Godār Pīr-e ‘Olyā; also known as Godārpey-ye ‘Olyā) is a village in Sar Firuzabad Rural District, Firuzabad District, Kermanshah County, Kermanshah Province, Iran. At the 2006 census, its population was 25, in 4 families.

== See also ==
- Gudar people
