= Tahaneh-ye Sofla =

Tahaneh-ye Sofla طهنه سفلي
- Village
- Location within Iran
- Coordinates: 34°05′49″N 47°08′18″E
- Country: Iran
- Province: Kermanshah
- County: Kermanshah
- Bakhsh: Firuzabad
- Rural District: Sar Firuzabad

Population (2006)
  - Total: 82
- Time zone: UTC+3:30 (IRST)
  - Summer (DST): UTC+4:30 (IRDT)

Tahaneh-ye Sofla (Persian: طهنه سفلي, also Romanized as Ţahaneh-ye Soflá and Ţahneh-ye Soflá) is a village in Sar Firuzabad Rural District, Firuzabad District, Kermanshah County, Kermanshah Province, Iran. At the 2006 census, its population was 82, in 18 families.
