= Ashbakh =

Village in Kermanshah province, Iran

Ashbakh Persian: اشباخ
- Village
- Location within Iran
- Coordinates: 33°57′58″N 47°14′37″E
- Country: Iran
- Province: Kermanshah
- County: Kermanshah
- District: Firuzabad
- Rural District: Osmanvand

Population (2016)
  - Total: 471
- Time zone: UTC+3:30 (IRST)

Ashbakh (Persian: اشباخ) (Note: Also romanized as Ashbākh) is a village in Osmanvand Rural District of Firuzabad District, Kermanshah County, Kermanshah province, Iran.

== Demographics ==
=== Population ===
At the time of the 2006 National Census, the village's population was 428 in 96 households. The following census in 2011 counted 471 people in 129 households. The 2016 census measured the population of the village as 471 people in 141 households. It was the most populous village in its rural district.
