= Sarv-e Nav-e Olya =

Sarv-e Nav-e Olya سرونوعليا
- Village
- Location within Iran
- Coordinates: 34°08′44″N 47°05′20″E
- Country: Iran
- Province: Kermanshah
- County: Kermanshah
- Bakhsh: Firuzabad
- Rural District: Sar Firuzabad

Population (2006)
  - Total: 553
- Time zone: UTC+3:30 (IRST)
  - Summer (DST): UTC+4:30 (IRDT)

Sarv-e Nav-e Olya (Persian: سرونوعليا, also Romanized as Sarv-e Nāv-e ‘Olyā) is a village in Sar Firuzabad Rural District, Firuzabad District, Kermanshah County, Kermanshah Province, Iran. At the 2006 census, its population was 553, in 121 families.
