= Sar Jub, Kermanshah =

Sar Jub سرجوب
- Village
- Location within Iran
- Coordinates: 33°51′44″N 47°07′58″E
- Country: Iran
- Province: Kermanshah
- County: Kermanshah
- Bakhsh: Firuzabad
- Rural District: Jalalvand

Population (2006)
  - Total: 263
- Time zone: UTC+3:30 (IRST)
  - Summer (DST): UTC+4:30 (IRDT)

Sar Jub (Persian: سرجوب, also Romanized as Sar Jūb; also known as Sar Jūb-e Jalāvand, Sar Jūb-e ‘Olyā, Sar Jūb-e Soflá, and Sarju Jalālwand) is a village in Jalalvand Rural District, Firuzabad District, Kermanshah County, Kermanshah Province, Iran. At the 2006 census, its population was 263, in 48 families.
