= Kalek-e Bayeh =

Kalek-e Bayeh کلک بایه
- Village
- Location within Iran
- Coordinates: 33°50′52″N 47°04′27″E
- Country: Iran
- Province: Kermanshah
- County: Kermanshah
- Bakhsh: Firuzabad
- Rural District: Osmanvand

Population (2006)
  - Total: 61
- Time zone: UTC+3:30 (IRST)
  - Summer (DST): UTC+4:30 (IRDT)

Kalek-e Bayeh (Persian: کلک بایه, also Romanized as Kalek-e Bāyeh; also known as Kalek, Kalek-e ‘Olyā, and Kalek-e Soflá) is a village in Osmanvand Rural District, Firuzabad District, Kermanshah County, Kermanshah Province, Iran. At the 2006 census, its population was 61, in 11 families.
