= Godar Pir-e Sofla =

Village in Kermanshah, Iran

Godar Pir-e Sofla گدارپيرسفلي
- Village
- Location within Iran
- Coordinates: 33°58′37″N 47°29′18″E
- Country: Iran
- Province: Kermanshah
- County: Kermanshah
- Bakhsh: Firuzabad
- Rural District: Sar Firuzabad

Population (2006)
  - Total: 201
- Time zone: UTC+3:30 (IRST)
  - Summer (DST): UTC+4:30 (IRDT)

Godar Pir-e Sofla (Persian: گدارپيرسفلي, also Romanized as Godār Pīr-e Soflá; also known as Godārpey-ye Soflá) is a village in Sar Firuzabad Rural District, Firuzabad District, Kermanshah County, Kermanshah Province, Iran. At the 2006 census, its population was 201, in 35 families.
