= Karvaneh-ye Sofla =

Village in Kermanshah, Iran

Karvaneh-ye Sofla كاروانه سفلي
- Village
- Location within Iran
- Coordinates: 34°06′57″N 47°05′35″E
- Country: Iran
- Province: Kermanshah
- County: Kermanshah
- Bakhsh: Firuzabad
- Rural District: Sar Firuzabad

Population (2006)
  - Total: 178
- Time zone: UTC+3:30 (IRST)
  - Summer (DST): UTC+4:30 (IRDT)

Karvaneh-ye Sofla (Persian: كاروانه سفلي, also Romanized as Kārvāneh-ye Soflá) is a village in Sar Firuzabad Rural District, Firuzabad District, Kermanshah County, Kermanshah Province, Iran. At the 2006 census, its population was 178, in 44 families.
