= Sekher-e Sofla =

Sekher-e Sofla سخرسفلي
- Village
- Location within Iran
- Coordinates: 34°03′48″N 47°16′39″E
- Country: Iran
- Province: Kermanshah
- County: Kermanshah
- Bakhsh: Firuzabad
- Rural District: Sar Firuzabad

Population (2006)
  - Total: 51
- Time zone: UTC+3:30 (IRST)
  - Summer (DST): UTC+4:30 (IRDT)

Sekher-e Sofla (Persian: سخرسفلي, also Romanized as Sekher-e Soflá) is a village in Sar Firuzabad Rural District, Firuzabad District, Kermanshah County, Kermanshah Province, Iran. At the 2006 census, its population was 51, in 11 families.
