= Cheshmeh Sorkh-e Qabr-e Baba =

Cheshmeh Sorkh-e Qabr-e Baba چشمه سرخ قبربابا
- Village
- Location within Iran
- Coordinates: 33°52′51″N 47°05′09″E
- Country: Iran
- Province: Kermanshah
- County: Kermanshah
- Bakhsh: Firuzabad
- Rural District: Jalalvand

Population (2006)
  - Total: 83
- Time zone: UTC+3:30 (IRST)
  - Summer (DST): UTC+4:30 (IRDT)

Cheshmeh Sorkh-e Qabr-e Baba (Persian: چشمه سرخ قبربابا, also Romanized as Cheshmeh Sorkh-e Qabr-e Bābā; also known as Cheshmeh Sorkh) is a village in Jalalvand Rural District, Firuzabad District, Kermanshah County, Kermanshah Province, Iran. At the 2006 census, its population was 83, in 14 families.
