= Khub Yaran-e Sofla =

Khub Yaran-e Sofla خوبياران سفلي
- Village
- Location within Iran
- Coordinates: 33°52′15″N 47°08′26″E
- Country: Iran
- Province: Kermanshah
- County: Kermanshah
- Bakhsh: Firuzabad
- Rural District: Jalalvand

Population (2006)
  - Total: 96
- Time zone: UTC+3:30 (IRST)
  - Summer (DST): UTC+4:30 (IRDT)

Khub Yaran-e Sofla (Persian: خوبياران سفلي, also Romanized as Khūb Yārān-e Soflá; also known as Khūb Yārān-e Pā’īn and Qanbar) is a village in Jalalvand Rural District, Firuzabad District, Kermanshah County, Kermanshah Province, Iran. At the 2006 census, its population was 96, in 18 families.
