= Porgoli-ye Olya =

Porgoli-ye Olya پرگلي عليا
- Village
- Location within Iran
- Coordinates: 33°52′22″N 47°00′47″E
- Country: Iran
- Province: Kermanshah
- County: Kermanshah
- Bakhsh: Firuzabad
- Rural District: Jalalvand

Population (2006)
  - Total: 101
- Time zone: UTC+3:30 (IRST)
  - Summer (DST): UTC+4:30 (IRDT)

Porgoli-ye Olya (Persian: پرگلي عليا, also Romanized as Porgolī-ye ‘Olyā; also known as Palkūlī) is a village in Jalalvand Rural District, Firuzabad District, Kermanshah County, Kermanshah Province, Iran. At the 2006 census, its population was 101, in 21 families.
