= Galk =

Galk or Galak (Persian: گلك) may refer to:

- Galk, Razavi Khorasan
- Galak, Sistan and Baluchestan
