= Poshteh Rizeh-ye Vosta =

Village in Kermanshah, Iran

Poshteh Rizeh-ye Vosta پشته ريزه وسطي
- Village
- Location within Iran
- Coordinates: 34°04′28″N 47°11′14″E
- Country: Iran
- Province: Kermanshah
- County: Kermanshah
- Bakhsh: Firuzabad
- Rural District: Sar Firuzabad

Population (2006)
  - Total: 103
- Time zone: UTC+3:30 (IRST)
  - Summer (DST): UTC+4:30 (IRDT)

Poshteh Rizeh-ye Vosta (Persian: پشته ريزه وسطي, also Romanized as Poshteh Rīzeh-ye Vosţá) is a village in Sar Firuzabad Rural District, Firuzabad District, Kermanshah County, Kermanshah Province, Iran. At the 2006 census, its population was 103, in 20 families.
