= Gerdakan Dar-e Olya =

Gerdakan Dar-e Olya گردكاندارعليا
- Village
- Country: Iran
- Province: Kermanshah
- County: Kermanshah
- Bakhsh: Firuzabad
- Rural District: Sar Firuzabad

Population (2006)
  - Total: 82
- Time zone: UTC+3:30 (IRST)
  - Summer (DST): UTC+4:30 (IRDT)

Gerdakan Dar-e Olya (Persian: گردكاندارعليا, also Romanized as Gerdakān Dār-e ‘Olyā) is a village in Sar Firuzabad Rural District, Firuzabad District, Kermanshah County, Kermanshah Province, Iran. At the 2006 census, its population was 82, in 14 families.
