= Cheshmeh Gach =

Village in Kermanshah province, Iran

Cheshmeh Gach Persian: چشمه گچ
- Village
- Location within Iran
- Coordinates: 33°59′01″N 46°59′50″E
- Country: Iran
- Province: Kermanshah
- County: Kermanshah
- District: Firuzabad
- Rural District: Jalalvand

Population (2016)
  - Total: 477
- Time zone: UTC+3:30 (IRST)

Cheshmeh Gach (Persian: چشمه گچ) (Note: Also romanized as Cheshmehgach) is a village in Jalalvand Rural District of Firuzabad District, Kermanshah County, Kermanshah province, Iran.

== Demographics ==
=== Population ===
At the time of the 2006 National Census, the village's population was 596 in 123 households. The following census in 2011 counted 529 people in 132 households. The 2016 census measured the population of the village as 477 people in 131 households. It was the most populous village in its rural district.
