= Karvaneh-ye Olya =

Karvaneh-ye Olya كاروانه عليا
- Village
- Location within Iran
- Coordinates: 34°06′47″N 47°05′59″E
- Country: Iran
- Province: Kermanshah
- County: Kermanshah
- Bakhsh: Firuzabad
- Rural District: Sar Firuzabad

Population (2006)
  - Total: 68
- Time zone: UTC+3:30 (IRST)
  - Summer (DST): UTC+4:30 (IRDT)

Karvaneh-ye Olya (Persian: كاروانه عليا, also Romanized as Kārvāneh-ye ‘Olyā) is a village in Sar Firuzabad Rural District, Firuzabad District, Kermanshah County, Kermanshah Province, Iran. At the 2006 census, its population was 68, in 14 families.
