= Sorkh Cheshmeh =

Sorkh Cheshmeh (Persian: سرخ چشمه) may refer to:

- Sorkh Cheshmeh, North Khorasan

== See also ==
- Cheshmeh Sorkh (disambiguation)
