= Gerdakan Dar-e Sofla =

Gerdakan Dar-e Sofla گردكاندارسفلي
- Village
- Location within Iran
- Coordinates: 33°58′56″N 47°23′52″E
- Country: Iran
- Province: Kermanshah
- County: Kermanshah
- Bakhsh: Firuzabad
- Rural District: Sar Firuzabad

Population (2006)
  - Total: 109
- Time zone: UTC+3:30 (IRST)
  - Summer (DST): UTC+4:30 (IRDT)

Gerdakan Dar-e Sofla (Persian: گردكاندارسفلي, also Romanized as Gerdakān Dār-e Soflá; also known as Gerdakān Dār, Gerdā Kāndār, and Gerdeh Kāndār) is a village in Sar Firuzabad Rural District, Firuzabad District, Kermanshah County, Kermanshah Province, Iran. At the 2006 census, its population was 109, in 20 families.
