= Jelow-e Sofla =

Village in Kermanshah, Iran

Jelow-e Sofla جلوسفلي
- Village
- Location within Iran
- Coordinates: 34°12′06″N 47°01′37″E
- Country: Iran
- Province: Kermanshah
- County: Kermanshah
- Bakhsh: Firuzabad
- Rural District: Sar Firuzabad

Population (2006)
  - Total: 148
- Time zone: UTC+3:30 (IRST)
  - Summer (DST): UTC+4:30 (IRDT)

Jelow-e Sofla (Persian: جلوسفلي, also Romanized as Jelow-e Soflá; also known as Chalāu and Jelow) is a village in Sar Firuzabad Rural District, Firuzabad District, Kermanshah County, Kermanshah Province, Iran. At the 2006 census, its population was 148, in 30 families.
