= Kolak =

Kolak may refer to:

- Kolak (food), an Indonesian dessert
- Kolak River, a river in Gujarat, India
- Daniel Kolak (born 1955), Croatian-American philosopher
- Dorota Kolak (born 1957), Polish actress and professor
- Rudi Kolak (1918–2004), Yugoslav and Bosnian communist politician
- Sara Kolak (born 1995), Croatian javelin thrower
- Vasilije Kolak (born 1995), Bosnian footballer
- Kolak, Çameli, a settlement in Denizli Province, Turkey
- Kolak, a title used by the rulers of Wadai in central Africa
