= Hans Rose =

German U-boat commander (1885–1969)

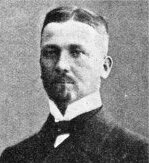
- Hans Rose before World War I
- Born: 15 April 1885; Berlin-Charlottenburg, German Empire
- Died: 6 December 1969 (aged 84); Essen, West Germany
- Military career
- Allegiance: German Empire; Nazi Germany
- Branch: Imperial German Navy; Kriegsmarine
- Rank: Kapitän zur See
- Commands: U-2; U-53, April 22, 1917 – August 17, 1918
- Conflicts: U-boat Campaign (World War I)
- Awards: Pour le Mérite

Hans Rose (April 18, 1885 – December 6, 1969) was one of the most successful and highly decorated German U-boat commanders in the Kaiserliche Marine during World War 1.

In addition to the American destroyer USS Jacob Jones, he sank either 80 merchant ships totalling 230,051 gross register tons (GRT) or 81 merchant ships totalling 220,892 GRT and damaged another nine.

== Early life ==
Johann ‘Hans” Eduard Friedrich Rose was born in the Charlottenburg district of Berlin on 15 April 1885, the third of five children of Marie Louise “Lilli” (nee Kroseberg) and Heinrich Otto Ludwig Rose. His father was the Director General of the European division of the Germania Insurance Company of New York. He spent his childhood in Berlin and was educated at the Kaiserin-Augusta Gymnasium in Charlottenburg between 1896 and 1902.

== Joins the imperial German Navy ==
On 1 April 1903 the 18 year old Rose joined the Kaiserliche Marine (Imperial German Navy) as a Seekadett (junior sea cadet). Following basic training he completed his sea training on the officer training sailing ship SMS Stein, returning to Germany in the spring of 1904 to promotion to Fähnrich zur See (sea cadet) on 15 April 1904 to complete a year of onshore academic training at the Navy Academy. Following its completion he was posted to the pre-dreadnought battleship SMS Hessen, where on 28 September 1906 he was promoted to Fähnrich zur See (lieutenant). He then served on the training cruiser SMS Freya and finally as watch officer on the pre-dreadnought battleship SMS Wettin. On 15 July 1908, Rose was promoted to Oberleutnant zur See (first lieutenant). He was briefly an instructor on the torpedo training ship SMS Württemberg and from 1912 to 1913 first officer on the SMS Loreley stationed in Constantinople.

In the early summer of 1913 Rose was posted back to Germany where he was initially assigned as First Officer on torpedo boat SMS V157 before in October 1913 being given command of torpedo boat SMS S15, which was part of the Seventh Torpedo Boat Flotilla, which was commanded by Gottlieb von Koch. On 14 July 1914 Rose was promoted to Kapitänleutnant (Lieutenant Commander).

== World War I ==
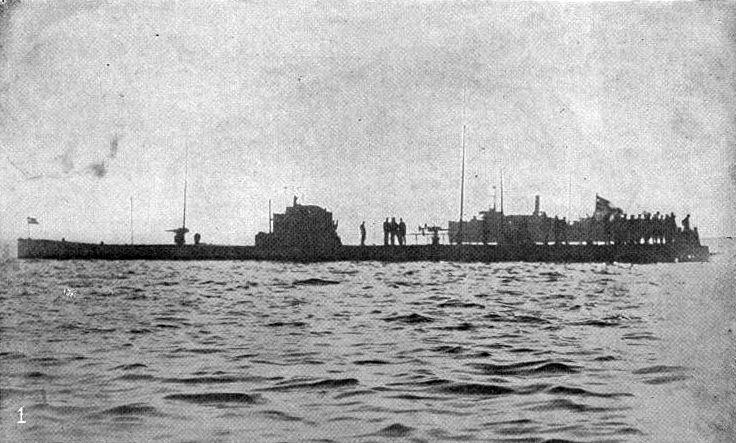
U-53

Rose initially spent the early years of the war in command of S15, until in April 1915 he requested a transfer to the submarine service. He immediately began seven months of study at the Ubootschule (U-boat Forces School). Upon his graduation on 5 November 1915 he was so highly thought of, that he remained as a tutor at the Ubootschule with command of training submarine U 2. In 1916 he left the school to take command of on 22 April 1916 and commission the newly-built U-53, which had been newly built by Krupp Germania shipyard. After sea trials found no defects the submarine passed through the Kiel Canal on 30 May to reach the naval base at Helgoland the following day.

In September 1916, Rose brought U-53 to Newport, Rhode Island, to the surprise of American authorities. He proceeded to dock and then invite American naval officers and their wives aboard to view his vessel. After delivering a message to the German Ambassador he proceeded offshore to the lightship Nantucket. He sent five or six ships to the bottom, after questioning their captains on their cargo and ordering the abandonment of their ships.

=== Sinking of SS Housatonic ===
On 3 February 1917 U-53 captured and scuttled SS Housatonic about 20 nautical miles (37 km) southwest of Bishop Rock, Isles of Scilly. At the time the USA was still neutral and reacted cautiously to Housatonic's sinking. The New York Times noted the courtesy and propriety with which Rose had applied the rules of war. The US Government did not regard Housatonic's sinking as a casus belli. Her sinking however contributed to increasing diplomatic tension that eventually led the US to declare war on Germany.

On March 11, 1917, Rose, still in command of U-53, torpedoed and sank the 6705 ton Cunard Liner RMS Folia.

=== Sinking of USS Jacob Jones ===
On December 6, 1917, Rose torpedoed and sank USS Jacob Jones, the first American destroyer lost in the First World War. The torpedo hit Jacob Jones at 3,000 yards (2,700 m), the longest successful torpedo shot on record at the time.

On 8 July 1918 while off the Norwegian coast and two days out from its base at Helgoland U-53 answered a distress call from U-86 which had hit a mine and as a result had lost all of its diesel fuel. Meeting with the damaged submarine U-53 transferred fuel to it and provided further assistance until it was relieved by surface vessels.

On 10 July 1918 U-53 returned to port having completed its fifteenth mission under Rose. Rose then went on a month long leave with his wife in Berchtesgaden, returning to duty on 10 August at Wilhelmshaven to find that he had been replaced as commander of U-53 by Otto von Schrader. During his 810 days as commander of U-53 he had spent 290 days at sea. U-53 was later surrendered to the Royal Navy at Harwich on 1 December 1918.

Rose was informed that he was being assigned to a position as a staff officer to Hermann Bauer, with the intention that he would later take command in December 1918 of a new submarine currently being developed.

== Between the two wars ==
Following the Armistice of 11 November 1918, Rose was appointed chief of the 2nd U-boat Half-Fleet to handle affairs until 28 December 1918. On 5 February 1919, Rose was placed at the disposal of the North Sea Naval Station. Despite being invited by Admiral Adolf von Trotha to remain to in the navy, the 33 year old Rose elected to leave the navy on 24 November 1919, with the rank of Korvettenkapitän (Corvette Captain).

Initially he took a role at the Marine Offiziers Hilfe (Navy Officers Aid) organization which assisted members into work with civilian organizations and companies before deciding to use a small inheritance to attend engineering design courses at the Technische Hoschschule in Charlottenburg. Hs wife took a secretarial job to support the family. By November 1919 the couple's finances had deteriorated to such a level that Rose gave up his studies and via an introduction from Beno Goldschmidt, a former crew member on U-53 Rose obtained a business apprenticeship at his father Karl’s company the chemical manufacturer, Theodor Goldschmidt A.G. in Essen. His wife remained behind in Berlin, while Rose boarded in the Goldschmidt’s attic, before they found a suitable apartment. Rose worked his way up to clerk before taking on the role of private secretary for Dr Karl Goldschmidt and assets manager for the Goldschmidt family trust and its representative on the company’s management board.

During the occupation of the Ruhr in 1923, while travelling to visit family Rose was briefly retained by Belgian-French occupation troops on the suspicion of being a German military officer during which he received a bayonet wound in the back, which required treatment in a military hospital. Once details of his confinement became public, various officials intervened on his behalf the charges were dropped. He then spent four weeks recuperating in the Obersalzberg German navy hospital near Berchtesgaden. In 1924 he resigned as position as secretary and asset manager and took up the Goldschmidt family offer to run Kondor Works, a small woodworking company that they owned in Lemgo. Rose struggled to make the company profitable and recommended that the family close it down, which they didn’t accept. His situation changed in early 1926 when Karl Goldschmidt died and he was asked by the Goldschmidt heirs to return to Essen, where he worked in various management roles in the company’s newly created lead division for the next 13 years.

With war approaching he resigned from Theodor Goldschmidt A.G. on 30 June 1939 and a month later was remobilized.

== World War II ==
Before the start of World War II, Rose was placed at the disposal of the Kriegsmarine on 24 May 1939, but without being assigned to a position. On 27 August 1939, the so-called Tannenberg Day, he was given the rank of Fregattenkapitän (Frigate Captain). As such, Rose briefly worked at the Armaments Inspection VI in Münster and was transferred to Kraków in newly occupied Poland on 1 October 1939 in what is assumed to be a liaison role with the Wehrwirtschaftskommando (Defense Economic Command).

Upon his return he was briefly on the staff of the Befehlshaber der U-Boote (Commander of Submarines), before in February 1940 he took up the position of Kommandeur der Unterseebootsausbildungsabteilung (commander of the 1st Submarine Training Division) based at Plön. In this role he was responsible for development and commissioning of submarine crews, the final stage of their training prior to posting to a submarine.

On 30 April 1940 he left this role when he was posted to German occupied Norway where he spent May and June 1940 as Chief of Staff to August Thiele, the Commanding Officer for coastal defence of Trondheim. Following August Thiel’s promotion to Rear Admiral in charge of the Northern Coast of Norway, Rose on 1 July 1940 took over his vacated position as sea commander at Trondheim. In this role he was responsible for its sea defence of Germany’s ninth most important submarine base and a flotilla of patrol boats. Among his first tasks was to construct a heavy gun battery on an island at the entrance to Trondheim fjord. During his time there 53 U-boats used its facilities, with Dora-1 Germany’s largest naval base in Northem Norway completed in 1943 two months prior to his departure. the 13th U-boat Flortilla based there from June 1943 On 1 July 1942 he was promoted to the rank of Kapitän zur See (Vessel Captain). Following the death of his wife earlier in the year Rose was allowed to give up his post in Trondheim and on 7 May 1943 he was placed at the disposal of the naval station in the Baltic Sea. He was allowed retire from the Navy on 31 July 1943 based on his claim that he needed to take care of his children.

Following his return from Norway Rose was employed in a civilian role with the government based at Siemens facility at Wuppertal assisting in expediting the production of armaments at Krupp and Siemens. He remained employed in this role until the end of the war. At the end of 1944 the local Nazi party made him commander of Essen-Heisingen’s Volksturm units, but later resigned and refused to participate after he came to the conclusion that its deployment was wrong and criminal, as it was neither organised or controlled by the German army.

== Post war ==
Rose died in his sleep in his home at the age of 84 on 6 December 1969. He received a military funeral with an honour guard made up of four officers of the Bundesmarine. Among those attending were Walther Forstmann, representing the knighthood of the order of Pour le Mérite and Rear Admiral Hermann Boehm.

== Personal life ==
At the age of 28 Rose married 20 year old Anne-Marie Siemers in St. Mariens church in Flensburg on 20 September 1913. The couple had four children, Heinz Viktor, born on 18 July 1920; Gerd, born on 13 February 1925; Helga, born on 8 October 1920 and Christian Songenfrei, born on 2 February 1930. Anne-Mare died of cancer on 3 January 1943. After serving with German Army in France, Norway, Yugoslavia and Italy Heinz Viktor Rose was killed on the Eastern Front in 1944.

On 29 January 1949 the now 63 year old Rose married 44 year old widow Theodora Brügmann Brickenstein, who bought her five children to the relationship, Rudolf, Peter, Karolina, Wilhelm Rolf-Jürgen and Hans-Joachim.

== Honours ==
On 20 December 1917 Rose was awarded the Pour le Mérite. He was also awarded the Ritterkreuz des Hohenzollerschen Hausordens mit Schwertern (Knights Cross of the Hohenzollern House Order with Swords).
