= Sar Jub-e Qaleh Masgareh =

Village in Kermanshah province, Iran

Sar Jub-e Qaleh Masgareh Persian: سرجوب قلعه مسگره
- Village
- Location within Iran
- Coordinates: 33°57′08″N 47°09′31″E
- Country: Iran
- Province: Kermanshah
- County: Kermanshah
- District: Firuzabad
- Rural District: Osmanvand

Population (2016)
  - Total: 160
- Time zone: UTC+3:30 (IRST)

Sar Jub-e Qaleh Masgareh (Persian: سرجوب قلعه مسگره) (Note: Also romanized as Sar Jūb-e Qal‘eh Masgareh; also known as Sar Jūb and Sarjūb-e Soflá) is a village in, and the former capital of, Osmanvand Rural District of Firuzabad District, Kermanshah County, Kermanshah province, Iran. The capital of the rural district has been transferred to the village of Anjab-e Buzhan.

== Demographics ==
=== Population ===
At the time of the 2006 National Census, the village's population was 284 in 57 households. The following census in 2011 counted 165 people in 42 households. The 2016 census measured the population of the village as 160 people in 42 households.
