= Sarv-e Nav-e Sofla =

Village in Kermanshah province, Iran

Sarv-e Nav-e Sofla Persian: سرو نو سفلي
- Village
- Location within Iran
- Coordinates: 34°08′50″N 47°05′09″E
- Country: Iran
- Province: Kermanshah
- County: Kermanshah
- District: Firuzabad
- Rural District: Sar Firuzabad

Population (2016)
  - Total: 694
- Time zone: UTC+3:30 (IRST)

Sarv-e Nav-e Sofla (Persian: سرونوسفلي) (Note: Also romanized as Sarv-e Nāv-e Soflá and Sarv-e Now-ye Soflá; also known as Sarv Now, Sarv-e Now, Sarwanow, and Sirvanu) is a village in Sar Firuzabad Rural District of Firuzabad District, Kermanshah County, Kermanshah province, Iran.

== Demographics ==
=== Population ===
At the time of the 2006 National Census, the village's population was 615 in 138 households. The following census in 2011 counted 1,749 people in 220 households. The 2016 census measured the population of the village as 694 people in 190 households. It was the most populous village in its rural district.
