= USS Kalk (DD-611) =

Benson-class destroyer

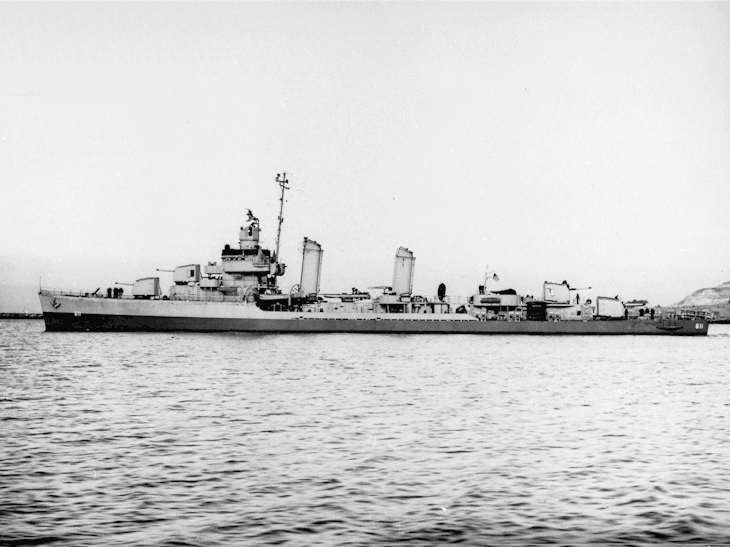
- USS Kalk (DD-611) off Mare Island in December 1942

History

United States
- Name: USS Kalk (DD-611)
- Namesake: Stanton Frederick Kalk
- Builder: Bethlehem Shipbuilding Corporation, San Francisco, California
- Laid down: 30 June 1941
- Launched: 18 July 1942
- Commissioned: 17 October 1942
- Decommissioned: 3 May 1946
- Stricken: June 1968
- Fate: Sunk as a target in March 1969

General characteristics
- Class & type: Benson-class destroyer
- Displacement: 1,620 tons
- Length: 348 ft 4 in (106.17 m)
- Beam: 36 ft 1 in (11.00 m)
- Draught: 11 ft 9 in (3.58 m)
- Speed: 37.5 knots (69.5 km/h)
- Complement: 258
- Armament: 4 x 5 in (130 mm)/38 guns, 4 x 40 mm., 7 x 20 mm., 5 x 21 inch (533 mm) tt, 6 dcp., 2 dct.

USS Kalk (DD-611) was a Benson-class destroyer in the United States Navy during World War II. She was the second ship named for Lieutenant Stanton Frederick Kalk.

Kalk was laid down 30 June 1941 by the Bethlehem Steel Corporation, San Francisco, California; launched 18 July 1942; sponsored by Mrs. Flora Stanton Kalk, mother of Lieutenant Kalk; and commissioned 17 October.

== Service history ==
Following shakedown along the California coast, Kalk departed San Francisco 28 December for patrol and escort duty in the Aleutian Islands. Steaming via Dutch Harbor, she arrived Adak 9 January and patrolled from Adak to Amchitka Island. On the 16th, she embarked 185 survivors of Arthur Middleton and Worden which had foundered in an Arctic storm. She transported them to Adak, then continued intermittent patrols until she sailed 26 February for home, arriving San Francisco 4 March.

After repairs, Kalk steamed from San Francisco 7 April and proceeded via the Panama Canal to New York, where she arrived a fortnight later for Atlantic convoy escort duty. She cleared New York 28 April, and the next day joined a 35-ship convoy, UGF-8, headed for Oran, Algeria. Arriving 12 May, she searched for a suspected U-boat. The destroyer departed Casablanca, French Morocco, 19 May escorting a westbound convoy. Arriving New York 31 May, she sailed 13 June via Casco Bay, Maine, and NS Argentia, Newfoundland, to Norfolk for further convoy-escort duty. From 27 June to 6 December she escorted three convoys between the United States and North Africa. After overhaul at New York and Boston, she arrived Norfolk 29 December and then sailed 2 January 1944 for the Pacific.

She departed Balboa, Canal Zone, 8 January with DesDiv 38, escorting New Jersey and Iowa. Reaching Funafuti, Ellice Islands 27 January, Kalk searched for downed fighter planes before sailing for New Guinea 31 January to join the 7th Fleet at Milne Bay 7 February. She operated in the New Guinea area, primarily on patrol and convoy escort duty, until 12 June. During the protracted struggle for New Guinea, she also covered amphibious invasions, bombarding Manus, Pityilu, Los Negros, and Rambutye Islands, Admiralties: Tanahmerah Bay and Wakde-Sarmi, New Guinea; and Biak and Owi, Schouten Islands.

After providing fire support during the invasion of Biak Island 27 May, Kalk continued escort and picket duty between Biak and Humboldt Bay. While on patrol 12 June off the southern coast of Biak, an enemy plane dived out of the sun and released a bomb which struck abaft her forward stack at the base of her starboard torpedo tubes. As Kalk's 20 mm gunfire downed the attacker, the bomb exploded the air flasks of her torpedoes, destroying several 20 mm guns, showering her crew with shrapnel, and damaging her superstructure amidships. Though suffering 70 casualties, her crew rallied to save the destroyer. Firefighters extinguished each blaze; and, while other hands tended the wounded, volunteers detached the warheads from torpedoes scattered about the deck.

The only Allied ship seriously damaged in more than 2 weeks of repeated air attacks at and near Biak, Kalk retired to Hollandia, New Guinea, for emergency repairs and sailed 20 June via the Admiralties and Pearl Harbor for the United States. Reaching San Francisco 31 July, she received complete repairs and underwent alteration at Mare Island Naval Shipyard.

Then the destroyer departed 26 October for Pearl Harbor, arriving 1 November. On 12 November she headed via Eniwetok to Ulithi, Western Carolines, where she arrived 26 November to resume her duty in the western Pacific.

For more than 8 months Kalk operated out of Ulithi on anti-submarine warfare patrols screening sea logistics forces during offensive operations from Luzon to Okinawa. From 16 to 23 December she patrolled northeast of Luzon during replenishment of the 3rd Fleet. Sailing from Ulithi 29 December, she screened supply units which supported TF 38 during the crucial Lingayen Gulf operations on western Luzon. She continued this duty until returning to Ulithi 27 January 1945.

As a unit of DesDiv 38, Kalk rendezvoused with TG 50.8 on 18 February for refueling and replenishment operations of TF 58 during the campaign on Iwo Jima. Returning to Ulithi 6 March, she sailed northward 13 March with TG 50.8 to screen logistic support for the 5th Fleet which was then clearing Ryūkyū waters of Japanese shipping and aircraft in preparation for the invasion of Okinawa 1 April. From then to the end of the war, Kalk operated with the 5th and 3rd Fleets off the Ryūkyūs as escort, plane guard, and ASW screen. Concerned primarily with screening supply ships between Ulithi and Okinawa, she destroyed numerous Japanese mines during patrols. While steaming for Okinawa 5 June with logistic support group TG 30.8, she passed through a raging typhoon with destructive winds of more than 90 knots. Suffering only minor damage, Kalk continued screening patrols. When the war ended 15 August, she was steaming from Okinawa to Ulithi.

Departing Ulithi 20 August, Kalk sailed via Saipan and Okinawa to Japan, arriving Tokyo Bay 1 September escorting Detroit. Present at the formal Japanese surrender 2 September, she departed the 3rd on an escort run to Eniwetok. After returning to Tokyo Bay 16 September, she departed for the United States 12 October via the Philippines, Eniwetok, and Pearl Harbor. Reaching San Diego 17 November, she proceeded on the 17th for the East Coast, arriving Boston 11 December. After overhaul, she departed Boston 18 January 1946 and arrived Charleston, South Carolina on the 20th. Kalk decommissioned at Charleston 3 May 1946, entered the Atlantic Reserve Fleet at Orange, Texas. Kalk was stricken from the Naval Vessel Register in June 1968. She was sunk as a target in March 1969.

== Awards ==
Kalk received eight battle stars for World War II service.
