= Zaneylan-e Olya =

Zaneylan-e Olya زنيلان عليا
- Village
- Location within Iran
- Coordinates: 34°00′18″N 47°03′24″E
- Country: Iran
- Province: Kermanshah
- County: Kermanshah
- Bakhsh: Firuzabad
- Rural District: Jalalvand

Population (2006)
  - Total: 181
- Time zone: UTC+3:30 (IRST)
  - Summer (DST): UTC+4:30 (IRDT)

Zaneylan-e Olya (Persian: زنيلان عليا, also Romanized as Zaneylān-e ‘Olyā; also known as Zeynalān-e ‘Olyā) is a village in Jalalvand Rural District, Firuzabad District, Kermanshah County, Kermanshah Province, Iran. At the 2006 census, its population was 181, in 40 families.
