= Halashi, Iran =

City in Kermanshah province, Iran

Halashi Persian: هلشی
- City
- Location within Iran
- Coordinates: 34°06′39″N 47°05′24″E
- Country: Iran
- Province: Kermanshah
- County: Kermanshah
- District: Firuzabad

Population (2016)
  - Total: 804
- Time zone: UTC+3:30 (IRST)

Halashi (Persian: هلشی) (Note: Also romanized as Halashī) is a city in, and the capital of, Firuzabad District of Kermanshah County, Kermanshah province, Iran. It also serves as the administrative center for Sar Firuzabad Rural District.

== Demographics ==
=== Population ===
At the time of the 2006 National Census, the city's population was 457 in 114 households. The following census in 2011 counted 769 people in 201 households. The 2016 census measured the population of the city as 804 people in 233 households.
