= Zaneylan-e Sofla =

Zaneylan-e Sofla زنيلان سفلي
- Village
- Location within Iran
- Coordinates: 34°00′25″N 47°03′30″E
- Country: Iran
- Province: Kermanshah
- County: Kermanshah
- Bakhsh: Firuzabad
- Rural District: Jalalvand

Population (2006)
  - Total: 109
- Time zone: UTC+3:30 (IRST)
  - Summer (DST): UTC+4:30 (IRDT)

Zaneylan-e Sofla (Persian: زنيلان سفلي, also Romanized as Zaneylān-e Soflá; also known as Zeynalān-e Pā’īn) is a village in Jalalvand Rural District, Firuzabad District, Kermanshah County, Kermanshah Province, Iran. At the 2006 census, its population was 109, in 23 families.
