= USS Jacob Jones (DD-61) =

American Tucker-class destroyer

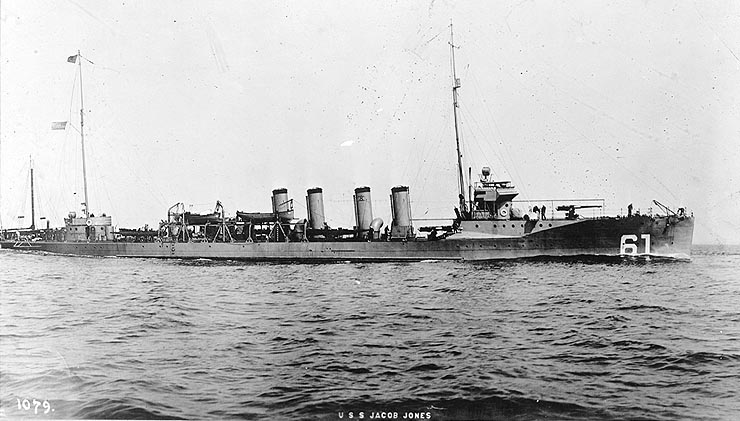
- USS Jacob Jones (DD-61)

History

United States
- Name: USS Jacob Jones
- Namesake: Jacob Jones
- Ordered: 1913
- Builder: New York Shipbuilding; Camden, New Jersey
- Yard number: 150
- Laid down: 3 August 1914
- Launched: 29 May 1915
- Sponsored by: Mrs. Jerome Parker Crittenden
- Commissioned: 10 February 1916
- Identification: DD-61
- Fate: Sunk, 6 December 1917

General characteristics
- Class & type: Tucker-class destroyer
- Displacement: 1,060 long tons (1,080 t); 1,205 long tons (1,224 t) fully loaded
- Length: 315 ft 3 in (96.09 m)
- Beam: 30 ft 6 in (9.30 m)
- Draft: 9 ft 8 in (2.95 m)
- Propulsion: 2 × screw propellers; 2 × Curtis geared steam turbines, 17,000 shp (13,000 kW); 4 × Yarrow boilers
- Speed: 30 knots (56 km/h; 35 mph)
- Complement: 99 officers and enlisted
- Armament: 4 × 4 in (102 mm)/50 guns; 8 × 21-inch (533 mm) torpedo tubes

USS Jacob Jones (Destroyer No. 61/DD-61) (Note: The United States Navy's hull classification system—in which Jacob Jones would have been designated DD-61—was not implemented until July 1920. Even though Jacob Jones was never known as DD-61 while afloat, many reference works nevertheless extend the system and refer to the ship by what her designation would have been, had she survived the war.) was a Tucker-class destroyer built for the United States Navy prior to the American entry into World War I. The ship was the first U.S. Navy vessel named in honor of Jacob Jones.

Jacob Jones was laid down by the New York Shipbuilding of Camden, New Jersey, in August 1914 and launched in May of the following year. The ship was a little more than 315 feet (96 m) in length, just over 30 feet (9.1 m) abeam, and had a standard displacement of 1,090 long tons (1,110 t). She was armed with four 4-inch (10 cm) guns and had eight 21-inch (533 mm) torpedo tubes. Jacob Jones was powered by a pair of steam turbines that propelled her at up to 30 knots (56 km/h; 35 mph).

After her February 1916 commissioning, Jacob Jones conducted patrols off the New England coast. After the United States entered World War I in April 1917, Jacob Jones was sent overseas. Patrolling the Irish Sea out of Queenstown, Ireland, Jacob Jones rescued the survivors of several ships, picking up over 300 from the sunken armed merchant cruiser Orama.

On 6 December, Jacob Jones was steaming independently from Brest, France, for Queenstown, when she was torpedoed and sunk by the German submarine U-53 with the loss of 66 men, becoming the first United States destroyer sunk by enemy action. Jacob Jones sank in eight minutes without issuing a distress call; the German submarine commander, Kapitänleutnant Hans Rose, after taking two badly injured Jacob Jones crewmen aboard his submarine, radioed the U.S. base at Queenstown with the coordinates for the survivors. The Veterans of Foreign Wars post in Dedham, Massachusetts is named for the ship.

== Design and construction ==
Jacob Jones was authorized in 1913 as the fifth ship of the Tucker class which, like the related O'Brien class, was an improved version of the Cassin-class destroyers authorized in 1911. Construction of the vessel was awarded to New York Shipbuilding of Camden, New Jersey, which laid down her keel on 3 August 1914. Ten months later, on 29 May 1915, Jacob Jones was launched by sponsor Mrs. Jerome Parker Crittenden (née Paulina Cazenove Jones), a great-granddaughter of the ship's namesake, Commodore Jacob Jones (1768–1850), a U.S. Navy officer during the War of 1812. As built, Jacob Jones was 315 feet 3 inches (96.09 m) in length and 30 feet 6 inches (9.30 m) abeam and drew 9 feet 8 inches (2.95 m). The ship had a standard displacement of 1,060 long tons (1,080 t) and displaced 1,205 long tons (1,224 t) when fully loaded.

Jacob Jones had two Curtis steam turbines that drove her two screw propellers, and an additional steam turbine geared to one of the propeller shafts for cruising purposes. The power plant could generate 17,000 shaft horsepower (13,000 kW) and move the ship at speeds up to 30 knots (56 km/h; 35 mph).

Jacob Jones' main battery consisted of four 4-inch (102 mm)/50 Mark 9 guns, (Note: The 50 denotes the length of the gun barrels; in this case, the gun is 50 calibers, meaning that the barrel is 50 times as long as its bore diameter, 200 inches (5.1 m) in this case. The Mark number is the version of the gun; in this case, the ninth U.S. Navy design of the 4-inch/50 gun.) with each gun weighing in excess of 6,100 pounds (2,800 kg). The guns fired 33-pound (15 kg) armor-piercing projectiles at 2,900 feet per second (880 m/s). At an elevation of 20°, the guns had a range of 15,920 yards (14,560 m).

Jacob Jones was also equipped with eight 21-inch (533 mm) torpedo tubes. The General Board of the United States Navy had called for two anti-aircraft guns for the Tucker-class ships, as well as provisions for laying up to 36 floating mines. From sources, it is unclear if these recommendations were followed for Jacob Jones or any of the other ships of the class.

== United States Navy career ==
USS Jacob Jones was commissioned into the United States Navy on 10 February 1916 under the command of Lieutenant Commander William S. Pye. Following her commissioning, Jacob Jones conducted training exercises off the New England coast, and then entered the Philadelphia Navy Yard for repairs. On 3 February 1917, the day the United States broke diplomatic relations with Germany, the ship nearly sank in the naval yard. Contemporary reports said it might have been an act of sabotage. Upon the United States' entry into World War I on 6 April 1917, Jacob Jones patrolled off the coast of Virginia. She sailed from Boston for Europe on 7 May with a group of destroyers that included Cassin, and arrived at Queenstown, Ireland, on 17 May.

Jacob Jones' duties at Queenstown involved patrolling and escorting convoys in the Irish Sea and making occasional rescues of survivors of sunken ships. On 8 July, Valetta was torpedoed by the German submarine U-87 some 120 nautical miles (220 km; 140 mi) west of Fastnet Rock; Jacob Jones arrived on the scene and picked up 44 survivors of the British steamship. While escorting the British steamship Dafila two weeks later, lookouts on Jacob Jones sighted a periscope, but before the destroyer could make an attack on the submarine, U-45 torpedoed and sank the steamship. Jacob Jones was able to recover 26 of Dafila's 28-member crew after the ship went down.

On 19 October, the British armed merchant cruiser Orama and ten destroyers, including Jacob Jones, were escorting an eastbound convoy of twenty steamers, when the German submarine U-62 surfaced in the midst of the group. The submarine launched her only remaining torpedo at Orama, sinking that vessel. While sister ship Conyngham saw and depth charged U-62 (to no avail), Jacob Jones turned her attentions to rescuing Orama's survivors, gathering 309.

== Sinking ==
In early December, Jacob Jones helped escort a convoy to Brest, France, with five other Queenstown-based destroyers. The last to depart from Brest on the return to Ireland, Jacob Jones was steaming alone in a zig-zag pattern when she was spotted by Kapitänleutnant Hans Rose on the German submarine U-53. At 16:20 on 6 December 1917, near position 49°23′N 6°13′W, lookouts on Jacob Jones spotted a torpedo 800 yards (730 m) distant headed for the ship's starboard side. Despite having her rudder put hard left and emergency speed rung up, Jacob Jones was unable to move out of the way, and the torpedo struck her rudder. Even though her depth charges did not explode, Jacob Jones was adrift. The jolt had knocked out power, so the destroyer was unable to send a distress signal; since she was steaming alone, no other ship was present to know of Jacob Jones' predicament.

Commander David W. Bagley, the destroyer's commander, ordered all life rafts and boats launched. As the ship sank, her bow raised in the air almost vertically before she began to slip beneath the waves. At this point the armed depth charges began to explode, killing men who had been unable to escape the destroyer, and stunning many others in the water. The destroyer, the first United States destroyer ever lost to enemy action, sank eight minutes after the torpedo struck the rudder, taking with her two officers and 64 ratings.

Several of the crew—most notably Lieutenant, Junior Grade, Stanton F. Kalk, the officer-of-the-deck when the torpedo struck—began to get men out of the water and into the life rafts. Kalk worked in the cold Atlantic water to equalize the load among the various rafts, but died of exhaustion and exposure.

Bagley noted in his official account that about 30 minutes after Jacob Jones sank, the German submarine surfaced about two to three miles (3.2 to 4.8 km) from the collection of rafts and took one of the American sailors on board. According to Uboat.net, what Rose of U-53 had done was surface and take aboard two badly injured American sailors. Rose had also radioed the American base at Queenstown with the approximate coordinates of the sinking before departing the area.

Bagley, unaware of Rose's humanitarian gesture, left most of the food, water, and medical supplies with Lieutenant Commander John K. Richards, whom he left in charge of the assembled rafts. Bagley, Lieutenant Commander Norman Scott (Jacob Jones' executive officer) and four crewmen (brought along to row), set out for aid in the nearby Isles of Scilly. At 13:00 on 7 December, Bagley's group was sighted by a British patrol vessel just six nautical miles (11 km; 6.9 mi) from their destination. The group was relieved to find that the British sloop HMS Camellia had found and taken aboard most of the survivors earlier that morning; a small group had been rescued on the night of the sinking by the American steamer Catalina.

Several men were recognized for their actions in the aftermath of the torpedo attack. Kalk (posthumously) and Bagley received the Navy Distinguished Service Medal. Others honored included Chief Boatswain's Mate Harry Gibson (posthumously) and Chief Electrician's Mate L. J. Kelly, who both received the Navy Cross; and Richards, Scott, and Chief Boatswain's Mate Charles Charlesworth all received letters of commendation. Rose was awarded the Pour le Mérite and Ritterkreuz des Hohenzollerschen Hausordens mit Schwertern for this and other achievements in the tonnage war.

== Wreck ==
On 11 August 2022, British deep-sea divers located the wreck of Jacob Jones off the Isles of Scilly at a depth of 377 feet (115 m). Numerous artifacts were located, including the 80-pound (36 kg) ship's bell. The divers, who found the bell lying on its side, flipped it upright and photographed and filmed it.

On 15 January 2024, the British Ministry of Defence used an underwater robotic vehicle to salvage the ship's bell at the request of the U.S. Navy's Naval History and Heritage Command. The inscriptions "Jacob Jones" and "1915" were still visible on the bell, and its clapper was still in place. The bell was placed in the custody of Wessex Archaeology in Salisbury, England, with plans calling for it to be sent to the Naval History and Heritage Command's underwater archaeology unit at the Washington Navy Yard in Washington, D.C. The bell was transferred to the U.S. Navy in a handover ceremony on 20 May 2024.

== See also ==
- USS Reuben James (DD-245) – a United States Navy destroyer sunk prior to the American entry into World War II.
- USS Jacob Jones (DD-130) - namesake sunk by torpedo during the Second World War

== Bibliography ==
- Feuer, A. B. (1999). The U.S. Navy in World War I. Westport, Connecticut: Praeger. ISBN 978-0-275-96212-8. OCLC 40595325.
- Gardiner, Robert; Gray, Randal, eds. (1985). Conway's All the World's Fighting Ships 1906–1921. Annapolis, Maryland: Naval Institute Press. ISBN 978-0-87021-907-8. OCLC 12119866.
- Gibson, R. H.; Maurice Prendergast (2003) [1931]. The German Submarine War, 1914–1918. Annapolis, Maryland: Naval Institute Press. ISBN 9781591143147. OCLC 52924732.
- Naval History & Heritage Command. "Bagley". Dictionary of American Naval Fighting Ships. Navy Department, Naval History and Heritage Command.
- Naval History & Heritage Command. "Cassin". Dictionary of American Naval Fighting Ships. Navy Department, Naval History & Heritage Command.
- Naval History & Heritage Command. "Jacob Jones". Dictionary of American Naval Fighting Ships. Navy Department, Naval History & Heritage Command.
- Stringer, Harry R. (1921). The Navy Book of Distinguished Service. Washington, D.C.: Fassett Pub. Co. OCLC 2654351.
