= Kalak Khan =

Kalak Khan کلک خان
- Village
- Location within Iran
- Coordinates: 32°49′57″N 48°16′39″E
- Country: Iran
- Province: Khuzestan
- County: Andimeshk
- Bakhsh: Alvar-e Garmsiri
- Rural District: Qilab

Population (2006)
  - Total: 30
- Time zone: UTC+3:30 (IRST)
  - Summer (DST): UTC+4:30 (IRDT)

Kalak Khan (Persian: کلک خان, also Romanized as Kalak Khān) is a village in Qilab Rural District, Alvar-e Garmsiri District, Andimeshk County, Khuzestan Province, Iran. At the 2006 census, its population was 30, in 7 families.
