= Vasilije Kolak =

Bosnian footballer

Personal information
- Date of birth: 8 March 1995 (age 31)
- Place of birth: Trebinje, Bosnia and Herzegovina
- Height: 1.94 m (6 ft 4 in)
- Position: Goalkeeper

Team information
- Current team: GOŠK Gabela
- Number: 32

Youth career
- –2013: Leotar

Senior career*
Years	Team	Apps	(Gls)
2013–2016	Leotar		
2016–2017	Zvijezda Gradačac	22	(0)
2017–2018	Zvijezda 09	0	(0)
2018	Travnik	14	(0)
2018	Zvijezda 09	0	(0)
2018–2019	Igman Konjic	14	(0)
2019	Zrinjski Mostar	1	(0)
2019–2021	Krupa	40	(0)
2021–2024	TS Galaxy	33	(0)
2024–	GOŠK Gabela	14	(0)
- * Club domestic league appearances and goals as of 10 June 2025

Vasilije Kolak (born 8 March 1995) is a Bosnian professional footballer who plays as a goalkeeper for Bosnian Premier League club GOŠK Gabela.

== Career ==
Kolak signed his contract with Bosnian club Zrinjski Mostar in January 2019.

He then signed with another Bosnian club, Krupa, in July 2019. He left the club after two years.

Kolak signed with TS Galaxy in July 2023.

== Career statistics ==
=== Club ===
As of match played 9 December 2023

Appearances and goals by club, season and competition
Club	Season	League			National cup (Note: Includes Bosnia and Herzegovina Football Cup, Nedbank Cup)		Europe		Total	
Club	Season	League	Apps	Goals	Apps	Goals	Apps	Goals	Apps	Goals
Zvijezda Gradačac	2016–17	First League of FBiH	22	0	0	0	0	0	22	0
Zvijezda 09	2017–18	First League of RS	0	0	4	0	0	0	4	0
Travnik	2017–18	First League of FBiH	14	0	0	0	0	0	14	0
Igman Konjic	2018–19	First League of FBiH	14	0	0	0	0	0	14	0
Zrinjski Mostar	2018–19	Bosnian Premier League	1	0	0	0	0	0	1	0
Krupa	2019–20	First League of RS	13	0	1	0	0	0	14	0
Krupa	2020–21	Bosnian Premier League	27	0	2	0	0	0	29	0
Krupa	Total		40	0	3	0	0	0	43	0
TS Galaxy	2021–22	South African Premier Division	11	0	0	0	0	0	11	0
TS Galaxy	2022–23	South African Premier Division	10	0	1	0	0	0	11	0
TS Galaxy	2023–24	South African Premier Division	12	0	0	0	0	0	12	0
TS Galaxy	Total		33	0	1	0	0	0	34	0
Career total			69	0	12	0	8	0	89	0
