= Kalgadarreh-ye Do =

Kalgadarreh-ye Do کلگه‌دره دو
- Village
- Location within Iran
- Coordinates: 32°46′51″N 48°16′53″E
- Country: Iran
- Province: Khuzestan
- County: Andimeshk
- Bakhsh: Alvar-e Garmsiri
- Rural District: Qilab

Population (2006)
  - Total: 625
- Time zone: UTC+3:30 (IRST)
  - Summer (DST): UTC+4:30 (IRDT)

Kalgadarreh-ye Do (Persian: کلگه‌دره دو, also Romanized as Kalgadarreh-ye Do; also known as Kalak Darreh and Kalakdarreh-ye Do) is a village in Qilab Rural District, Alvar-e Garmsiri District, Andimeshk County, Khuzestan Province, Iran. At the 2006 census, its population was 625, in 119 families.
