= Kalgadarreh-ye Yek =

Kalgadarreh-ye Yek کلگه‌دره یک
- village
- Location within Iran
- Coordinates: 32°47′01″N 48°16′35″E
- Country: Iran
- Province: Khuzestan
- County: Andimeshk
- Bakhsh: Alvar-e Garmsiri
- Rural District: Qilab

Population (2006)
  - Total: 295
- Time zone: UTC+3:30 (IRST)
  - Summer (DST): UTC+4:30 (IRDT)

Kalgadarreh-ye Yek (Persian: کلگه‌دره یک, also Romanized as Kalgadarreh-ye Yek; also known as Kalak Darreh, Kalakdarreh-ye Yek, Kalgeh Darreh, and Kalk Darreh) is a village in Qilab Rural District, Alvar-e Garmsiri District, Andimeshk County, Khuzestan Province, Iran. At the 2006 census, its population was 295 in 63 families.
