= Jay Kalk =

Jay Ernest
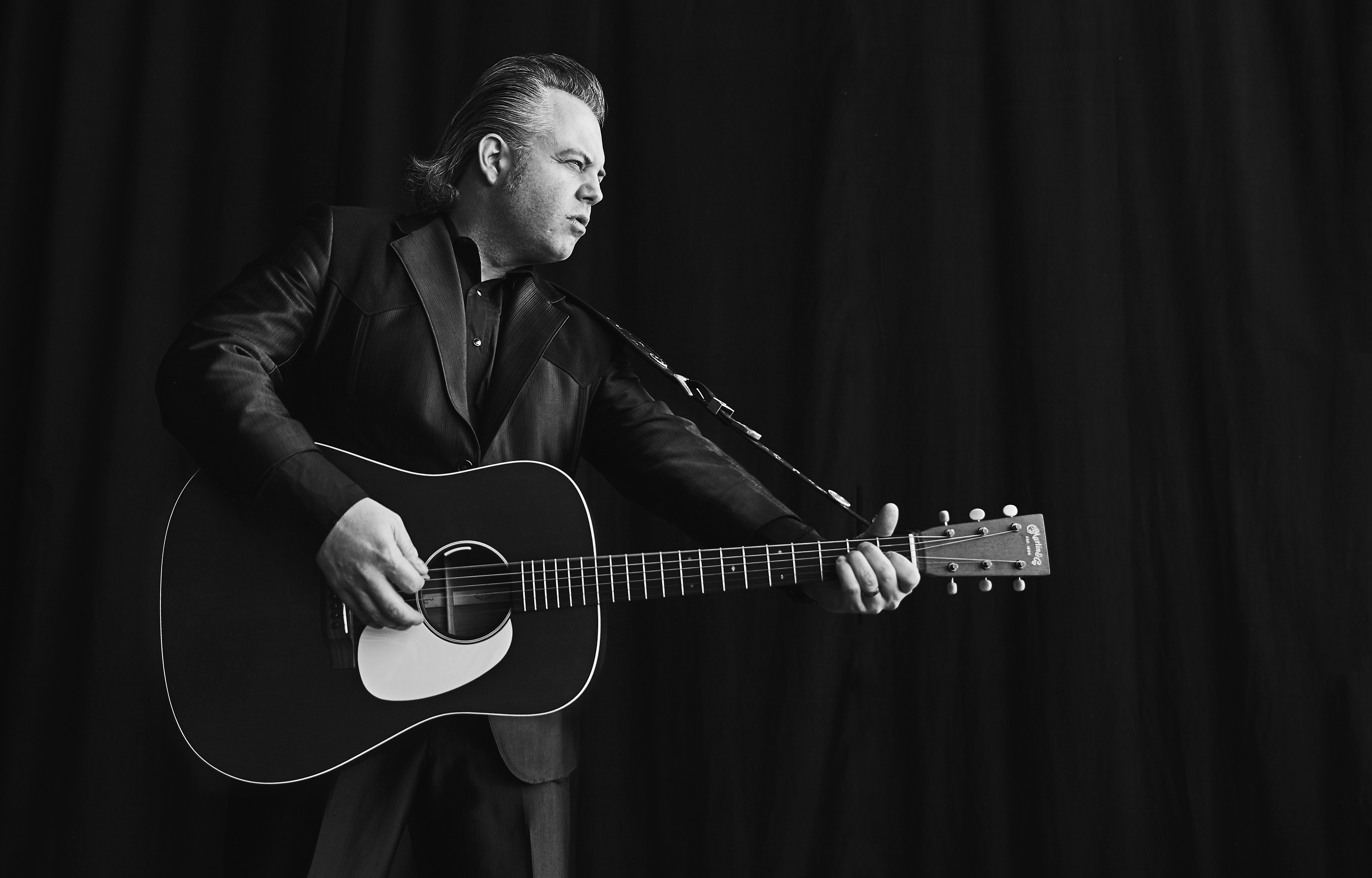

Background information
- Born: Jay Ernest Kalk; January 11, 1975 (age 51)
- Origin: New Ulm, Minnesota
- Genres: Country, Irish, New Wave, Punk, Rock, Rocksteady, Soul
- Occupation: musician
- Instruments: Vocal, Bass, guitar
- Website: Jayder's Music

Jay Kalk, AKA Jay Ernest, AKA Jayder (born January 11, 1975) is an American and International touring and recording artist formerly based out of Los Angeles, Phoenix, Honolulu, who currently resides in Minneapolis, Minnesota. He has recorded and performed with many artists such as Go Jimmy Go, Warsaw Poland Brothers, and 3 Minute Hero. His most recent endeavor, Church of Cash, is a Johnny Cash Tribute show.

== Childhood ==
Jay Kalk was born in New Ulm, Minnesota and raised on a farm with his mother, father and two younger brothers. With the money he made from bailing hay and other farm work in the summer of 1988, he bought his first Guitar. Throughout the years of 1989 - 1993 he and his friends formed a band called Silly Pudgy. Kalk also performed with an a cappella group called One Way who performed at the Minnesota State Fair in 1992 and 1993. In high school he focused on his voice by taking vocal lessons and being involved with the choir available. He earned a spot on the Minnesota All-State Men's choir in the summer of 1992 under the direction of Carl Stam.

== 1995-2000 ==
Kalk attended college at Minnesota State University Moorhead where he studied Music Performance with and emphasis on voice. He studied voice with Charles Ruzicka and was very involved with the choir program. In 1995, along with some friends who were fans of Ska music, assembled the band 3 Minute Hero for which he played guitar. The band rapidly grew to local fame and recorded their first album at Raptor Studios in 1997. Soon after the release of their first album "Bingo," Barking Dog Records of Fargo, North Dakota, signed the band and set them out to tour in support of their album. The band won a bus at the Battle of the Bands at the Old Broadway bar later that year to use as their vehicle to tour. In 1998 they released their second album called "Everyday Ninjas", which the band promoted vigorously touring around the upper Midwest garnering their first Minnesota Music Award . 3MH opened for such acts as Mighty Mighty Bosstones, Styx, Hootie & the Blowfish, Warsaw, Béla Fleck, Fishbone, and The Living End. In 1999, the band left Barking Dog Records to record an album under their own direction and hired Alex Oana to produce and record their third album, "Operation Brown Star". In the same year the band won their second Minnesota Music Award. After 800 shows and 3 albums, the band broke up on October 11, 2000.

== 2001-2005 ==
In September 2001, Kalk moved to Los Angeles and joined the band Warsaw Poland Brothers on the Bass guitar. It was the beginning of his career with Warsaw that he received the nickname "Jayder" from Jesse "Monkeybone" Ribyat, jokingly combining "Jay" with his Midwest accented phrase, "Hey There". The band toured 275 days a year from NYC to Waikiki and earned the underground reputation as the hardest working band in America. They have opened for such bands while Kalk was aboard like: Aquabats, and Bay City Rollers. In the Summer of 2003, Warsaw was the headlining act of the Tour de Fat, which had 13 dates in the Southwest States.Warsaw is sponsored by Jägermeister and played the Arizona date of the Jägermeister Music Tour opening for Alterbridge in 2004. Kalk recorded only one complete album with WSP, called "First to Fight" and appeared on 3 other albums which are released under Invisible Mass Records. Kalk quit the band in May 2005 after 1000 shows.

== 2005-2009 ==
Needing some time off after touring with Warsaw, Kalk moved to Phoenix, Arizona. Kalk took his expertise and years of experience in music and started a record label called Jayder Records. Kalk started the record company seeking an opportunity for himself and his musician friends to have full creative control over their intellectual property.

He teamed up with Sara McAllister and played many shows in the Phoenix area. They enlisted the help of Jesse "Monkeybone" Ribyat and Camron Tuttle, (former musicians from Warsaw Poland Brothers) and also Mike "Madman" Madson (formally of the Mad Caddies) to record Sara McAllisters first album called "Pheetown Girl". The album was the produced and was released on Kalk's label, Jayder Records. Kalk was also involved in an electro/rock group called Army of Robots who played locally around Arizona and did small tours. AoR submitted a recording and won recording time at The Document room in Malibu, California where they recorded two songs.

In 2007 Kalk moved to Hawaii to join the legendary ska band, Go Jimmy Go. After moving there, GJG recorded their 3rd album (first album with Kalk), called "Holiday Hell Yeah", which was commissioned by the Japanese record label, Ska in the World. Kalk went on tour to Europe in support of the "Holiday" album with the help of Bucket from The Toasters. GJG toured through Spain, Belgium, Germany and Denmark. That year GJG was nominated for a Hoku Award for Best Holiday Album. Back in Honolulu, GJG opened for groups such as Ozomatli and Smash Mouth, but most notably, joined Jack Johnson and Dave Mathews on stage for Kokua Fest at the Waikiki Shell in 2008. The Universal Pictures movie, Forgetting Sarah Marshall, used a poster of Go Jimmy Go in the film. GJG finished their 5th and self-titled album in 2009 and supported it by a tour of Asia called Hawaiian Punch Tour, covering Japan and China. Jump Up Records out of Chicago also released this album on Vinyl. In October 2009, the band did a west coast tour with the Phenomenauts in which they played one of the final days of the Knitting Factory, LA before they closed their doors forever. Later that year, GJG was again nominated for a Hoku award, this time in the Reggae category. In Honolulu, Kalk started a punk rock Irish band called Working Class Saints and also a Johnny Cash Tribute show called the Church of Cash. Before the end of the year, Kalk finished his first solo album on Jayder Records called 09.

== 2010-Present ==
Kalk, under the stage name, Jay Ernest, tours and makes records with his Johnny Cash Tribute band, Church of Cash. He started a production company with Jonathon TeBeest called BB Productions where they work on projects by the Jensen Sisters as well as Church of Cash. Church of Cash was awarded "Best Tribute Act" by the Midwest Country Organization in 2019 and was inducted to the Minnesota Music Hall of Fame in 2021. Kalk has released 4 studio records with Church of Cash to date as well as touring the United States, Belgium and the Netherlands. Over the Covid down time experienced by many artists, Kalk along with Tom Pickard, created a company called "Tribute Drama Productions" in which they wrote a musical called "Folsom Prison Experience."

== Releases ==
1996 3 Minute Hero - Tape Single

1997 3 Minute Hero - Bingo

1997 Compilation Skanarchy 3 - 3 Minuter Hero (Trailer Park)

1998 3 Minute Hero - Everyday Ninjas

1999 3 Minute Hero - Operation Brown Star

2003 Warsaw Poland Brothers - Live

2004 Compilation Jägermeister 10 Year Anniversary - Warsaw (Hill's o' Yucca Valley)

2004 Warsaw/Stucky - Dub Confrontation

2005 Warsaw Poland Brothers - Best of Ska and Rocksteady 1995-2005

2006 Warsaw Poland Brothers - First to Fight

2006 Sara McAlister - Pheetown Girl (Jayder Records)

2007 Go Jimmy Go - Holiday Hell Yeah

2007 Go Jimmy Go - Holiday Hell Yeah (Ska in the World) Japan

2007 Go Jimmy Go - 7" Holiday (Ska in the World) Japan

2009 Jayder - 09 (Jayder Records)

2009 Go Jimmy Go - Go Jimmy Go

2009 Go Jimmy Go - Go Jimmy Go (Ska in the World) Japan

2010 Compilation - Lovers Steady Lesson One (Ska in the World) Japan

2010 Compilation - Heart Breaking Music (Ska in the World) Japan

2010 Sawbones - Hot as a Whore House on Nickel Night (Jayder Records)

2011 3 Minute Hero - F- (Jayder Records)

2012 Urchinz Cluster (Unreleased) (Bass and Production)

2015 Church of Cash - Self Titled (Jayder Records)

2016 Go Jimmy Go "A Hui Hou": 20th Anniversary & Farewell Show CD

2018 Church of Cash - Thank You Sir (Jayder Records)

2019 3 Minute Hero - Jumbo Jet Whispers and Thunder Lizard Serenades Vinyl

2019 The Jensen Sisters - Highway Hippie EP (Bass and Production)

2019 Go Jimmy Go "A Hui Hou": 20th Anniversary & Farewell Show Documentary DVD

2019 Church of Cash - Christmas Songs EP

2020 The Jensen Sisters - Yellow Frames (Bass and Production)

2021 Church of Cash - Flowers for June (Jayder Records)
