= Calk, Kentucky =

Unincorporated community in Kentucky, United States

- Unincorporated community
- Location within Kentucky Location within the United States
- Coordinates: 38°01′47″N 83°57′51″W
- Country: United States
- State: Kentucky
- County: Montgomery
- Elevation: 981 ft (299 m)
- Time zone: UTC-5 (Eastern (EST))
  - Summer (DST): UTC-4 (EDT)
- GNIS feature ID: 2491587

Calk is an unincorporated community within Montgomery County, Kentucky, United States.
