= Curt Kalk =

Curtis Leroy Kalk is an Ojibwe politician for the Mille Lacs Band of Ojibwe, located in east-central Minnesota. Elected in 2009, Curt Kalk served at the tribe's Secretary/Treasurer. As Secretary/Treasurer, he authorized all subpoenas and official documents on behalf of the Band Assembly (the tribal council of the Mille Lacs Band) and investigated financial irregularities. Kalk also served as Speaker of the Band Assembly, the legislative body that enacts laws that regulate the Band's affairs and appropriates money for tribal government programs.

Before being elected Secretary/Treasurer, Kalk served as Commissioner of Natural Resources for nine years. He has also worked for the Band's Department of Natural Resources as a deputy registrar. As the Commissioner of Natural Resources, Curt sat on the board of directors for the Great Lakes Indian Fish & Wildlife Commission; due to his natural resources background, as the Secretary/Treasurer, he also served as member of the United States Environmental Protection Agency's National Tribal Operations Committee in 2009–2011.

Kalk graduated with honors from the Band's Nay Ah Shing High School in 1981; he is the first graduate from that school to become an elected official for the Band. After his high school graduation, Kalk served in the U.S. Marine Corps for four years. After his military service, Kalk worked for the federal government for 13 years, owned and operated a resort on Mille Lacs Lake, and worked as a subcontractor in carpentry.

Preceded by Herbert Weyaus	Secretary/Treasurer of the Mille Lacs Band of Ojibwe; 2009–2014	Succeeded by Carolyn Shaw-Beaulieu
Preceded by Don Wedll	Commissioner of Natural Resources of the Mille Lacs Band of Ojibwe; 2001–2009	Succeeded by Bradley Kalk
