= Sarjub, Sistan and Baluchestan =

Sarjub سرجوب
- Village
- Location within Iran
- Coordinates: 27°25′40″N 60°49′22″E
- Country: Iran
- Province: Sistan and Baluchestan
- County: Iranshahr
- Bakhsh: Central
- Rural District: Damen

Population (2006)
  - Total: 872
- Time zone: UTC+3:30 (IRST)
  - Summer (DST): UTC+4:30 (IRDT)

Sarjub (Persian: سرجوب, also Romanized as Sarjūb and Sarjoob; also known as Sarchūb) is a village in Damen Rural District, in the Central District of Iranshahr County, Sistan and Baluchestan Province, Iran. At the 2006 census, its population was 872, in 154 families.
