= Kalak-e Amjadi =

Kalag-e Amjadi کلگ امجدی
- Village
- Location within Iran
- Coordinates: 35°00′42″N 47°33′47″E
- Country: Iran
- Province: Kermanshah
- County: Sonqor
- Bakhsh: Central
- Rural District: Gavrud

Population (2006)
  - Total: 618
- Time zone: UTC+3:30 (IRST)
  - Summer (DST): UTC+4:30 (IRDT)

Kalag-e Amjadi (Persian: کلگ امجدی, also Romanized as Kalag-e Amjadī; also known as Kalag, Kaleg, Kaleg-e Amjadī, Kaleg, Kaleg, and Kaleg) is a village in Gavrud Rural District, in the Central District of Sonqor County, Kermanshah Province, Iran. At the 2006 census, its population was 618, in 143 families.
