= Kalak, Lorestan =

Kalak كلك
- Village
- Location within Iran
- Coordinates: 33°37′12″N 47°16′48″E
- Country: Iran
- Province: Lorestan
- County: Kuhdasht
- Bakhsh: Kunani
- Rural District: Zirtang

Population (2006)
  - Total: 46
- Time zone: UTC+3:30 (IRST)
  - Summer (DST): UTC+4:30 (IRDT)

Kalak (Persian: كلك, also Romanized as Kalaḵ) is a village in Zirtang Rural District, Kunani District, Kuhdasht County, Lorestan Province, Iran. At the 2006 census, its population was 46, in 8 families.
