= Jelu, Mazandaran =

Jelu جلو
- Village
- Location within Iran
- Coordinates: 36°48′43″N 50°41′40″E
- Country: Iran
- Province: Mazandaran
- County: Ramsar
- Bakhsh: Central
- Rural District: Chehel Shahid

Population (2006)
  - Total: 54
- Time zone: UTC+3:30 (IRST)
  - Summer (DST): UTC+4:30 (IRDT)

Jelu (Persian: جلو, also Romanized as Jelū; also known as Jīlū) is a village in Chehel Shahid Rural District, in the Central District of Ramsar County, Mazandaran Province, Iran. At the 2006 census, its population was 54, in 14 families.
