= Kələk =

- Municipality
- Location within Azerbaijan
- Coordinates: 40°43′50″N 46°41′12″E
- Country: Azerbaijan
- Rayon: Goranboy

Population
  - Total: 714
- Time zone: UTC+4 (AZT)
  - Summer (DST): UTC+5 (AZT)

Kələk (also Kelek and Kyalyak) is a village and municipality in the Goranboy Rayon of Azerbaijan. It has a population of 714.
