= Stanton Frederick Kalk =

United States naval officer

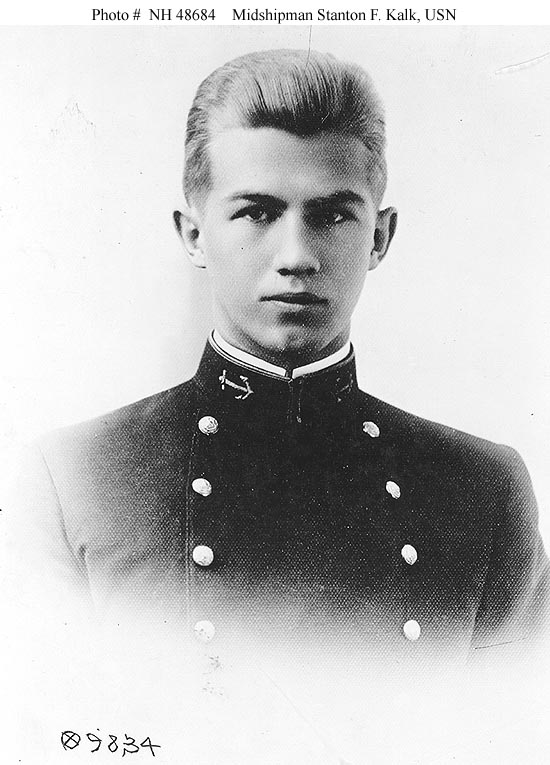
- Midshipman Stanton F. Kalk, USN
- Born: 14 October 1894; Mobile County, Alabama
- Died: 6 December 1917 (aged 23)
- Burial place: Brookwood American Military Cemetery
- Military career
- Allegiance: United States of America
- Branch: United States Navy
- Service years: 1916 - 1917
- Rank: Lieutenant
- Units: USS Florida (BB-30); USS Jacob Jones (DD-61)
- Conflicts: World War I Battle of the Atlantic
- Awards: Distinguished Service Medal

Stanton Frederick Kalk (14 October 1894 – 6 December 1917) was an officer in the United States Navy during World War I. He received the Navy's Distinguished Service Medal for his actions after his ship was torpedoed by a German submarine.

== Biography ==
Stanton Kalk was born in Mobile County, Alabama, the son of Frank Kalk and Flora Stanton Kalk. He was appointed to the Naval Academy by Nebraska Senator Norris Brown, and graduated in 1916, fifty-first in a class of 178.

After serving on the battleship USS Florida (BB-30), he was assigned to the destroyer USS Jacob Jones (DD-61) on 10 September 1917. While steaming on patrol duty from Brest, France, to Queenstown, Ireland, Jacob Jones was attacked on 6 December by German submarine U-53. Although Kalk, officer-of-the-deck during the attack, "took correct and especially prompt measures in maneuvering to avoid the torpedo," the destroyer could not turn in time to escape. She sank stern first in eight minutes. Though stunned by the explosion and weakened by his action after the ship went down, Kalk swam from one raft to another in an attempt to equalize weight on them. Displaying "extraordinary heroism," he disregarded his own condition while endeavoring to save the lives of his men. Game to the last, Kalk overtaxed his own strength; he died from exposure and exhaustion.

For his "splendid self-sacrifice" Lt. (j.g.) Kalk was posthumously awarded the Distinguished Service Medal.

== Namesakes ==
Two destroyers, USS Kalk (DD-170) and USS Kalk (DD-611), were named for him.
