= Karvaneh, Hamadan =

Karvaneh كاروانه
- Village
- Location within Iran
- Coordinates: 35°32′00″N 49°00′09″E
- Country: Iran
- Province: Hamadan
- County: Razan
- Bakhsh: Central
- Rural District: Kharqan

Population (2006)
  - Total: 103
- Time zone: UTC+3:30 (IRST)
  - Summer (DST): UTC+4:30 (IRDT)

Karvaneh (Persian: كاروانه, also Romanized as Kārvāneh; also known as Garvāneh, Gīrvānrā, and Kīrwānra) is a village in Kharqan Rural District, in the Central District of Razan County, Hamadan Province, Iran. At the 2006 census, its population was 103, in 35 families.
