= Kalak-e Sar Bisheh =

Kalak-e Sar Bisheh کلک سربیشه
- Village
- Country: Iran
- Province: Kohgiluyeh and Boyer-Ahmad
- County: Gachsaran
- Bakhsh: Central
- Rural District: Emamzadeh Jafar

Population (2006)
  - Total: 15
- Time zone: UTC+3:30 (IRST)
  - Summer (DST): UTC+4:30 (IRDT)

Kalak-e Sar Bisheh (Persian: کلک سربیشه, also Romanized as Kalak-e Sar Bīsheh) is a village in Emamzadeh Jafar Rural District, in the Central District of Gachsaran County, Kohgiluyeh and Boyer-Ahmad Province, Iran. At the 2006 census, its population was 15, in 5 families.
