= Kalak Jafar =

Kalak Jafar كلك جعفر
- Village
- Location within Iran
- Coordinates: 33°49′37″N 46°40′43″E
- Country: Iran
- Province: Kermanshah
- County: Eslamabad-e Gharb
- Bakhsh: Homeyl
- Rural District: Mansuri

Population (2006)
  - Total: 46
- Time zone: UTC+3:30 (IRST)
  - Summer (DST): UTC+4:30 (IRDT)

Kalak Jafar (Persian: كلك جعفر, also Romanized as Kalak Ja‘far) is a village in Mansuri Rural District, Homeyl District, Eslamabad-e Gharb County, Kermanshah Province, Iran. At the 2006 census, its population was 46, in 10 families.
