= USS Kalk (DD-170) =

Wickes-class destroyer

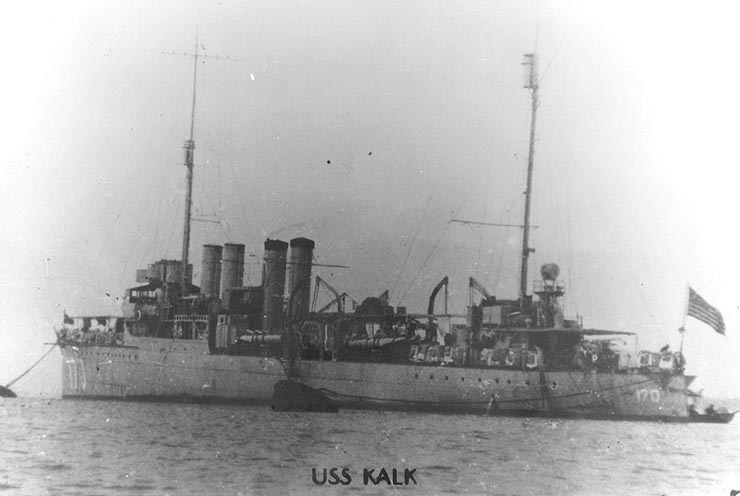
- USS Kalk (DD-170)

History

United States
- Name: USS Kalk
- Namesake: Stanton Frederick Kalk
- Builder: Fore River Shipyard, Quincy, Massachusetts
- Laid down: 17 August 1918 as Rodgers
- Launched: 21 December 1918
- Renamed: Kalk, 23 December 1918
- Commissioned: 29 March 1919
- Decommissioned: 10 July 1922
- Recommissioned: 17 June 1940
- Decommissioned: 23 September 1940
- Stricken: 8 January 1941
- Identification: DD-170
- Fate: Transferred to United Kingdom, 23 September 1940

United Kingdom
- Name: HMS Hamilton
- Commissioned: 23 September 1940
- Identification: Pennant number: I24
- Fate: Transferred to Canada June 1941

Canada
- Name: HMCS Hamilton
- Commissioned: June 1941
- Decommissioned: 8 June 1945
- Honours and awards: Atlantic, 1942-43.
- Fate: Towed away for scrapping 6 July 1945
- Notes: Became tender 1943

General characteristics
- Class & type: Wickes-class destroyer
- Displacement: 1,060 tons
- Length: 314 ft 5 in (95.83 m)
- Beam: 31 ft 8 in (9.65 m)
- Draft: 9 ft 2 in (2.79 m)
- Speed: 35 kn (65 km/h; 40 mph)
- Complement: 101 officers and enlisted
- Armament: 4 x 4"/50 caliber guns; 2 x 1-pounder guns; 12 x 21 inch (533 mm) torpedo tubes

The first USS Kalk (DD–170) was a Wickes-class destroyer in the United States Navy during World War I, later transferred to the Royal Navy as HMS Hamilton (I24) and then into the Royal Canadian Navy as HMCS Hamilton (I24).

== Construction and career ==
=== United States Navy ===
Named for Stanton Frederick Kalk, Kalk, laid down as Rodgers 17 August 1918. The ship was launched on 21 December 1918, by the Fore River Shipbuilding Corporation, Quincy, Massachusetts; sponsored by Mrs. Flora Stanton Kalk, mother of Lieutenant Kalk. Rodgers was renamed Kalk on 23 December 1918 and commissioned at Boston on 29 March 1919.

After shakedown off Newport, Rhode Island, Kalk departed Boston on 3 May for Newfoundland. Arriving at Trespassey on 5 May, she sailed 3 days later for the mid-Atlantic to provide rescue cover during the pioneer flight of the United States Navy seaplane NC-4 from Newfoundland to the Azores on 16 to 17 May. After returning to Boston on 20 May, she sailed for Europe on 10 July, arriving at Brest, France, 21 July. Proceeding via England to Hamburg, Germany, she arrived on 27 July to begin a 3-week cruise through the Baltic Sea, visiting Baltic and Scandinavian countries on American Relief Administration operations. She returned to Brest on 23 August to serve as a dispatch and escort ship until departing for the United States 25 January 1920.

Arriving at Boston on 12 February, she trained reserves of the 1st Naval District and operated with DesRon 3 along the Atlantic Coast from Cape Cod to Charleston, South Carolina. As a result of the Five Power Naval Treaty, which was signed at the Washington Conference 6 February 1922, Kalk departed Boston 10 May for Philadelphia, where she decommissioned on 10 July and was placed in reserve.

When war in Europe threatened the security of the entire world, Kalk was recommissioned on 17 June 1940. The ship departed Philadelphia on 26 July, arriving at Charleston on 31 July for duty with the Neutrality Patrol in the Atlantic. Kalk was one of 50 overage destroyers turned over to Britain in exchange for strategic bases in the Atlantic under terms of the Destroyers for Bases Agreement of 2 September. She cleared Charleston on 7 September and steamed via Hampton Roads and Newport to Halifax, Nova Scotia, arriving on 18 September. Kalk decommissioned on 23 September and was turned over to the British the same day.

=== Royal Navy ===
Commissioned in the Royal Navy as HMS Hamilton, which was a placename common to both the UK and US. The 2 November 1940, issue of The Royal Gazette, the newspaper published in the City of Hamilton in the Imperial fortress colony of Bermuda (where the America and West Indies Station of the Royal Navy had its base at the Royal Naval Dockyard, Bermuda, and where Allied naval vessels deploying from North America to the Battle of the Atlantic completed their working up), reported this in an article titled "NEW" DESTROYER HAS NAME OF HAMILTON: Mayor Here Receives Letter From Her Commander, and began:

News has been received here of the destroyer Hamilton, one of the 50 destroyers recently acquired by Great Britain from the United States and named in honour of Bermuda's capital. Commander L. M. Shadwell, R.N., who commands the Hamilton, has written to the Mayor of Hamilton, Mr. S. P. Eve, a letter in which he says, "I thought it possible that you might be interested to have news from time to time of the ship which has the honour to bear the name of your city."

(The article went on to mention that the Mayor was to open a fund to supply the crew of the ship with newspapers and included the text of Shadwell's letter).

She collided with HMS Georgetown (formerly the US destroyer Maddox) at St. John's, Newfoundland and Labrador on 1 October while en route to England. Proceeding to Saint John, New Brunswick, for repairs, she went aground and suffered extensive damage. Because of a British manpower shortage, she was manned by Canadians during and after repair operations. Hamilton was modified for trade convoy escort service by removal of three of the original 4"/50 caliber guns and one of the triple torpedo tube mounts to reduce topside weight for additional depth charge stowage and installation of hedgehog anti-submarine weapon.

=== Royal Canadian Navy ===
Late in June 1941 she commissioned in the Royal Canadian Navy as HMCS Hamilton fitting within the Canadian practice of naming destroyers after Canadian rivers—the Hamilton River of Labrador.

Throughout her active service, she remained in North American waters, protecting convoys from St. John's to New York. On 2 August 1942, she sighted and attacked a German U-boat and, by forcing it to submerge, prevented an attack on the convoy. Declared unfit for operations 11 August 1943, she became a tender to HMCS Cornwallis at Annapolis, Nova Scotia. Declared surplus 1 April 1945, she decommissioned 8 June at Sydney, Nova Scotia. Hamilton departed Sydney 6 July under tow for Baltimore, Maryland, where she was sold for scrapping by the Boston Iron & Metal Company, but was lost while being towed to Baltimore.
