= Cheshmeh Sorkheh =

Cheshmeh Sorkheh چشمه سرخه
- Village
- Location within Iran
- Coordinates: 33°23′39″N 48°19′29″E
- Country: Iran
- Province: Lorestan
- County: Khorramabad
- Bakhsh: Central
- Rural District: Koregah-e Sharqi

Population (2006)
  - Total: 369
- Time zone: UTC+3:30 (IRST)
  - Summer (DST): UTC+4:30 (IRDT)

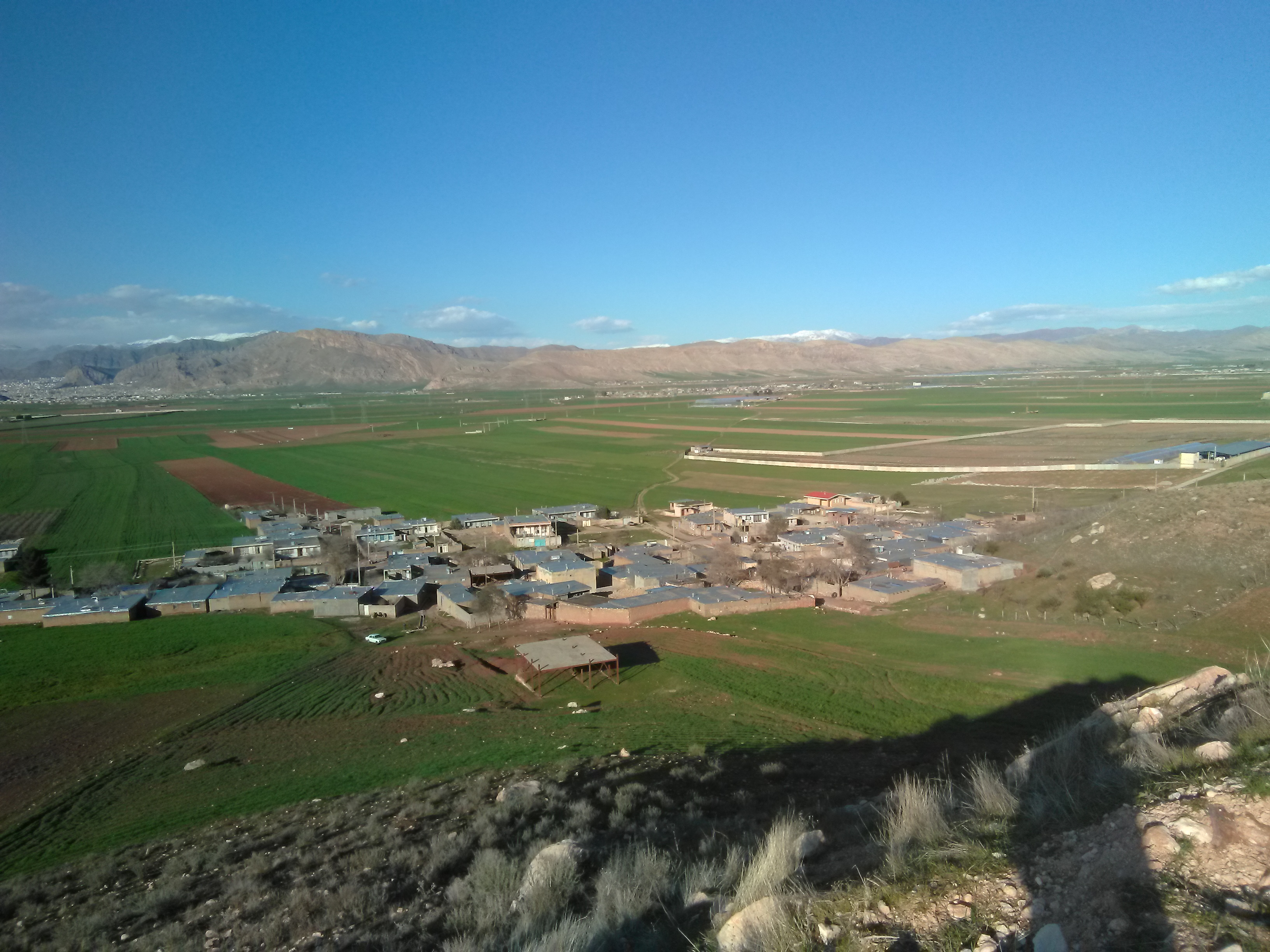
Cheshmeh Sorkheh

Cheshmeh Sorkheh (Persian: چشمه سرخه, also Romanized as Cheshmeh Sorkh; also known as Cheshmeh Sorkheh-ye Dārā’ī) is a village in Koregah-e Sharqi Rural District, in the Central District of Khorramabad County, Lorestan province, Iran. At the 2006 census, its population was 369, in 77 families.
