= Jalal-e Sofla =

Jalal-e Sofla جلال سفلي
- Village
- Location within Iran
- Coordinates: 32°59′58″N 59°25′18″E
- Country: Iran
- Province: South Khorasan
- County: Birjand
- Bakhsh: Central
- Rural District: Kahshang

Population (2006)
  - Total: 12
- Time zone: UTC+3:30 (IRST)
  - Summer (DST): UTC+4:30 (IRDT)

Jalal-e Sofla (Persian: جلال سفلي, also Romanized as Jalāl-e Soflá; also known as Jalāl-e Pā’īn, Jalāl, Jalār, Jelau, and Jelow) is a village in Kahshang Rural District, in the Central District of Birjand County, South Khorasan Province, Iran. At the 2006 census, its population was 12, in 6 families.
