= Galak, Sistan and Baluchestan =

Galak گلك
- Village
- Location within Iran
- Coordinates: 27°30′07″N 60°45′24″E
- Country: Iran
- Province: Sistan and Baluchestan
- County: Iranshahr
- Bakhsh: Central
- Rural District: Abtar

Population (2006)
  - Total: 48
- Time zone: UTC+3:30 (IRST)
  - Summer (DST): UTC+4:30 (IRDT)

Galak (Persian: گلك; also known as Kalāh and Kalak) is a village in Abtar Rural District, in the Central District of Iranshahr County, Sistan and Baluchestan Province, Iran. At the 2006 census, its population was 48, in 12 families.
