= Osmanvand Rural District =

Rural district in Kermanshah province, Iran

Osmanvand Rural District Persian: دهستان عثمان‌وند
- Rural District
- Location within Iran
- Coordinates: 33°54′37″N 47°11′56″E
- Country: Iran
- Province: Kermanshah
- County: Kermanshah
- District: Firuzabad
- Capital: Anjab-e Buzhan

Population (2016)
  - Total: 4,405
- Time zone: UTC+3:30 (IRST)

Osmanvand Rural District (Persian: دهستان عثمان‌وند) is in Firuzabad District of Kermanshah County, Kermanshah province, Iran. Its capital is the village of Anjab-e Buzhan. The previous capital of the rural district was the village of Sar Jub-e Qaleh Masgareh.

== Demographics ==
=== Population ===
At the time of the 2006 National Census, the rural district's population was 4,654 in 982 households. There were 4,718 inhabitants in 1,140 households at the following census of 2011. The 2016 census measured the population of the rural district as 4,405 in 1,106 households. The most populous of its 65 villages was Ashbakh, with 471 people.
