= Jalalvand Rural District =

Rural district in Kermanshah province, Iran

Jalalvand Rural District Persian: دهستان جلال وند
- Rural District
- Location within Iran
- Coordinates: 33°54′43″N 47°02′44″E
- Country: Iran
- Province: Kermanshah
- County: Kermanshah
- District: Firuzabad

Population (2016)
  - Total: 4,674
- Time zone: UTC+3:30 (IRST)

Jalalvand Rural District (Persian: دهستان جلال وند) is in Firuzabad District of Kermanshah County, Kermanshah province, Iran.

== Demographics ==
=== Population ===
At the time of the 2006 National Census, the rural district's population was 6,448 in 1,349 households. There were 5,619 inhabitants in 1,421 households at the following census of 2011. The 2016 census measured the population of the rural district as 4,674 in 1,297 households. The most populous of its 63 villages was Cheshmeh Gach, with 477 people.
