= Sar Firuzabad Rural District =

Rural district in Kermanshah province, Iran

Sar Firuzabad Rural District Persian: دهستان سر فيروزآباد
- Rural District
- Location within Iran
- Coordinates: 34°05′51″N 47°10′31″E
- Country: Iran
- Province: Kermanshah
- County: Kermanshah
- District: Firuzabad
- Capital: Halashi

Population (2016)
  - Total: 11,314
- Time zone: UTC+3:30 (IRST)

Sar Firuzabad Rural District (Persian: دهستان سر فيروزآباد) is in Firuzabad District of Kermanshah County, Kermanshah province, Iran. It is administered from the city of Halashi.

== Demographics ==
=== Population ===
At the time of the 2006 National Census, the rural district's population was 13,290 in 2,774 households. There were 14,149 inhabitants in 3,163 households at the following census of 2011. The 2016 census measured the population of the rural district as 11,314 in 2,999 households. The most populous of its 121 villages was Sarv-e Nav-e Sofla, with 694 people.
