= Firuzabad District (Kermanshah County) =

District in Kermanshah province, Iran

Firuzabad District Persian: بخش فیروزآباد
- District
- Location within Iran
- Coordinates: 34°01′12″N 47°10′31″E
- Country: Iran
- Province: Kermanshah
- County: Kermanshah
- Capital: Halashi

Population (2016)
  - Total: 21,197
- Time zone: UTC+3:30 (IRST)

Firuzabad District (Persian: بخش فیروزآباد) is in Kermanshah County, Kermanshah province, Iran. Its capital is the city of Halashi.

== Demographics ==
=== Population ===
At the time of the 2006 National Census, the district's population was 24,849 in 5,219 households. The following census in 2011 counted 25,255 people in 5,925 households. The 2016 census measured the population of the district as 21,197 inhabitants in 5,635 households.

=== Administrative divisions ===
Firuzabad District Population
Administrative Divisions	2006	2011	2016
Jalalvand RD	6,448	5,619	4,674
Osmanvand RD	4,654	4,718	4,405
Sar Firuzabad RD	13,290	14,149	11,314
Halashi (city)	457	769	804
Total	24,849	25,255	21,197
RD = Rural District
