= Tariana =

Tariana may refer to:

- Tariana people, an ethnic group of Brazil and Colombia
- Tariana language, an Arawakan language
- Tariana (Mandaeism), a ritual clay tray used in Mandaean religious rituals
- Tariana Turia (1944–2025), New Zealand politician

== See also ==
- Taryana, an ancient Iranian city
