= Meamar =

- Born: Ali Meamar; 1956 (age 69–70); Ahvaz, Iran
- Education: Accademia di Belle Arti Firenze (MFA in Interior Design & Sculpture); Accademia d’Arte e Design Leonetto Cappiello (Graphic Arts)
- Known for: Painting, Graphic Arts, Interior Design, Sculpture
- Notable work: Meamorphism Series
- Movement: Meamorphism
- Website: www.meamar.com

Meamar (born Ali Meamar, 1956) is an Iranian-American contemporary artist known for mixed-media paintings, fresco-inspired works, and a personal artistic style he calls Meamorphism. He is based in the San Francisco Bay Area.

== Biography ==
Ali Meamar was born in 1956 in Ahvaz, Iran. He studied fine arts at the Accademia delle Belle Arti in Florence, Italy, where he earned a Master of Fine Arts degree in Interior Design and Sculpture in 1982.

He later continued his studies at the Accademia d’Arte e Design Leonetto Cappiello in Florence, specializing in Graphic Arts under a master of fresco painting.

In 1985, Meamar emigrated to the United States, where he has continued his artistic career. He resides with his family in the San Francisco Bay Area.

== Artistic style ==
Meamar's work blends classical European techniques, especially fresco, sculpture, and Renaissance composition—with modern mixed-media practices. A central feature of his art is the integration of layered backgrounds: he frequently prints images of his earlier frescoes on wood panels and repaints over them, creating a palimpsest-like visual effect.

His art explores both traditional senses and what he calls "intangible senses" such as harmony, motion, temperature, and the emotional resonance of color.

== Meamorphism ==
Meamar uses the term Meamorphism to describe his artistic philosophy. The movement emphasizes:

- multilayered visual surfaces
- interaction between memory, time, and identity
- blending classical and contemporary materials
- surrealist influence, especially after a pivotal encounter with Salvador Dalí

Meamorphism extends into his digital artworks and NFT collections.

== Career ==
Meamar began exhibiting while still a student in Italy, later expanding his career to Switzerland, France, and the United States. His works have been shown in contemporary art fairs, galleries, and curated exhibitions. He has been represented by Art People Gallery (San Francisco) since 2004.

He has been profiled in Art Business News and The Guild Sourcebook of Residential Art.

== Exhibitions ==
The following is a list of selected exhibitions:

=== United States ===
- 2011 – Miami Red Dot Art Fair, Miami, FL
- 2010 – New York Art Expo, New York, NY
- 2007 – ABRA Gallery, Los Angeles, CA
- 2004–Present – Art People Gallery, San Francisco, CA
- 1999 – Hilton Fremont, CA
- 1989 – Art Expo, Los Angeles, CA
- 1988 – Art Expo, Los Angeles, CA
- 1987 – Art Expo, Los Angeles, CA

=== Europe ===
- 1983 – Doddoit Gallery, Paris, France
- 1982 – Est O Vest Gallery, Rome, Italy
- 1982 – Burdek AC Gallery, Zurich, Switzerland
- 1982 – Russo Gallery, Rome, Italy
- 1981 – Traghetto Gallery, Venice, Italy
- 1981 – Center Comunitario, Florence, Italy
- 1981 – Center Open Art, Milan, Italy
- 1980 – Arttits ABA, Florence, Italy
- 1978 – Festival of Art, Florence, Italy

== Digital and NFT works ==
Meamar is active in the digital art space and has released NFT works as part of the Meamorphism collection.
