= Ahvaz =

Capital of Khuzestan province, Iran

Ahvaz اهواز
- City
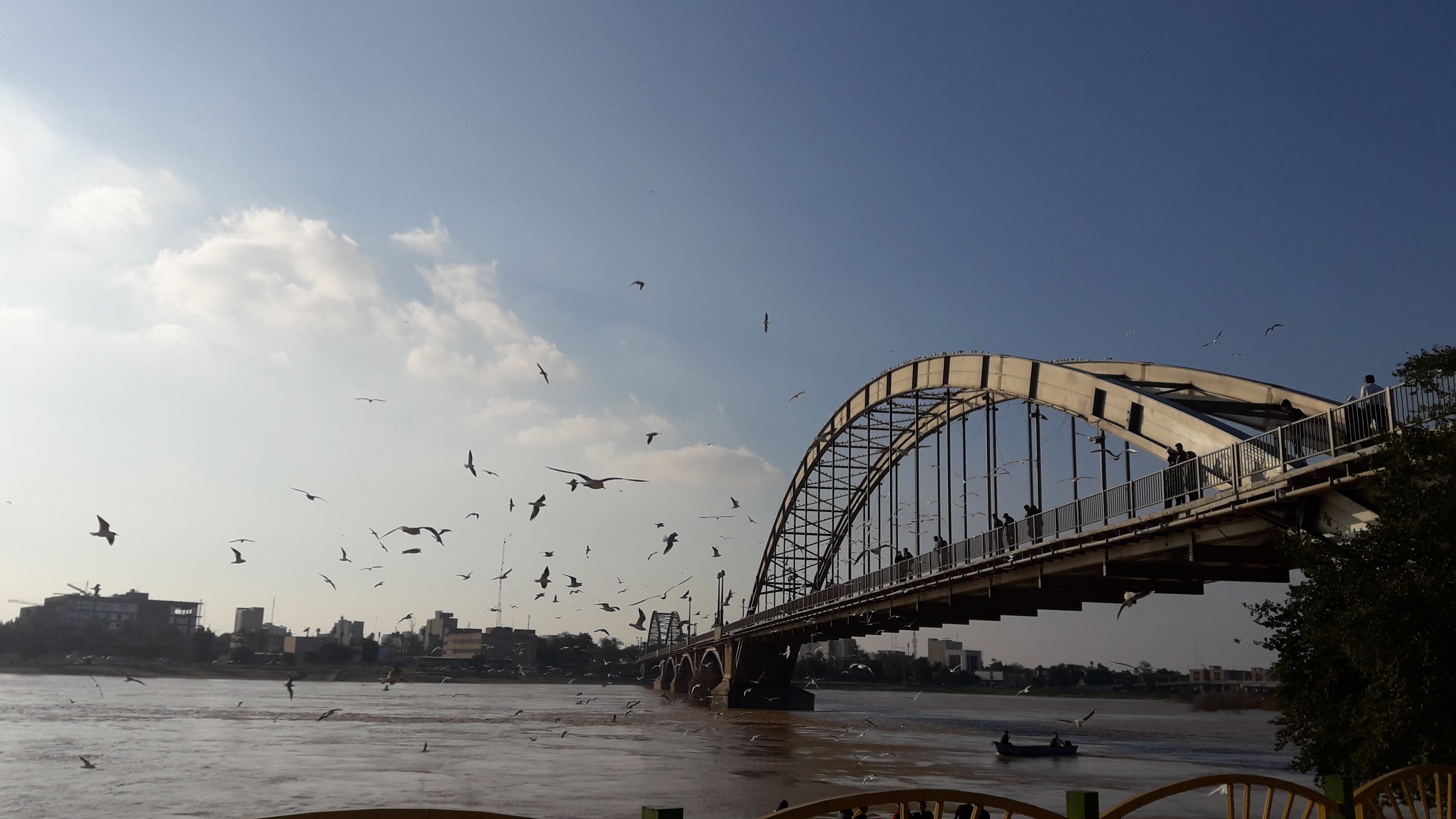
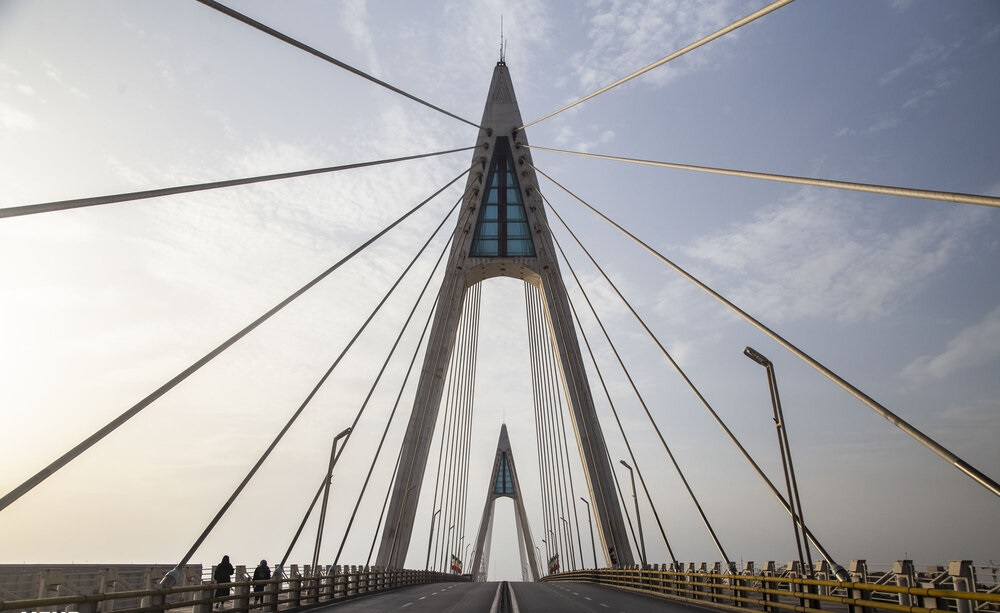
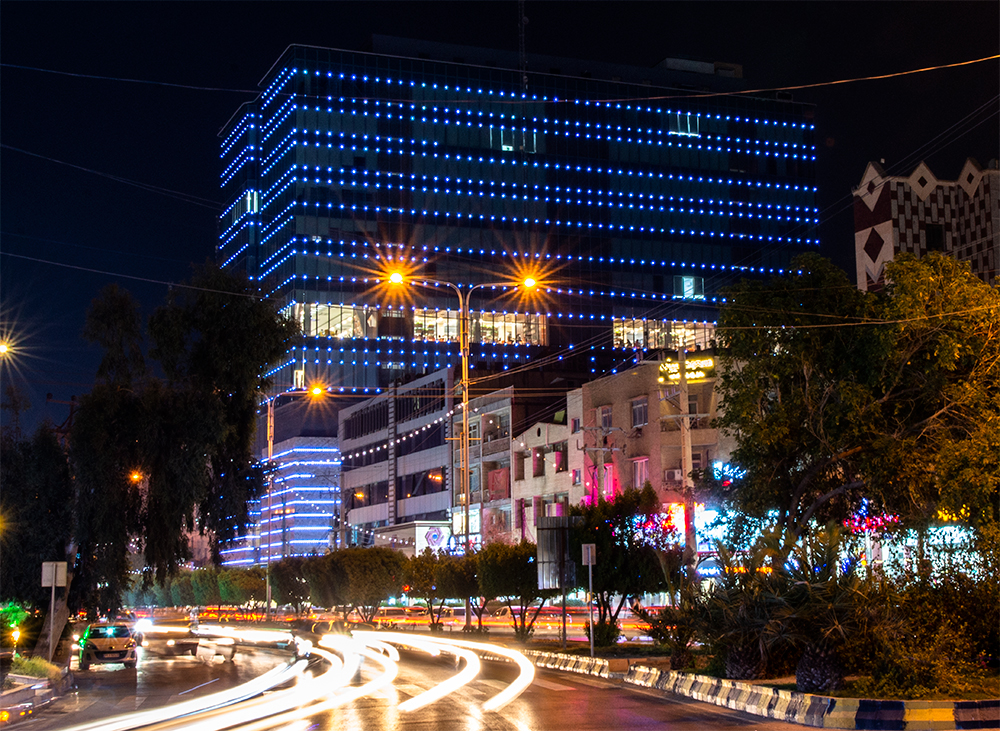
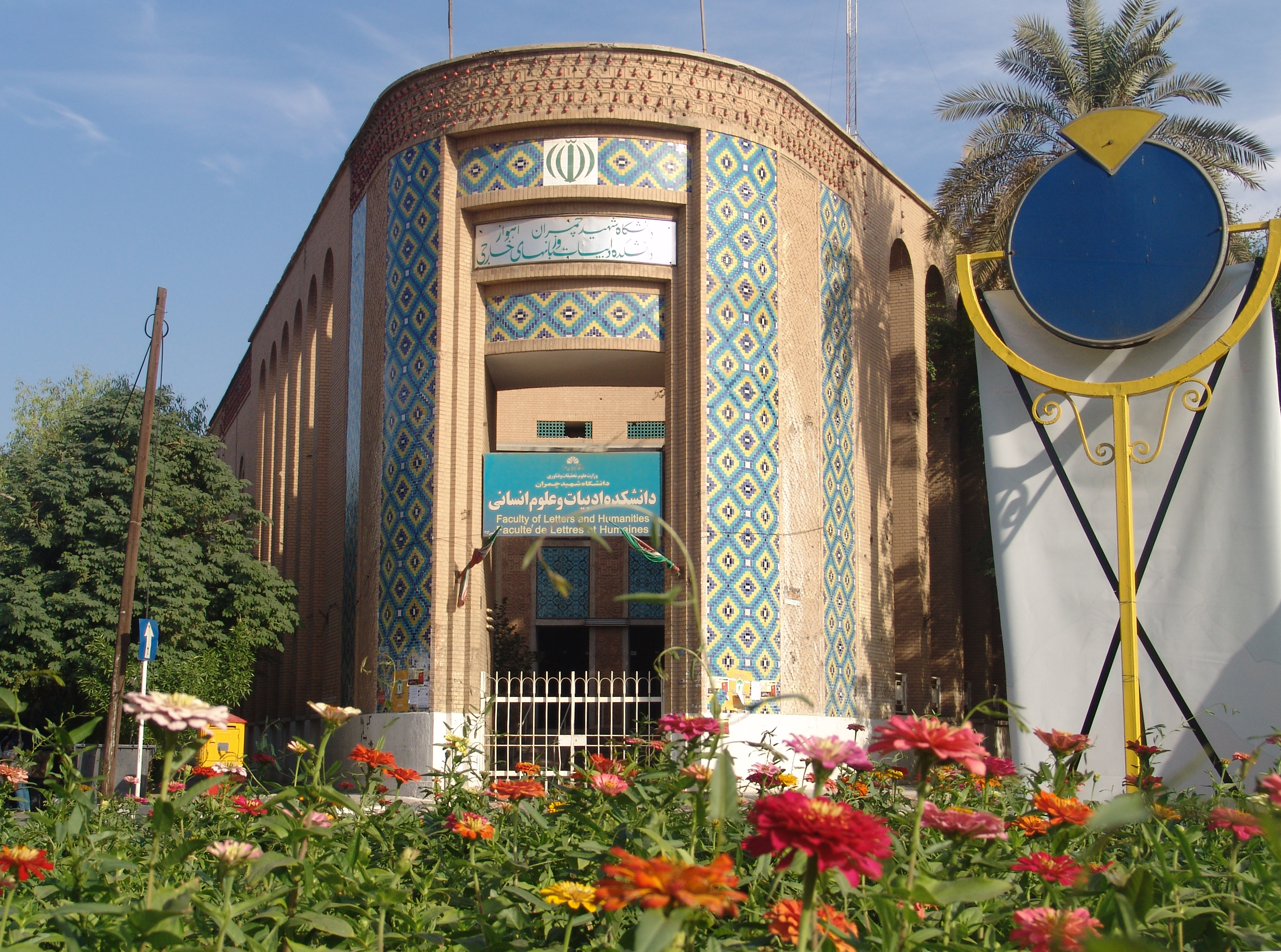
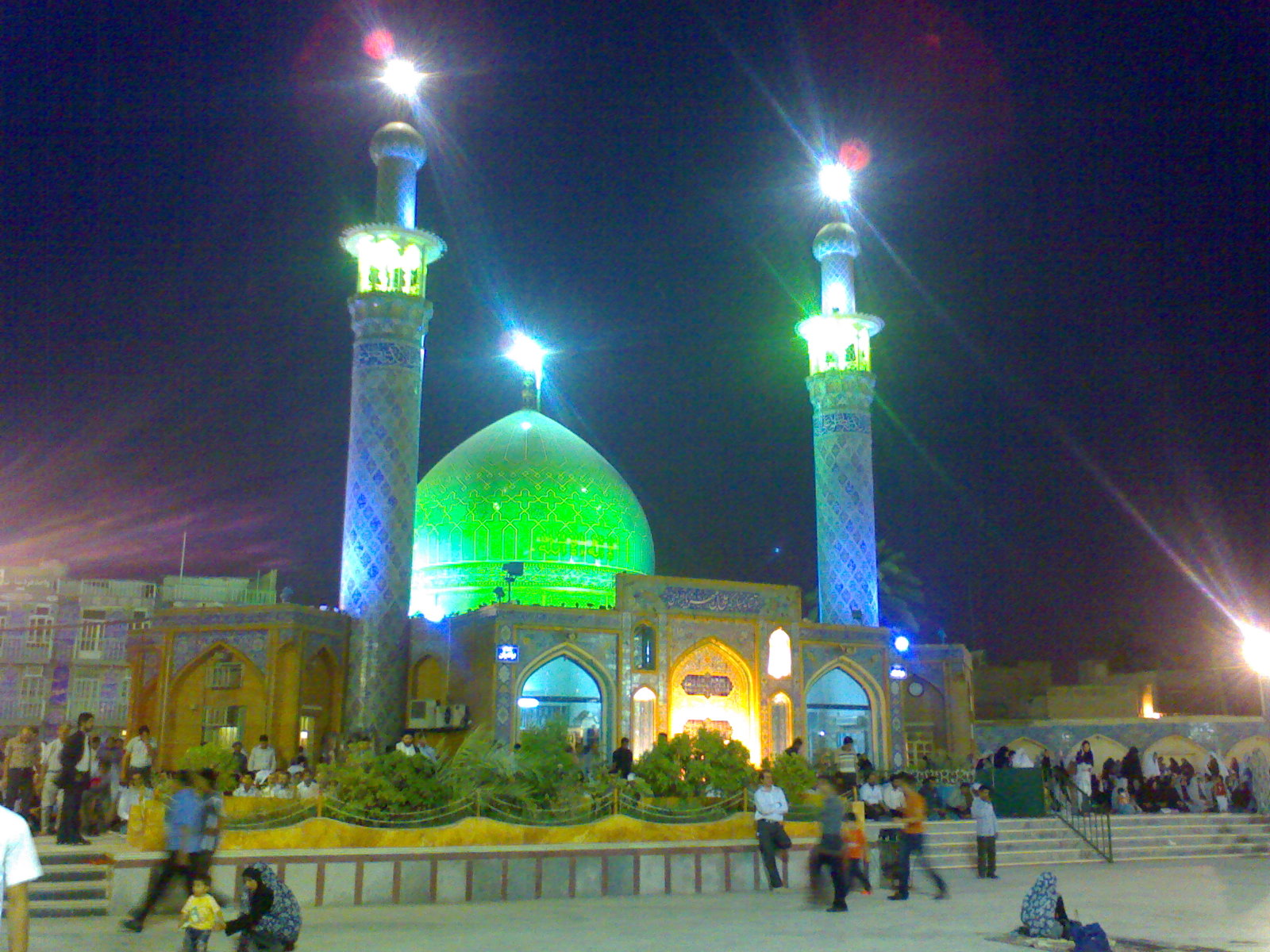
- From top, clockwise: the Pol Sefid bridge, the Ahvaz Tashrifat Complex, the Ali ibn Mahziar Ahvazi Shrine, Faculty of Literature and Humanities, Pol Hashtom

- Seal
- Nickname: The City of Bridges
- Location within Iran
- Coordinates: 31°18′17″N 48°40′42″E
- Country: Iran
- Province: Khuzestan
- County: Ahvaz
- District: Central

Government
  - Mayor: Hojjatollah Dehdashti

Area
  - Total: 220 km^{2} (85 sq mi)
- Elevation: 16 m (52 ft)

Population (2025)
  - Estimate: 1,452,000
  - Density: 6,400/km^{2} (16,500/sq mi)
- Demonym: Ahvazi
- Time zone: UTC+3:30 (IRST)
- Postal code: 61xxx
- Area code: (+98) 61
- Climate: BWh
- Website: www.ahvaz.ir

Ahvaz (Persian: اهواز; [ʔæhˈvɒːz]) (Note: Also romanized as Ahvâz and Ahwaz) is a city in the Central District of Ahvaz County, Khuzestan province, Iran, serving as capital of the province, the county, and the district.

Positioned near the border with Iraq, along the banks of the Karun River, Ahvaz serves as a key industrial and transportation hub, with a diverse population and a history shaped by its proximity to Iraq and the Persian Gulf.

Ahvaz is home to over 1.3 million people within its metropolitan area. Census results suggest a steady increase in population. It is home to Persians, Arabs and other groups such as Qashqai and Kurds. Languages spoken in the area include Persian, Khuzestāni Arabic, Southern Kurdish, Neo-Mandaic, and dialects such as Bakhtiari, Dezfuli and Shushtari.

The Karun, the largest river in Iran by volume, flows through the center of the city. It is one of two navigable rivers in Iran, alongside the Arvand Rud.

Ahvaz has earned the reputation of being the City of Bridges due to its numerous big bridges built on the Karun to facilitate better communication between the east and west parts of the city, although since the beginning of the 20th century, this city has always been known as the Oil Capital of Iran, along with other cities of Khuzestan province.

This city has a long history, dating back to the Achaemenid period. In ancient times, the city was one of the main centers of the Academy of Gondishapur.

== Etymology ==
The city known today as Ahvaz was first recognized as an urban settlement in ancient times under the name Taryana. This name clearly reflects “Dāryāna” derived from “Dāryān” the legendary name of Darius, and also refers to a powerful dynasty of Persian kings that ruled after the Achaemenid period.

Taryana was located along a section of the Royal Road that stretched from Persepolis to Sardis, with part of the royal route crossing the Karun River in Taryana (present-day Ahvaz). Later, during the reign of Ardashir I (Ardashir Babakan), Taryana expanded and was renamed “Hormazd-Ardeshir” (Persian: هُرمَزد اردشیر) in New Persian, being reestablished on both sides of the river. The first part of the name honored "God," while the second part was named after the king himself. The name was later abbreviated to “Darawashir”, but it is unclear if this change was made by Ardashir I in 230 (cf. Encyclopædia Iranica, al-Maqdisi, et al.) or by his grandson Hormizd I according to the Middle Persian Shahrestan-haye Iranshahr. The king built a dam over the Karun River in the city, which increased its significance, and soon Darawashir became the capital of the province of Susiana (modern-day Khuzestan).

The commercial center of Susiana, located on one side of the river in Darawashir (Darāvāshīr, east of the city, spanning the area from present-day Khorram Kushk to the present-day “Chaharrah Zand”), was known as "Hūǰestān-vāčār" (“the market of the Huzestan”). The other side of the river, serving as the administrative and aristocratic center (west of Ahvaz, covering the area of present-day Amaniyeh, Lashkar, and Lashkarābād), was called Horamshir.

According to the research of numerous historians, including Clifford Bosworth in the Encyclopædia Iranica, Vladimir Minorsky, Svat Soucek, and Abdolmajid Arfaei, the names Ahvaz and Khuzestan share a common origin and are both derived from the name of the ancient people who inhabited this region, the Uzi (Greek: Uxii).

Uji (also spelled Uzi) was given to a warrior tribe in the province of Susiana. It is recorded in Old Persian as 'Uvaja' (Persian: اووَجَه / اووَژه, romanized: uvaja/uvja) and in Assyrian cuneiform inscriptions as 'Huzi'. Later, Greek historians recorded it as 'Ouxioi' (Persian: اوکسی), and Arab writers recorded it as 'Khūzī' years later.

The name of today's Khuzestan province is derived from their ethnonym through phonetic transformation and Persianization (Huzistan, “the land of the Huzi”). In Syriac Christian writings, the name of the city appears as Beth Huzaye.

When the Muslims defeated the Sasanian Empire in the 7th century CE, the second part of the city (Horamshir) was destroyed. The Arabs translated the name of the remaining part of the city, the Hūǰestān-vāčār as Sūq al-Ahvāz.

The name of “Ahvaz” is the Arabicized plural form of the word "Huzi", following the af‘āl (Arabic: افعال) pattern. Thus, “Hūzīs” became “Ahvāz”. The Huzis, who were likely descendants of the Elamites, were the indigenous inhabitants of the Khuzestan region. Their language, known as the Huzi language, remained in use in Khuzestan until the Sasanian period and even for centuries after the Muslim conquest and subsequent rule in Iran. Over time, due to varying pronunciations across different languages and dialects, the name of the province evolved from Hūzistān to Khuzestān.

During the Qajar period, under Naseroddin Shah, the name of Ahvaz was changed to 'Nāseriyeh'. However, in September 1935, by approval of the Council of Ministers, the city was once again officially named Ahvaz.

== History ==
=== 20th century ===
In the 19th century, "Ahvaz was no more than a small borough inhabited mainly by Sabeans (1500 to 2000 inhabitants according to Ainsworth in 1835; 700 according to Curzon in 1890)."

In the 1880s, in late Qajar Iran, the Karun was dredged and reopened to commerce. A newly built railway crossed the Karun at Ahvaz. The city again became a commercial crossroads, linking river and rail traffic. The construction of the Suez Canal further stimulated trade. A port city was built near the old village of Ahvaz and named Bandar-e-Naseri in honour of Naser al-Din Shah Qajar.

Oil was found near Ahvaz in the early 20th century, and the city once again grew and prospered as a result of this newfound wealth. From 1897 to 1925, the city of Ahvaz was under the control of a Qajar prince, who served as governor, and Reza-Gholi Khan Sarhang, the commander of the Khuzestan army. Khaz'al al-Ka'bi was recognized by Mozaffar ad-Din Shah Qajar as hereditary ruler of the Emirate of Muhammara, Sardar Asad Bakhtiari, as the most powerful leader of the Bakhtiari people. He had power and authority over most regions of Khuzestan, such as Dezful, Shushtar, Izeh, even Ahvaz and Amir Mojahede Bakhtiari in Ramhormoz and Behbahan. At this time, the newly founded Ahvaz was named Nâseri in honour of its founder Nasser ed-Din Shah Qajar. Afterwards, during Pahlavi Iran, it resumed its old name, Ahvaz. The government of Khuzestan province was transferred there from Shushtar in 1926. The Trans-Iranian Railway reached Ahvaz in 1929 and by World War II, Ahvaz had become the principal built-up area of the interior of Khūzestān. Professional segregation remained well marked between various groups in that period still feebly integrated: Persians, sub-groupings of Persians and Arabs. Natives of Isfahan Province held an important place in retail trade, as owners of cafes and hotels, and as craftsmen.

During World War II, in July 1942, a camp for Polish refugees was established in Ahvaz (see also Iran–Poland relations). Some 4,000 Poles were housed there as of May 1943.

Iraq attempted to annex Khuzestan and Ahvaz in 1980, resulting in the Iran–Iraq War (1980–1988). Ahvaz was close to the front lines and suffered severely during the war. Iraq had hoped to exacerbate ethnic tensions and win over popular support for the invaders. Most accounts say that the Arabs of Khuzestan resisted the Iraqis rather than welcome them as liberators. However, some Iranian Arabs claim that as a minority, they face discrimination from the central government; they agitate for the right to preserve their cultural and linguistic distinction and more provincial autonomy. See Politics of Khuzestan.

In 1989, the Foolad Ahvaz steel facility was built near the town. This company is best known for its company-sponsored football club, Foolad F.C., which was the champion of Iran's Premier Football League in 2005.

In 2005, the city witnessed a series of bombings. Many government sources relate these events to developments in Iraq, accusing foreign governments of organizing and funding Arab separatist groups. The Arab Struggle Movement for the Liberation of Ahvaz claimed credit for several of the bombings, including four bombs on 12 June 2005, that killed 8 people. Gunmen killed at least 29 people at the Ahvaz military parade attack on 22 September 2018.

=== 2025–2026 Iranian protests ===
During the 2025–2026 Iranian protests, the city of Ahvaz also witnessed protest gatherings and clashes between protesters and security forces. On 2 January 2026, Iraqi militias affiliated with the Iranian government had recruited forces to assist Iranian security forces in suppressing protests in Iran. According to the report, the troops were assembled at a base in Ahvaz before being deployed to various regions to support protest suppression efforts.

On 10 January, protests and demonstrations were held in Ahvaz. According to reports, some streets were blocked during the protests, and following clashes between protesters and security forces, the Ahvaz governorate building caught fire.

On 16 January, scattered protests and clashes were reported in various neighborhoods and areas of the city. On 17 January, a group of shopkeepers and citizens held a protest gathering in the Grand Bazaar of Ahvaz, after which a number of shops were closed.

On 18 January, a protest gathering took place in the Naderi area and was dispersed by security forces using tear gas. Clashes were also reported on 19 January, in the Golestan area. According to reports, security forces opened fire in order to prevent protesters from approaching certain government buildings.

In addition, reports indicated that plainclothes forces confronted protest gatherings in the "Zeitoun Karmandi" and central bazaar areas, leading to the arrest of several protesters. During these events, law enforcement forces reportedly retreated to the "Boostan" intersection in the "Kuy-e Saadi" neighborhood. The use of drones by security forces to monitor and control protests was also reported.

On 21 and 22 January, protests and clashes continued in parts of the city, and several protesters were arrested. On Monday night, nighttime protests accompanied by clashes were reported on Naderi Street, 24-Metri Street, and in the "Abdolhamid Bazaar", where security forces blocked several roads using concrete barriers.

On 23 January, nighttime protests in the "Golestan", "Saadi", and "Goldasteh" neighborhoods were met with security force intervention. According to reports, live ammunition and pellet guns were used during the clashes, resulting in the deaths and injuries of a number of protesters.

=== 2026 Iran war ===
On 7 April 2026, city residents witnessed repeated fighter jet activity.

== Demographics ==
It is common to encounter people from various ethnic groups while strolling through Ahvaz's streets and markets.

Historical population

Year	Pop.	±% p.a.
1956	120,098	—
1966	206,375	+5.56%
1976	334,399	+4.94%
1986	579,826	+5.66%
1991	724,653	+4.56%

Year	Pop.	±% p.a.
1996	804,980	+2.12%
2006	969,843	+1.88%
2011	1,112,021	+2.77%
2016	1,184,788	+1.28%

=== Languages ===
Persian serves as the official language and is widely spoken across Ahvaz. Many Ahvazis are bilingual, speaking both Persian and one of the following languages/dialects. The Arabic spoken in Ahvaz is a variety of Khuzestani Arabic. Another part of Ahvazis speak the Bakhtiari dialect. Neo-Mandaic, one of the Neo-Aramaic languages, is also spoken among the Mandaeans of Ahvaz. It is a descendant of the Mandaic language partially influenced by Khuzestani Persian.

== Bridges ==
There are 9 bridges over the Karun river.

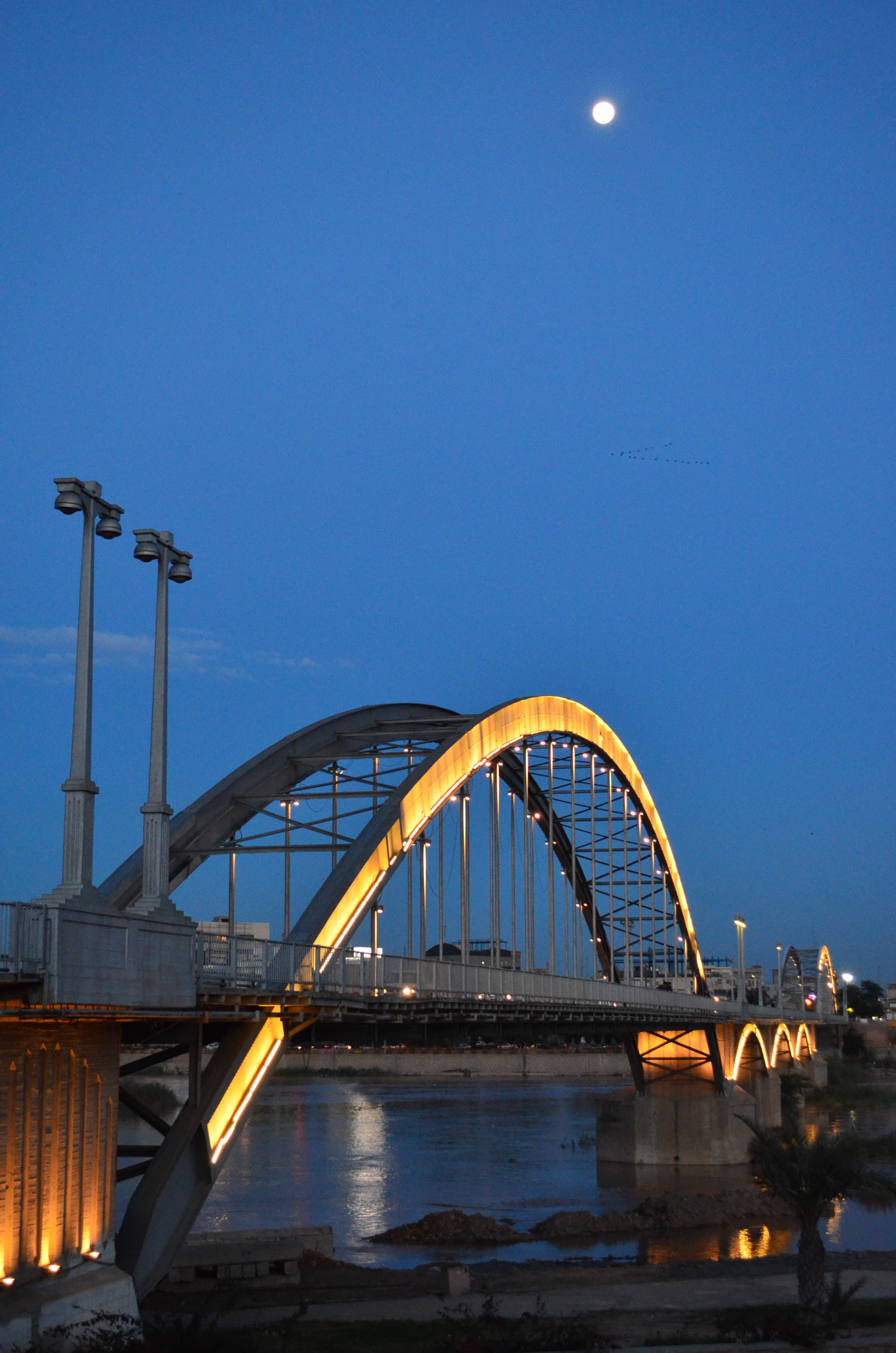
Pol Sefid

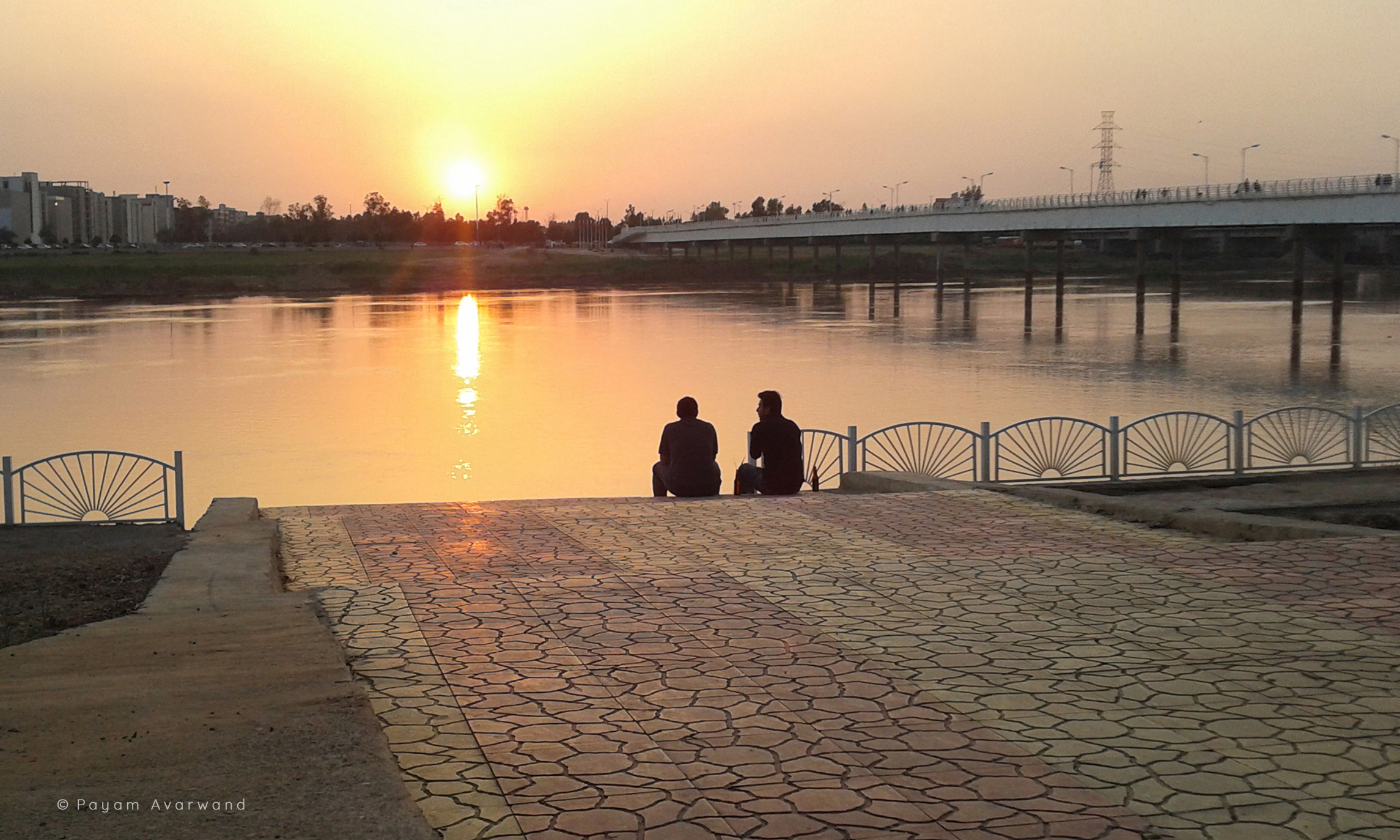
One of the attractions of Ahvaz is its beautiful urban sunset

=== Pol Siah ===
The Pol Siah (Black Bridge), also known as the Victory Bridge, was the first modern bridge over the Karun River. The bridge was built during World War II and used to supply the Allies in the Soviet Union and had a major impact on Allied victory.

=== Pol Sefid ===
Pol Sefid (White Bridge) is an arch bridge completed on 21 September 1936 and inaugurated on 6 November 1936. The bridge remains a symbol of the city still today. The White Bridge has two suspension spans with lengths of 136 and 130 meters and three arched spans with a length of 49 meters, which makes the total length of the bridge 501 meters. The bridge was built by the Swedish company Skanska.

=== Pol Hashtom ===
Pol Hashtom is the eighth intra-urban bridge in Ahvaz. It is the largest cable bridge in the Middle East. Construction started in February 2006 and ended in March 2012. The bridge connects the Amaniyeh area and Takht-e Soleyman street, which are located west of the Karun river, with Zand street, which is located east of this river.

=== Other ===
The other 6 bridges are third bridge, Naderi bridge, Fifth bridge, Sixth bridge, Seventh bridge (also named Dialogue among civilizations bridge), Cable bridge, and Ninth bridge.

== Geography ==
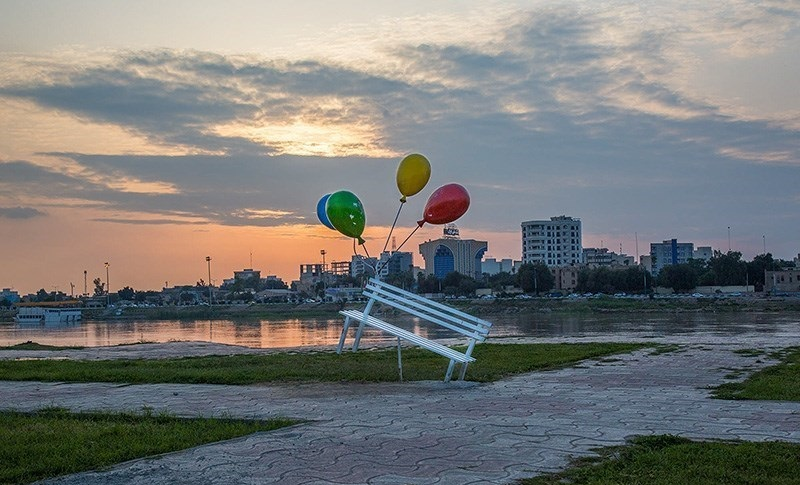
Ahvaz and the Karun during the COVID-19 pandemic lockdown

Ahvaz lies on the Khuzestan plain at 31°30′ north latitude and 48°40′ east longitude, at an elevation of 12 m (39 ft) above sea level. Much of Khuzestan province consists of such plains.

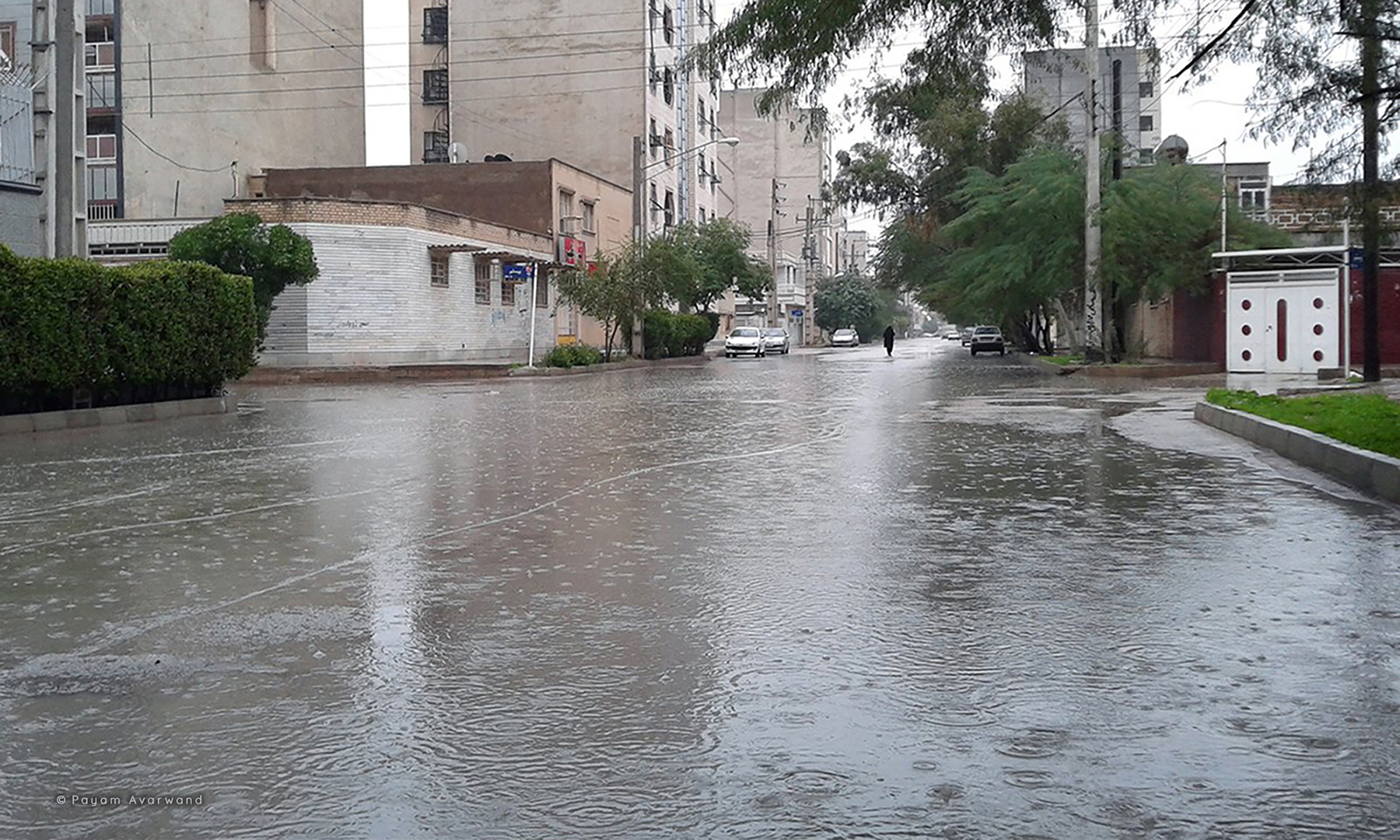
Kianabad, 2012

The city has a hot desert climate (Köppen climate classification: BWh), with long, hot summers and short, mild winters. Summer temperatures regularly reach at least 45 °C (113 °F) and sometimes exceed 50 °C (122 °F), and sandstorms and duststorms are common. The highest reading on record, 53.7 °C (128.7 °F), was set on 29 June 2017; the dew point that day peaked at 23 °C (73 °F), unusually humid for the city's typically dry heat. In July 2022, NASA listed Ahvaz among the hottest cities in the world.

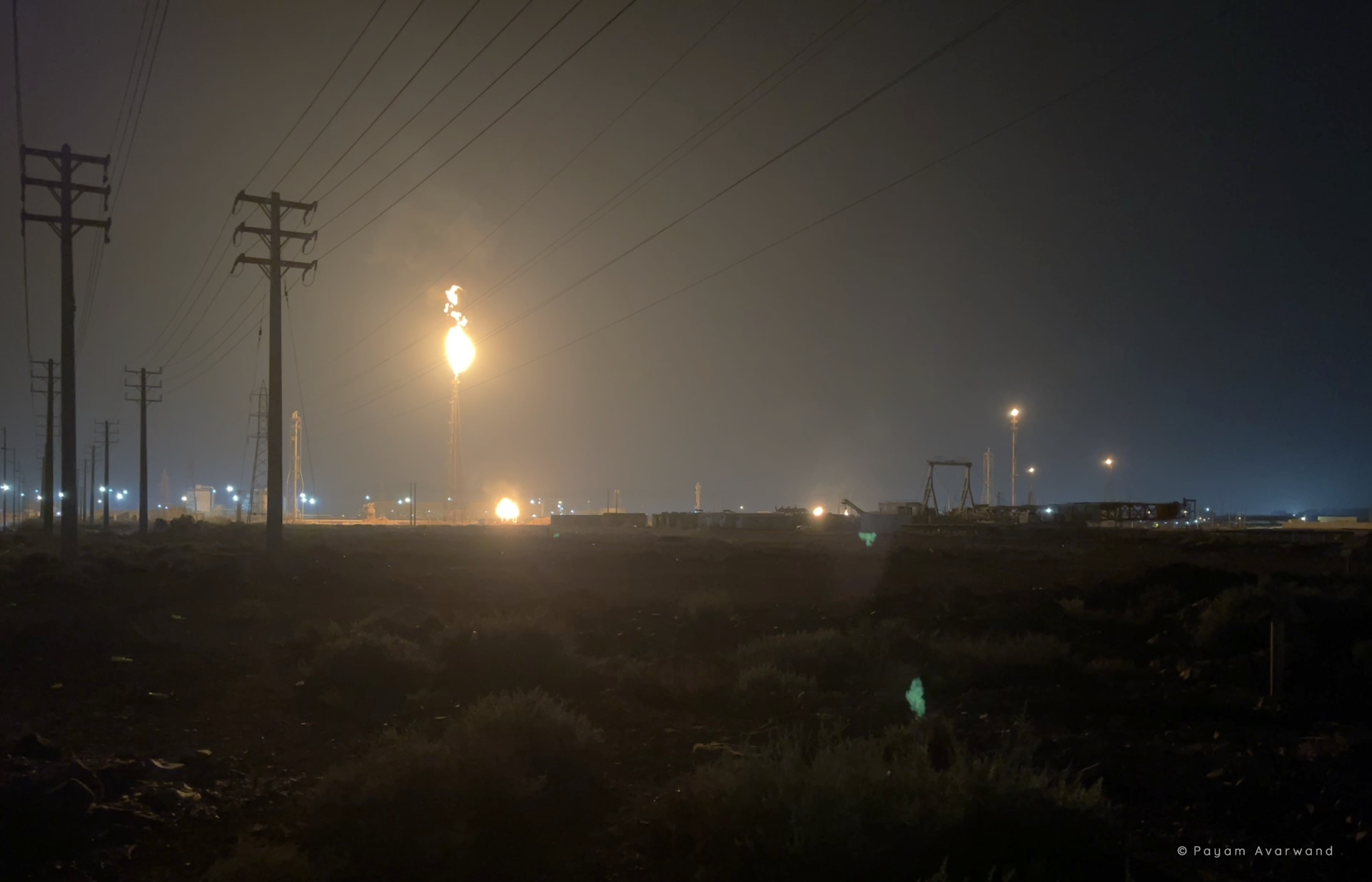
A flare stack in Ahvaz. Incomplete combustion releases soot, a known carcinogen.

Winter minima fall to around 5 °C (41 °F), though frost has been recorded in every winter month as well as in early spring and late autumn. The record low of −7.0 °C (19.4 °F) was set during the exceptionally cold winter of 1963–64, when freezing temperatures persisted for several nights and frost reached many normally hot Iranian cities. Average annual precipitation is about 219 mm (8.6 in).

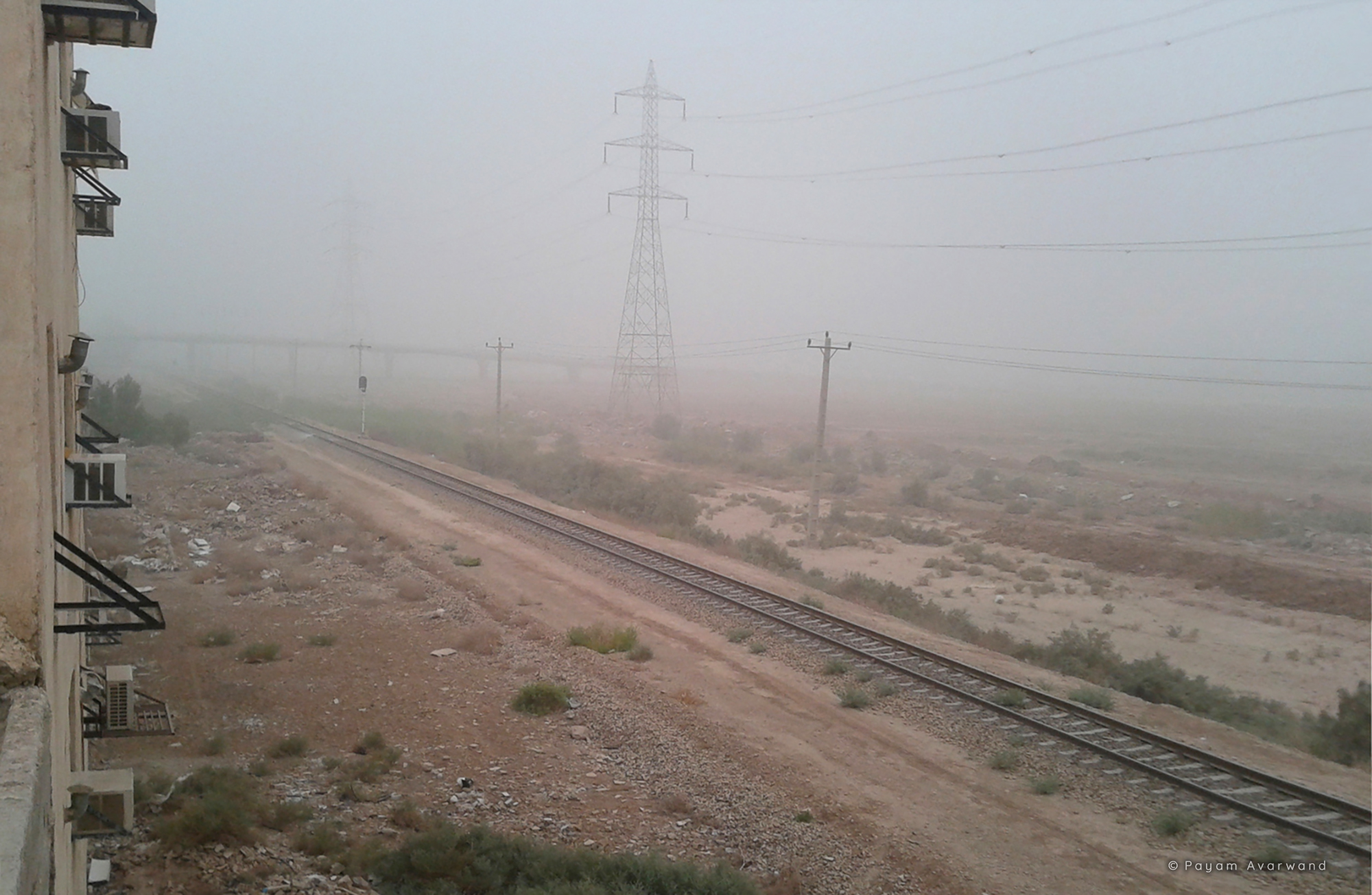
Dust storms in Ahvaz - present-day Mehrshahr - 2012

Climate data for Ahvaz (1991-2020, extremes 1951-2025)
Month	Jan	Feb	Mar	Apr	May	Jun	Jul	Aug	Sep	Oct	Nov	Dec	Year
Record high °C (°F)	28.0 (82.4)	31.5 (88.7)	40.5 (104.9)	44.8 (112.6)	49.5 (121.1)	53.7 (128.7)	52.4 (126.3)	51.6 (124.9)	50.0 (122.0)	45.0 (113.0)	36.4 (97.5)	30.0 (86.0)	53.7 (128.7)
Mean maximum °C (°F)	23.4 (74.1)	26.6 (79.9)	33.7 (92.7)	40.5 (104.9)	45.9 (114.6)	48.9 (120.0)	50.4 (122.7)	50.1 (122.2)	47.6 (117.7)	41.5 (106.7)	32.1 (89.8)	25.0 (77.0)	51.2 (124.2)
Mean daily maximum °C (°F)	18.1 (64.6)	21.2 (70.2)	26.2 (79.2)	32.9 (91.2)	40.0 (104.0)	45.1 (113.2)	46.7 (116.1)	46.6 (115.9)	42.9 (109.2)	36.3 (97.3)	26.5 (79.7)	19.9 (67.8)	33.5 (92.4)
Daily mean °C (°F)	12.8 (55.0)	15.2 (59.4)	19.7 (67.5)	25.9 (78.6)	32.6 (90.7)	37.0 (98.6)	38.6 (101.5)	37.9 (100.2)	33.8 (92.8)	27.7 (81.9)	19.6 (67.3)	14.2 (57.6)	26.3 (79.3)
Mean daily minimum °C (°F)	8.0 (46.4)	9.7 (49.5)	13.6 (56.5)	19.1 (66.4)	24.7 (76.5)	28.0 (82.4)	30.1 (86.2)	29.5 (85.1)	25.3 (77.5)	20.3 (68.5)	13.9 (57.0)	9.5 (49.1)	19.3 (66.8)
Mean minimum °C (°F)	2.4 (36.3)	4.5 (40.1)	7.9 (46.2)	13.2 (55.8)	19.8 (67.6)	22.9 (73.2)	25.1 (77.2)	24.6 (76.3)	20.5 (68.9)	15.1 (59.2)	8.6 (47.5)	3.9 (39.0)	0.8 (33.4)
Record low °C (°F)	−7.0 (19.4)	−5.0 (23.0)	−1.0 (30.2)	6.0 (42.8)	13.0 (55.4)	15.0 (59.0)	19.0 (66.2)	18.0 (64.4)	13.0 (55.4)	8.0 (46.4)	0.0 (32.0)	−1.0 (30.2)	−7.0 (19.4)
Average precipitation mm (inches)	45.9 (1.81)	23.1 (0.91)	29.2 (1.15)	16.7 (0.66)	3.0 (0.12)	0.1 (0.00)	0.0 (0.0)	0.0 (0.0)	0.2 (0.01)	9.4 (0.37)	40.6 (1.60)	50.7 (2.00)	218.9 (8.63)
Average precipitation days (≥ 1.0 mm)	4.7	3.2	3.7	3.1	0.5	0.1	0	0	0	1.2	3.3	4.5	24.3
Average afternoon relative humidity (%)	72	60	50	40	27	21	24	28	30	39	56	71	43
Average dew point °C (°F)	6.9 (44.4)	6.2 (43.2)	7.0 (44.6)	9.0 (48.2)	9.1 (48.4)	8.9 (48.0)	11.9 (53.4)	13.4 (56.1)	11.3 (52.3)	10.5 (50.9)	9.1 (48.4)	8.0 (46.4)	9.3 (48.7)
Mean monthly sunshine hours	185	198	236	245	295	343	345	344	309	269	210	182	3,161
Source 1: NOAA NCEI
Source 2: Iran Meteorological Organization (records), Tutiempo (September–December record high) Ogimet (April-May record high)

=== Pollution ===
In 2011, the World Health Organization ranked Ahvaz as the world's most air-polluted city. The reason Ahvaz is so polluted is because of its oil industry. The pollution can be very dangerous, causing different types of diseases, and can be harmful to plants.

== Transportation ==
=== Roads ===
Ahvaz, the largest city in the province, is composed of two distinct districts. The newer district, which functions as the administrative and industrial centre, is situated on the right bank of the Karun River, while residential areas are located in the older section of the city, which is positioned on the left bank. The city can be accessed via the following routes, in addition to the single-runway airport:

- Ahvaz-Abadan expressway (145 km)
- Ahvaz-Andimeshk (152 km) expressway
- Ahvaz-Bandar Imam Khomeini freeway (175 km)
- Tehran-Khorramshahr national railway

=== Airport ===
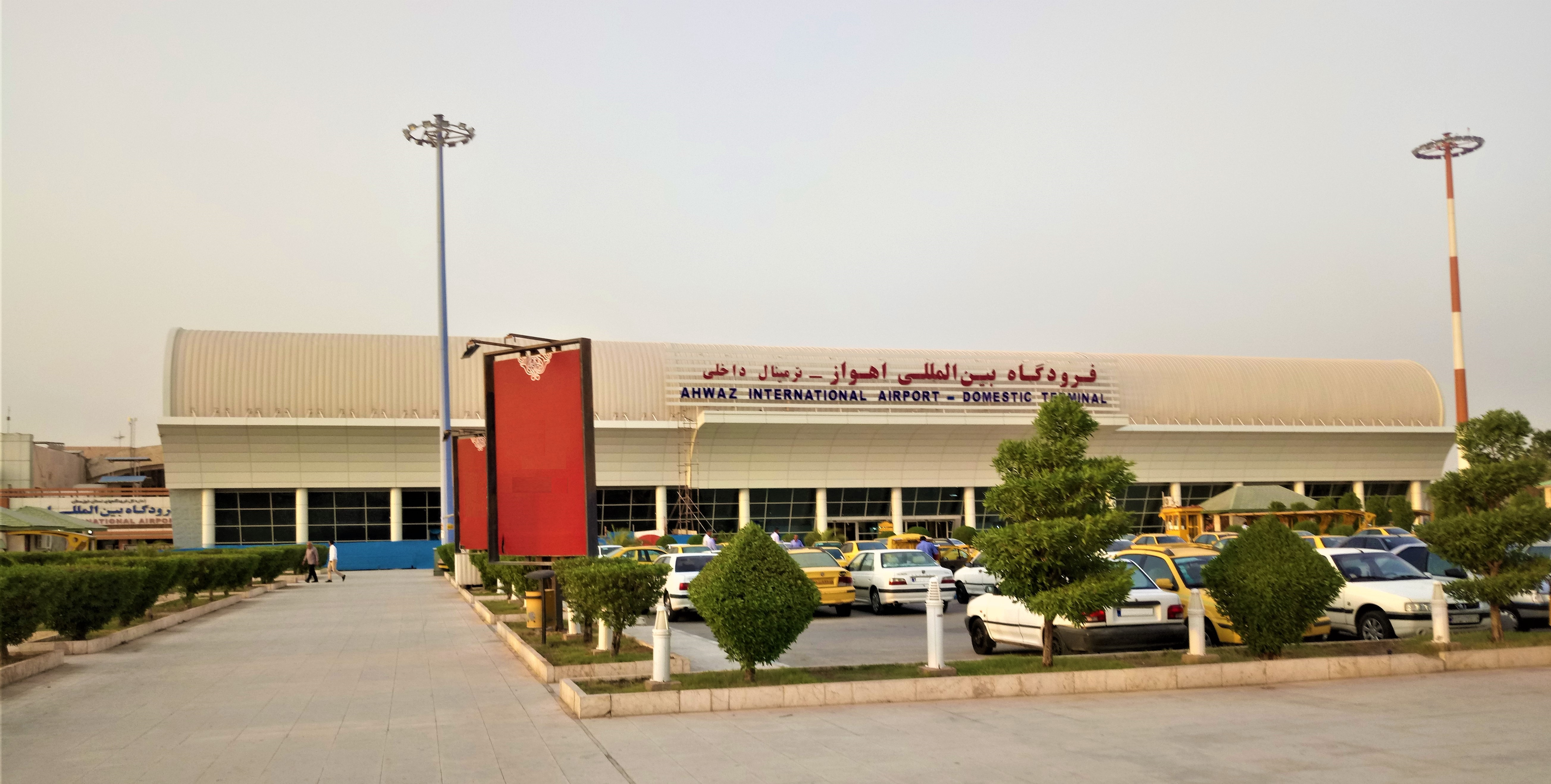
Ahvaz International Airport

Ahvaz International Airport (IATA: AWZ, ICAO: OIAW) (Persian: فرودگاه بین‌المللی اهواز) is an airport serving the city of Ahvaz, Iran. In 2016, 23,731 aircraft took off and landed at this airport, and 20,586,215 kg of cargo and 2,671,622 passengers were moved through it.

=== Railway ===
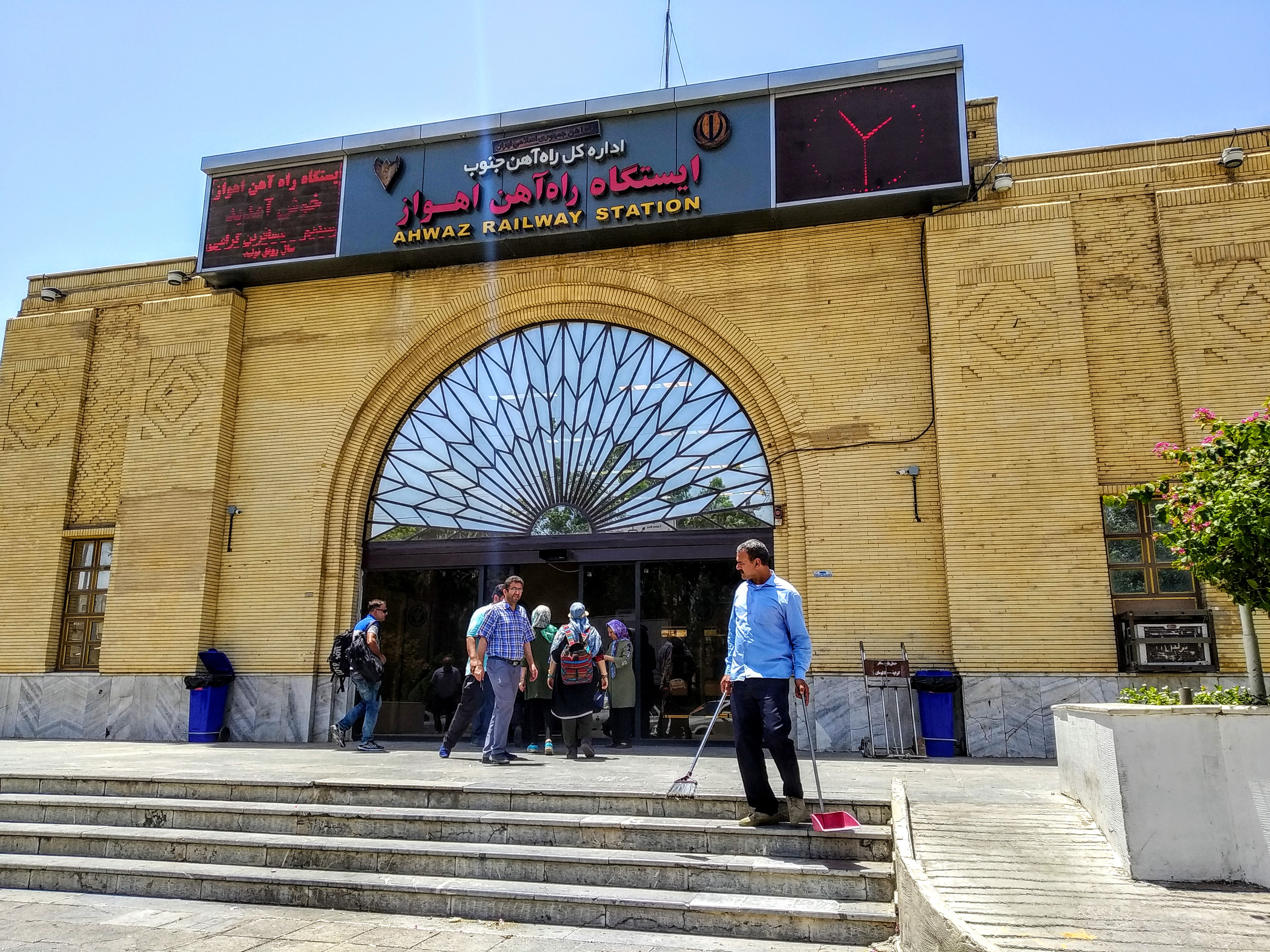
Ahvaz Railway Station.

Ahvaz railway station (Persian: ايستگاه راه آهن اهواز, Istgah-e Rah Ahan-e Ahvaz) is located in Ahvaz, Khuzestan Province.

- Ahvaz is accessible via freeways from Isfahan and Shiraz, and roadways to Tehran.
- A metro urban railway system is being built by the Ahvaz urban railway. The system is planned to have a total of four lines. Line 1 will be a 23 km underground line with 24 stations.

== Sport ==
Traditionally, Khuzestan province has been a major soccer hub in Iran. The city has two existing sport complexes: Takhti Stadium and the newly constructed Ghadir Stadium. There are several other smaller complexes for martial arts, swimming pools and gymnasiums. Also, a new privately owned stadium is currently under construction by Foolad F.C. in Ahvaz.

The city has significant sports facilities, including three major stadiums:

- Takhti Stadium
- Ghadir Stadium
- Foolad Khouzestan Stadium (Foolad Arena)

=== Football ===
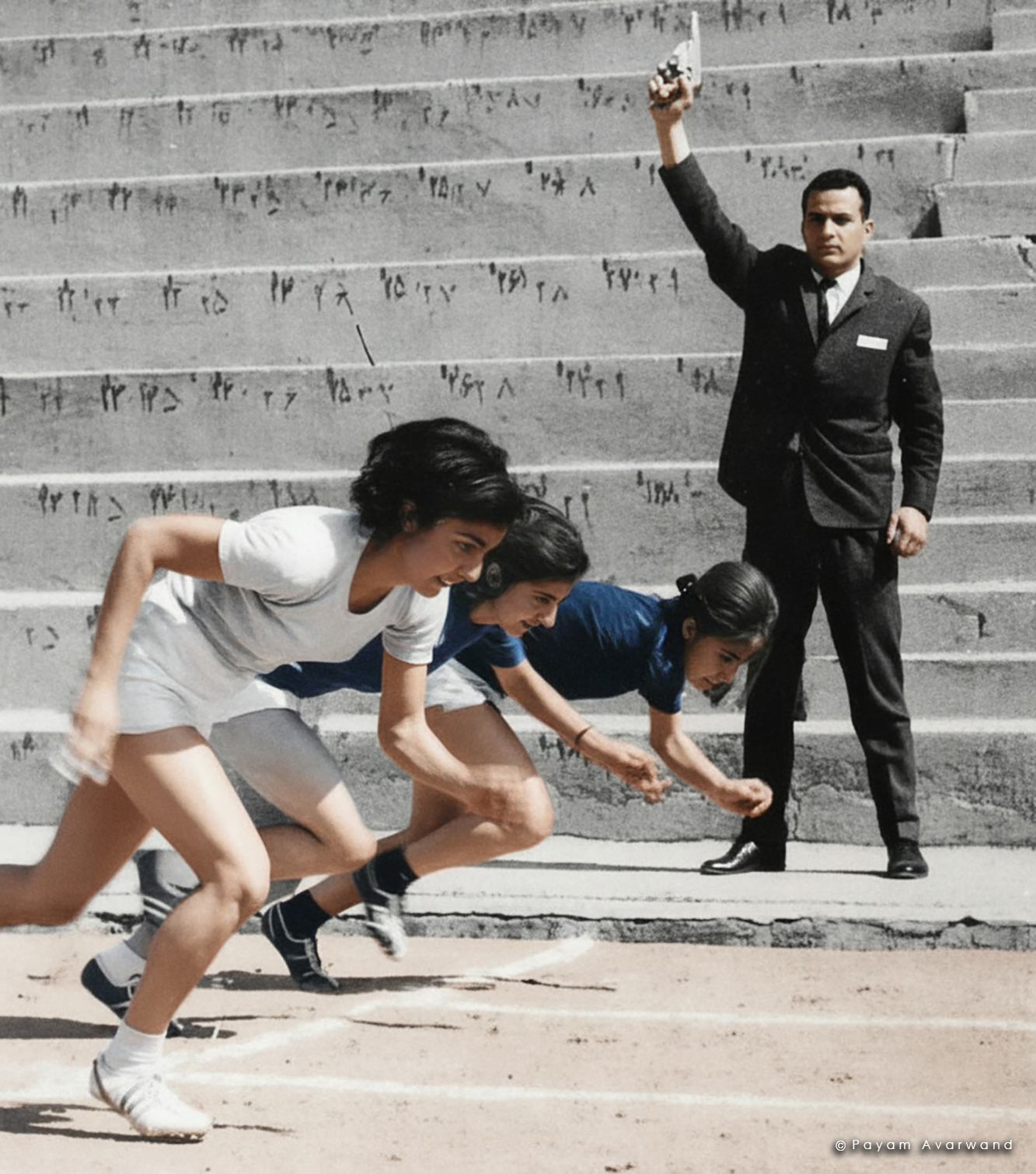
Takhti Stadium, June 1973, girls' running race

Football is a major part of the city's culture. The abundant enthusiasm has made Ahvaz home to three Iranian major Football clubs: Foolad, Esteghlal Khuzestan are currently playing in the Persian Gulf Pro League, and Esteghlal Ahvaz is playing in Azadegan League.

Foolad have won the league on two occasions, the 2013–2014 season and the 2004–2005 season. Esteghlal Ahvaz finished runners–up in the league in the 2006–2007 season. In 2016, Esteghlal Khuzestan won the league for the first time.

A number of other teams such as Foolad B the second team of Foolad and Karun Khuzestan play in the 2nd Division.

=== Futsal ===
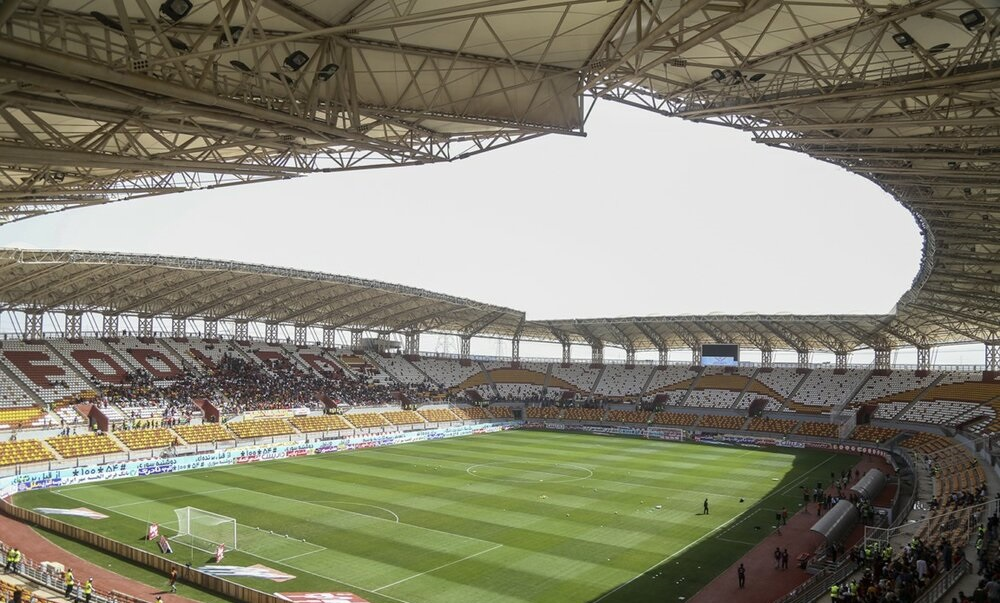
Foolad Arena, home of Foolad FC.

Ahvaz has also two teams in the Iranian Futsal Super League, which are Sherkat Melli Haffari Iran FSC and Gaz Khozestan FSC.

== Colleges and universities ==
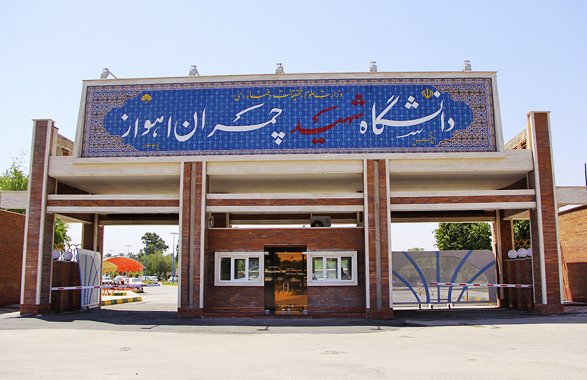
Shahid Chamran University (formerly Jundishapur)

Ahvaz occupies a prominent place in Iranian higher education owing to its large and well-regarded universities. Gondishapur University was founded on 24 September 1955 and was renamed Jundishapur shortly afterwards, keeping that name until the Islamic Revolution of 1979. The faculty of agriculture was the university's first faculty; agriculture, literature, mathematics and medicine were among the earliest subjects offered. On 15 June 1958 the first cohort of 38 graduates of the agriculture faculty received their certificates at a ceremony. The faculties of engineering and theology began operating around the start of the Islamic Revolution and the Dezful branch in 1987-88, while the remaining faculties had opened before the revolution. Given the industrial character of Khuzestan, research at Shahid Chamran University carries particular weight; its academics have produced dozens of books and translations and hundreds of research projects.

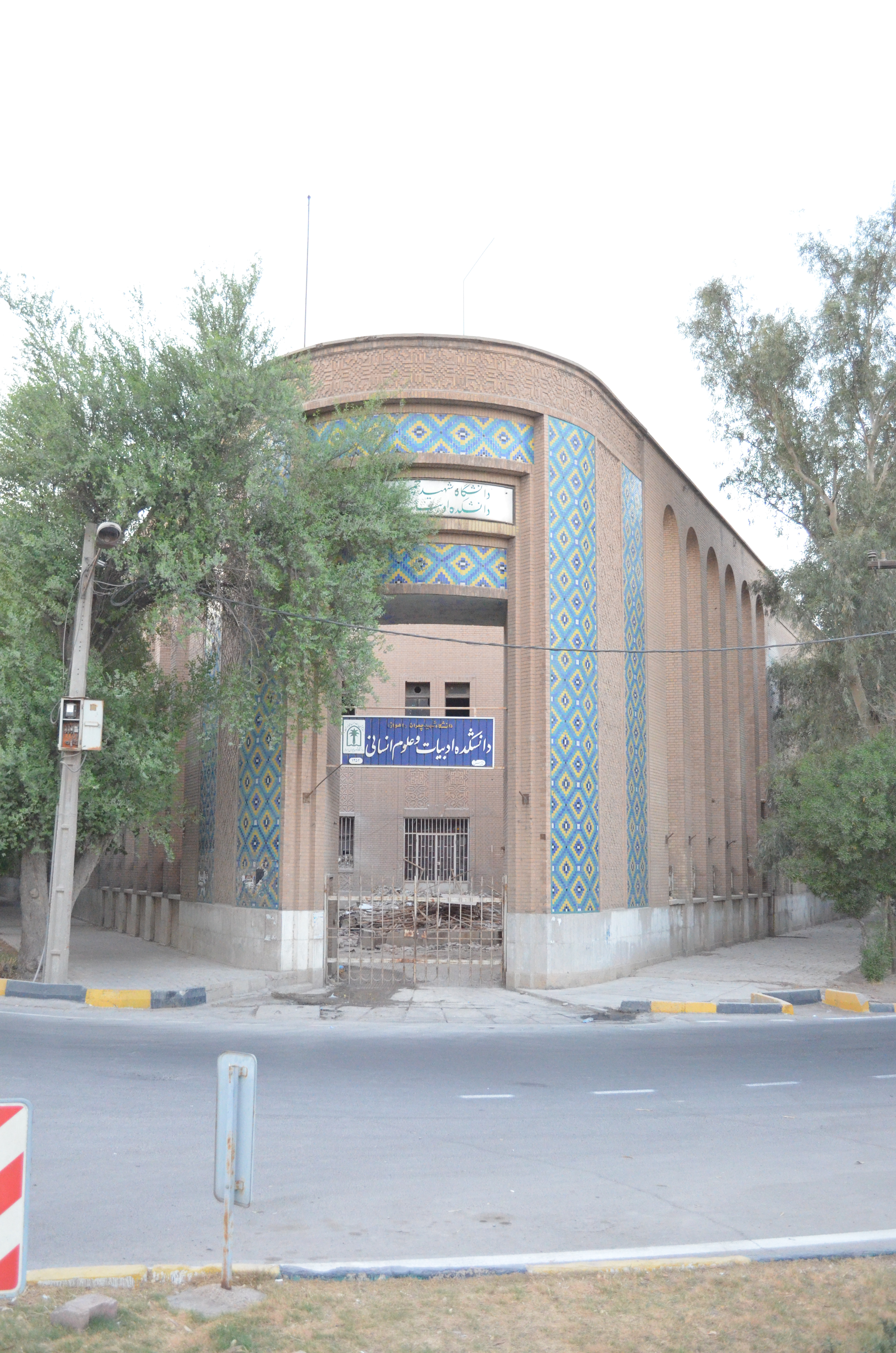
The former building of the Faculty of Literature and Humanities, Shahid Chamran University

The university today has 15 faculties and a university campus; its medical departments were spun off in the 1980s and have since formed the independent Ahvaz Jundishapur University of Medical Sciences. Bachelor's and master's programmes are offered in most subjects, with doctoral programmes additionally available in agriculture, educational sciences and psychology, mathematics, veterinary medicine and chemistry.

Shahid Chamran University of Ahvaz is the oldest institution of higher education in the city. It lies in western Ahvaz overlooking the bank of the Karun. Its faculty of literature and foreign languages is separate from the main campus and is regarded as one of the city's landmarks. According to the university, more than 14,000 students are enrolled and over 700 academic staff are employed there.

Ahvaz Jundishapur University of Medical Sciences also traces its origins to the 1955 foundation. The medical faculty, together with the other health-science departments, was separated from Jundishapur University in the mid-1980s and placed under the Ministry of Health.

Azad University, Ahvaz Branch was established on 22 December 1982 and was the first branch of the Azad University in Khuzestan province, as well as one of its first five branches nationwide. Teaching began in 1983-84 with a mathematics programme, which was discontinued after a short time; instruction resumed in January-February 1985 with civil engineering and agriculture. In 2014 the branch was merged with the Science and Research Branch of Khuzestan.

Other institutions of higher education include:

- Petroleum University of Technology
- Institute for Higher Education ACECR Khuzestan
- Khuzestan College of Water and Power Industry
- Payam-e Noor University of Ahvaz
- Imam Hossein University, Ahvaz
- Shahid Chamran Technical Higher Education Centre
- Sama Technical and Vocational College
- Khuzestan Agricultural Higher Education Complex
- Rahnama Institute of Higher Education
  Sahel Cinema
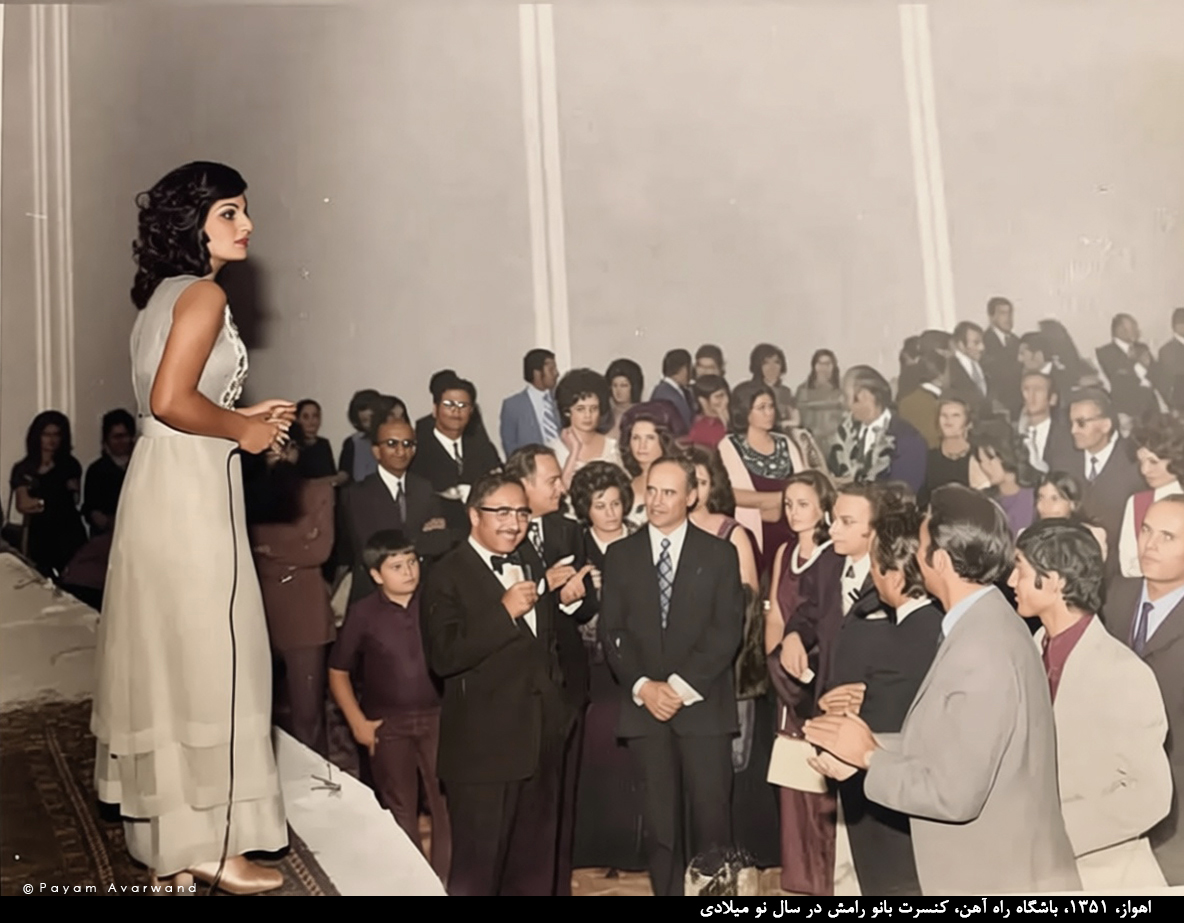
  Ramesh Concert in Ahvaz, 1972
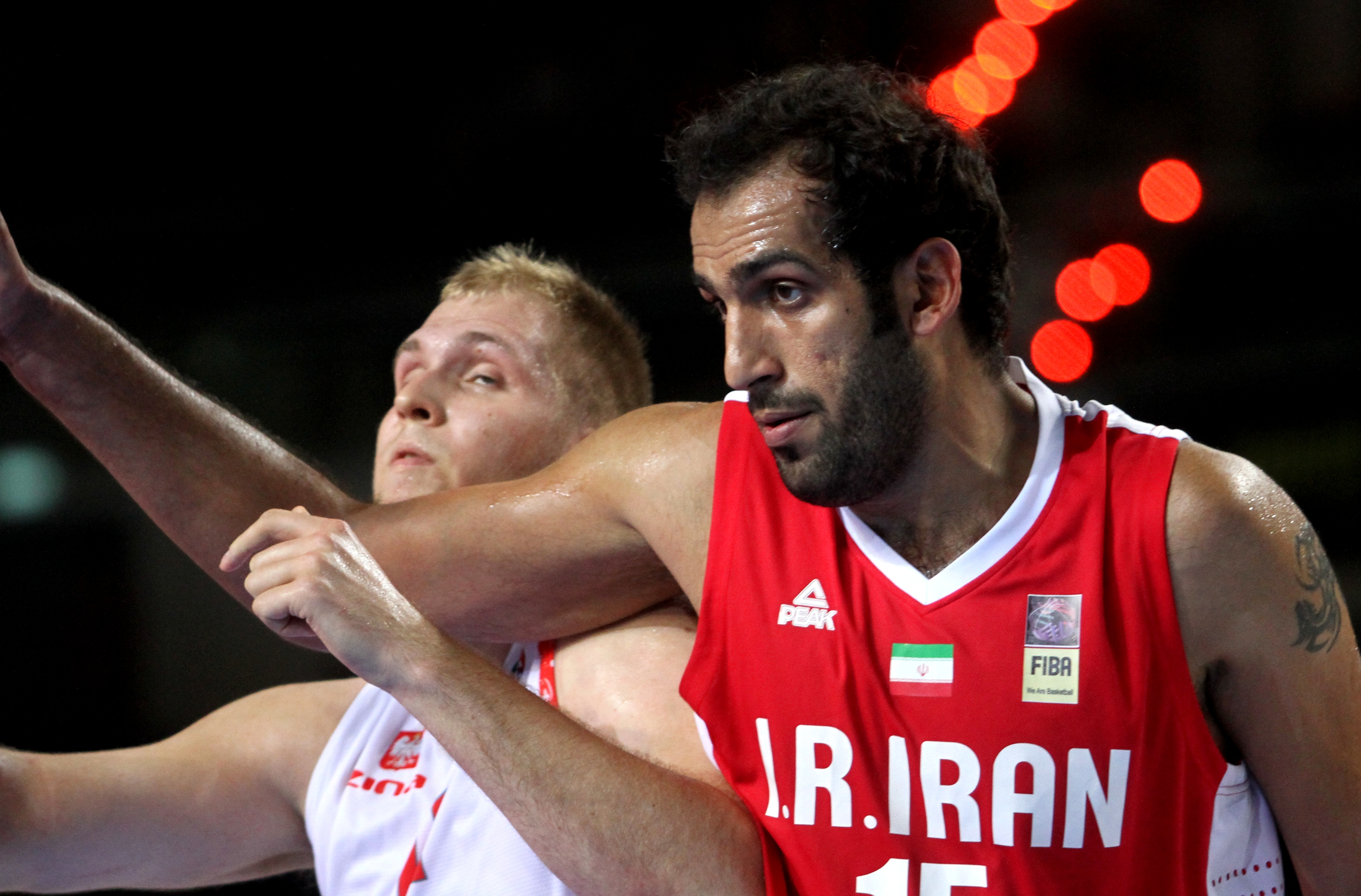
  Hamed Haddadi
- Amir al-Mo'menin University

== Notable people ==
Name	Profession
Samira Abbassy	Painter and designer
Abu Nuwas	Poet
Mohammad-Hossein Adeli	Politician
Siamak Aghaei	Santoor player
Aghasi	Singer
Sadegh Ahangaran	Singer and military figure
Yousef Alavi	Mathematician
Ahmad Alenemeh	Footballer
Sina Ataiyan Dena	Filmmaker
Kianoush Ayari	Filmmaker
Imaani Brown	Musician
Jabbar Choheili	Former leader of the Mandaeans
Mehdi Daghagheleh	Footballer
Mohammad-Reza Eskandari	Politician
Reza Fayazi	Actor
Siavash Ghomayshi	Singer and musician
Hamed Haddadi	Basketball player
Mohammad Amin Hazbavi	Footballer
Sasan Heydari (Sasy)	Singer and musician
Saleh Hosseini	Translator and critic
Majid Javanmard	Filmmaker
Hossein Kaebi	Footballer
Mehrangiz Kar	Lawyer, journalist, writer
Hossein Karimi Babadi	Athlete
Maryam Kavyani	Actress
Ahmad Mahmoud	Writer
Ali Meamar	Abstract painter
Patrick Monahan	Comedian
Pejman Montazeri	Footballer
Sina Movahed	Chess Grandmaster
Ezzatollah Negahban	Archaeologist
Trita Parsi	Author
Mehdi Rabbi	Writer
Ali Sajadi Hoseini	Filmmaker
Ali Shamkhani	Military officer and politician
Siavash Shams	Singer and musician
Amir Taheri	Journalist and political analyst
Mehdi Yarrahi	Singer and musician

== Gallery ==
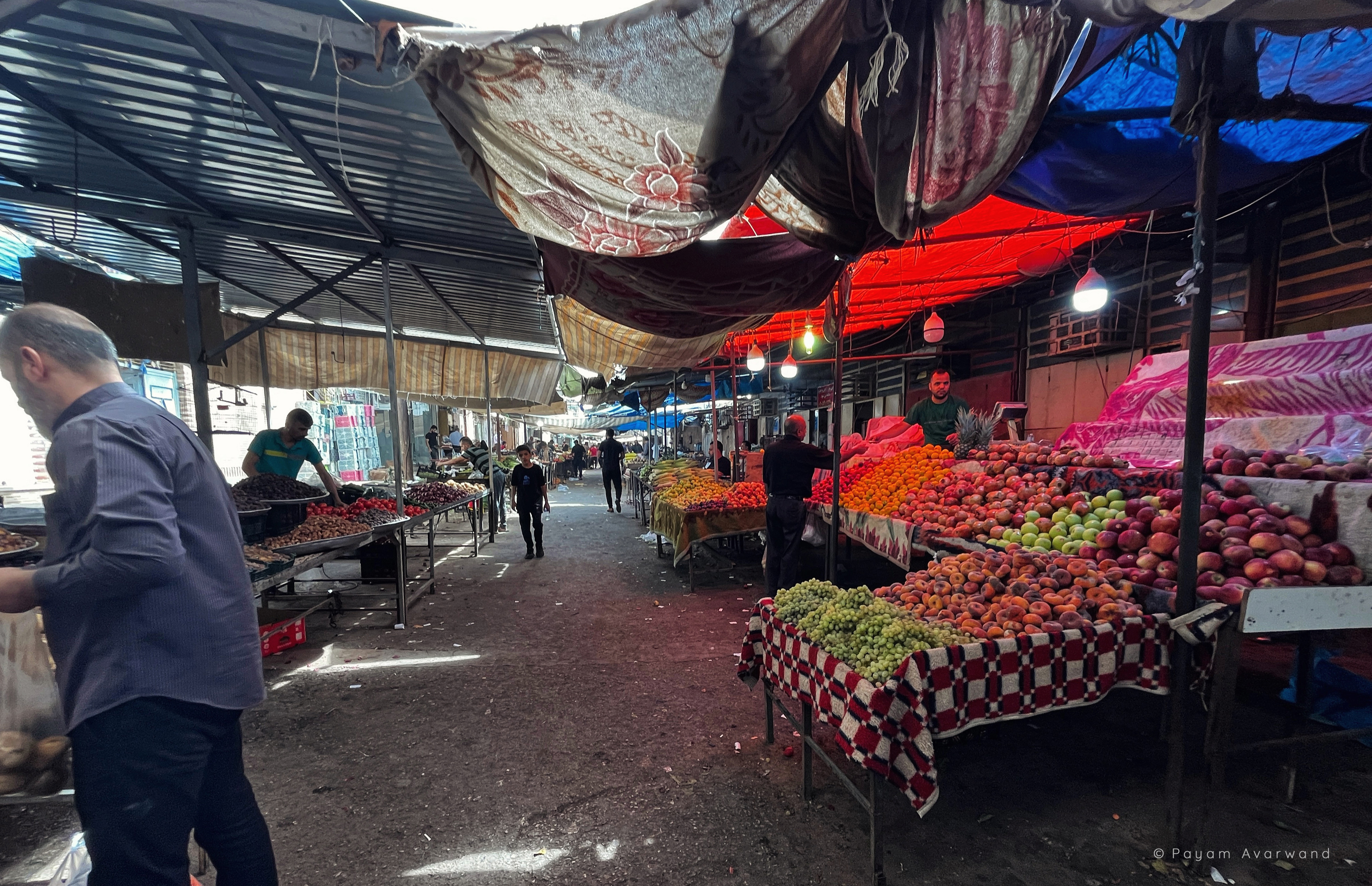
Manba-e Ab Bazaar, 2024

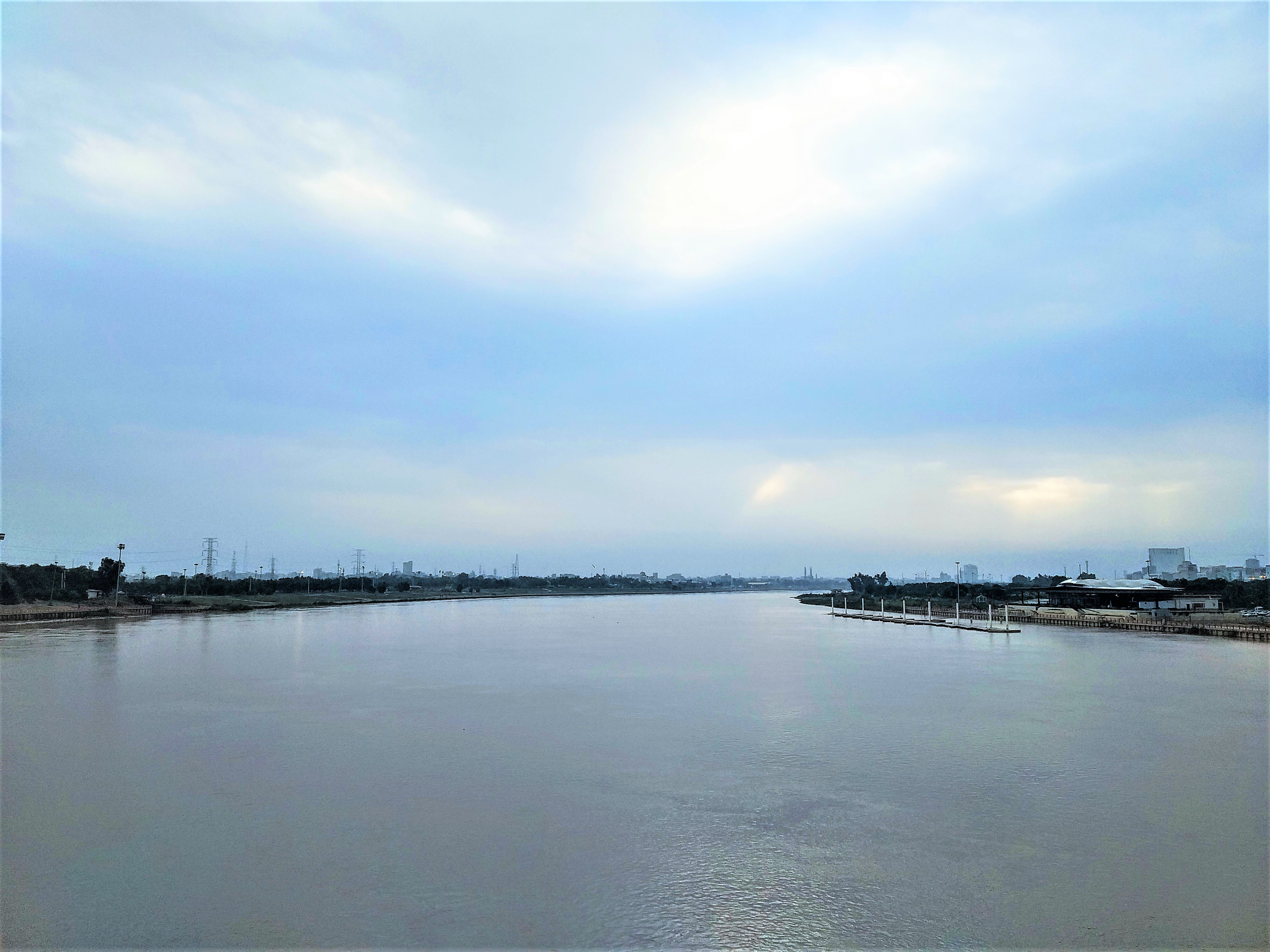
View of the Karun River from Kianpars

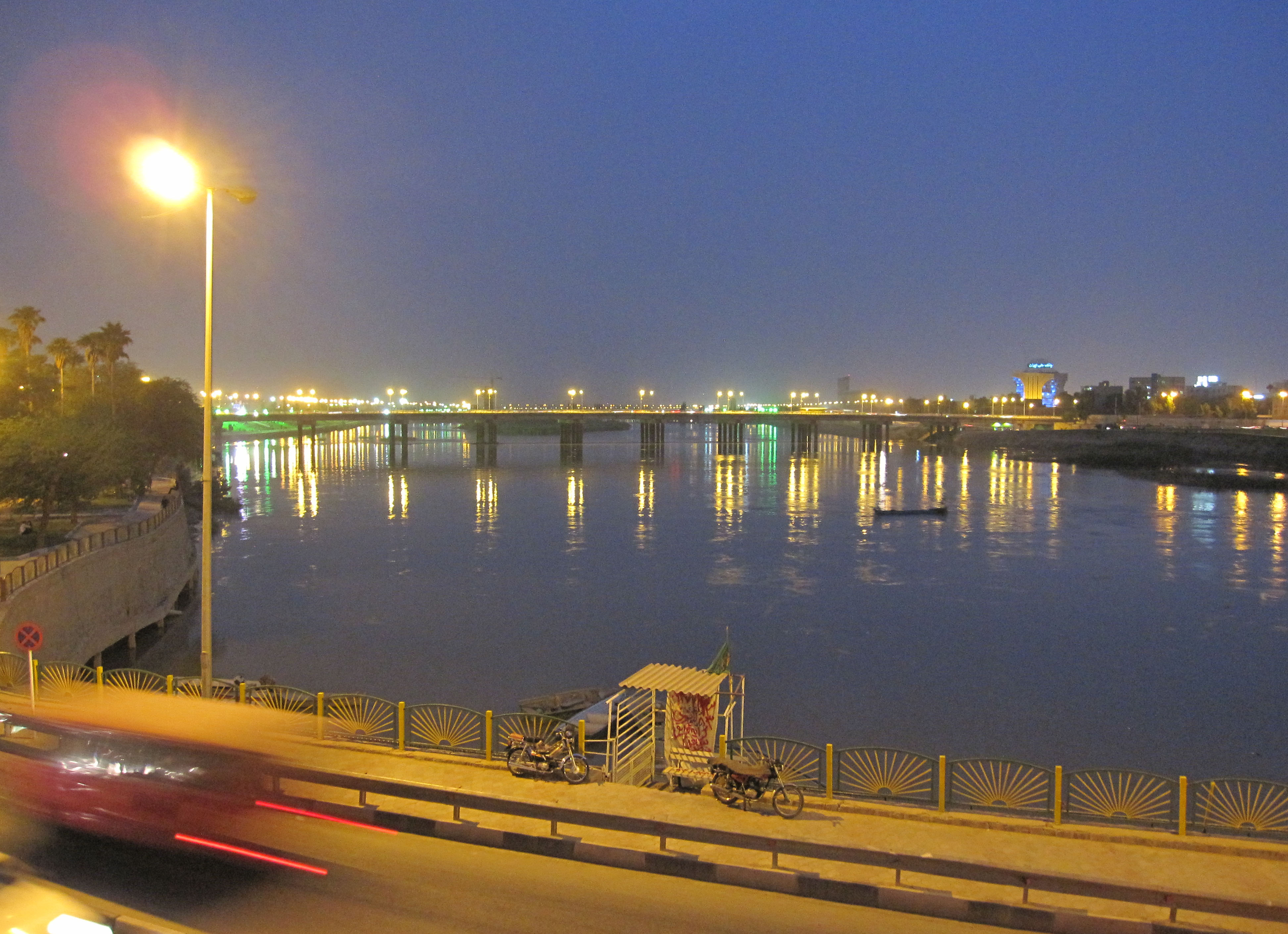
Karun River at night

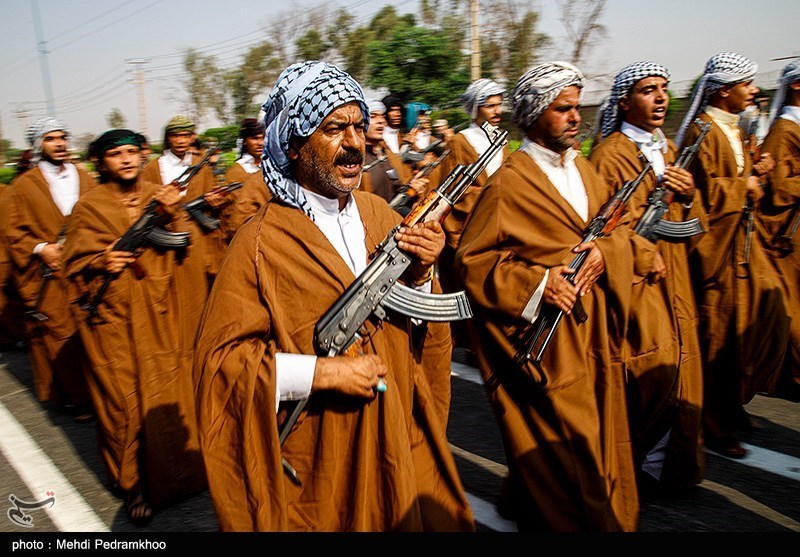
Sacred Defense Week parade, 2022

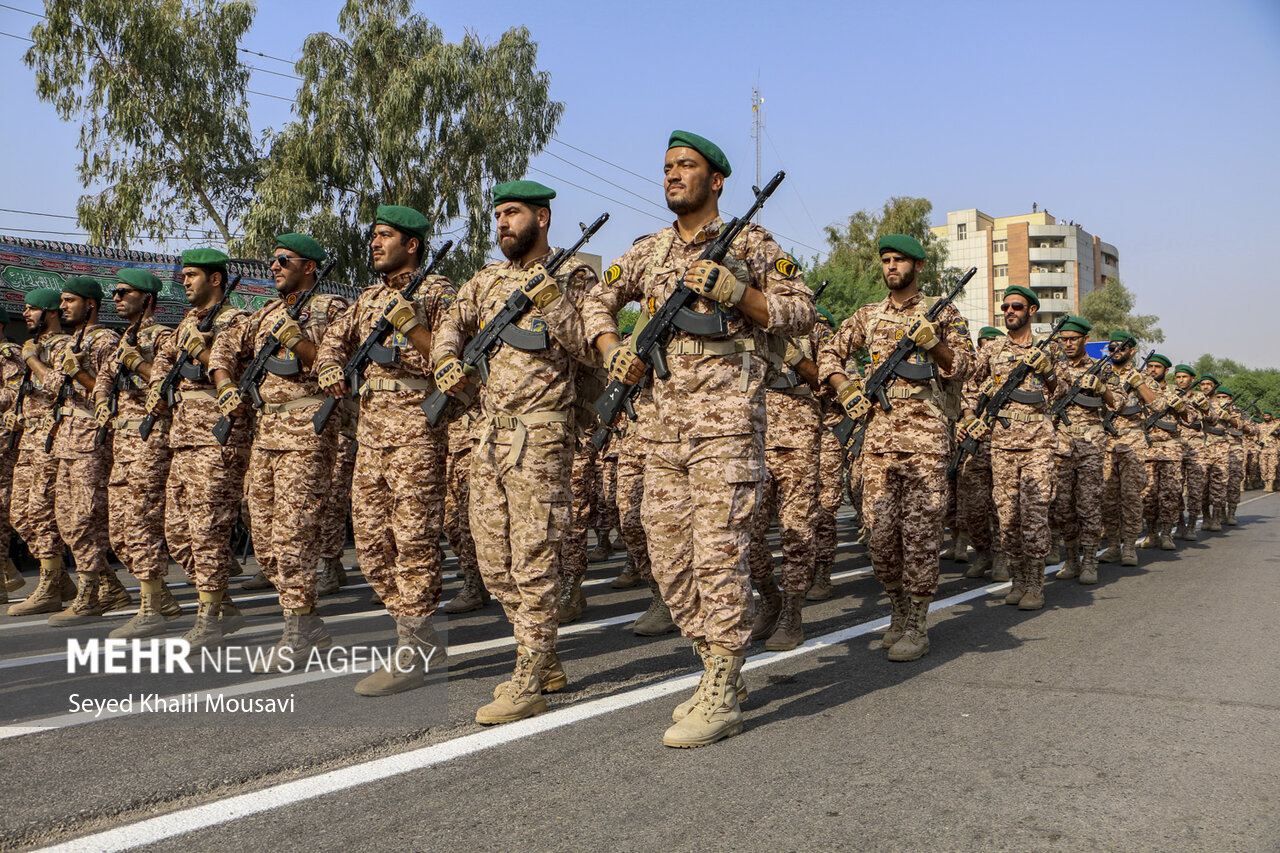
Sacred Defense Week parade, 2022

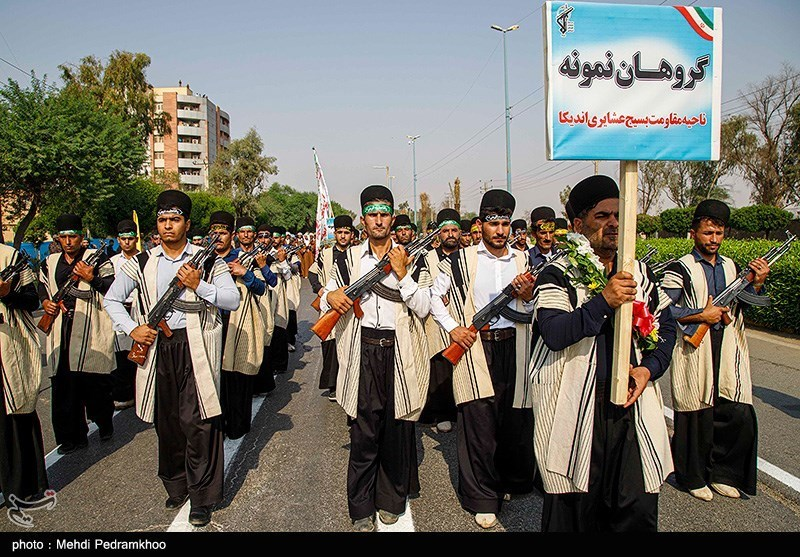
Sacred Defense Week parade, 2022

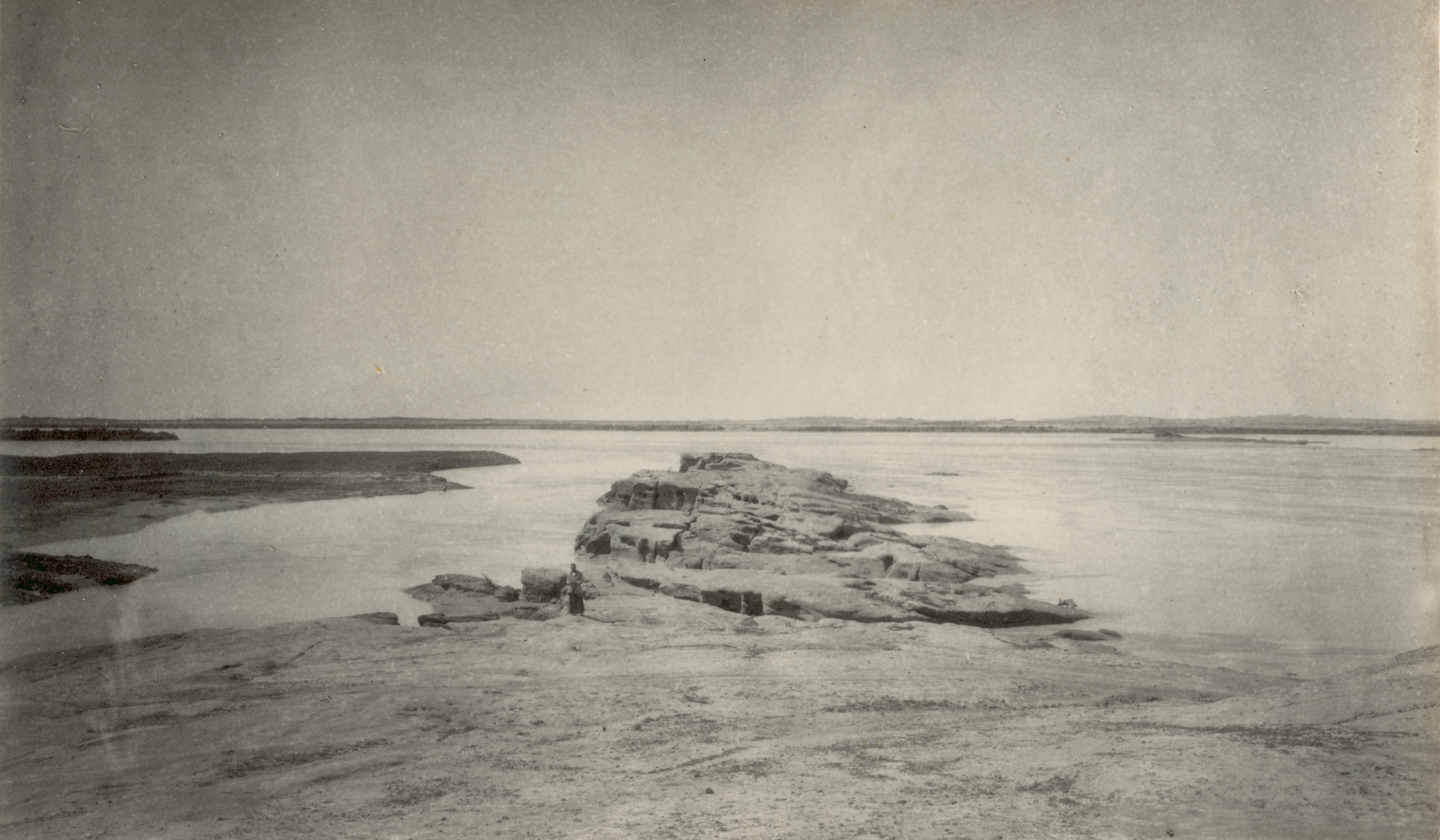
Karun River in Ahvaz, 1891

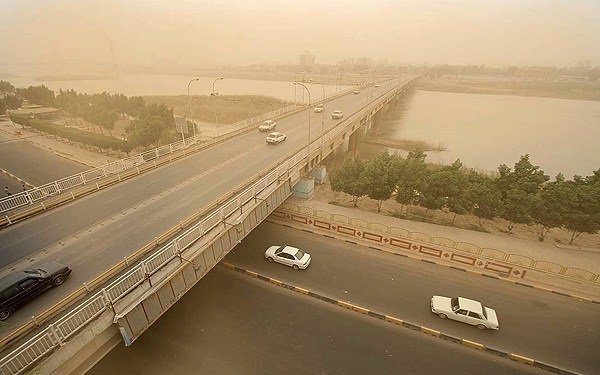
Dust storms in Ahvaz, 2013

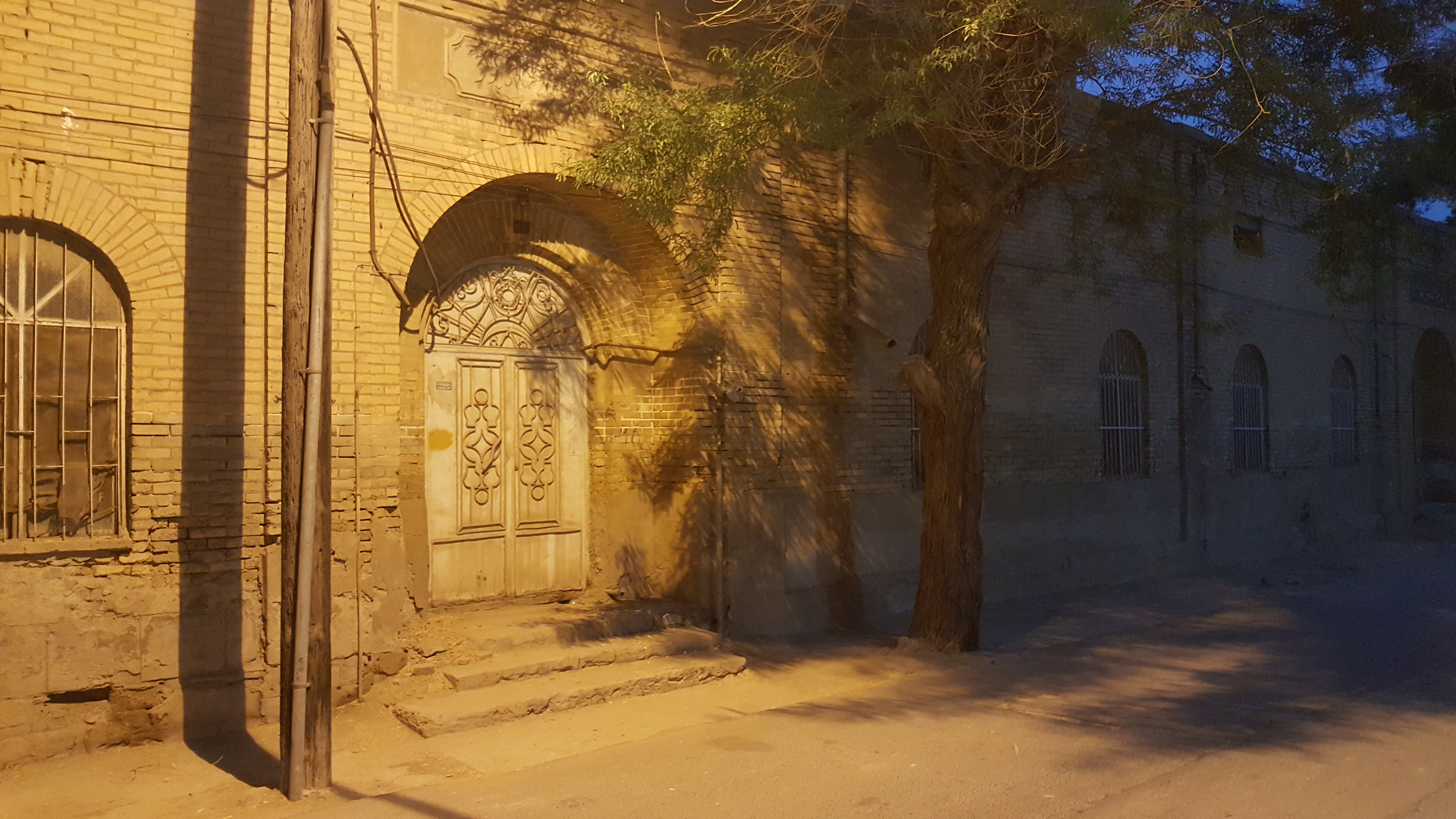
Ahvaz Boys’ Primary Teachers College, 2017

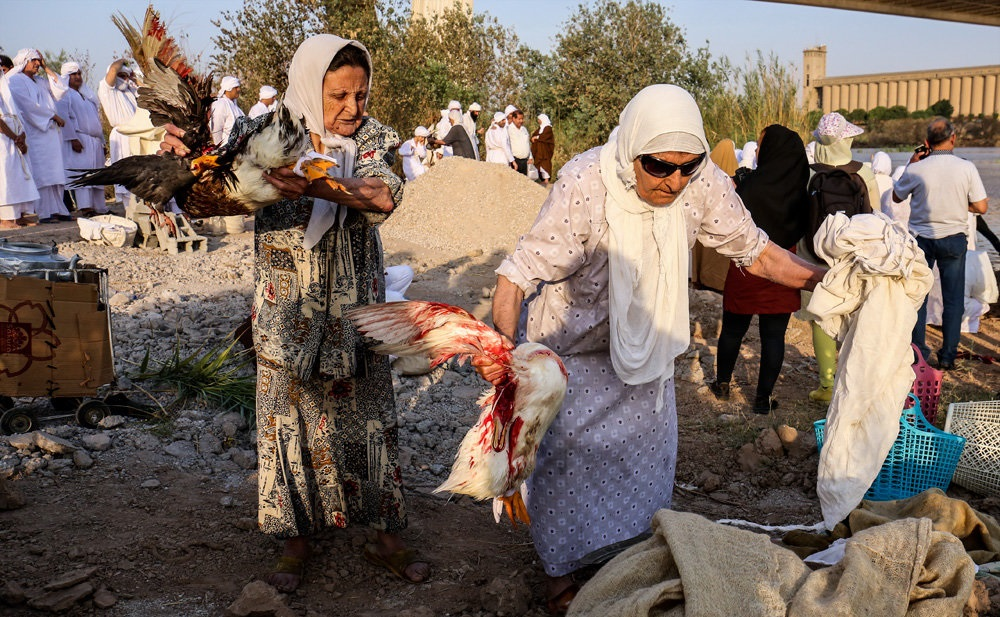
Masbuta (baptism) ceremony of the Mandaeans on the occasion of the Mandaean New Year, 2018

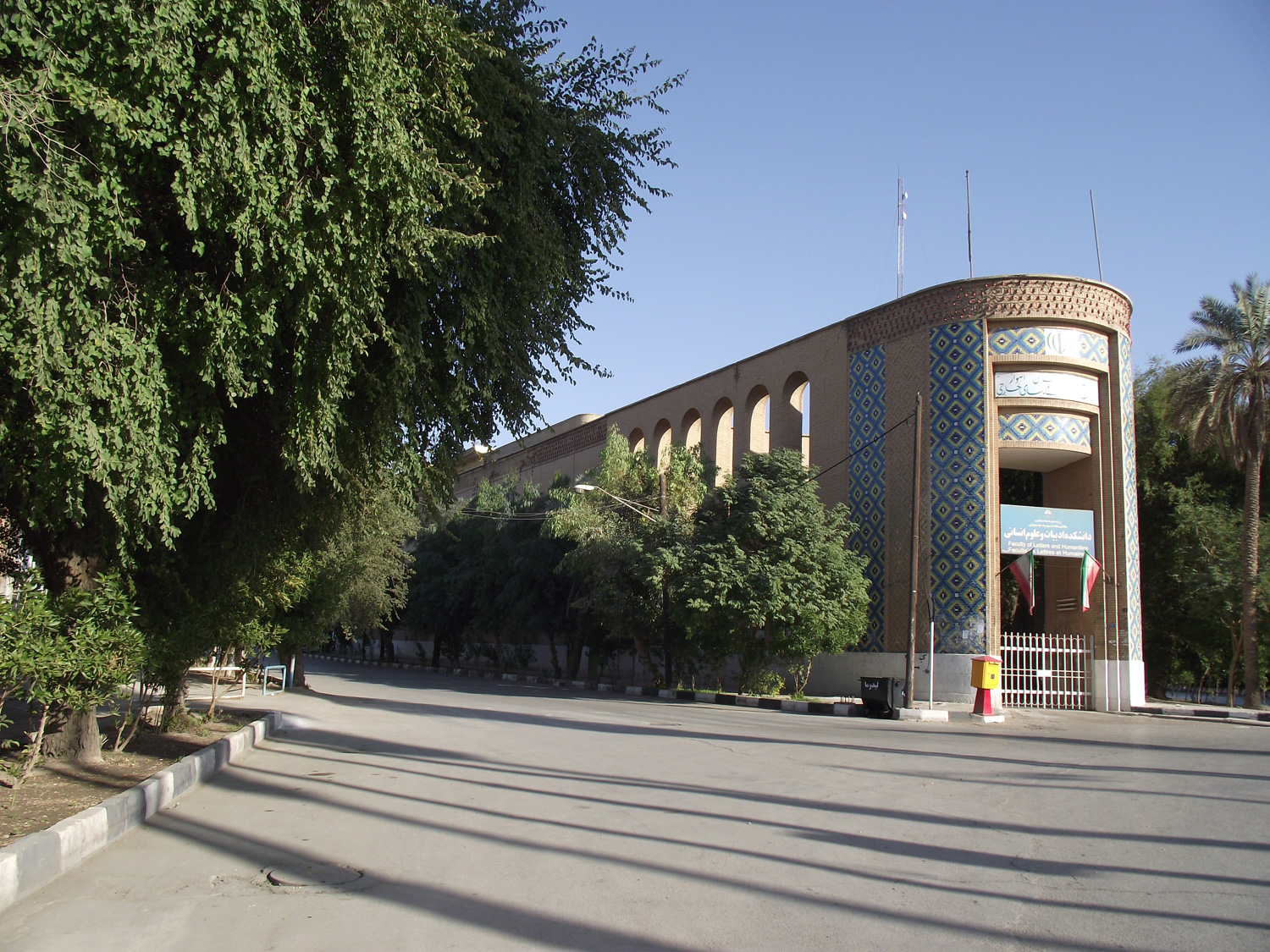
View of the Faculty of Humanities and Literature of Ahvaz (Three-Corner University)

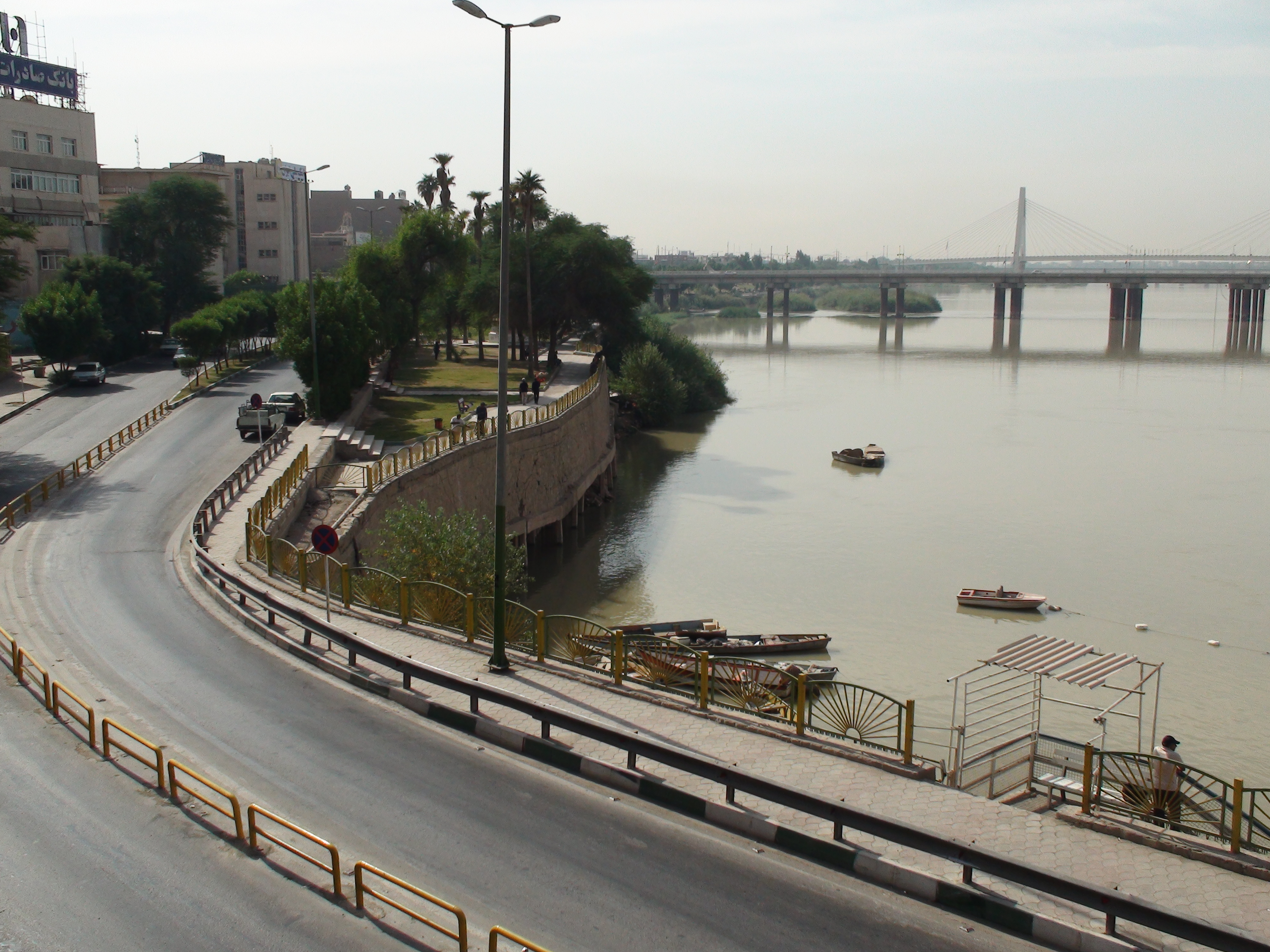
Before the White Bridge – 2009

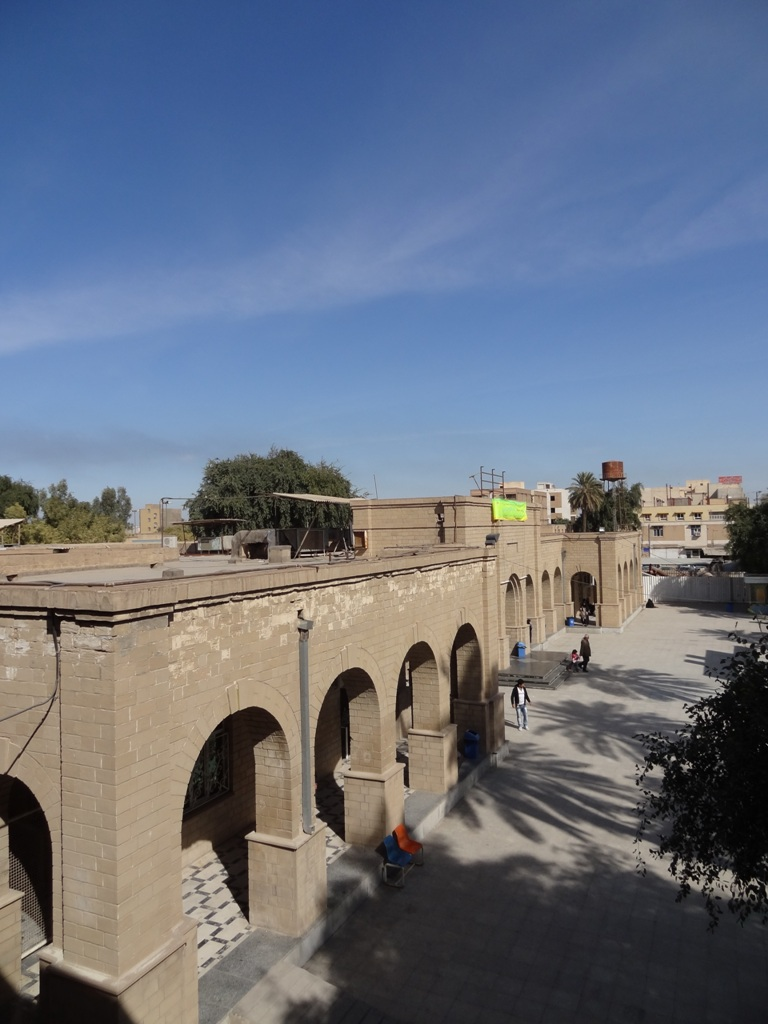
National heritage site: Imam Hospital

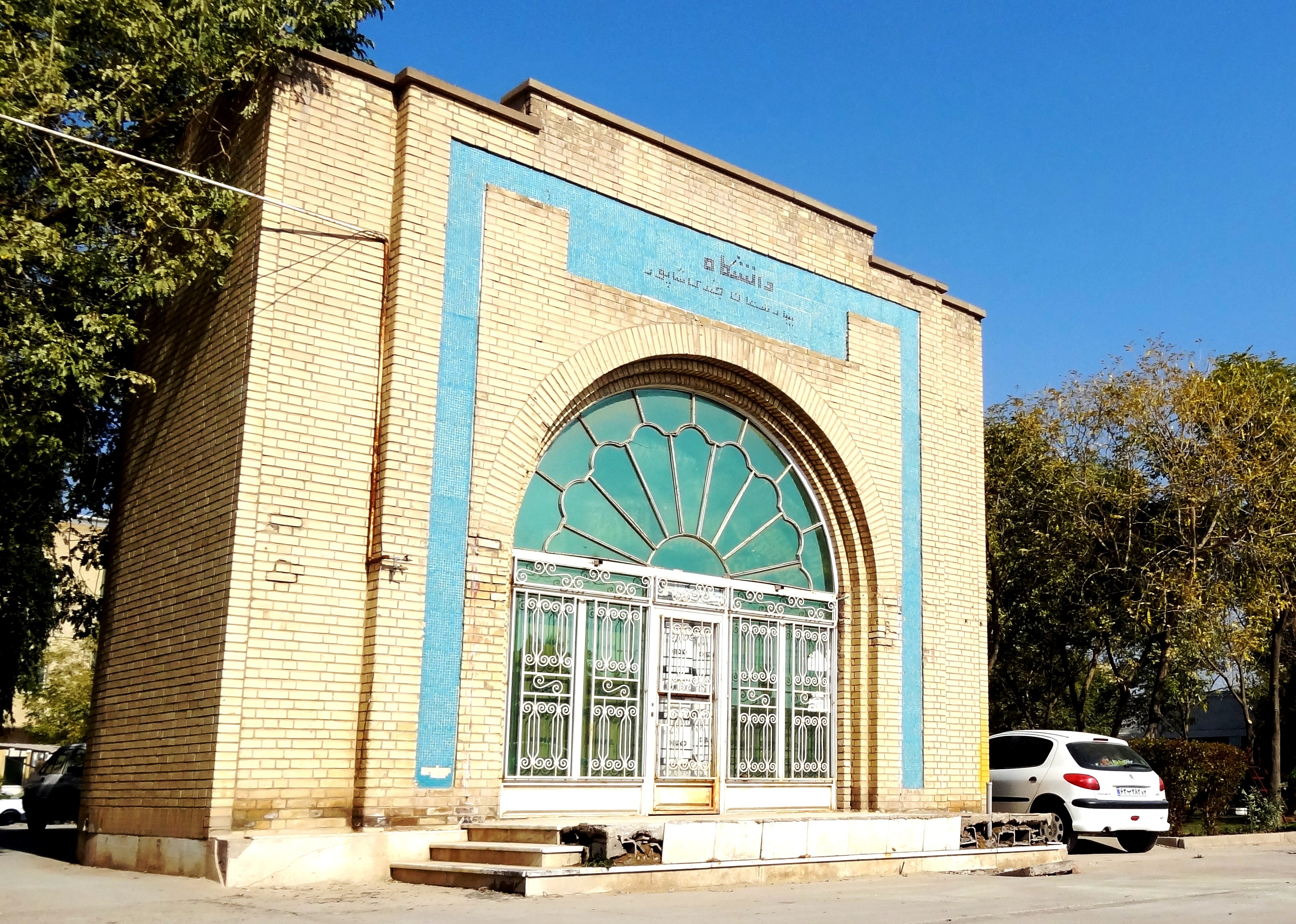
National heritage: Imam Hospital

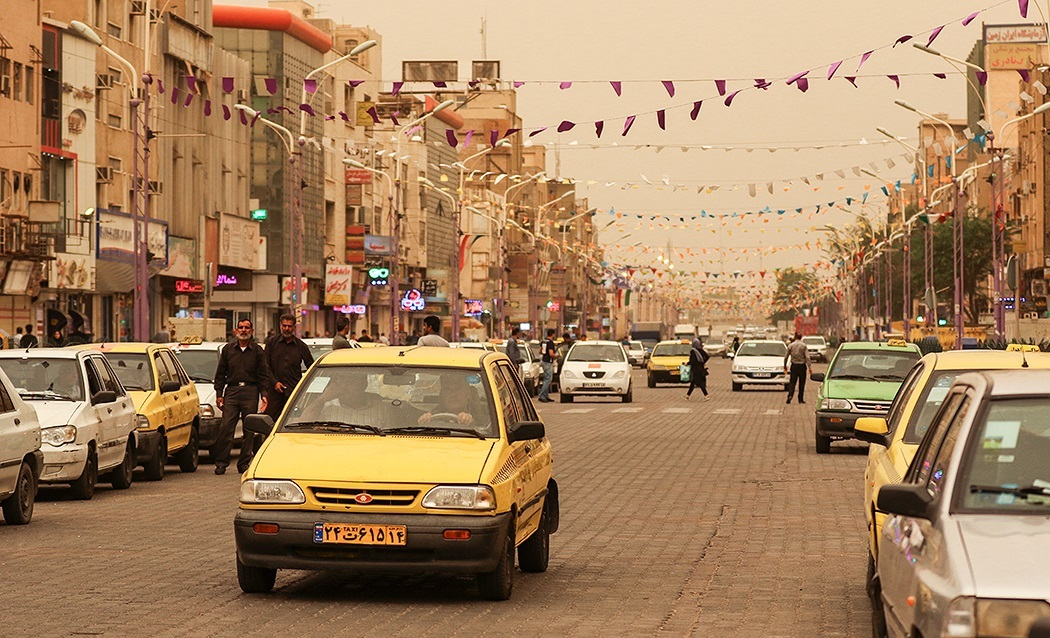
Naderi Street – 2018

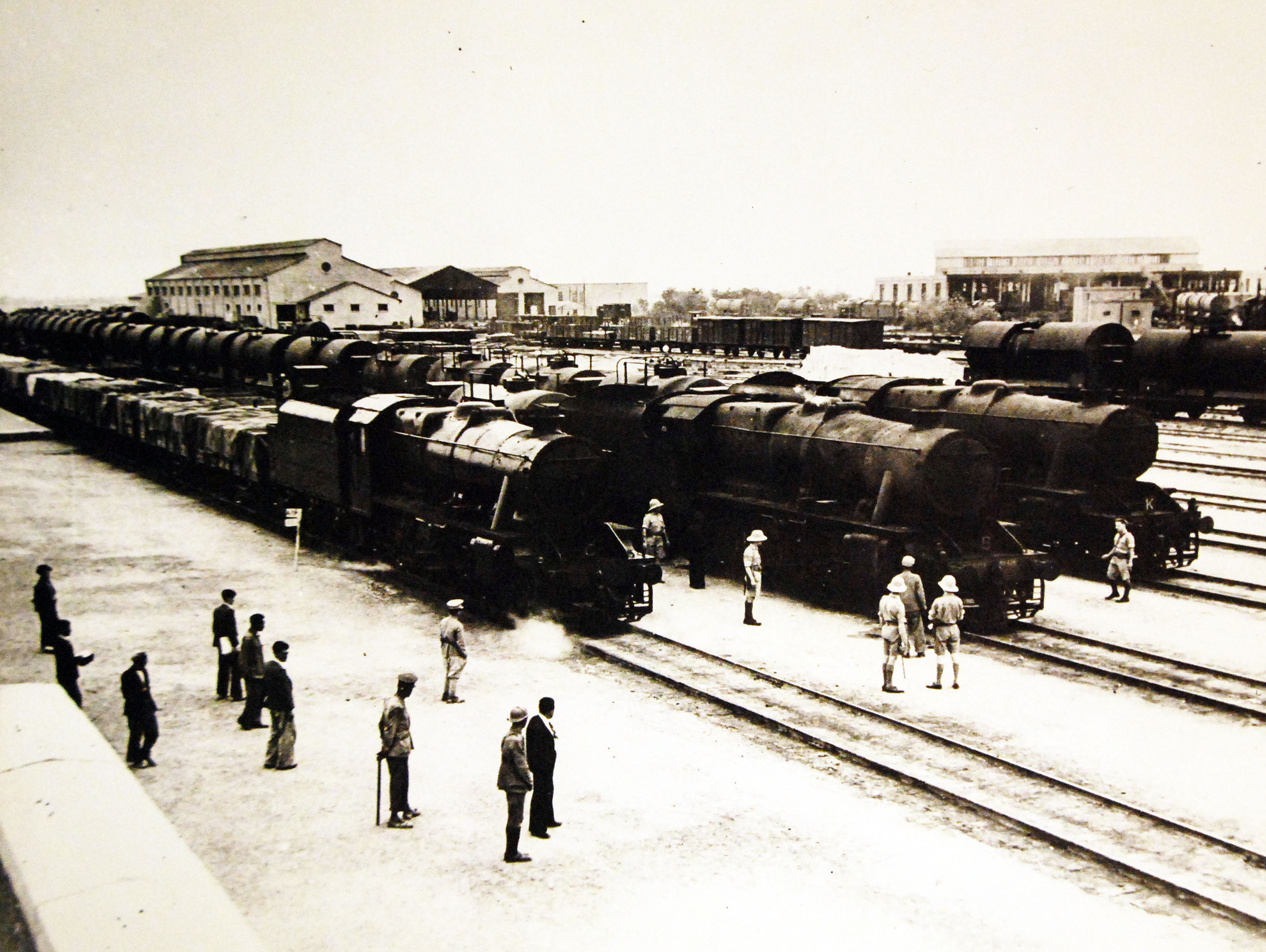
I.M.S. wagons imported from England, named “Churchill’s Reply”, moving from the maneuver grounds in Ahvaz toward the north, carrying supplies for Russia – 1942

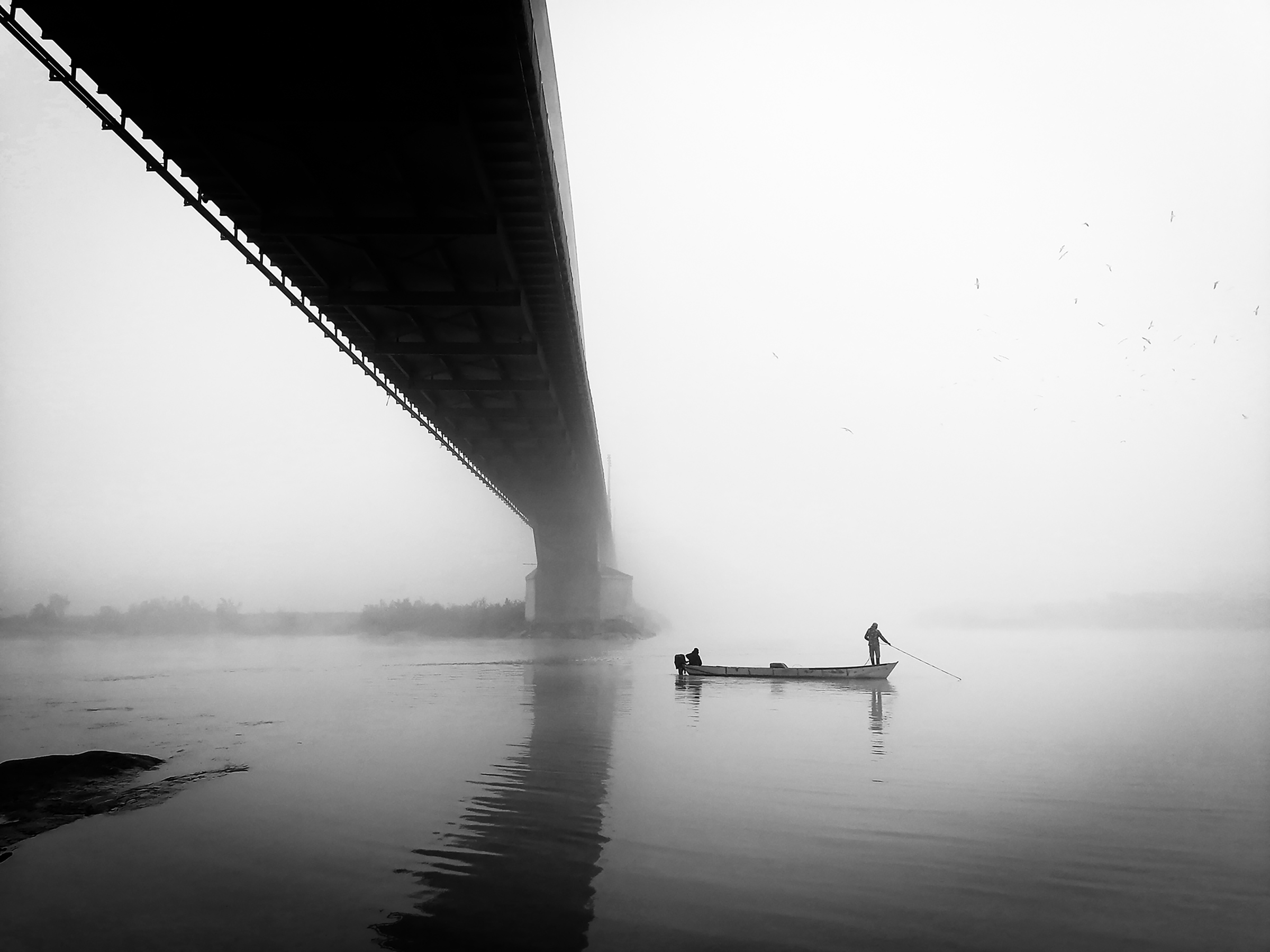
Seventh Bridge on a foggy day

== See also ==
- Ahvaz Field
- Pol Sefid
- Pol Siah
- Takhti Stadium (Ahvaz)

Ahvaz travel guide from Wikivoyage
