= Pol Hashtom =

Bridge in Ahvaz

Coordinates: 31.3141°N 48.6714°E

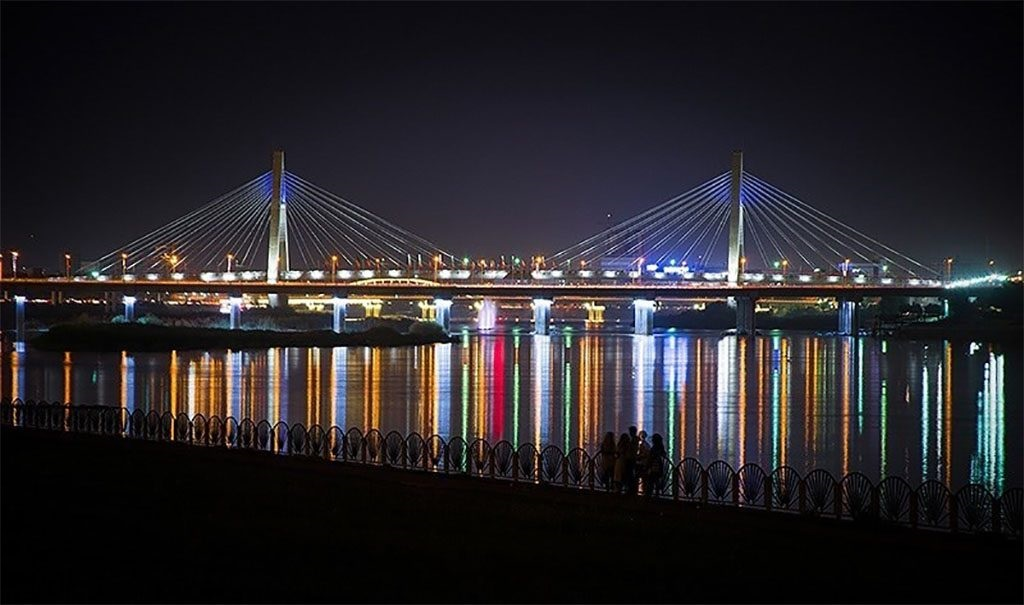
Kabli Bridge in the dusty weather of summer afternoon.

Ahvaz Pol Hashtom or Pol-Kabli (Persian: پل کابلی یا پل هشتم اهواز) known as Qadir Bridge, is the eighth intra-urban bridge in Ahvaz, Khuzestan, Iran. It is the largest intra-urban cable bridge in West Asia.

== History ==
Construction started in February 2006 and ended in March 2012. The bridge connects the Amaniyeh area and Takht-e Soleyman street, which are located west of the Karun river, with Zand street, which is located east of this river.

== Design ==
The structure is of wicker cable type. Its length is 1,314 metres (4,311 ft) and its width is 22 metres (72 ft).
