= Pol Siah =

Bridge in Ahvaz, Iran

Pol-e Siah پل سیاه
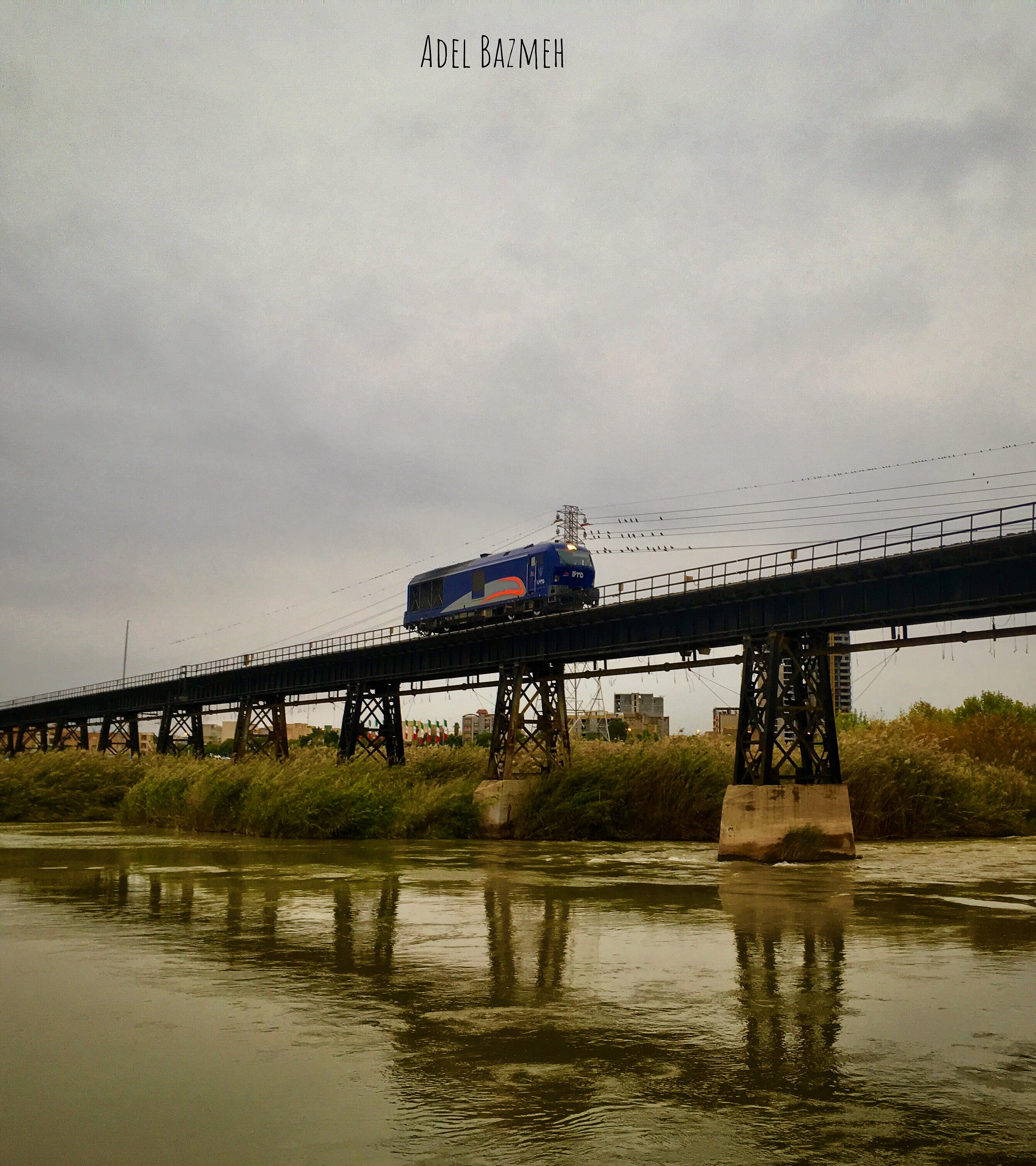
- Pol-e Siah
- Coordinates: 31.3328°N 48.6802°E
- Other name: Victory Bridge

History
- Construction end: 1929

Location
- Interactive map of Pol-e Siah

Pol-e Siah, or the Black Bridge, in Ahvaz, Iran, is a national heritage site. It was constructed in 1929.
