= Mehdi Rabbi =

Iranian writer

Mehdi Rabbi مهدی ربی
- Born: 1980 (age 45–46); Ahvaz
- Occupation: Iranian writer

Mehdi Rabbi (Persian: مهدی ربی) (born in 1980 in Ahvaz) is an Iranian short story writer.

== Biography ==
He did his bachelor's degree in accounting and his master's degree in literature. Since 2014, he has been doing his PhD in the philosophy of art at the Islamic Azad University, Science and Research Branch, Tehran. He also teaches how to write the short story and playwright at the University of Art in Tehran.

== Books ==
- An goosheh denj samte chap, Cheshmeh publishing
- Boro velgardi kon rafigh, Cheshmeh publishing

== Critics on his works ==
The critics of the works of Mehdi Rabbi have been published in the media.

- Alireza Farahani's critic of Mehdi Rabbi's short stories, Kargozaran newspaper, 2008
- Reza Ghanbari's critic on Mehdi Rabbi's short stories, Iran book news agency, 2008

== Awards ==
Mehdi Rabbi has been awarded several literary awards for his books in Iran. Here is the list of some of his awards:

- The Printed Matter Critics Award, 2007
- Isfahan Literary Award, 2007
- Candidate for Golshiri Award, 2007
