= Ali Sajadi Hoseini =

Iranian film director

Ali Sadjadi Hoseini (Persian: علی سجادی حسینی, 1953 in Ahvaz, Iran – 1994 in Tehran) was an Iranian film director.

His 1991 film Old Men's School won the children's jury prize at the 3rd Cairo International Children's Film Festival.

== Selected filmography ==
- The Silence, 1990
- The Old Men's School, 1991
- The Secret of the Red Spring, 1992
- Transit, 1993
- The Line of Fire, 1994
