= Taryana =

Taryana or Tareiana was an ancient city in southwestern Iran (Persia) where present Ahvaz is located, its history dates back to c. 500 BC.

== See also ==
- Khuzestan
- History of Iran
- Ahvaz
