= Lurs =

Iranian people

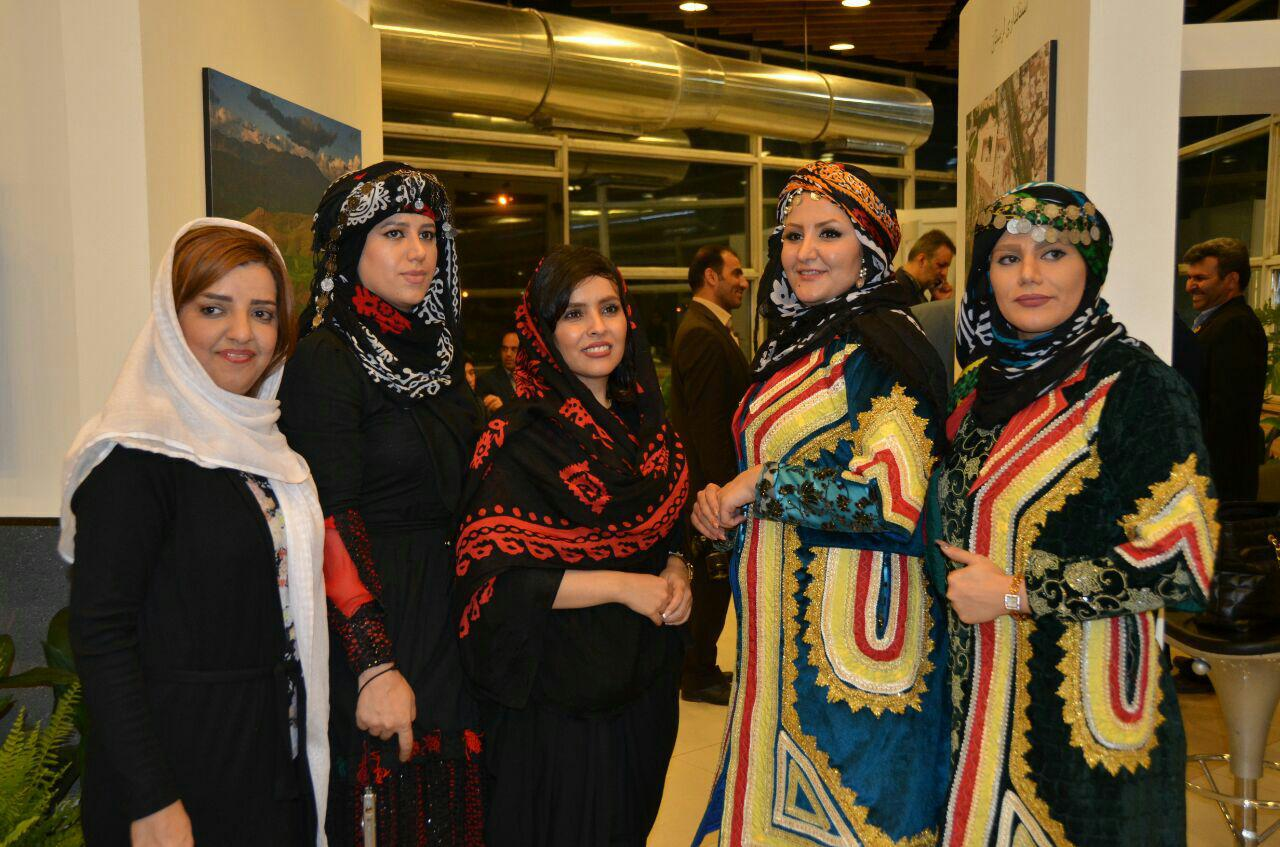
- Lur women at the 2016 Luristan cultural week in Tehran, Iran

Total population
- c. 6,000,000

Regions with significant populations
- Iran: 4–6 million Approximately 6% of Iran's population

Languages
- Luri

Religion
- Predominantly Shia Islam

Related ethnic groups
- Other Southwestern Iranian peoples, especially Dezfulis and Shushtiaris

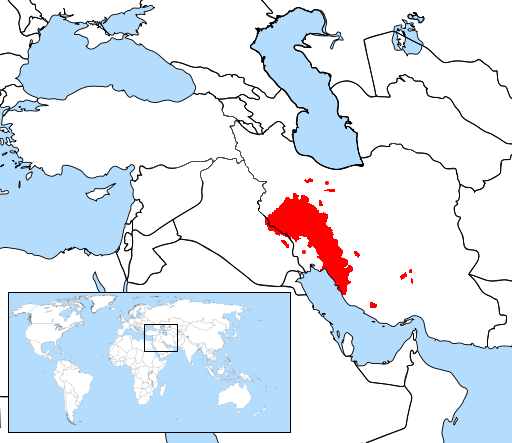
Areas with a Lur majority

The Lurs, Lors or Luris (Persian: لر) are an Iranian people living mainly in western and southern Iran. The main Lur subgroups include the Bakhtiari, Mamasani, Kohgiluyeh, and Lur proper, who are principally linked by the Luri language. There are additionally several smaller Lur subgroups.

Lorestan province is named after the Lurs. However, not all Lurs live in Lorestan, nor are all the inhabitants of Lorestan ethnic Lurs. Many Lurs live in other provinces of Iran including Fars, Chaharmahal and Bakhtiari, Kohgiluyeh and Boyer-Ahmad, Khuzestan, Hamadan, Isfahan, Tehran southern Ilam province, and Genaveh county in Bushehr province.

== Origin ==
=== Ancestry ===
There are several disputes over the origin of the Lurs. However, they are believed to be of Elamite and Kassite origin. Iranist and historian Walther Hinz described the Elamites as possible "Proto-Lurs", while The Cambridge Ancient History suggests that the Lurs may have preserved the ancient name of the Lullubi.

=== Name ===
The term "Lur" was first mentioned after the Islamic conquest of Iran. In early Islamic sources, "Lūr", or "Bilād al-Lūr" (ﺑﻼد اﻟﻠﻮر), was a region between Khuzestan province and Isfahan city. Thus, it was believed that the name Lur originally derived from the name of the region and later came to be the name of the tribes living in the region. While the term Lur was first used in a geographic context in the 4th Islamic century, it was first used in an ethnic context in the 5th century. The first mention of the Luri tribes was in Vis and Rāmin, a famous Persian story, specifically a line stating "the world was saved from thieves and pickpockets, from the Kurds and the Lurs, and from bandits and Ayyārs." It was agreed that the term "Lur" was originally regional and later came to refer to the local tribes, and that "Luri" was a demonym, meaning "attributed to Lur", with Lur being the region from Khuzestan to Isfahan mentioned in early Islamic sources. The term Alvar (الوار) was also used as a plural for Lur, and Alvar was historically applied to both Lurs as an ethnic group and to "pastoral nomads as an occupational entity." The terms Lur and Alvar were also described as tribal designations.

== History ==
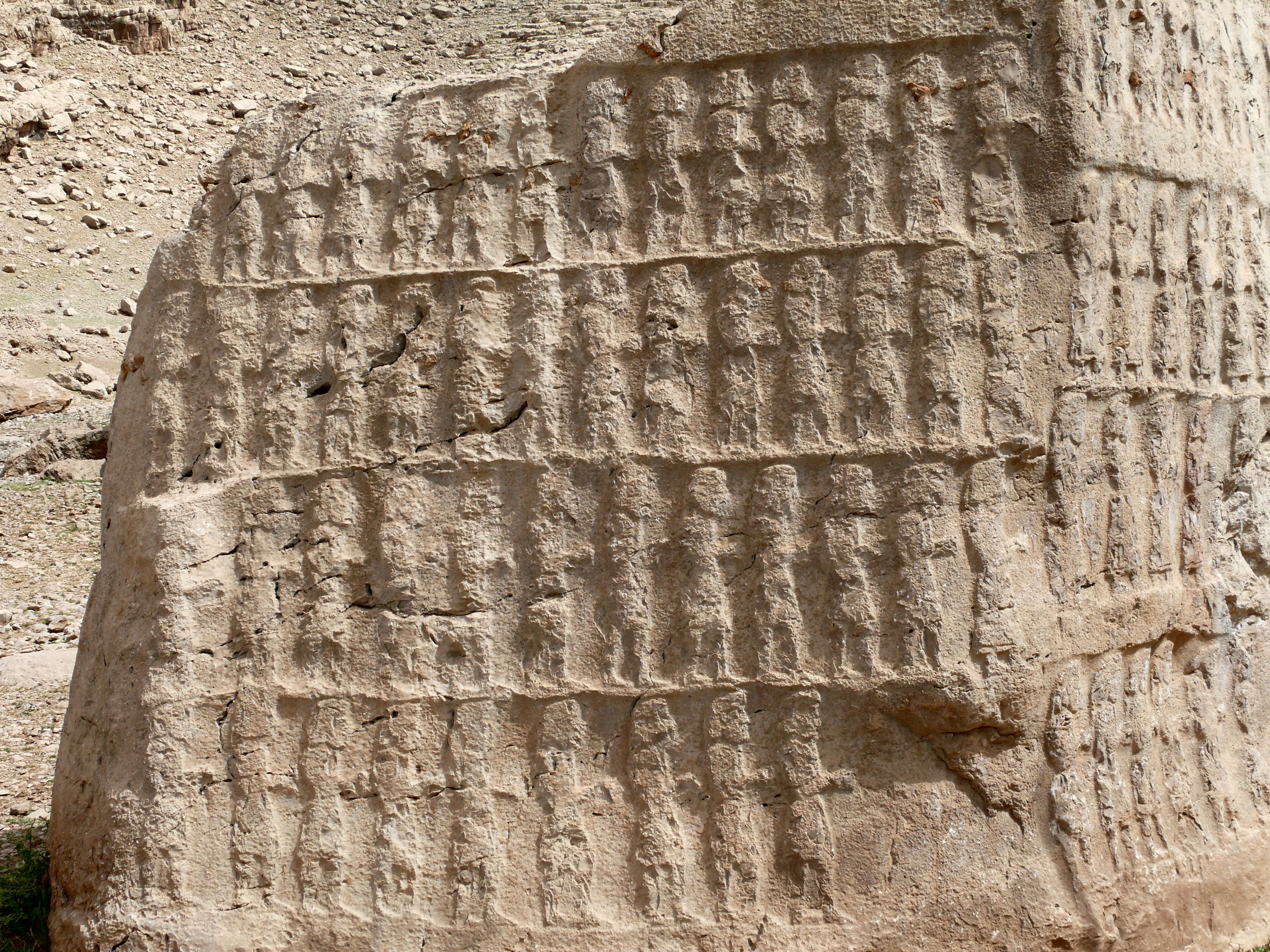
West side of the elamite rock relief said "Kul-e Farah"

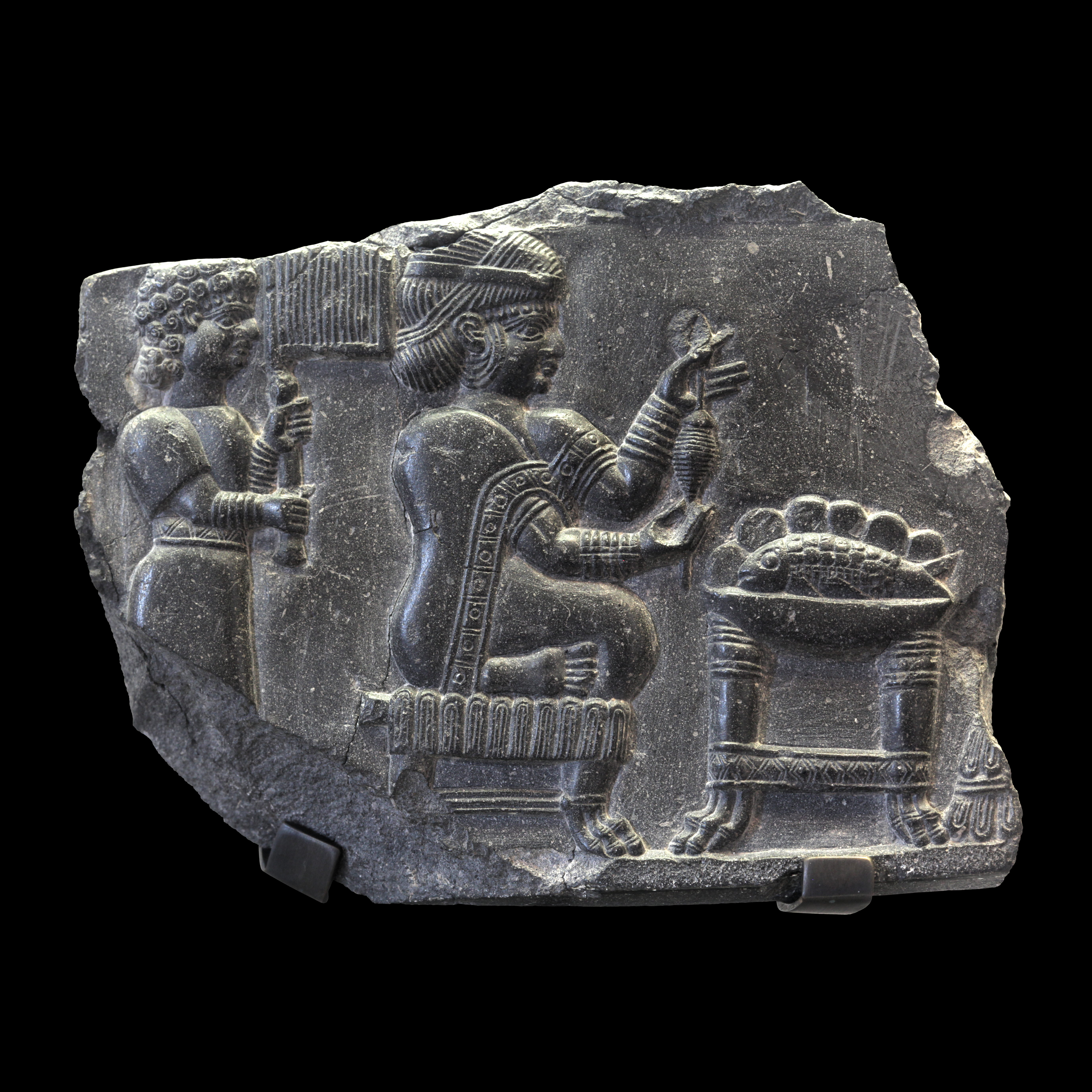
Relief of an Elamite noblewoman

Lurs are a mixture of Iranian tribes, originating from Central Asia and the pre-Iranic tribes of western Iran, such as the Kassites (whose homeland appears to have been in what is now Lorestan) and Gutians. In accordance with geographical and archaeological matching, some historians argue that the Elamites were the Proto-Lurs, whose language became Iranian only in the Middle Ages. The distinctive characteristics of the Lur dialects imply that they were Iranized by Persis rather than Media.

The Luri language was first mentioned in Tarikh-i Guzida, where Hamdullah Mustawfi claimed that ح, خ, ش, ص, ض, ط، ظ, ع, غ, and ق did not exist in the Luri language. The oldest surviving Luri manuscript was 3 pages and dated back to the 11th Islamic century. The Arabic term "الرطانة" (ar-Riṭāna), meaning "speaking in an unintelligible way" or "to speak a non-Arabic language" was used in "Nukhbat al-dahr", an 8th century book, to describe the language of a region named "Lūz" (لوز), a misspelling of "Lur". The author wrote that "the region of Lūz, its people live in a mountain attached to Isfahān mountains with a length of seven days in which tribes of Kurds live … the people of this region have their own language which resembles "riṭāna", although their dominant language is Persian." The Lurs may have been generalized as Kurds at that time due to their perceived "backwardness" or their language being incomprehensible to standard Persian. However, the distinct identity of the Lurs was increasingly noted by historians like Ibn al-Sam'ani, Hamdallah Mustawfi, and Ibn Fadlallah al-Umari.

The history of the Lurs is closely linked with the dynasties that ruled in Khuzestan, Shiraz, Isfahan, Hamadan and in the Zagros Mountains. The Buyid dynasty is known to have produced coins at Izeh. In 935, they marched their forces through Lorestan. The Karkheh River was later controlled by the Hasanwayhid dynasty, who used Sarmadj as their capital. In c. 1009, they conquered Shapur-Khwast (Khorramabad). In 1042, the Seljuk Empire besieged Shapur-Khwast, then ruled by the Kakuyid dynasty. Between 1152 and 1174/75, Lorestan and some of Khuzestan was controlled by a Turkic lord named Husam al-Din Shuhla. The tribal structure of the Lurs, whose development culminated with the arrival of the Atabegs, was unaffected by any outside attempts to conquer Lorestan or seize portions of its land.

After the Luri tribal insurgency in Pahlavi Iran against the newly crowned Reza Shah (r. 1925–1941), the Lur lands were brought into the normal system of Iranian government, which included forcibly making semi-nomadic tribesmen settle. The semi-nomadic way of life that many Bakhtiaris and Lurs were familiar with, however, returned as a result of Reza Shah's toppling in the 1941 Anglo-Soviet invasion of Iran and the period of less effective rule during the early years of Mohammad Reza Pahlavi's reign. In 1986, at the time of the publication of Vladimir Minorsky's entry on the Lurs in the 2nd edition of the Encyclopaedia of Islam, a sizeable portion of the Lurs and Bakhtiaris were still living that way of life.

=== Elam ===
Area of the Elam

The first people who ruled areas of Luristan were the Elamites. The extent of the influence of the Elamites has been to the present Mamassani area. They were indigenous peoples of Iran, but there is no proper knowledge of how communities are formed and the beginning of their history. They were able to establish a state before the arrival of Aryan ethnic groups in parts of western Iran. The Elam government included Khuzestan, modern Luristan, Poshtkuh (Ilam province and some western Iraqi areas), Bakhtiari mountains and Southern Luri settlement. Babylonians called the land of Elamites Elam or Elamto, meaning "the mountain" and perhaps "the land of sunrise". Elamite is generally accepted to be a language isolate and thus unrelated to the much later-arriving Persian and Iranic languages. In relation to geographical and archaeological matching, historians argue that the Elamites to be the Proto-Lurs, whose language became Iranian only in the Middle Ages.

=== Achaemenids to the Sasanians ===
During the Achaemenid era, Luristan was part of the rule of the Kassites and when the Achaemenids moved from Babylon to Ecbatana, they had to cross the Luristan area and pay ransom to the Kassites. Pahle was the name of a vast land in west of Iran which was included many cities and areas in the current Zagros. The province of Pahla was named after the Sasanian era and the word Pahlavi refers to the people, the language, and the alphabet related to this region. At the time of the Achaemenids, the current Luristan, along with Ilam and Khuzestan, were the third state of this great empire. During the Parthian era, this land was one of the Satraps (states) of this dynasty and finally, during the Sasanian era, the area was named "Pahla".

=== Luristan ===
The word Luristan or Lorestan, is attributed to the areas inhabited by the Lurs. The boundaries of Luristan stretch from the eastern Iraqi plains to the west and southwest of Iran. Today, Lorestan is the name of one of the western provinces of Iran.

== Branches ==
The Lur tribes were generally divided into two main branches, Lor-e Kuchek and Lor-e Bozorg.

Vladimir Minorsky listed the Lur divisions as the Bakhtiari (Haft-Lang and Chahar-Lang), the Kuhgilu (Jaki, Bavi, Aghajari), the Mamasani (Rostam, Baksh, Javid, Doshmanziari), and the Lur proper (Bala Gariva, Tarhan, Dilfan, Selseleh). Garnik Asatrian listed them as the Luri, Bakhtiari, Kohgiluyeh, and Mamasani, while Richard Tapper mentioned them as the Feyli, Bakhtiari, Kohgiluyeh, and Mamasani. Mohammad-Ali Emam-Shooshtari mentioned them as the Luristani, Bakhtiari, Kohgiluyeh, and the Lurs of Fars.

Richard N. Frye listed them as the Feyli, the Bakhtiari, the Kohgiluyeh, the Boyer-Ahmadi, and the Mamasani, adding that the first was part of Lor-e Kuchek and the rest Lor-e Bozorg. Garthwaite similarly organized the subgroups, as did Erik Anonby who added several smaller Lur subgroups.

John W. Limbert listed them as the Lur, Bakhtiari, and Boir Ahmadi, while Lois Beck referred to them as the northern, Bakhtiari (central), and southern divisions.

The Lur tribes also included some groups of Kurdish or Turkic origin which assimilated among them.

== Culture ==
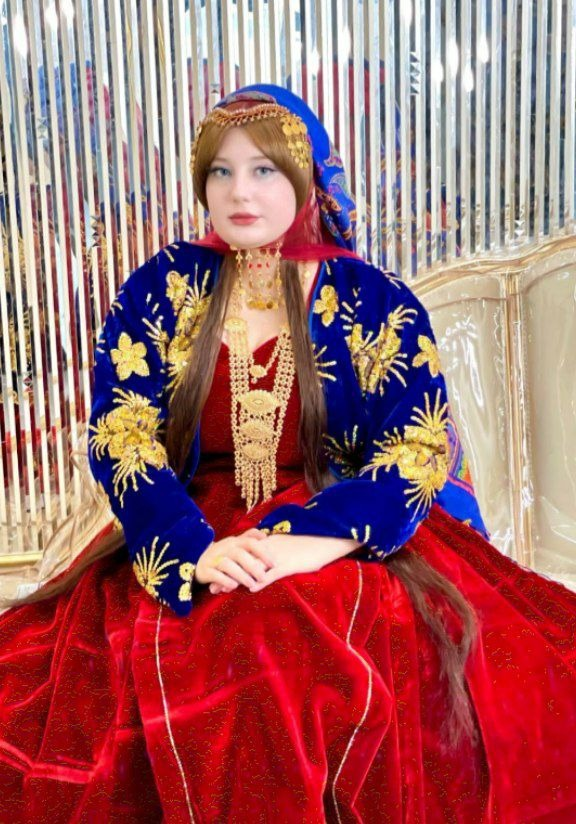
A Lur woman wearing traditional clothing.

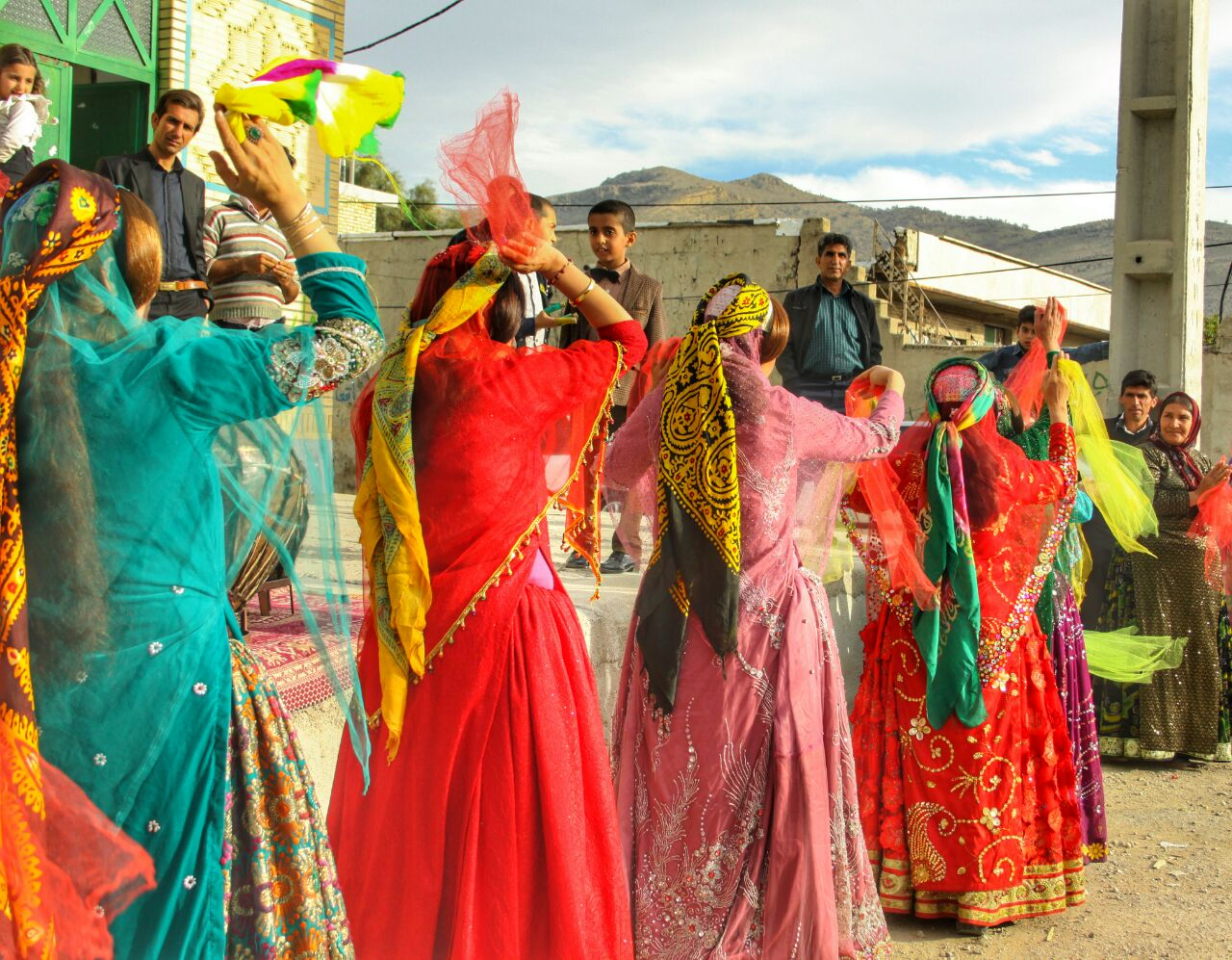
Dasmâl-bâzi dance in Mamasani County, Iran.

The authority of tribal elders remains a strong influence among the nomadic population. It is not as dominant among the settled urban population. As among Kurds, Lur women have much greater freedom than women in other groups within the region. The women have more freedom to participate in different social activities, to wear diverse types of female clothing and to sing and dance in different ceremonies. Bibi Maryam Bakhtiari is a notable Luri woman. Luri music, Luri clothing and Luri folk dances are some of the most distinctive ethno-cultural characteristics of this ethnic group.

Many Lurs are small-scale agriculturists and shepherds. A few Lurs are also traveling musicians. Luri textiles and weaving skills are highly esteemed for their workmanship and beauty.

== Religion and language ==
=== Religion ===
Most of the Lurs are Shia Muslims. The Lurs converted to Islam after the Muslim conquest of Persia, and adopted the Shia sect during the Safavid conversion of Iran to Shia Islam. However, in the context of Lur society, they historically lived within the framework of Islam, although under conditions and circumstances which encouraged a rather free display of popular traditions, and their religion was bound to take on a more ritualistic value. To avoid that, they needed oral interpretation to understand the orthodox faith. Thus, at the beginning of the 19th century, under Mohammad-Ali Mirza Dowlatshah, the Lurs had strayed so far from Islamic orthodoxy that a mojtahed from Karbala was brought in order to "convert" the tribes back to Islam. A small Sunni Muslim community of Lurs also exists. However, pre-Islamic beliefs continued to thrive among Lurs, and they were not fully Islamized until after the 1979 Islamic revolution.

Historically, a significant part of the Lurs followed Yarsanism, especially those with Kurdish heritage. However, the vast majority of them converted to Shia Islam by the 20th century. There is also a small minority of Christian Lurs. Christianity was first introduced to Lurs during the reign of Constantine the Great, developing a unique Christian Lur tradition. According to the Encyclopaedia of Islam, the Lurs revere bread and fire like the Zoroastrians. In Iran, a common stereotype about Lurs was irreligiousness. The topic of many famous Iranian jokes was that Lurs not only failed to adhere to Islam and practice it, but also had no understanding of even the most basic Islamic tenets.

=== Language ===
Luri is a Western Iranian language continuum spoken by about four million people. The continuum constitutes the three dialects of Bakhtiari, Luristani and Southern Luri which linguist Anonby situates between Kurdish and Persian. The Luri language was historically the principal link between the Lur branches and helped consolidate Lur ethnic identity.

== Genetics ==
Considering their NRY variation, the Lurs are distinguished from other Iranian groups by their relatively elevated frequency of Y-DNA Haplogroup R1b (specifically, of subclade R1b1a2a-L23). Together with its other clades, the R1 group comprises the single most common haplogroup among the Lurs. Haplogroup J2a (subclades J2a3a-M47, J2a3b-M67, J2a3h-M530, more specifically) is the second most commonly occurring patrilineage in the Lurs and is associated with the diffusion of agriculturalists from the Neolithic Near East c. 8000-4000 BCE. Another haplogroup reaching a frequency above 10% is that of G2a, with subclade G2a3b accounting for most of this. Also significant is haplogroup E1b1b1a1b, for which the Lurs display the highest frequency in Iran. Lineages Q1b1 and Q1a3 present at 6%, and T at 4%.

It is believed that around 1,000 years ago, inhabitants of the Zagros Mountains gradually differentiated into linguistically distinct Lur and Kurdish groups. Despite this divergence, linguistic, and strong cultural and societal links persist, along with shared origin myths, so that Lurs and Kurds are frequently described as closely related ancient peoples of the Zagros Mountains with a common Indo-Iranian ancestry.

== Diaspora ==
The Luri diaspora is widespread from western Iran and Iraq to Kuwait and Bahrain. According to Ibn Fadlallah al-Umari, many Lurs migrated from Luristan to the Levant and Egypt and established a significant presence, although Salahuddin Ayyubi, who was always wary of Lurs, ordered the massacre of all Lurs in those regions, after which the Luri population in the Levant and Egypt had entirely disappeared. Luri presence in the Levant was also noted by Hamdallah Mustawfi. There were around 80,000 Lurs in Iraq, mostly in the south, east, and central parts, although they were sent to Iran by the government of Saddam Hussein as part of their deportations of Iraqis of Iranian background, and did not return to Iraq like the Feyli Kurds did. It was never verified on the field whether the reported Luri-speakers in eastern Iraq actually spoke Luri or Southern Kurdish. They also have a notable Lur population in Bahrain, and Kuwait, carrying the "Bushehri" surname, among others, such as the "Safar" family, who are claimed to be Bakhtiari Lurs.

== Notable Lurs ==
- Qasem Soleimani, was an Iranian military officer who served in the Islamic Revolutionary Guard Corps (IRGC).
- Ahmed Lur, He was one of the disciples of Fazlallah Na'imi, the founder of the Hurufism sect.
- Baba Lura, a Yarsani poet, saint, reincarnation of Pir Benyamin, and close disciple of Bahlul Mahi.
- Qadam Kheyr, was a notable Luri woman of the late Qajar period.
- Shahmirza Moradi, was an Iranian Lur especially versed in playing sorna.
- Bibi Maryam Bakhtiari, was a revolutionary and activist of the Iranian Constitutional Revolution.
- Rais-Ali Delvary was an Iranian Lur military leader.

== See also ==
- Southern Lurs
- Luri clothing
- Luri dances
- Luri music
- Layli (Luri doll)
