= Luri dances =

Iranian folk dances of Lur people

Luri dances include a range of folk dances popular among different groups of Iran's Lurs. They usually include common Iranian dances; Collective dances and quadrille, the circular arrangement (circle dance), and the colorful clothing.

== History ==
Due to discovered objects and archeological excavations from Luri-inhabited areas like Kozagaran, Tepe Giyan, Tepe Musiyan, CheghaMish and Kul-e Farah, it is evident that dance history predates the Aryan migrations inward the Iranian plateau. Motifs depicting three dancing persons on the pottery discovered and dance portrays on the bronze flags of Luristan of the first millennium BC, musicians and musical instruments depicted on the petroglyphs in Kul-e Farah of Izeh and Cheghamish are the most prominent archaeological evidences showing the value and history of dance in these areas.

== Styles ==
There are many dance styles common in Luri-inhabited areas. The most prevalent Luri dance styles are handkerchief dance, Chupi dances (SanguinSama; slow rhythm along with strike and fiddle, Se-Pa (three steps) dance that is performed faster than SanguinSama, and Du-Pa (Two steps) dance that is the fastest and the most exciting performance), and the stick dance (Çubâzi or Tarka-bâzi)(like Jitterbug wood) which is a martial show. Harvesting ceremony dances, PaPoshtePa dances, Suwaruna and the mourning dances are of less popular dances. Mourning dances are performed while loved persons are died as Chamariuna among Feylis and also among Great Lur tribes (Bakhtiries and the Southern Lurs).

=== Dasmâl-bâzi (Handkerchief dance) ===
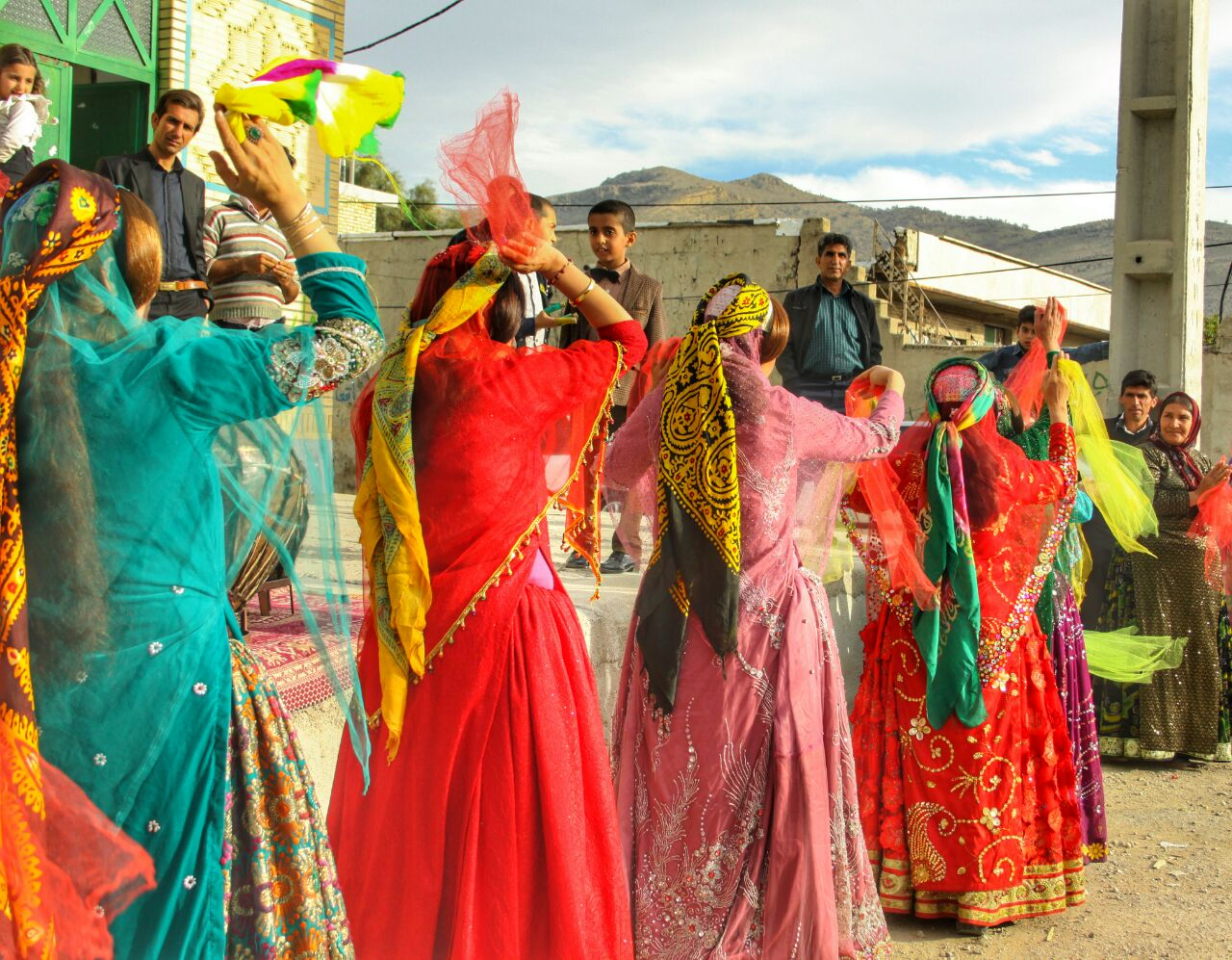
Handkerchief dancers in a wedding ceremony, Mamasani, Iran

Handkerchief dance also known as scarf dance (Luri:Dasmâl-bâzi) is a vibrant circle dance style. This dance style is more common among Southern Lurs and Bakhtiari people. This style is usually performed by both male and female persons and includes different performing styles like Ashtafi-manganâ. Men or women may dance and wave colorful scarves, called dastmâl. A dasmâl is held in each hand. In case of the philosophy, it is believed that these dances have originated in the actions the women do in their daily livelihood. As the dance rhythm increases slowly, each person may chooses patterns to perform.

=== Ču-bâzi (Twig dance) ===
Ču-bâzi or Chubazi (twig dance) is a special dance double that is performed in the celebrations and joys by Bakhtiari and the southern Lurs and is inspired by the heroic battles. It is usually dance by two men, although sometimes is performed by the women too. One dancer (the defender) is equipped with a long heavy stick up to four or five feet long. The other (the attacker) whom holds a shorter flexible stick (tarka), has to attack the opponent only below the level of the knee. While the dance is accompanied by drum and karnâ (a horn music instrument), the defender is only allowed to escape the strike by leaping up in the air. The contributors change in turn till the protagonists are specified. The dancers are surrounded by female and male enthusiastic audiences whom cheer the winners by screams and whistles.

=== Čupi (Choupi) ===
In Luri dialects, mass dance styles that are mainly based on leg movements are said Čupi (چووپی, Choupi). Mixed male and female dancers hold hands to form rings, hearing the vibrant musics by musicians, they perform different styles of čupi. The leader performer (Sarčupi or Čupikeš) is a skillful dancer whose duty is to lead others and warm up them in accordance with dance music rhythms. Other performers should coordinate the movements and body rhythms with the leader. The dance usually starts with Sangin-Samâ rhythm which is performed slowly, following Sepâ (Three steps) the next rhythm with faster performing and soars when vibrant Dopâ (two steps) is performing. After a while, the dance concludes to Sangin-Samâ movements in a reversed trend.

==== Sangin-Samâ ====
Sangin-samâ (also Sangin-sepâ or Samâ) is usually the first phase of Čupi mass dance style and includes gentle and slow movements. Performers, initially put their right foot in the form of a cross with left foot, then take it and take two steps forward. Then they put the left foot with the tip of the toe and finally put it aside right foot. The hands bend from elbow and small fingers of dancers, in line with the shoulders, are tied among each other. It seems that each of the gestures and dance components of Sama, has a philosophy retrieved from thousands years of coexistence with humane and natural elements behind it.

==== Sepâ ====
In Čupi dance continuum, the second phase is Sepâ (three steps) which is performed faster and more dynamic than Sangin-Samâ in accordance with speeding up the music rhythm. Dancers start the dance with the right foot and take three steps forward. In Luri dances, like most Iranian group dances, the start of the move is with the right foot. After removing the three steps, the dancers first bend the right leg and then the left foot. The dancers' hands in this dance are tied to each other and their shoulders rely on each other. The literal meaning of dance in Luri (Dasgerta), is the bond between hands when dancing.
