= Southern Lurs =

Ethnic Lurs who speak the Southern Luri dialect

Southern Lurs (Southern Luri: لݸرَلِ جنۈبی) are a major subgroup of Lurs who natively speak the Southern Luri language a branch of Western Iranian languages, and are an Iranian people. They occupy some regions in Southwest of Iran including Kohgiluyeh and Boyer-Ahmad (fully), Southeastern parts of Khuzestan (Behbahan, Omidiye, Hendijan, Ramhormoz and Bagh-e Malek counties) Northwestern parts of Fars (Mamasani, Rostam, Lamerd, Kazerun, Sepidan and Eqlid counties), and Western parts of Bushehr province (Deylam, Ganaveh and some parts of Dashtestan county).

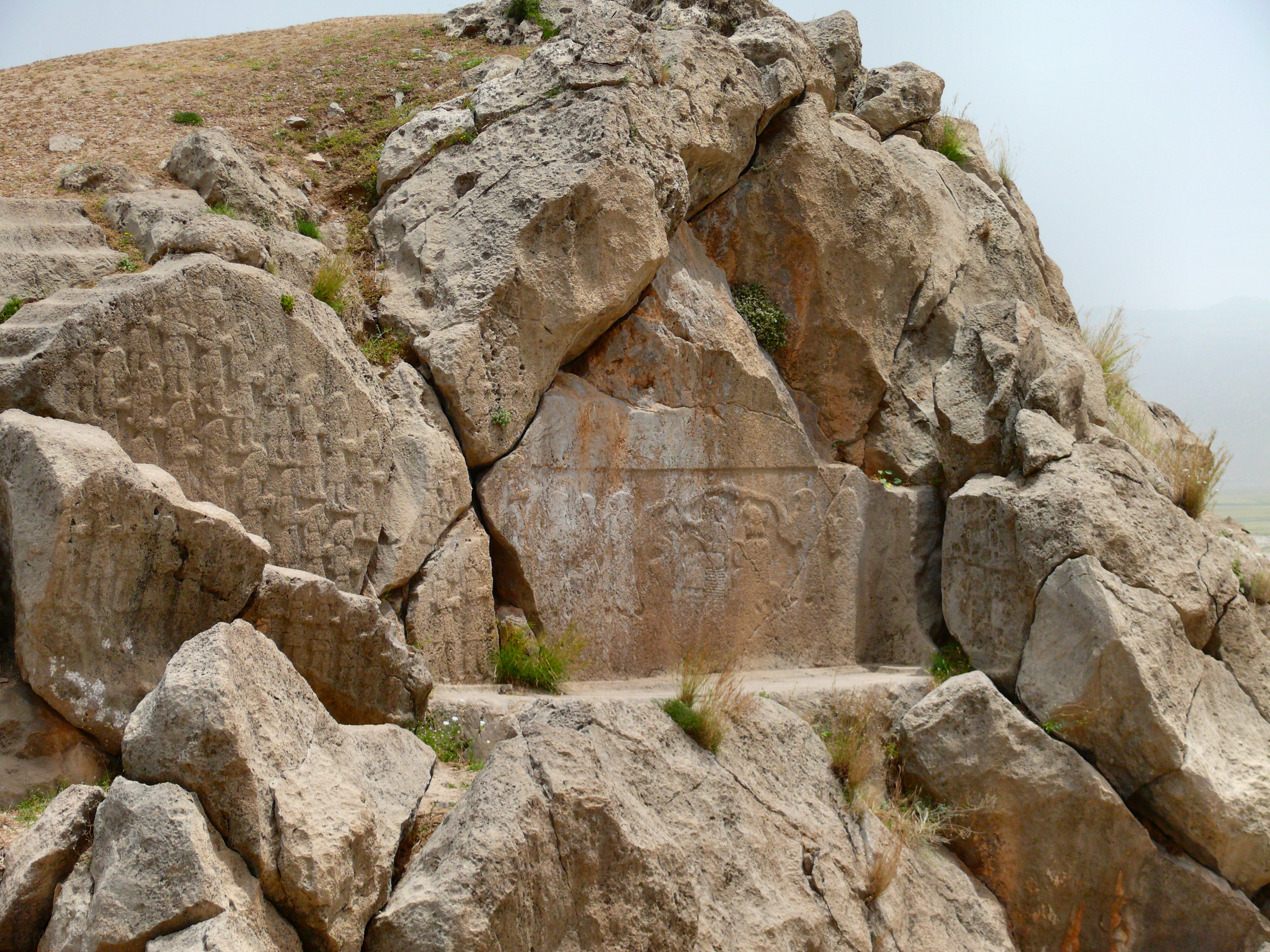
Panels of the Elamite Rock relief of Kurangun, Fahlian

== Demographics ==
The exact number of Southern Lurs is unknown, due to the absence of recent and extensive census data. The most recent documented statistics concerning their language are available for the year 1999, where is estimated about 900,000 ethnic population. Southern Lurs are predominantly Shia Muslim.

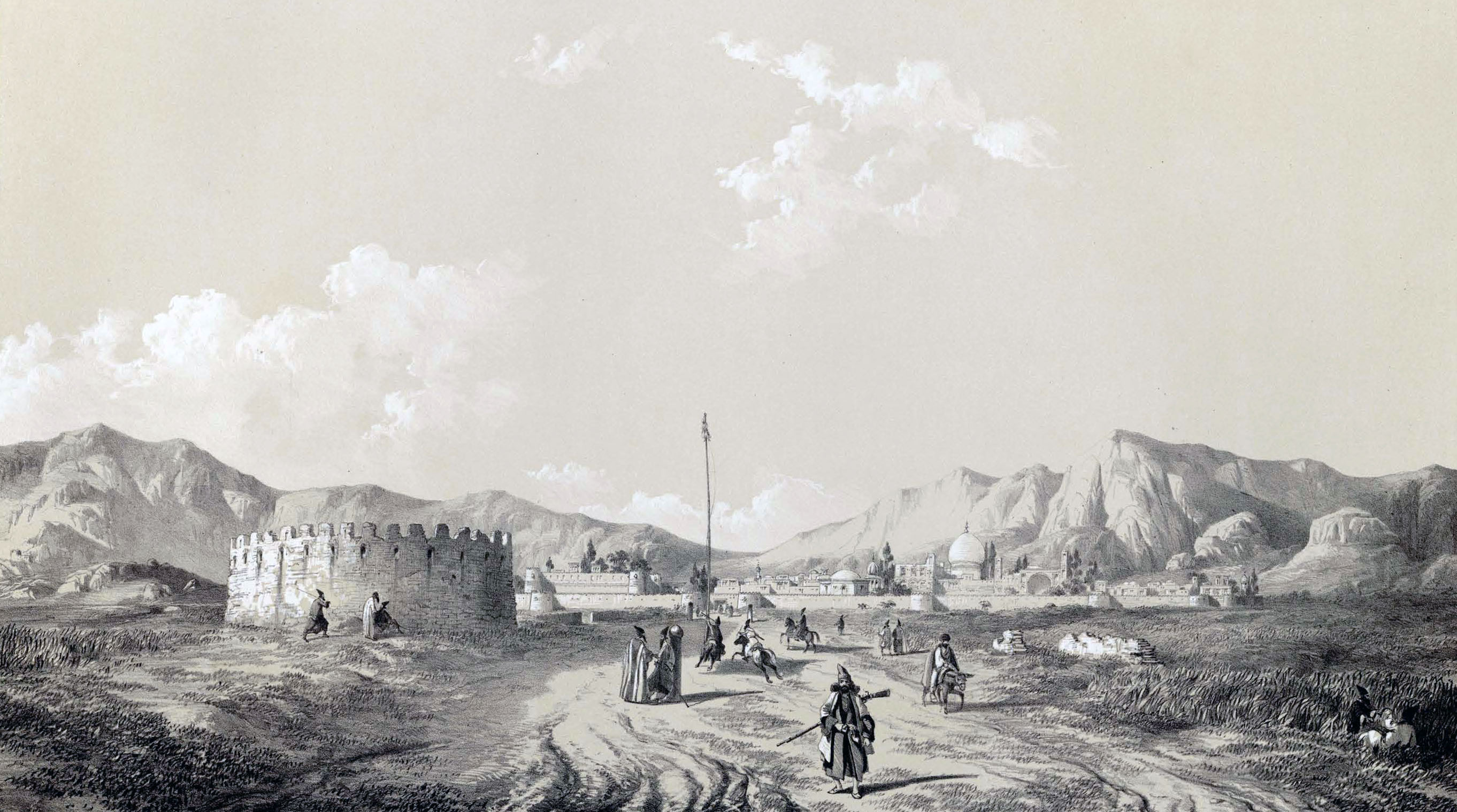
Mamasani tower by Eugène Flandin, 1851 A.D.

== Language ==
Southern Luri is the southernmost section of Luri language. Luri is a Western Iranian language continuum spoken by the Lurs in Western Asia. Luri language forms three language groups known as Central Luri, Bakhtiari, and Southern Luri. The language is derived and descended from Pahlavi language and in comparison with other Iranian languages has been less affected by foreign invaders language e.g. Arabic and Turkic.

== Culture ==
The authority of tribal elders remains a strong influence among the nomadic population. It is not as dominant among the settled urban population. As is true in other Luri communities and Kurdish societies, southern Luri women have much greater freedom than women in other groups within the region.

=== Southern Luri clothing ===
As a subdivision of Luri clothing, a special clothing system distinguishes Southern Lurs form their adjacent societies. In recent years, due to cultural changes male clothing is very less in use but female clothing is commonplace.

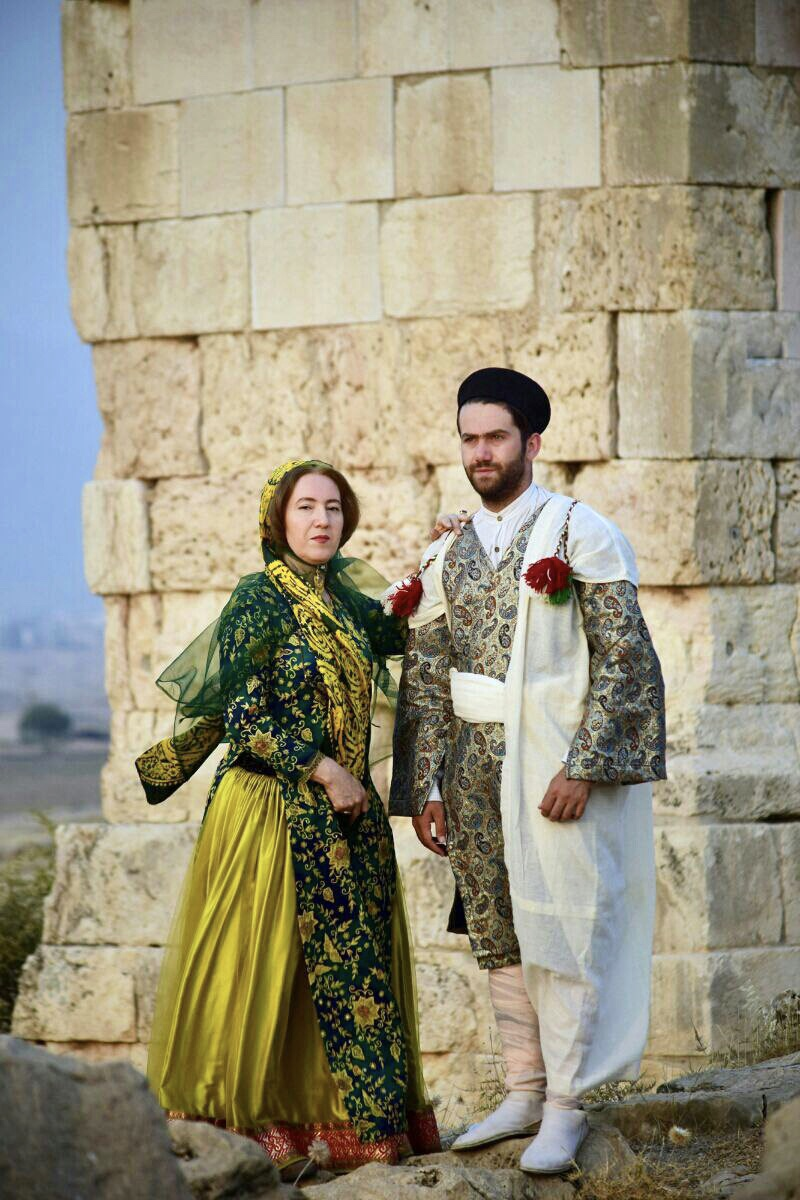
Southern Luri female and male constumes

=== Southern Luri dance ===
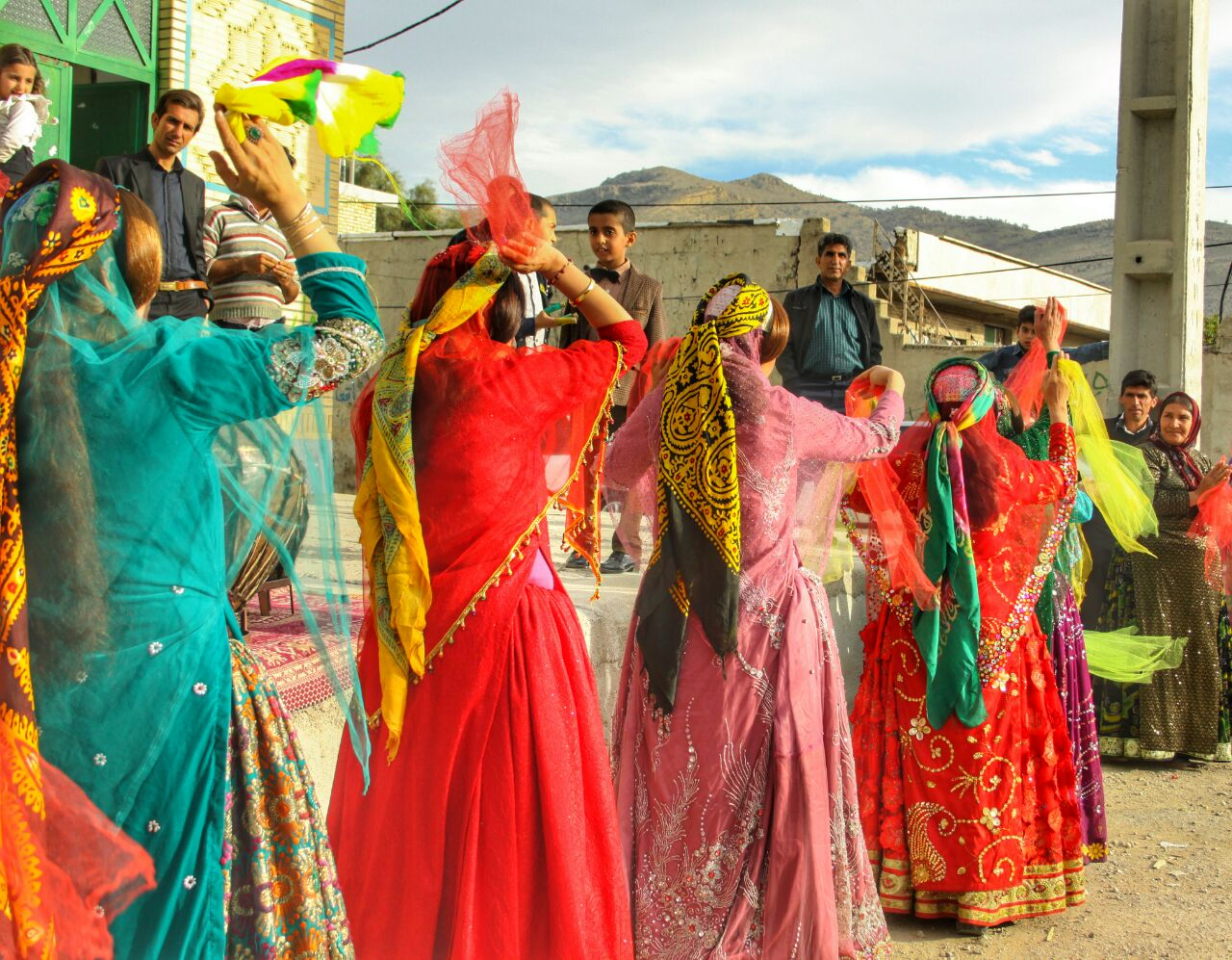
Handkerchief dancers in a wedding ceremony, Mamasani, Iran

Southern traditional dance is an integral section of their culture and probably grew in close association with traditional music. Southern Luri dances include both circle dance and dance double and like Kurdish dance it is mixed-gender that distinguishes them from other Muslim neighbors. Dasmaal Baazi (handkerchief dance) a circle dance is the most popular dance and includes different performing styles like Ashtafi-manganaa. Chubazi (twig dance) is a special dance double that is performed in Celebrations and joys and is inspired by the heroic battles.

== Notable Persons ==
KayLohraas Baatuli is a well-known local hero. who fought for years against Reza Shah Pahlavi troops in Boyer Ahmad and Mamasani.
