= Shoushtari dialect =

Southwestern Iranian dialect of Khuzestan

Shoushtari
- Šuštari, شوشترية
- Native to: Iran
- Region: Khuzestan
- Native speakers: 340,000 (including Dezfuli)
- Language family: Indo-European: Indo-Iranian; Iranian; Western; Southwestern; Persian or Luri; Dezfuli–Shoushtiari; Shoushtari

Language codes
- ISO 639-3: –
- Glottolog: shus1253

Shoushtari (Persian: شوشتری [ʃuːʃtæˈɾiː]) is a language variety spoken in and around the city of Shoushtar in Khuzestan Province in southwestern Iran. It constitutes a Southwestern Iranian dialect group with the Dezfuli dialect, which is spoken in Dezful, the adjacent city. The main difference between Dezfuli and Shoushtari is in vowel pronunciation. Linguist List has classified Shoushtri and Dezfuli as a language independent from Persian. Glottolog places the Dezfuli and Shoshtri dialects with the Luri language in a group called Luric–Dezfulic. In the article on the dialects of Khuzestan, Iranica considers the Dezfuli, Shoshtri, and Bakhtiari dialects to belong to the southern group of the Luri language.

== Personal pronouns ==
Person	Shoushtari	Dezfuli	Standard Persian
1st singular	mo	mo:	man
2nd singular	to	to:	to
3rd singular	ū	ù	ū
1st plural	amā	o:mù	mā
2nd plural	šamā	šomù	šomā
3rd plural	ūšū	ùšù	īšān (honorary), ānhā (standard)
