= Shahmirza Moradi =

Iranian musician (1924–1997)

Shahmirza Moradi شاه‌میرزا مرادی
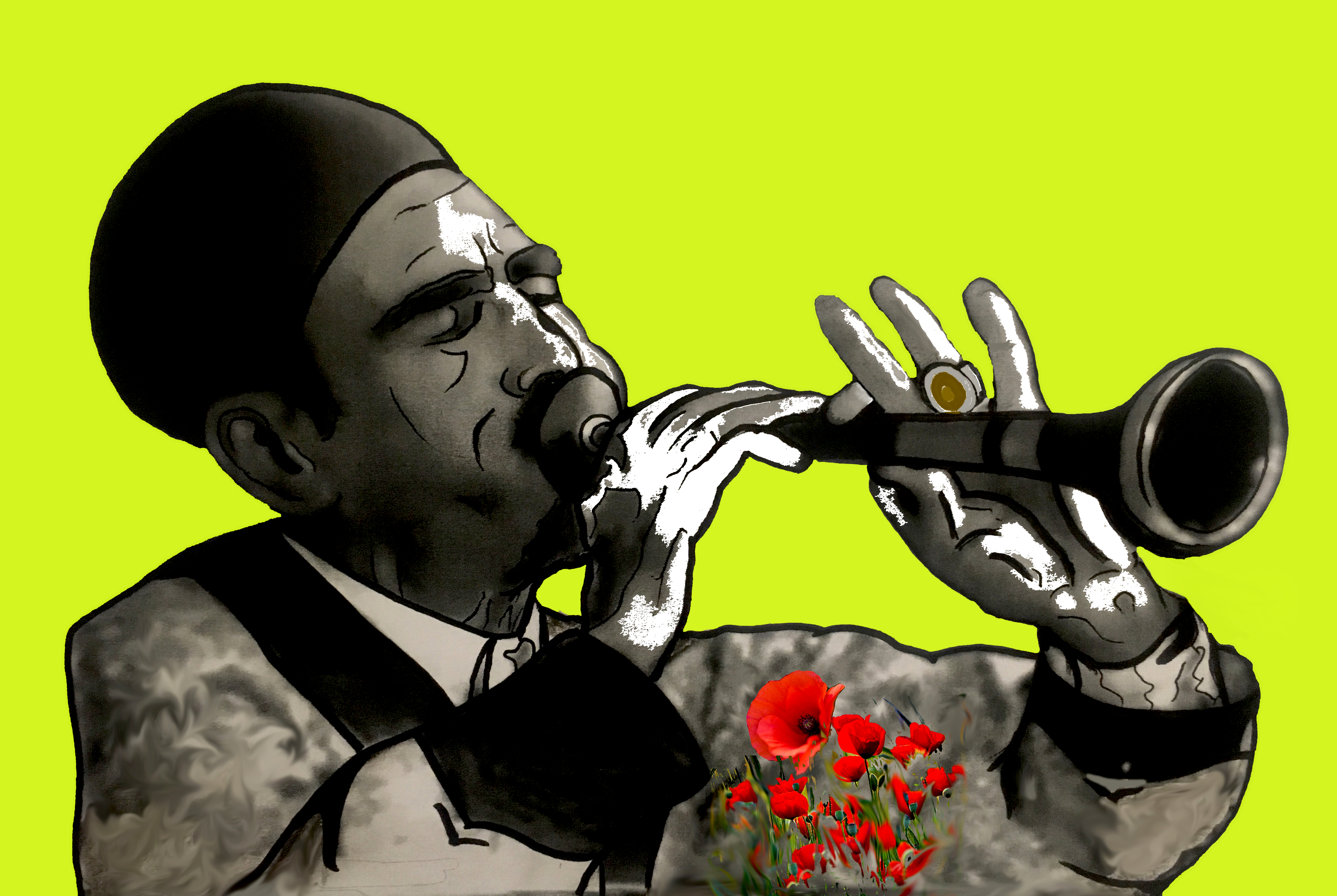
- Shahmirza Moradi Playing Sorna

Background information
- Also known as: Shahmirza
- Born: Mohammad Moradi; 14 December 1924; Dorud, Sublime State of Iran
- Died: 14 December 1997 (aged 73)
- Genres: Folk music, Luri music
- Occupation: Musician
- Instruments: Sorna, kamancheh
- Years active: c. 1969–1993

Shahmirza Moradi (Persian/Luri: شاه‌میرزا مرادی; also transliterated as Shamirza Moradi; 14 December 1924 – 14 December 1997) was an Iranian musician, who was exceptionally versed in playing sorna.

== Biography ==
Moradi was born in Dorud, Lorestan province to a Lur family. He started learning music as a child and learned Sorna from his father. In 1971, he began radio work; he then performed at the major cultural festivals in Iran, including those of Shiraz and Tehran. Thanks to the efforts of the Luri musician Ali Akbar Shekartchi, his first recordings were distributed in 1981.

In 1991, Moradi performed at the Avignon festival (southern France) and on the program of Persian nights 31 July and 1 August, at two successive concerts in the Cloître des Célestins in Paris. His son, Reza Moradi, used to accompany him on the dohol; Reza Moradi is also a kamancheh player, an instrument that he learned from his father.

== Awards ==
- Avignon Festival 1991, Paris, France Edition 45

== See also ==
- Sorna
- Luri music
- Iranian Folk Music
- Dohol
- Lorestan
