= Lion Tombstones =

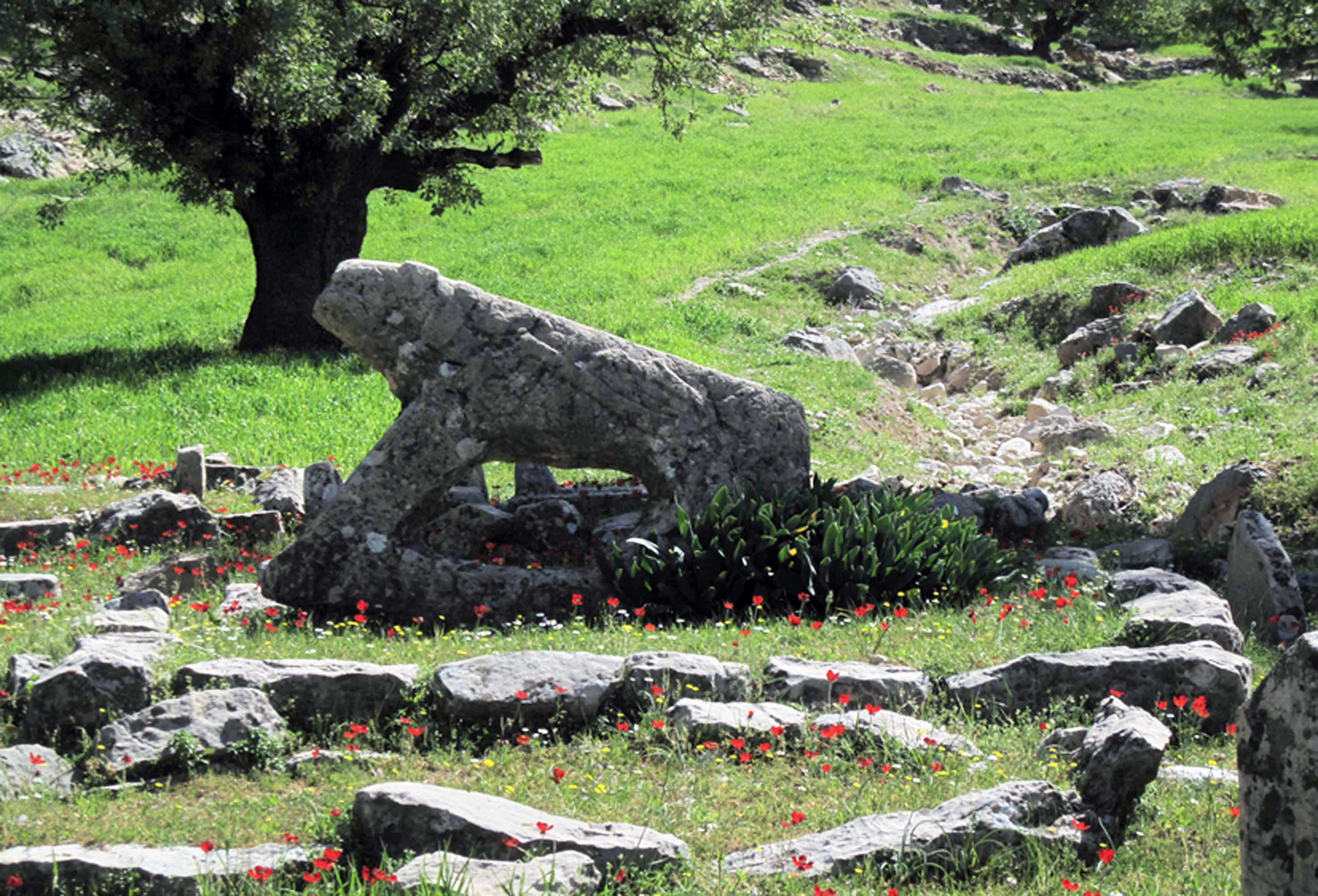
Lion Tombstone

Lion Tombstones (Persian: شیر سنگی šir-e sangi; Bakhtiari: بردشیر bardšir, meaning “stone lion”), are a type of tombstone formed in the shape of a lion. They are primarily found on the graves of Lor, Bakhtiari and Qašqāʾi nomads in the southwestern region of Iran. There were some stone lions in Ardal, Absardeh village, Chaharmahal Bakhtiari in Iran. It is a historical place and these lions were located in a domestic cemetery. Age of these stones dates back to 500 years ago.

== The lion in Bakhtiari beliefs ==
The lion (shir) is often presented in Bakhtiari oral and folklore legends as a real and wild animal. The Iranian lion (Panthera Leo Persica) was the size of the Iranian panther. This breed of lion is extinct. However, this lion lived in the regions such as the Arzhan Plain (دشت ارژن) (located about 60 kilometers to the west of Shiraz), in the mountain of Zagros and in the region of Khuzestan.

== Characteristics ==
In fact, the lion stones are statues that were made by stonemasons and placed at the graves of people from the Bakhtiari tribe in the past. The great difference in the number of these stone lions in various cemeteries could be an indication of the wealth of the individuals whose graves they mark and the sanctity of a particular burial ground.

== Today's Effects ==
Today stone lions have an important and enduring significance. In the absence of a written history, they are one way in which the Baḵtiāris are able to celebrate their past. Songs and traditions, such as traditional lamentations (gāgeriva).
