= Luri music =

Luri music is referred to an ethno-cultural characteristic of Lurs in the Middle East. Luri music enjoys a various and ancient background.

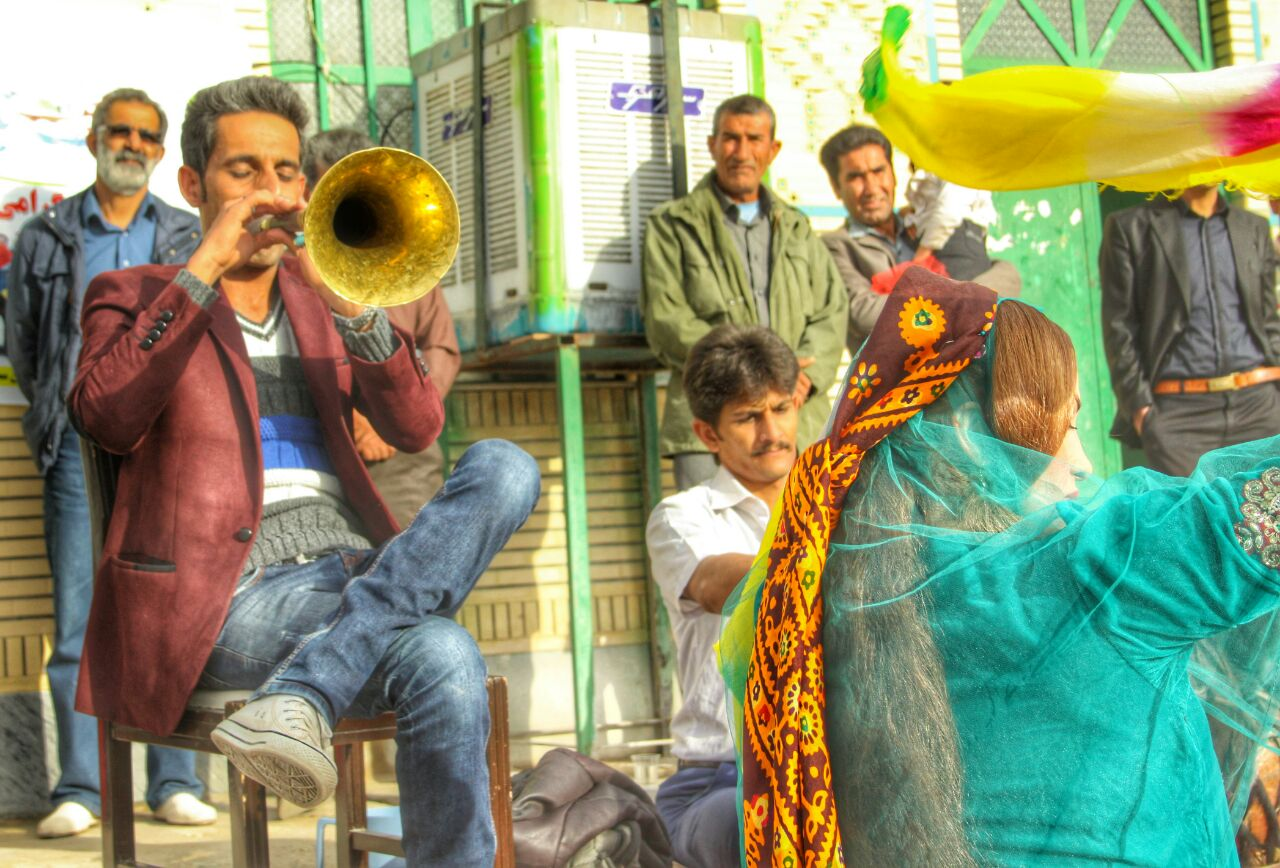
A Lur musician performing Sorna at a wedding ceremony

== Music instruments ==
The most popular Luri musical instruments include sorna, Karna, dohol, tâl (Luri kamancheh), tonbak (tomak), and the common Iranian traditional instruments. Meanwhile, the Luri kamancheh is the only one that is fundamentally different from other Iranian music instruments. The Lurs select the Mâhur as their basic musical scale to showcase the magnificence, grandeur and independence of their people.

== See also ==
- Shahmirza Moradi
