= Dezful University of Medical Sciences =

- دانشگاه علوم پزشکی و خدمات بهداشتی درمانی دزفول
- Established: 2007
- Chancellor: Dr. Alireza Khosropanah
- Administrative staff: 4300
- Students: 1,100
- Location: Dezful, Iran
- Website: dums.ac.ir

'Dezful University of Medical Sciences' (DUMS) (Persian: دانشگاه علوم پزشکی و خدمات بهداشتی درمانی دزفول) is one of the leading universities in Khuzestan province and the whole country. This university is affiliated to the Ministry of Health and Medical Education of Iran.

== University History ==
Dezful Medical Faculty initially admitted 30 students in 1372 (1992) who were considered as a quota for this faculty. However, this quota was canceled due to lack of educational facilities at the faculty after 3 years. Later, Dezful Medical Faculty admitted students through the university entrance examination, but the admitted students studied at Jundishapur University of Medical Sciences and Health Services of Ahvaz.

The procedure continued until 1386 (2007) when the Faculty of Emergency Medicine officially and physically began its activity with the admittance of 60 undergraduate students at the Faculty of Emergency Medicine in Dezful.

== Developmental stages of the university in accordance with health goals ==
1993: Faculty of Medicine
2007: Faculty of Emergency Medicine
2008: became Independent from Ahvaz University of medical sciences

== Schools and faculty members ==
DUMS consists of three schools:

- Faculty of Medicine
- Faculty of Nursing
- Faculty of Paramedical Sciences

From 2013 to 2018, the total number of faculty members increased from 28 members to 97 including 47 clinical faculty members, 21 basic sciences faculty members, and 28 instructors.

== Fields and capabilities of the university ==
- Medicine
- Internal medicine
- Nursing
- Laboratory sciences
- Anesthesia
- Surgical technology
- Medical emergency
- Public health

== DUMS Educational Hospitals ==
1. Dr.Ganjavian Hospital

== Higher education centers in the region which are under the auspices of DUMS ==
1. Dezful University of Medical Sciences
2. Jundishapur University of Technology- Dezful
3. Islamic Azad University, Dezful Branch
4. Teacher education center of Shahid Rajaee, Dezful
5. Teacher education center of Khadija Kobra, Dezful
6. Payame Noor University of Dezful
7. Center of applied science and technology, Dezful
8. Islamic Azad University, Shush Branch
9. Payame Noor University of Shush
10. Islamic Azad University, Gotvand Branch
11. Payame Noor University of Gotvand
