= Borujerdi dialect =

Luri dialect of Lorestan, Iran

- Native to: Iran
- Region: Central Zagros
- Native speakers: (undated figure of ca. 0.8 million)
- Language family: Indo-European: Indo-Iranian; Iranian; Western Iranian; Southwestern Iranian; Luri; Northern Luri; Borujerdi dialect

Language codes
- ISO 639-3: –
- Glottolog: boru1243

The Borujerdi dialect (Persian: گویش بروجردی)‌ is a dialect of Luri language spoken in Borujerd city and its surrounding areas in the province of Lorestan in Iran. Borujerdi is more similar to Northern Luri than the Persian language, spoken in other parts of Lorestan, being in some aspects completely different.

== Linguistic dependency ==
Ethnologue and Linguist List introduce Borujerdi as a Northern Luri dialect. Encyclopædia Iranica mentions Borujerd as one of the as one of the important centers of North Luri dialects. Dehkhoda Dictionary considers the language of Borujerd County's inhabitants as Persian Luri.
