= Atlas of the Languages of Iran =

Interactive language atlas of Iran's languages and dialects

- Website type: Online atlas
- Available in: English; Persian
- Area served: Linguistics; Geolinguistics; Linguistic map Linguistic typology Language documentation Iranian languages
- Creators: Geomatics and Cartographic Research Centre (GCRC) at Carleton University; Shahrekord University
- Founder: Erik John Anonby
- Editors: Erik Anonby, Mortaza Taheri-Ardali
- Website: iranatlas.net
- Launched: 2015
- Current status: Active

The online Atlas of the Languages of Iran (ALI) is a collection of interactive language distribution maps and linguistic maps of the languages spoken across Iran. The atlas is developed and maintained at the Geomatics and Cartographic Research Center (GCRC) at Carleton University in Ottawa, Canada. The maps on the atlas are searchable and illustrate patterns in the phonology, morphosyntax, and lexicon of languages spoken in Iran. As the atlas is interactive, users are free to access the data and information represented on the maps, and they are encouraged to contribute and comment on the language data for each location.

== Language maps ==
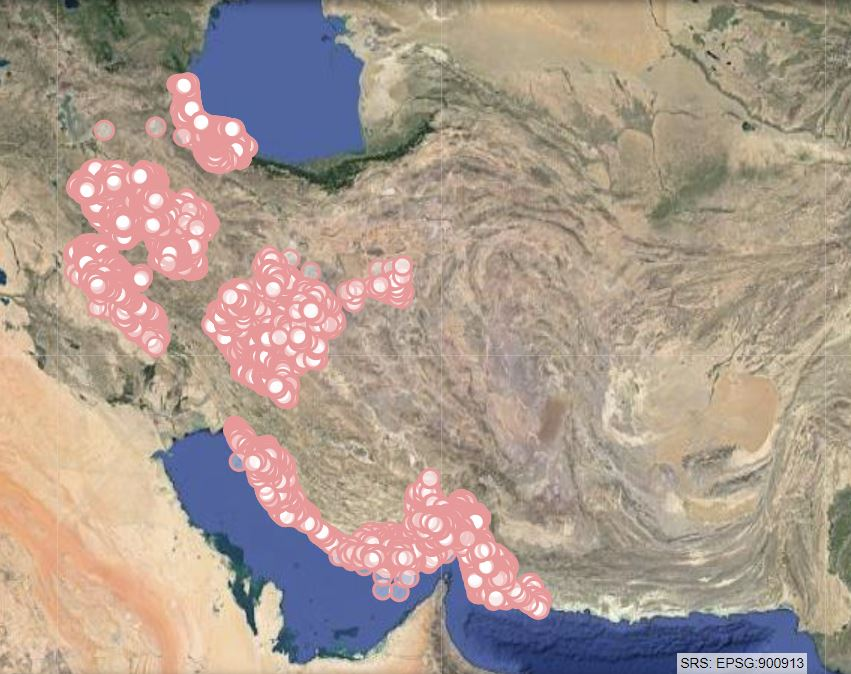
Language distribution map, country-level

The primary goal of this atlas is to provide an overview of the language situation in Iran. The atlas provides both interactive language distribution maps and static linguistic maps.The language distribution maps show language varieties spoken across the Provinces of Iran alongside an estimation of the number of speakers for each variety.

== Language classification ==
The Atlas of the Languages of Iran (ALI) presents a working classification of the languages of Iran using the traditional classification tree, based on the works of linguists and other scholars.

The language classification tree is also represented as a three-dimensional force graph web visualizing language varieties and different types of links between them: genealogical inheritance, areal similarity, and ethnic identification.

== Resources ==
Resources used for language data collection and documentation throughout the process of building ALI have been provided on the atlas's page. The bibliography contains a list of references that are used and/or cited in the atlas.

=== Questionnaire ===
The ALI linguistic data questionnaire, available in English and Persian, has been developed specifically for the languages of Iran and is used to collect language data across the country. The questionnaire consists of three main parts: Lexicon, Morphosyntax, and Numbers using which linguists collect lexical and morphosyntactic data in fieldwork sessions. The collected lexical data is considered as an important resource for future electronic Etymological dictionaries for the languages of Iran. In addition to the language data, the questionnaire contains Sociolinguistic context questions that provide detailed information about the interview respondents' linguistic background and language use as these factors directly affect the elicited language data.
