= Jundi-shapur University of Technology =

Iranian university

Coordinates: 32.43088°N 48.36548°E

Jundi Shapur University of Technology
- Type: Public
- Location: Iran
- Website: jsu.ac.ir

Jundi-Shapur University of Technology (Persian: دانشگاه صنعتی جندی‌شاپور دزفول) is a public technical university in Iran, located in the city of Dezful in northern Khuzestan Province. This university was established in 1987 (1366 in the Iranian calendar) as the Dezful Higher Education Center under the supervision of Jundi-Shapur University of Ahvaz. In 1988 (1367), Jundi-Shapur University of Ahvaz was renamed Shahid Chamran University. In 1991 (1370), following the upgrading of this center to the Jundi-Shapur Faculty of Dezful, the name Jundi-Shapur was revived.

Jundi-Shapur University of Technology ranks 16th among the country's industrial universities in the latest ISC ranking for 1403 (2024–2025). Since 1389 (2010–2011), the ranking of Iranian universities has, following government approval, been entrusted to the Ministry of Science, Research and Technology and the Ministry of Health and Medical Education to the Islamic World Science and Technology Citation and Monitoring Institute (ISC).

== Faculties ==
The university has 5 faculties and 2 academic departments.

- Faculty of Basic Sciences
- Faculty of Electrical Engineering and Computer Engineering
- Faculty of Civil Engineering
- Faculty of Mechanical Engineering
- Faculty of Architecture and Urban Planning
- Department of Chemistry
- Department of Islamic Studies

The university offers 14 undergraduate programs, 13 master's degree programs, and 3 doctoral programs.
