= Dezful =

City in Khuzestan province, Iran

Dezful Persian: دزفول
- City
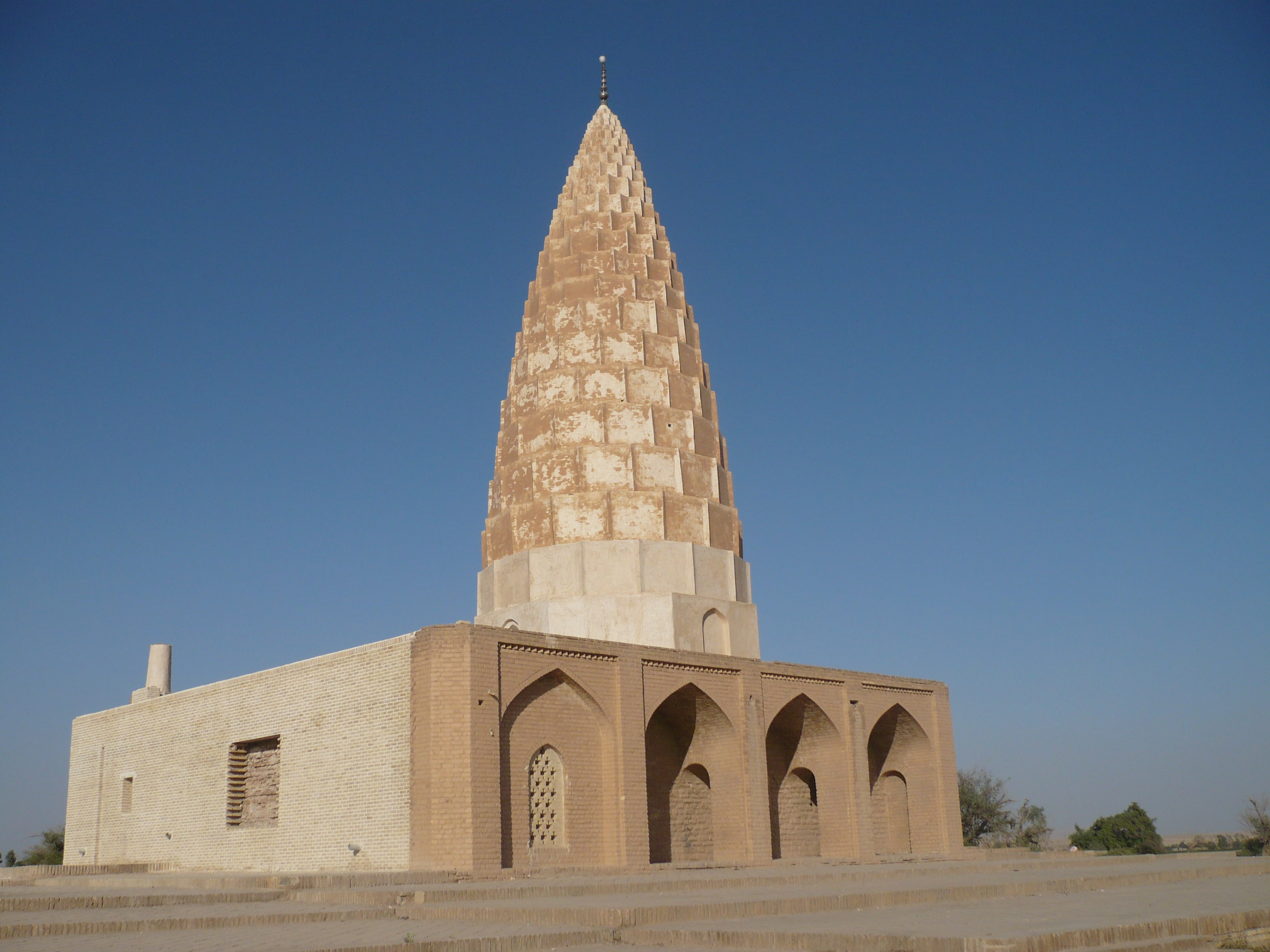
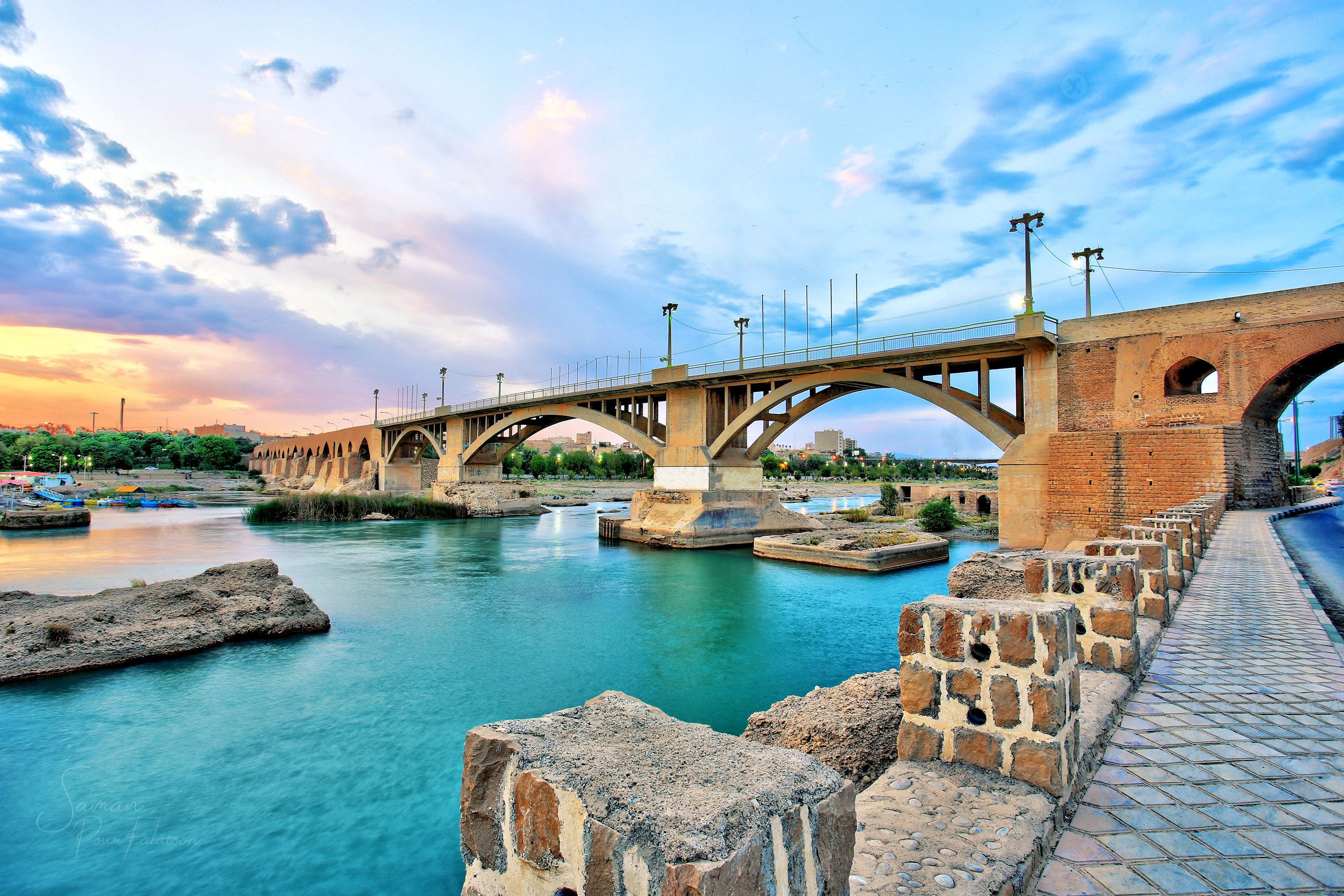
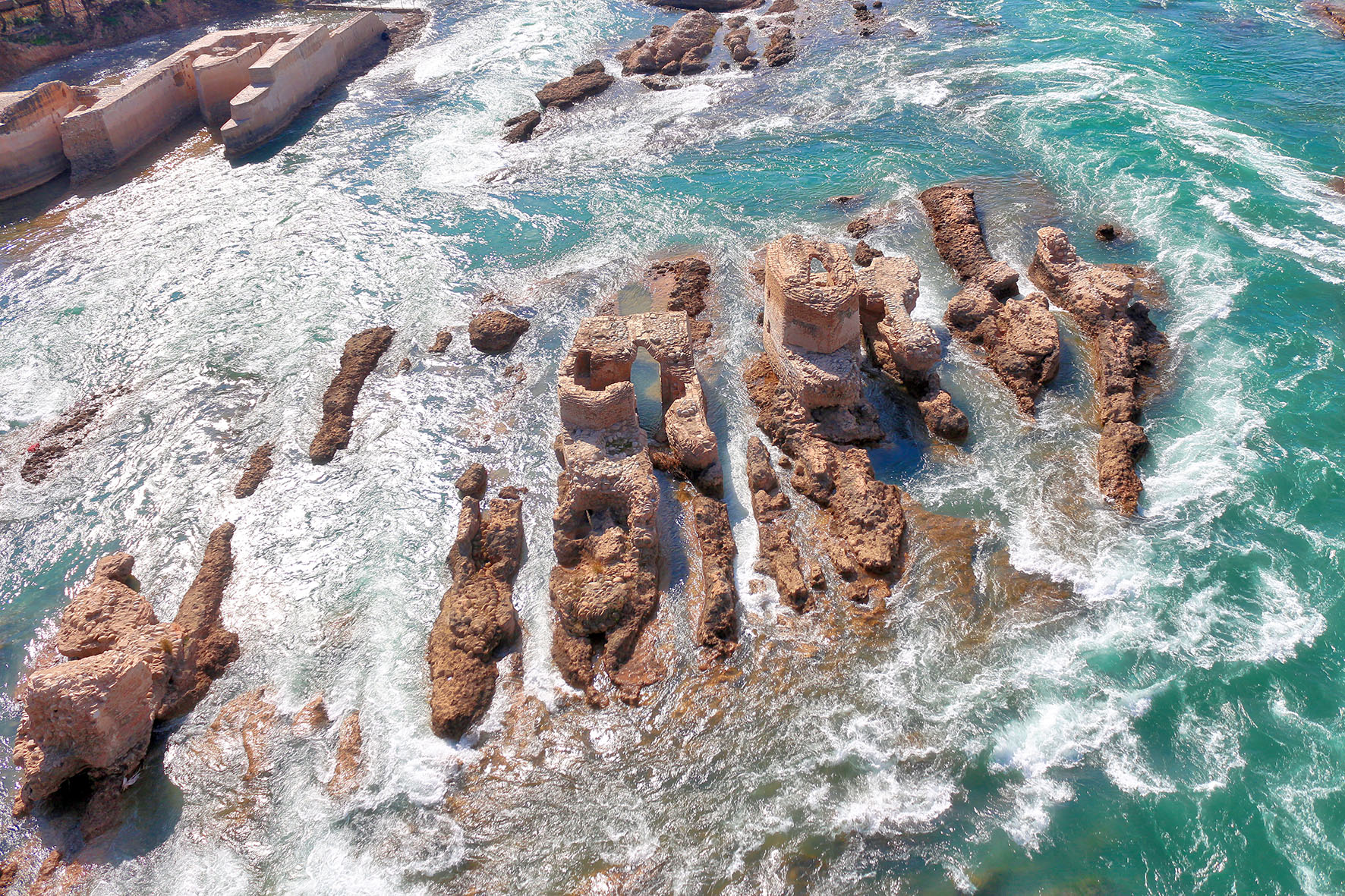
- Nicknames: دسفیل ,دژپل, desfeal, dezhpoll
- Location within Iran
- Coordinates: 32°22′43″N 48°24′52″E
- Country: Iran
- Province: Khuzestan
- County: Dezful
- District: Central
- Elevation: 150 m (490 ft)

Population (2016)
  - Urban: 264,709
  - Metro: 443,971
- Time zone: UTC+3:30 (IRST)
- Postal code: 646xx-xxxxx
- Area code: 061

Dezful (Persian: دزفول; pronounced [dɛzˈfuːl, dɛsˈfuːl]) (Note: Dezfuli dialect: Desfil, pronounced [desˈfiːl]); also romanized as Dezfool and Dezfūl; also known as Ab-e Diz and Dīzfūl) is a city in the Central District of Dezful County, Khuzestan province, Iran, serving as capital of both the county and the district.

== History ==
Dezful is one of Khuzestan province's oldest cities. According to excavations by the German historian and archaeologist Walther Hinz, Awan (capital of the first dynasty of Elam, the Awan dynasty) was located in Dezful.

The name Dezfūl is believed to be associated with a Sasanian bridge constructed over the Āb-e Dez by Shapur II. The Sasanians also built a fortress in close proximity to protect the bridge. This area, encompassing the bridge and the fortress, eventually evolved into the city of Dež-Pol or Dezfūl, although this name was not commonly used until the 12th century. In the 10th century, the writer Eṣṭaḵrī referred to it as Qanṭarat-al-Andāmeš. It was also known as Qaṣr al-Rūnāš. The stone foundation of the bridge is still visible, while the upper part underwent several brick reconstructions during the early Islamic, Saljuq, and Qajar periods. In the 14th century, Ḥamd-Allāh Mostāwfī described it as 520 paces long and 15 paces wide, with forty-two arches. Šaraf-al-Dīn Yazdī, who visited the area in 795/1393, also provided a detailed description.

The Ranashi Dynasty was centered in Dezful from its foundation until its fall in 1542/3 (949 AH). The Dynasty was a vassal of the Safavid Empire from 1508 to 1514.

According to George Curzon, who visited the area in the late 19th century, the principal local industry in Dezfūl was indigo, with 120 factories in the town. The cultivation of indigo was introduced in the early 19th century. Dezfūl was also renowned for its fine reed pens.

== Etymology ==
The name Dezful has been derived from the two words dej (fortress) + pul (bridge), which in combination could stand for 'the bridge to the fortress' or 'fortified bridge' in the Persian language. The original name of the city was Dezhpul, but after the Muslim conquest of Persia, the city was renamed Dezful, since the Arabic language does not have 'p' and 'zh' sounds. The city is also known as Dizful and Desful.

== Demographics ==
=== Language ===
The people of Dezful, known as Dezfuli, Dezfoolian or Dezfulian, speak Dezfuli – a dialect distinct to Dezful – and Shushtari, a dialect of Shushtar that is sometimes considered to be one of the most archaic dialects spoken in the Iranian plateau, and by others as a dialect of the Persian language. These dialects belong to the Southwest Iranian language group. Although they share some similarities with nearby Lor dialects, they are still distinct.

However, they differ significantly from standard Persian in terms of pronunciation, word formation, and vocabulary. The most notable distinctions are found in the structure of verbs. The differences between Dezfuli and Shushtari are mainly a result of variations in the detailed sound patterns of the language.

Historically, Dezful was home to a Mandaean community for many centuries. One of Dezful's best-known residents was the Mandaean priest Ram Zihrun.

=== Population ===
At the time of the 2006 National Census, the city's population was 228,507 in 55,711 households. The following census in 2011 counted 248,380 people in 66,715 households. The 2016 census measured the population of the city as 264,709 people in 78,348 households.

== Geography ==
Dezful is 650 kilometers away from the national capital of Tehran and 155 kilometres away from Ahvaz, the provincial capital of Khuzestan. The city is located 300 kilometres from the Persian Gulf and is at an altitude of 143 meters.

The city lies at the foot of the Zagros Mountains and has a history that dates back to the Sasanian era. The area around Dezful has been home to civilizations for 5000 years.

Dezful sits on the main north–south highway from Tehran to Ahvaz. The main rail line from Tehran to the Persian Gulf is 15 km (9 mi) from Dezful, on the opposite side of the Dez River.

=== Climate ===
Dezful has a hot semi-arid climate (Köppen climate classification BSh) with extremely hot summers and mild winters. Rainfall is higher than most of southern Iran, but is almost exclusively confined to the period from November to April, sometimes with thunderstorms, though on occasions it can exceed 250 millimetres (9.8 in) per month or 600 millimetres (24 in) per year. Dust is common in the region and happens most frequently in summer.

In 2020, for the first time, the city of Dezful witnessed snowfall.

Climate data for Dezful (extremes for 1961-2010)
Month	Jan	Feb	Mar	Apr	May	Jun	Jul	Aug	Sep	Oct	Nov	Dec	Year
Record high °C (°F)	28.5 (83.3)	29.0 (84.2)	37.5 (99.5)	42.5 (108.5)	48.4 (119.1)	50.0 (122.0)	53.6 (128.5)	52.0 (125.6)	49.8 (121.6)	43.5 (110.3)	35.0 (95.0)	30.2 (86.4)	53.6 (128.5)
Mean daily maximum °C (°F)	17.2 (63.0)	19.6 (67.3)	24.1 (75.4)	30.0 (86.0)	37.5 (99.5)	43.7 (110.7)	46.0 (114.8)	44.9 (112.8)	41.7 (107.1)	34.8 (94.6)	26.2 (79.2)	19.3 (66.7)	32.1 (89.8)
Daily mean °C (°F)	10.8 (51.4)	13.2 (55.8)	17.3 (63.1)	22.8 (73.0)	29.9 (85.8)	35.1 (95.2)	37.0 (98.6)	35.8 (96.4)	32.0 (89.6)	25.6 (78.1)	17.9 (64.2)	12.5 (54.5)	24.2 (75.5)
Mean daily minimum °C (°F)	5.3 (41.5)	6.8 (44.2)	10.0 (50.0)	14.7 (58.5)	20.5 (68.9)	23.8 (74.8)	26.2 (79.2)	25.5 (77.9)	21.1 (70.0)	16.2 (61.2)	10.8 (51.4)	6.8 (44.2)	15.6 (60.2)
Record low °C (°F)	−9.0 (15.8)	−4.0 (24.8)	−2.0 (28.4)	3.0 (37.4)	10.0 (50.0)	16.0 (60.8)	19.0 (66.2)	16.5 (61.7)	10.0 (50.0)	6.0 (42.8)	1.0 (33.8)	−2.0 (28.4)	−9.0 (15.8)
Average rainfall mm (inches)	100.6 (3.96)	60.0 (2.36)	50.2 (1.98)	34.5 (1.36)	9.2 (0.36)	0.0 (0.0)	0.2 (0.01)	0.0 (0.0)	0.0 (0.0)	7.4 (0.29)	39.1 (1.54)	83.2 (3.28)	384.4 (15.14)
Average rainy days	9.9	8.1	8.1	6.5	3.0	0.0	0.1	0.0	0.0	2.1	6.2	8.0	52
Average relative humidity (%)	75	68	59	49	32	22	24	28	29	40	59	73	47
Average dew point °C (°F)	5.7 (42.3)	6.4 (43.5)	7.9 (46.2)	9.7 (49.5)	9.1 (48.4)	7.8 (46.0)	11.1 (52.0)	12.2 (54.0)	9.0 (48.2)	8.7 (47.7)	8.4 (47.1)	7.0 (44.6)	8.6 (47.5)
Mean monthly sunshine hours	131.6	158.4	192.3	217.7	272.5	325.6	322.7	317.0	291.3	234.8	158.2	121.9	2,744
Source 1: NOAA (1961-1990)
Source 2: IRIMO

Climate data for Dezful
Month	Jan	Feb	Mar	Apr	May	Jun	Jul	Aug	Sep	Oct	Nov	Dec	Year
No. of days with minimum temperature≤ 0.0 °C (32.0 °F)	3.0	0.7	0.4	0	0	0	0	0	0	0	0	0.9	5.0
Mean number of days with thunder	1.6	1.6	2.7	3.0	2.0	0.1	0.1	0.1	0.0	1.6	2.7	2.1	17.6
Mean number of days with Dust	2.2	4.4	8.2	9.5	14.6	17.5	19.2	16.7	10.8	8.9	3.7	2.2	118

== Economy ==
Sugarcane, which has been cultivated in the Dezfūl region for more than a thousand years, is still an important economic factor; a modern sugar refinery with a capacity of more than 300 tons has been built in Haft Tappa near the town of Dezfūl. Other major agricultural products of the šahrestān include wheat, barley, clover, alfalfa, sesame, maize, and grass peas; sheep are the most important livestock

=== Artisan work ===
The Dezful reed pen is one of the important commercial products that has been cultivated in Dezful for the past three hundred years and is recognized as the finest reed pen at the national and global levels. In the past, the Dezful reed pen was exported to countries like Turkey and China, and it is still exported to most cities in Iran.

Dezful is also known for its handmade wooden tools, including hookah bases, hookahs, candlesticks, coat hangers, and salt shakers. Additionally, the city's handicraft traditions encompass metalwork, such as varshoosazi (crafting items from a Nickle Silver), engraving on gold and silver, and goldsmithing.

In the varshoosazi workshops of Dezful's old bazaar, artisans craft tools for tea drinking and other purposes. The craft of varshoosazi (the making of varsho items) in Iran dates back to the Safavid era, but its peak occurred during the Qajar era and continued into the Pahlavi era. Varsho metal sheets, also known as German silver or Nickle Silver, were imported from Germany, particularly from Poland. This is why Iranian artisans named the metal varsho (Warsaw), after the city of Warsaw, the capital of Poland, and the craft became known as varshoosazi. Artisans from Isfahan, Borujerd, and Dezful were the first to learn how to produce varsho crafts by observing Russian samovars and other products. The varshoosazi industry reached its height in Iran, particularly in the cities of Dezful and Borujerd, during the late Qajar and early Pahlavi eras. Many individuals adopted the surname Varshoochi or Varshabi in Dezful because it was closely associated with their profession as varsho craftsmen.

== Higher Education ==
Dezful is home to various higher education institutions, each offering various academic and professional programs. These institutions have played an integral role in promoting education, research, and professional development in khuzetsan, significantly contributing to Dezful's academic and cultural richness.

- Dezful University of Medical Sciences
- Jundi-Shapur University of Technology (Dezful)
- Islamic Azad University of Dezful
- University of Applied Science and Technology (Dezful Applied Science and Technology Center)
- Payame Noor University of Dezful
- Khadijeh Kobra Higher Education Center (Farhangian University)
- Sheikh Morteza Ansari Higher Education Center (Farhangian University)

== Historic monuments ==
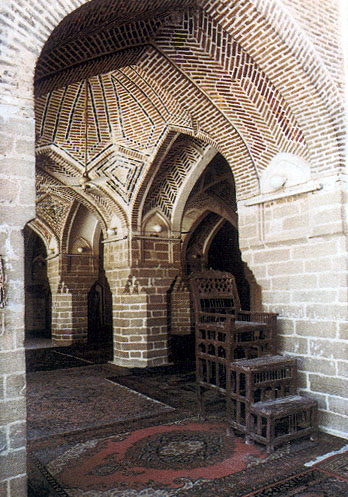
Dezful Jame' Mosque

In an area with a history that extends back to ancient civilization, the city houses a bridge that dates back to 300 AD.

== Transportation ==
There are direct flights from Tehran to Dezful (and reverse) at least twice a day. There are also weekly flights from Dezful to Mashhad (mawhad or mašhad). Dezful can also be reached by the Iranian railways.

Buses are available from almost all Iranian major cities to Dezful or one of its adjacent cities. Trains of the Trans-Iranian Railway serve the neighbouring town of Andimeshk.

== Twin towns – sister cities ==
- Tyre, Lebanon

== Notable people ==
- Abdulrahman Nafisi (1948–1990), bank manager
- Gholam Ali Rashid (1953–2025), Iranian commander from Dezful
- Mohammad-Ali Ramin (born 1954), former Vice Minister of Culture
- Morteza Ansari (1781–1864), a famous Shia jurisprudent

== See also ==
- Battle of Dezful

== Sources ==
- Iran Census organization
