= Old Bridge of Dezful =

Historic bridge in Dezful, Iran

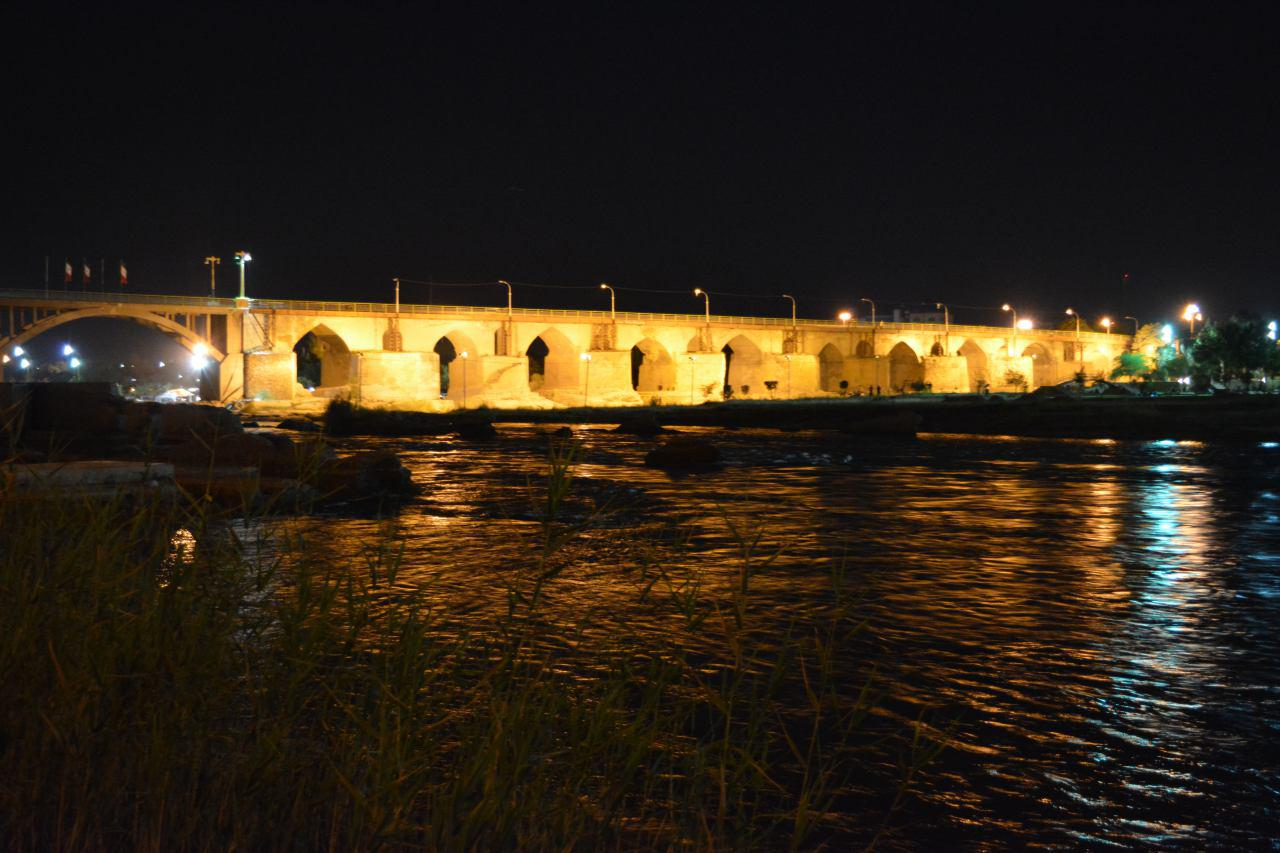
- Old Bridge of Dezful in Night
- Coordinates: 32.3816°N 48.3908°E

Iran National Heritage List
- Official name: Old Bridge of Dezful
- Type: Bridge
- Designated: 1932
- Reference no.: 84
- Conservation organization: Cultural Heritage, Handicrafts and Tourism Organization of Iran
- Crosses: Dez River
- Locale: Dezful, Iran

Characteristics
- Design: Roman arch bridge
- Material: Stone
- Total length: 385.5 m (1,265 ft)
- Width: 9.5 m (31 ft)
- Height: 15 m (49 ft)
- No. of spans: 14

History
- Designer: Shapour I
- Construction end: 260 AD

Location
- Interactive map of Old Bridge of Dezful

The Old Bridge of Dezful (Persian: پل قدیم دزفول) is located near the city of Dezful in South Western Iran. This bridge connects the western and eastern parts of the city of Dezful.

== History ==
The design of the bridge in its current state is 1700 years old and goes back to the Sasanian era, however the original foundation of the bridge was built during the Elamite era. During the Islamic period, the bridge underwent architectural and structural changes. The round arches were replaced by four-centred arches.

== Gallery ==
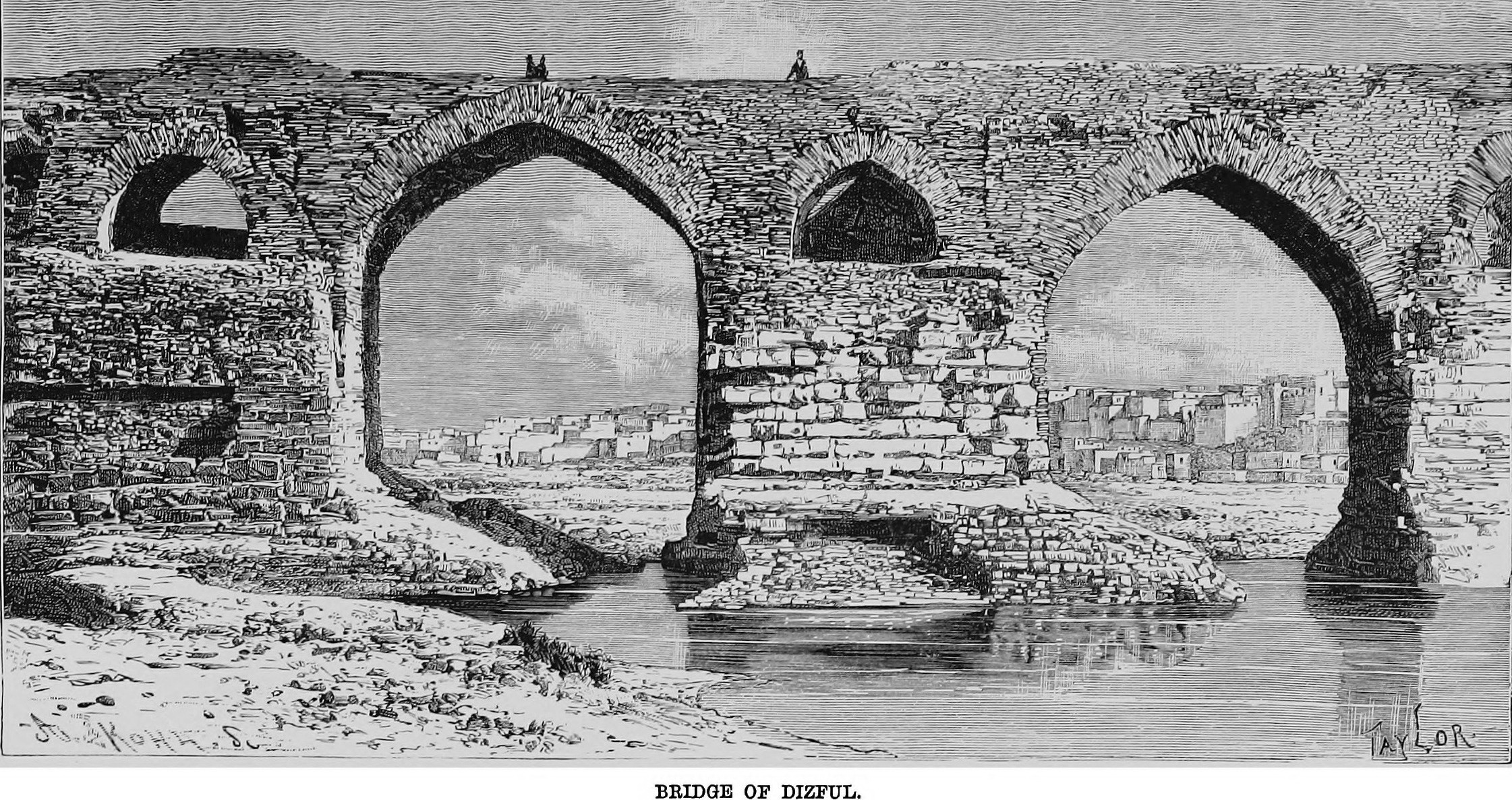
Bridge of Dezful, 1870s

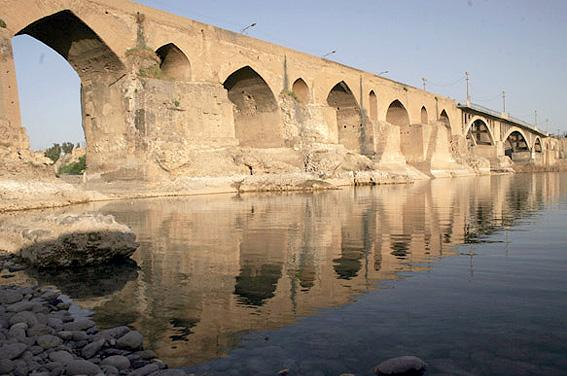
The Old Bridge of Dezful

== See also ==
- Alcántara Bridge
- List of Roman bridges
