= Dezfuli dialect =

Southwestern Iranian dialect of Khuzestan, Iran

Dezfuli
- Dezfuli, Pārsi-e Dezfuli
- Native to: Iran
- Region: Khuzestan
- Ethnicity: Dezfulis
- Native speakers: 340,000 (including Shushtari)
- Language family: Indo-European: Indo-Iranian; Iranian; Western; Southwestern; Persian or Luri–Dezfuli; Dezfuli–Shushtari; Dezfuli

Language codes
- ISO 639-3: def
- Glottolog: dezf1239

Dezfuli (Persian: دزفولی [dezfuːˈliː]) is one of the southwestern dialects of Iran, which is the dialect of a part of the people of Dezful, who are known as Dezfuli. Dezfuli and Shushtari share common features with the surrounding Luri dialects. Glottolog places Dezfuli-Shushtari dialects in a group called Luri-Dezfuli, which, while being separate from Luri and New Persian, have a similar status to Luri. However, other linguists indicate that Dezfuli is a dialect of the Persian language that has been influenced by Luri. In the article on the dialects of Khuzestan, Iranica considers the Dezfuli-Shoshtri and Bakhtiari dialects to belong to the southern group of the Luri language.

== Personal pronouns ==
Person	Dezfuli	Shushtari	Standard Persian
1st singular	mo	mo	man
2nd singular	to	to	to
3rd singular	ū	ū	ū
1st plural	omù	amā	mā
2nd plural	šomù	šamā	šomā
3rd plural	ūšù	ūšù	īšān (honorary), ānhā (standard)
