= Luri clothing =

Clothing from the Lurish region of Iran

Luri culture has been developed along with the long history of coexistence among Lurs with surrounding natural elements across the Iranian plateau, and geographical, cultural and religious effects.

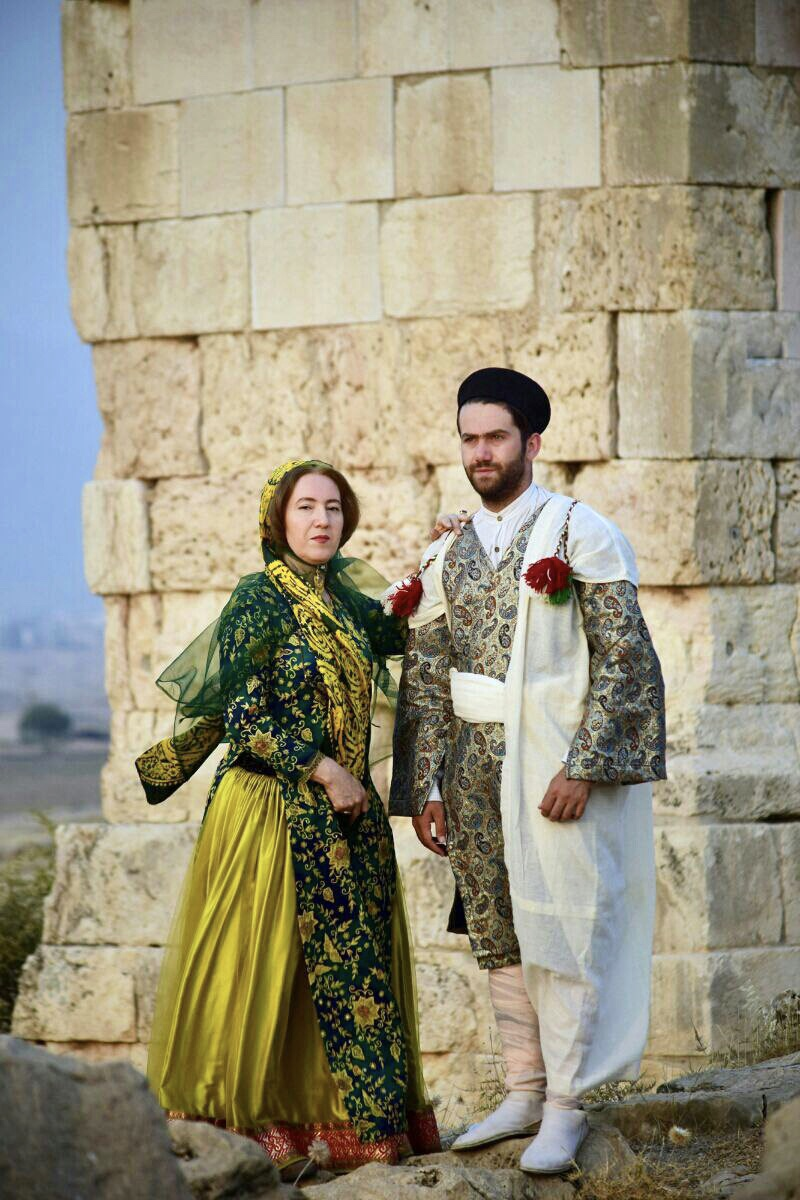
Southern Lur Female and Male Costumes

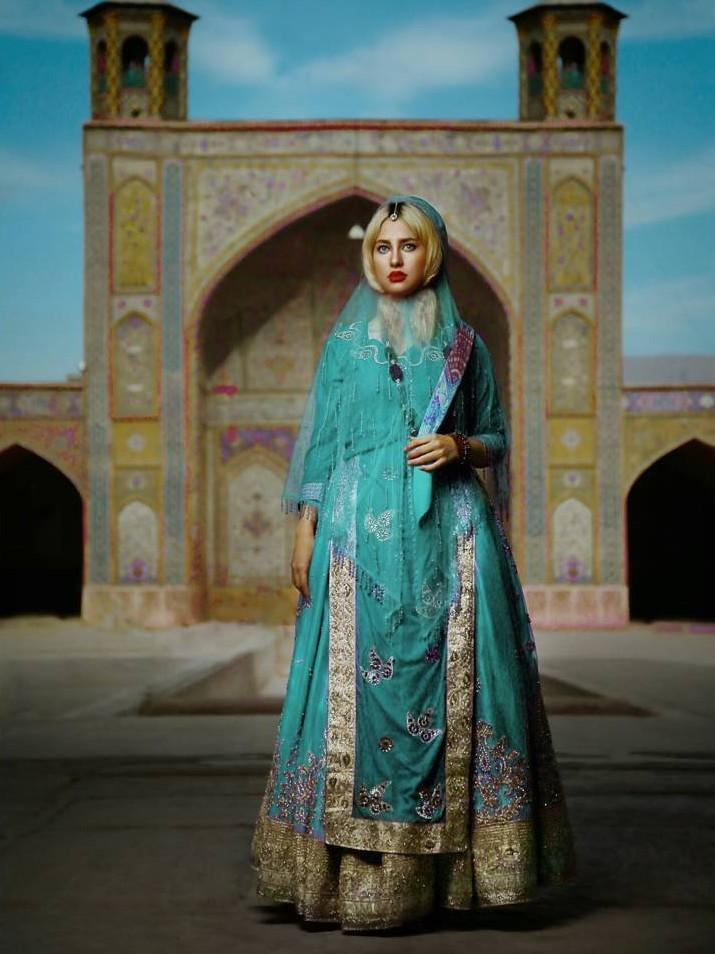
Costume of Mamasani, Kohgiluyeh and Boyer-Ahmad and Southern Lurs

== Men's clothing ==
=== Felt hats ===
Felt hats (کُلأ نِمِدی): A round felt made that has no edges and sometimes is surrounded by Golvani.

=== Chugha ===
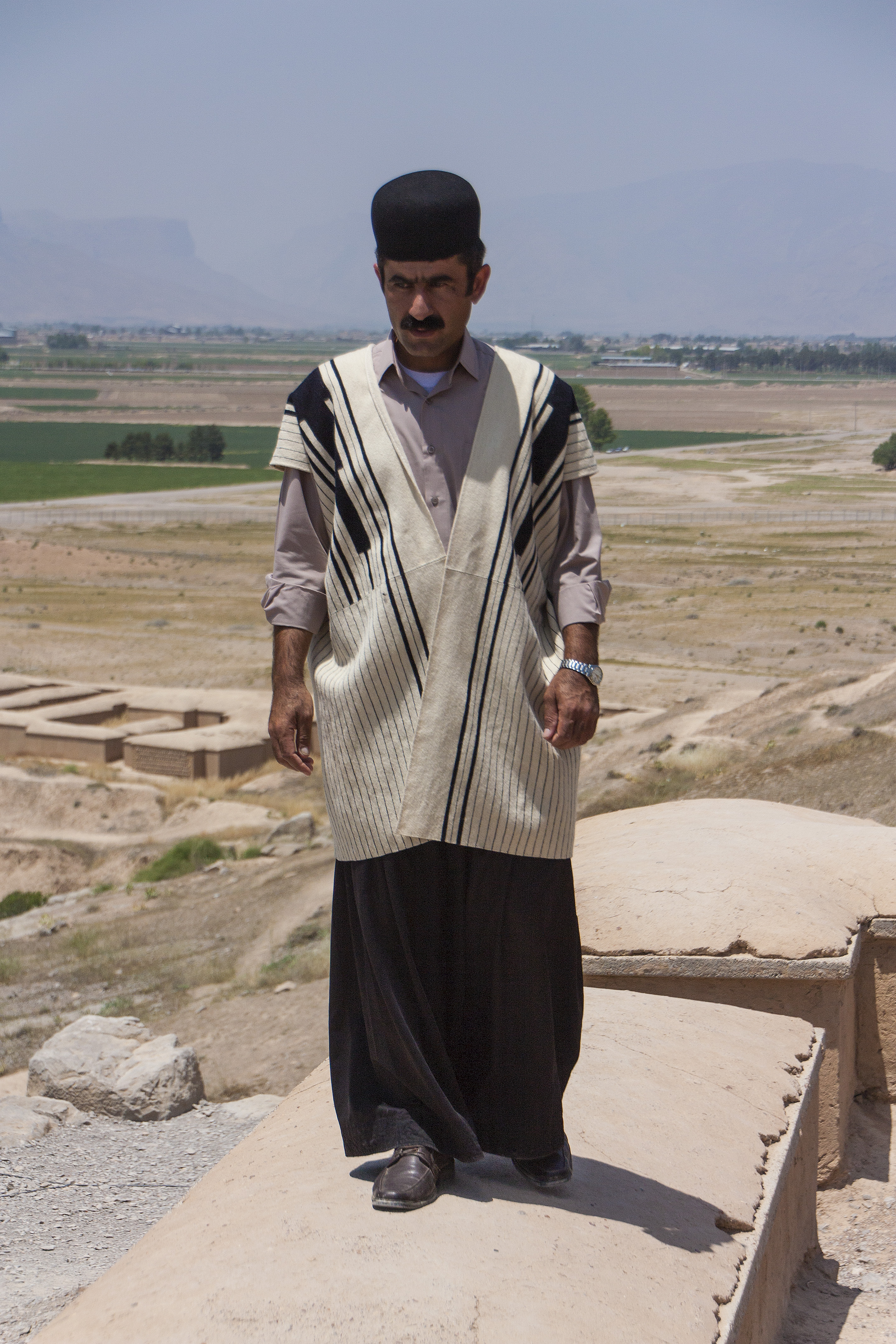
Traditional male costume of Bakhtiari Lurs

Chugha (چوغا): A masculine wrapper that is used prominently by Bakhtiari Lurs. Chugha is made by sheep wool and usually is woven by Bakhtiari nomads.

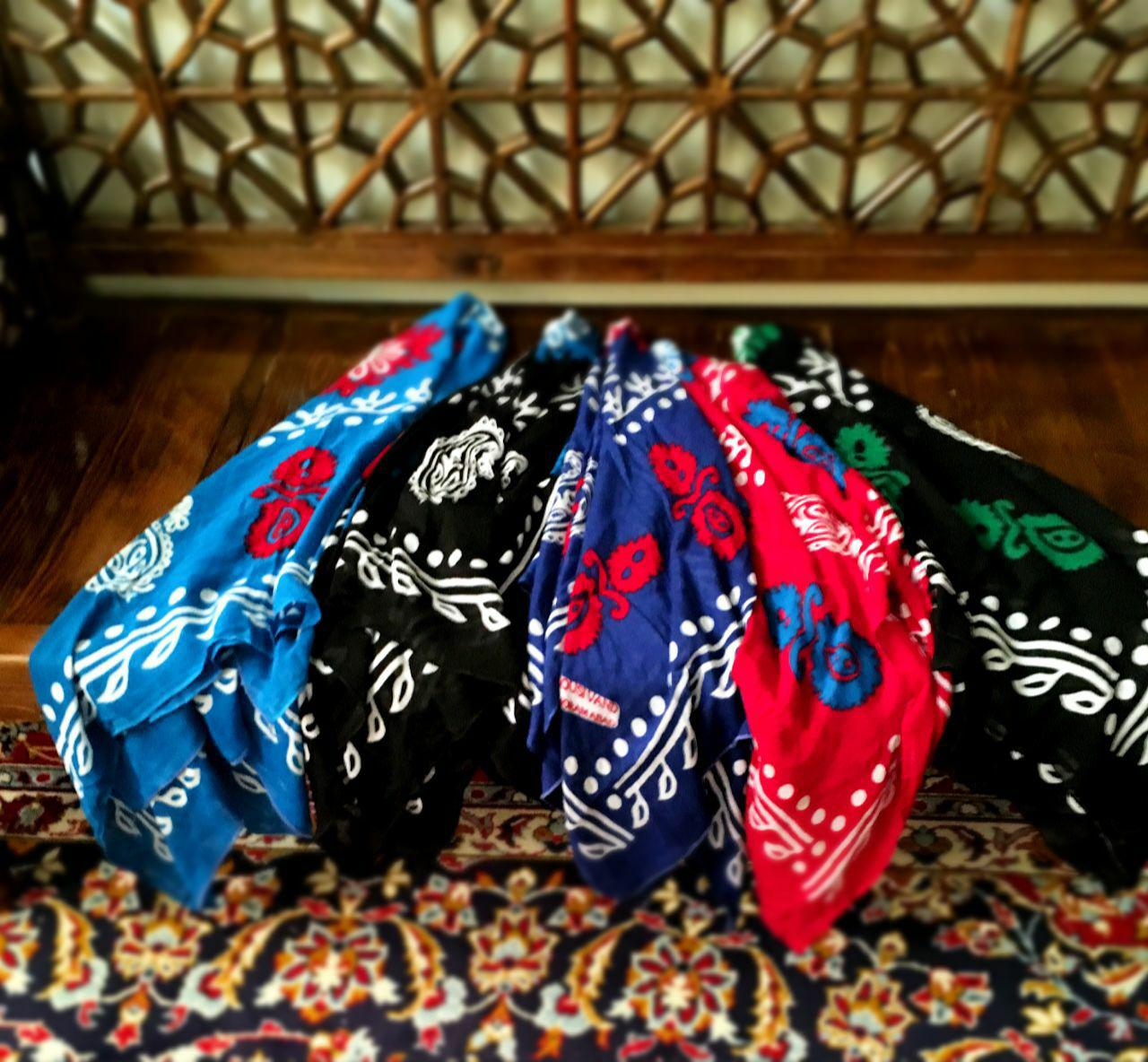
Golvani
