= Erik John Anonby =

Canadian linguist and academic (born 1975)

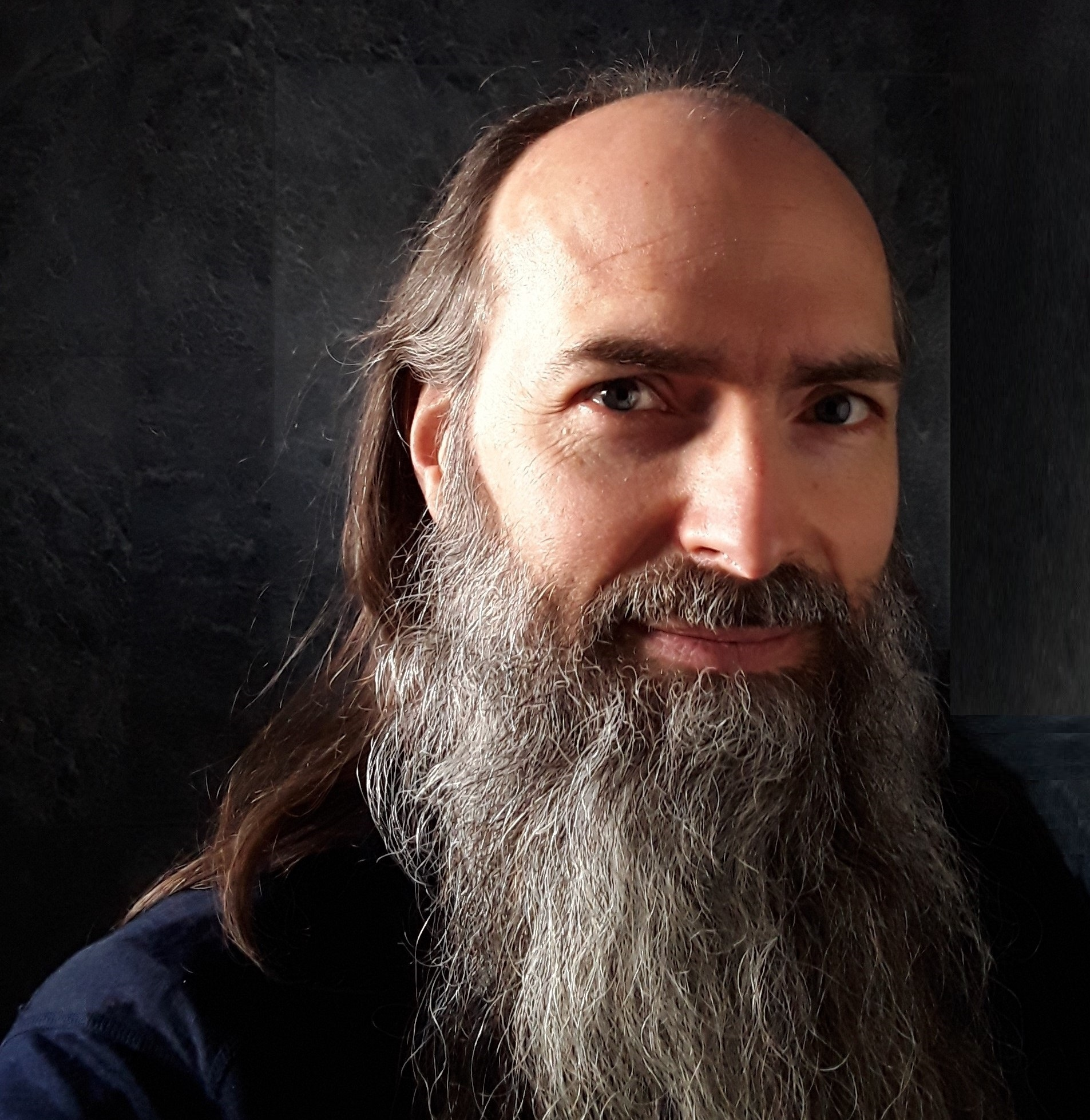
- Born: Erik John Anonby; 14 January 1975 (age 51); Winnipeg, Canada
- Occupations: Linguist, Carleton University, Leiden University Centre for Linguistics, University of Bamberg
- Notable work: Phonology, Language documentation, Language mapping, Critical cartography, Iranic (Iranian) languages, Semitic languages, Niger–Congo languages, Turkic languages

Erik John Anonby (born 1975) is a Canadian linguist and professor at Carleton University. Along with his role as editor-in-chief of the Atlas of the Languages of Iran (ALI), he is author of a number of books. He has published in journals such as Science, Linguistics, Iranian Studies, Journal of Semitic Studies, Journal of the International Phonetic Association, Journal of Linguistic Geography, and Journal of Ethnobiology.

Anonby is known for the development of the multi-dimensional model of language classification. In this model, relationships between languages are explicitly distinguished as genealogical (genetic), structural/typological, and social, and brought together in a composite relational web. Along with Adam Stone, he also developed the Evaluative Language Mapping Typology (ELM-T), a tool for analyzing and constructing language maps.

Anonby is a Humboldtian, having received the Alexander von Humboldt Foundation’s Fellowship for Experienced Researchers in 2016. In 2021, he was elected to the Royal Society of Canada’s College of New Scholars, Artists and Scientists.

== Publications ==
=== Books ===
- Update on Southern Luri: How Many Languages? (2002)
- A Phonology of Southern Luri (2003)
- Adaptive Multilinguals: A Survey of Language on Larak Island (2011)
- A Grammar of Mambay, an Adamawa Language of Chad and Cameroon (2011)
- Bakhtiari Studies: Phonology, Text, Lexicon (2014)
- Mambay–French Dictionary, Accompanied by a Spelling Guide and a Grammatical Outline (2014)
- Koroshi: a Corpus-based Grammatical Description (2015)
- Bakhtiari Studies II: Orthography (2018)

=== Relevant Journal Articles ===
- Bāhendayal: Bird Classification in Southern Luri (2006)
- On Language Distribution in Ilam Province, Iran (2014)
- The Atlas of the Languages of Iran (ALI): A Research Overview (2019)
- Emphatic Consonants Beyond Arabic: The Emergence and Proliferation of Uvular-Pharyngeal Emphasis in Kumzari (2020)
- Toward a Picture of Chahar Mahal va Bakhtiari Province, Iran, as a Linguistic Area (2021)
- A First Description of Arabic on the South Coast of Iran: The Arabic Dialect of Bandar Moqām, Hormozgan (2021)
- Language Trees with Sampled Ancestors Support a Hybrid Origin of the Indo-European Language Family (2023)
- Two Raji dialects Converge with Persian: Contrasting Responses to Contact Influence (2023)
