= Bakhtiari dialect =

Southern Luri dialect of Iran

Bakhtiari
- Bakhtiâri
- بختیاری
- Native to: Iran
- Ethnicity: Bakhtiari Lurs
- Native speakers: 1.27 million (2021)
- Language family: Indo-European: Indo-Iranian; Iranian; Western Iranian; Southwestern Iranian; Luri–Dezfuli?; Luri; Bakhtiari
- Dialects: Izeh; Shahr e Kord; Chaharlang; Haftgel; Aligudarz; Chelgerd; Kuhrang; Haftlang; Masjed e Soleiman
- Writing system: Persian alphabet

Language codes
- ISO 639-3: bqi
- Glottolog: bakh1245

Bakhtiari dialect is a dialect of the Luri language spoken by Bakhtiari people in Chaharmahal-o-Bakhtiari, Bushehr, eastern Khuzestan and parts of Isfahan and Lorestan provinces. It is closely related to the Boir-Ahamadi, Kohgiluyeh, and Mamasani dialects in northwestern Fars. These dialects, together with the Luri dialects of Lorestan (e.g. Khorramabadi dialect), are referred to as the "Perside" southern Zagros group, or Lori dialects. Luri and Bakhtiari are much more closely related to Persian than Kurdish. Dialects of Persian spoken in Chaharmahal and Bakhtiari province are mutually intelligible with Bakhtiari.

A Bakhtiâri dialect speaker
