= Luri language =

Southwestern Iranian languages of the Zagros Mountains

Luri
- لری
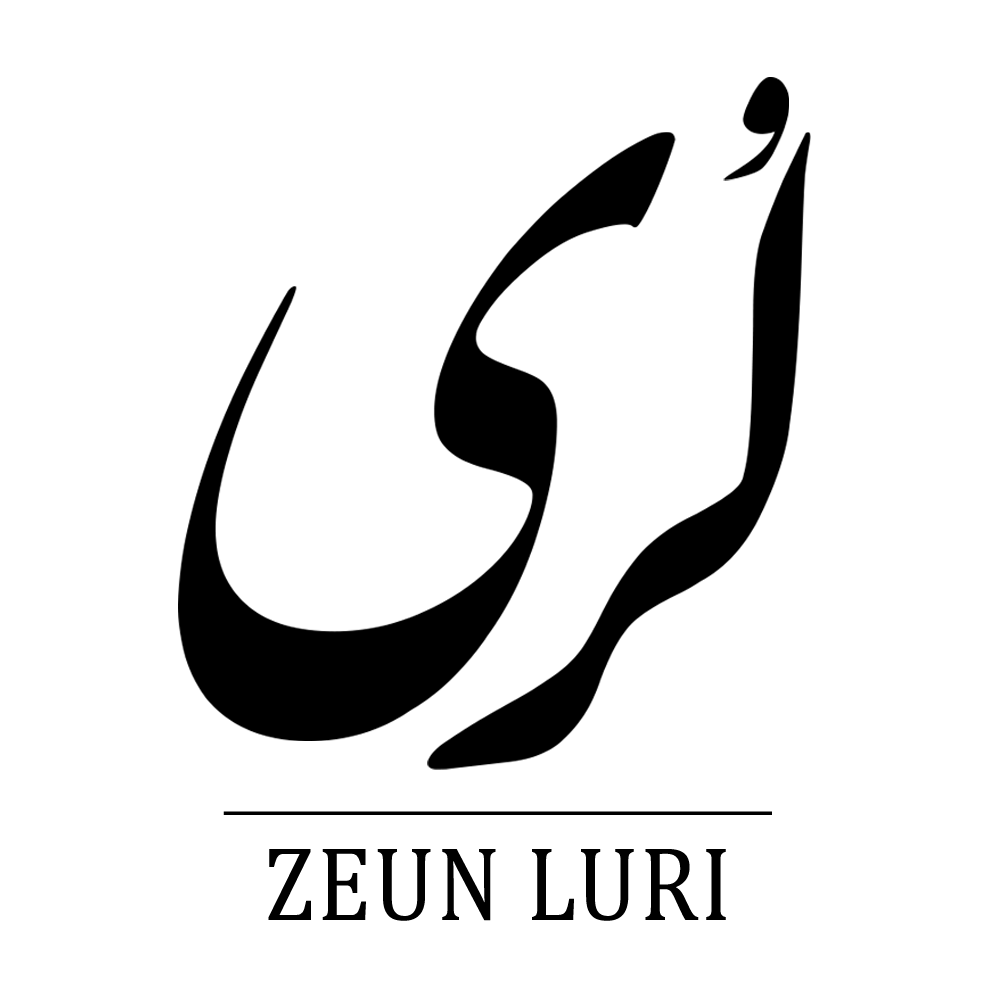
- "Luri" written in both Northern Luri and Southern Luri in the Perso-Arabic script with the Nastaliq font
- Pronunciation: Southern Luri pronunciation: [loriː]
- Native to: Iran; a few villages in eastern Iraq
- Region: Southern Zagros Mountains
- Ethnicity: Lurs
- Native speakers: 4–5 million (2012) 1.3 million (2007)
- Language family: Indo-European: Indo-Iranian; Iranian; Western Iranian; Southwestern Iranian; Luri–Dezfuli?; Luri
- Early forms: Old Persian: Middle Persian
- Dialects: Central Luri (Minjai); Bakhtiari; Southern Luri
- Writing system: Persian alphabet

Language codes
- ISO 639-3: Variously: lrc – Northern Luri bqi – Bakhtiari luz – Southern Luri
- Glottolog: luri1252

Luri (لری) is a Southwestern Iranian language, existing as a dialect continuum, spoken by the Lur people in the Zagros Mountains of Iran. The Luri dialects are descended from Middle Persian and are Central Luri, Bakhtiari, and Southern Luri. This language is spoken mainly by the Bakhtiari and the Northern and Southern Lurs (Lorestan, Ilam, Kohgiluyeh and Boyer-Ahmad, Mamasani, Sepidan, Bandar Ganaveh, Bandar Deylam) in Iran.

== History ==
The Encyclopedia of Islam calls Luri “an aberrant form of archaic Persian.” The language descends from either Middle Persian or Old Persian. It belongs to the “Perside southern Zagros group” (as opposed to Kurdish dialects of northern Zagros), and is lexically similar to modern Persian, differing mainly in phonology.

According to the Encyclopædia Iranica, "All Lori dialects closely resemble standard Persian and probably developed from a stage of Persian similar to that represented in Early New Persian texts written in Perso-Arabic script. The sole typical Lori feature not known in early New Persian or derivable from it is the inchoative marker (see below), though even this is found in Judeo-Persian texts". The Bakhtiāri dialect may be closer to Persian. There are two distinct languages, Greater Luri (Lor-e bozorg), a.k.a. Southern Luri (including Bakhtiari dialect), and Lesser Luri (Lor-e kuček), a.k.a. Northern Luri.

Anonby stated that Luri was not a single language but a Southwestern Iranian language continuum consisting of the Luristani, Bakhtiari, and Southern Luri languages, and itself was a language continuum between Kurdish and Persian. Anonby stated that the differences in the Luri dialects were big enough for them to be considered different languages. MacKinnon also claimed that the Luri dialects had different origins and also claimed Shushtari and Dezfuli as languages of the Luri family despite them traditionally being considered Persian. Some linguists came to the idea that the only reason Dezfuli and Shushtari were often considered Persian dialects was that there were no Luri tribes named Dezfuli and Shushtari, and that the structure of the Luri language was based particularly on tribal divisions rather than linguistic facts. They added that since the term Lur was originally regional, "Luri" was actually a demonym, and that outsiders referred to all languages of the region as Luri, unaware of its linguistic diversity. Furthermore, there was no evidence of a common proto-Lur dialect, with the shared features of the Luri dialects probably having developed separately although along parallel lines.

The first major documentation of the Luri language was carried out by the Russian scholar, V. A. Zhukovski in 1883, where he transcribed 992 Bakhtiari couplets. However, he did not say the genealogical classification of Bakhtiari. After Zhukovski, the German linguist Oskar Mann published "Die Mundarten der Lur-stämme" in 1910, where he studied the Luri language and was the first linguist to claim that Luri, which was then thought to be a dialect of Kurdish, was a distinct language.

== Geography ==
=== Northern Luri ===
Luri dialects (Northern Luri [or Central Luri], Shuhani and Hinimini) are as a group the second largest language in the Lorestan province (around 25% of the population), mainly spoken in the eastern counties of the province (Khoramabad, Dorud, Borujerd). In the Ilam province (around 14.59% of the population) it is mostly spoken in villages in the southern parts of the province. Around 21.24% of Hamadan province speak Northern Luri.

=== Southern Luri ===
Southern Luri is a dialect of Luri is spoken by Southern Lurs and Lurs people mainly in Kohgiluyeh and Boyer-Ahmad province, northwest Fars province, east Khuzestan province and some in Bushehr province.

=== Bakhtiari ===
The Bakhtiari dialect is the main first language in the province of Chaharmahal and Bakhtiari (around 61.82%), except around Shahrekord, Borujen, Ben and Saman counties, where Persian, Turkic and Chaharmahali dialect predominate. Around 7.15% of Isfahan province speak Bakhtiari.

=== Statistics ===
Province	Luri-speakers	%	Note
Chaharmahal and Bakhtiari	520,000	61.82%	Bakhtiyari dialect
Gilan	2,600	0.25%	
Hamadan	370,000	21.24%	Northern Luri
Ilam	78,300	14.59%	Hinimini, Shuhani and Northern Luri
Isfahan	350,000	7.15%	Bakhtiyari dialect
Kohgiluyeh and Boyer-Ahmad	510,000	71.54%	Southern Lori
Lorestan	450,000	25.5%	Northern Lori

== Internal classification ==
The language consists of Central Luri, Bakhtiari, and Southern Luri. Central Luri is spoken in northern parts of Luri communities including eastern, central and northern parts of Luristan province, southern parts of Hamadan province mainly in Malayer, Nahavand and Tuyserkan counties, southern regions of Ilam province and southeastern parts of Markazi province. Bakhtiari is used by Bakhtiari people in South Luristan, Chaharmahal and Bakhtiari province, significant regions in north and east of Khouzestan and western regions of Isfahan province. Finally, Southern Luri is spoken throughout Kohgiluyeh and Boyer-Ahmad province, and in western and central regions in Fars province, northern and western parts of Bushehr province and southeastern regions of Khouzestan. Several Luri communities are spread sporadically across the Iranian Plateau e.g. Khorasan (Beyranvand and Bakhtiari Luri descendants), Kerman, Guilan and Tehran provinces. Luri is not only spoken by Lurs, as the ethnic Persians in the Nahavand region spoke northern Luri as their native language, and while the dialects of Shushtar, Dezful, and Shahr-e-Kord were closer to Luri, the speakers identified as ethnic Persians.

== Phonology ==
=== Vowels ===
	Front	Back
Close	iː	uː
Close	ɪ	ʊ
Mid	ɛ	ɔ
Open	a~æ^{1}	ɑː

1. /a/ may also range to a higher /æ/ in the Northern dialect.
- Vowels /ɛ, ɔ/ may also be realized as more close [e, o] within diphthongs or before glide sounds.
- /ɛ, ɔ/ can also be heard as higher [ɛ̝, ɔ̝] in Southern Luri.
- /a/ can also be raised as [ə] or [ɛ] before semivowels.

=== Consonants ===
		Labial	Dental/ Alveolar	Palato- alveolar	Palatal	Velar	Uvular	Glottal
Stop/ Affricate	voiceless	p	t	t͡ʃ		k	q	ʔ^{4}
Stop/ Affricate	voiced	b	d	d͡ʒ		ɡ	ɢ	
Fricative	voiceless	f	s	ʃ		x^{2}	χ	h
Fricative	voiced	(v)	z	ʒ		ɣ^{2}	ʁ^{3}	
Nasal		m	n		ɲ^{1}			
Tap/Trill			ɾ^{5}					
Approximant		ʋ	l		j	(w)		

1. /ɲ/ occurs in Northern Luri.
2. Velar fricatives /x, ɣ/ as equivalent to uvular fricatives /χ, ʁ/, occur in Northern Luri.
3. /ʁ/ occurs in Southern Luri.
4. /ʔ/ occurs in Northern Luri, as well as in words borrowed from Persian.
5. /ɾ/ can also be heard as a trill [r] in Southern Luri.
- /h/ also occurs as a glide to elongate short vowels (e.g. /oh/; [ɔː]).
- [v, w] occur as allophones of a labiodental approximant /ʋ/.

== Vocabulary ==
In comparison with other Iranian languages, Luri has been less affected by foreign languages such as Arabic and Turkic. Nowadays, many ancient Iranian language characteristics are preserved and can be observed in Luri grammar and vocabulary. According to diverse regional and socio-ecological conditions and due to longtime social interrelations with adjacent ethnic groups especially Kurds and Persians, different dialects of Luri, despite mainly common characteristics, have significant differences. The northern dialect tends to have more Kurdish loanwords inside and southern dialects (Bakhtiari and Southern Luri) have been more exposed to Persian loanwords.

== See also ==
- Bakhtiari dialect
- Borujerdi dialect
- Dialects of Fars
