= Zaviyeh (disambiguation) =

Zaviyeh is a city in Markazi Province, Iran.

Zaviyeh or Zaveyeh or Zavieh (Persian: زاويه) may also refer to:

== Ardabil Province ==
- Zaviyeh Qeshlaq, Ardabil Province
- Zaviyeh Sang, Ardabil Province
- Zaviyeh-ye Jafarabad, Ardabil Province
- Zaviyeh-ye Kivi, Ardabil Province
- Zaviyeh-ye Kord, Ardabil Province
- Zaviyeh-ye Sadat, Ardabil Province
- Zaviyeh-ye Zarjabad, Ardabil Province

== East Azerbaijan Province ==
- Zaviyeh, Ajab Shir, a village in Ajab Shir County
- Zaviyeh, Hashtrud, a village in Hashtrud County
- Zaviyeh, Jolfa, a village in Jolfa County
- Zaviyeh, Kaleybar, a village in Kaleybar County
- Zaviyeh, Meyaneh, a village in Meyaneh County

== Khuzestan Province ==
- Zaviyeh Hajjian, Khuzestan Province, Iran
- Zaviyeh Hamudi, Khuzestan Province, Iran
- Zaviyeh Khersan, Khuzestan Province, Iran
- Zaviyeh Mashali, Khuzestan Province, Iran
- Zaviyeh Moradi, Khuzestan Province, Iran

== West Azerbaijan Province ==
- Zaviyeh-ye Olya, a village in Chaldoran County
- Zaviyeh-ye Sofla, a village in Chaldoran County
- Zaviyeh, West Azerbaijan, a village in Khoy County
- Zaviyeh-e Hasan Khan, a village in Khoy County
- Zaviyeh-e Sheykh Lar, a village in Khoy County

== See also ==
- Zeyva, Iran (disambiguation)
