= Shahrak-e Shamsabad =

Shahrak-e Shamsabad شهرك شمس اباد
- Village
- Location within Iran
- Coordinates: 32°17′36″N 48°26′47″E
- Country: Iran
- Province: Khuzestan
- County: Dezful
- Bakhsh: Central
- Rural District: Shamsabad

Population (2006)
  - Total: 2,863
- Time zone: UTC+3:30 (IRST)
  - Summer (DST): UTC+4:30 (IRDT)

Shahrak-e Shamsabad (Persian: شهرك شمس اباد, also Romanized as Shahrak-e Shamsābād) is a village in Shamsabad Rural District, in the Central District of Dezful County, Khuzestan Province, Iran. At the 2006 census, its population was 2,863, in 529 families.
