= Shahrak-e Ayatollah Motahhari =

Shahrak-e Ayatollah Motahhari شهرك ايت اله مطهري
- Village
- Location within Iran
- Coordinates: 32°15′01″N 48°22′19″E
- Country: Iran
- Province: Khuzestan
- County: Dezful
- Bakhsh: Central
- Rural District: Qeblehi

Population (2006)
  - Total: 762
- Time zone: UTC+3:30 (IRST)
  - Summer (DST): UTC+4:30 (IRDT)

Shahrak-e Ayatollah Motahhari (Persian: شهرك ايت اله مطهري, also Romanized as Shahrak-e Āyatollāh Moţahharī; also known as Kovīkh, Qal‘eh-ye Rob Kovīkh, and Shahrak-e Moţahharī) is a village in Qeblehi Rural District, in the Central District of Dezful County, Khuzestan Province, Iran. At the 2006 census, its population was 762, in 166 families.
