= Jateh =

Jateh جاته
- Village
- Location within Iran
- Coordinates: 32°22′28″N 48°20′55″E
- Country: Iran
- Province: Khuzestan
- County: Dezful
- Bakhsh: Central
- Rural District: Qeblehi

Population (2006)
  - Total: 1,227
- Time zone: UTC+3:30 (IRST)
  - Summer (DST): UTC+4:30 (IRDT)

Jateh (Persian: جاته, also Romanized as Jāteh) is a village in Qeblehi Rural District, in the Central District of Dezful County, Khuzestan Province, Iran. At the 2006 census, its population was 1,227, in 250 families.
