= Hajj Abdeh Mohammad =

Hajj Abdeh Mohammad حاج عبده محمد
- Village
- Country: Iran
- Province: Khuzestan
- County: Dezful
- Bakhsh: Central
- Rural District: Shamsabad

Population (2006)
  - Total: 560
- Time zone: UTC+3:30 (IRST)
  - Summer (DST): UTC+4:30 (IRDT)

Hajj Abdeh Mohammad (Persian: حاج عبده محمد, also Romanized as Ḩājj ʿAbdeh Moḩammad) is a village in Shamsabad Rural District, in the Central District of Dezful County, Khuzestan Province, Iran. At the 2006 census, its population was 560, in 126 families.
