= Khalteh =

Neighborhood in Khuzestan province, Iran

Khalteh Persian: خلطه
- Neighborhood
- Location within Iran
- Coordinates: 32°17′13″N 48°25′44″E
- Country: Iran
- Province: Khuzestan
- County: Dezful
- District: Central
- City: Shamsabad

Population (2011)
  - Total: 271
- Time zone: UTC+3:30 (IRST)

Khalteh (Persian: خلطه) (Note: Also romanized as Khalţeh, and Khelţeh; also known as Khalīfeh-ye Qadīm, Khalīteh, Khaltak, and Khalte) is a neighborhood in the city of Shamsabad in the Central District of Dezful County, Khuzestan province, Iran.

== Demographics ==
=== Population ===
At the time of the 2006 National Census, Khalteh's population was 320 in 79 households, when it was a village in Shamsabad Rural District. The following census in 2011 counted 271 people in 77 households.

After the census, the village of Shamsabad merged with the villages of Khalteh, Qaleh-ye Seyyed, and Shahrak-e Towhid to form the city of Shamsabad.
