= Shahrak-e Behruzi =

Shahrak-e Behruzi شهرك بهروزي
- Village
- Location within Iran
- Coordinates: 32°15′00″N 48°21′10″E
- Country: Iran
- Province: Khuzestan
- County: Dezful
- Bakhsh: Central
- Rural District: Qeblehi

Population (2006)
  - Total: 375
- Time zone: UTC+3:30 (IRST)
  - Summer (DST): UTC+4:30 (IRDT)

Shahrak-e Behruzi (Persian: شهرك بهروزي, also Romanized as Shahrak-e Behrūzī) is a village in Qeblehi Rural District, in the Central District of Dezful County, Khuzestan Province, Iran. At the 2006 census, its population was 375, in 67 families.
