= Shahrak-e Amir ol Momenin =

Shahrak-e Amir ol Momenin شهرك اميرالمومنين
- Village
- Location within Iran
- Coordinates: 32°10′11″N 48°25′14″E
- Country: Iran
- Province: Khuzestan
- County: Dezful
- Bakhsh: Central
- Rural District: Shamsabad

Population (2006)
  - Total: 988
- Time zone: UTC+3:30 (IRST)
  - Summer (DST): UTC+4:30 (IRDT)

Shahrak-e Amir ol Momenin (Persian: شهرك اميرالمومنين, also Romanized as Shahrak-e Amīr ol Mo'menīn; also known as ‘Abāreh) is a village in Shamsabad Rural District, in the Central District of Dezful County, Khuzestan Province, Iran. At the 2006 census, its population was 988, in 149 families.
