= Shahrak-e Mohajeran =

Shahrak-e Mohajeran شهرك مهاجرين
- Village
- Location within Iran
- Coordinates: 32°21′00″N 48°27′38″E
- Country: Iran
- Province: Khuzestan
- County: Dezful
- Bakhsh: Central
- Rural District: Shamsabad

Population (2006)
  - Total: 3,774
- Time zone: UTC+3:30 (IRST)
  - Summer (DST): UTC+4:30 (IRDT)

Shahrak-e Mohajeran (Persian: شهرك مهاجرين, also Romanized as Shahrak-e Mohājerān and Shahrak-e Mohājerīn) is a village in Shamsabad Rural District, in the Central District of Dezful County, Khuzestan Province, Iran. At the 2006 census, its population was 3,774, in 731 families.
