= Qaleh-ye Seyyed, Dezful =

Neighborhood in Khuzestan province, Iran

Qaleh-ye Seyyed Persian: قلعه سيد
- Neighborhood
- Location within Iran
- Coordinates: 32°18′08″N 48°25′23″E
- Country: Iran
- Province: Khuzestan
- County: Dezful
- District: Central
- City: Shamsabad

Population (2011)
  - Total: 4,607
- Time zone: UTC+3:30 (IRST)

Qaleh-ye Seyyed (Persian: قلعه سيد) (Note: Also romanized as Qal‘eh-ye Seyyed; also known as Ghal‘eh Seyyed and Qal‘eh Saiyid) is a neighborhood in the city of Shamsabad in the Central District of Dezful County, Khuzestan province, Iran.

== Demographics ==
=== Population ===
At the time of the 2006 National Census, Qaleh-ye Seyyed's population was 4,091 in 913 households, when it was a village in Shamsabad Rural District. The following census in 2011 counted 4,607 people in 1,142 households.

After the census, the village of Shamsabad merged with the villages of Khalteh, Qaleh-ye Seyyed, and Shahrak-e Towhid to form the city of Shamsabad.
