= Shahrak-e Towhid =

Neighborhood in Khuzestan province, Iran

Shahrak-e Towhid Persian: شهرك توحيد
- Neighborhood
- Location within Iran
- Coordinates: 32°17′17″N 48°25′41″E
- Country: Iran
- Province: Khuzestan
- County: Dezful
- District: Central
- City: Shamsabad

Population (2011)
  - Total: 2,451
- Time zone: UTC+3:30 (IRST)

Shahrak-e Towhid (Persian: شهرك توحيد) (Note: Also romanized as Shahrak-e Towḩīd) is a neighborhood in the city of Shamsabad in the Central District of Dezful County, Khuzestan province, Iran.

== Demographics ==
=== Population ===
At the time of the 2006 National Census, Shahrak-e Towhid's population was 2,278 in 545 households, when it was a village in Shamsabad Rural District. The following census in 2011 counted 2,451 people in 641 households.

After the census, the village of Shamsabad merged with the villages of Khalteh, Qaleh-ye Seyyed, and Shahrak-e Towhid to form the city of Shamsabad.
