= Zaviyeh Moradi =

Zaviyeh Moradi زاويه مرادي
- Village
- Location within Iran
- Coordinates: 32°19′00″N 48°19′00″E
- Country: Iran
- Province: Khuzestan
- County: Dezful
- Bakhsh: Central
- Rural District: Qeblehi

Population (2006)
  - Total: 566
- Time zone: UTC+3:30 (IRST)
  - Summer (DST): UTC+4:30 (IRDT)

Zaviyeh Moradi (Persian: زاويه مرادي, also Romanized as Zāvīyeh Morādī and Zāveyeh Morādī) is a village in Qeblehi Rural District, in the Central District of Dezful County, Khuzestan Province, Iran. At the 2006 census, its population was 566, in 106 families.
