= Pay Kuh Mollah =

Pay Kuh Mollah پاي كوه ملاح
- Village
- Country: Iran
- Province: Khuzestan
- County: Dezful
- Bakhsh: Sardasht
- Rural District: Sardasht

Population (2006)
  - Total: 34
- Time zone: UTC+3:30 (IRST)
  - Summer (DST): UTC+4:30 (IRDT)

Pay Kuh Mollah (Persian: پاي كوه ملاح, also Romanized as Pāy Kūh Mollāḥ) is a village in Sardasht Rural District, Sardasht District, Dezful County, Khuzestan Province, Iran. At the 2006 census, its population was 34, in 8 families.
