= Shahrak-e Edalat =

Shahrak-e Edalat شهرك عدالت
- Village
- Location within Iran
- Coordinates: 32°16′09″N 48°29′01″E
- Country: Iran
- Province: Khuzestan
- County: Dezful
- Bakhsh: Central
- Rural District: Shamsabad

Population (2006)
  - Total: 3,434
- Time zone: UTC+3:30 (IRST)
  - Summer (DST): UTC+4:30 (IRDT)

Shahrak-e Edalat (Persian: شهرك عدالت, also Romanized as Shahrak-e ‘Edālat, meaning "City of Justice"; also known as Chaghā Sabz, Cheghā Sabz, Cheghā Sorkh, Choghā Sorkh, Choqā Sorkh, Chowgā Sorkh, Chowghā Sūrakī, and Chūgha Sūrkh) is a village in Shamsabad Rural District, in the Central District of Dezful County, Khuzestan Province, Iran. At the 2006 census, its population was 3,434, in 732 families. The name was changed to the present name after the Iranian revolution.
