= Gavmishabad-e Sharqi =

Koye Saheli کوی ساحلی
- Village
- Location within Iran
- Coordinates: 32°21′56″N 48°22′17″E
- Country: Iran
- Province: Khuzestan
- County: Dezful
- Bakhsh: Central
- Rural District: Qeblehi

Population (2006)
  - Total: 2,569
- Time zone: UTC+3:30 (IRST)
  - Summer (DST): UTC+4:30 (IRDT)

Koy Saheli , also Romanized as Gāvmīshābād-e Sharqī) is a village in Qeblehi Rural District, in the Central District of Dezful County, Khuzestan Province, Iran. At the 2006 census, its population was 2,569, in 496 families.
