= Dali Padiguleh =

Dali Padiguleh دلي پاديگوله
- Village
- Country: Iran
- Province: Khuzestan
- County: Dezful
- Bakhsh: Sardasht
- Rural District: Sardasht

Population (2006)
  - Total: 77
- Time zone: UTC+3:30 (IRST)
  - Summer (DST): UTC+4:30 (IRDT)

Dali Padiguleh (Persian: دلي پاديگوله, also Romanized as Dalī Pādīgūleh) is a village in Sardasht Rural District, Sardasht District, Dezful County, Khuzestan Province, Iran. At the 2006 census, its population was 77, in 20 families.
