= Shahrak-e Mohammad Ebn-e Jafar =

Village in Khuzestan province, Iran

Shahrak-e Mohammad Ebn-e Jafar Persian: شهرك محمدبن جعفر
- Village
- Location within Iran
- Coordinates: 32°19′07″N 48°21′48″E
- Country: Iran
- Province: Khuzestan
- County: Dezful
- District: Central
- Rural District: Qeblehi

Population (2016)
  - Total: 4,873
- Time zone: UTC+3:30 (IRST)

Shahrak-e Mohammad Ebn-e Jafar (Persian: شهرك محمدبن جعفر) (Note: Also romanized as Shahrak-e Moḩammad Ebn-e Ja‘far; also known as Shahrak-e Dez) is a village in, and the capital of, Qeblehi Rural District of the Central District of Dezful County, Khuzestan province, Iran.

== Demographics ==
=== Population ===
At the time of the 2006 National Census, the village's population was 4,148 in 912 households. The following census in 2011 counted 4,648 people in 1,122 households. The 2016 census measured the population of the village as 4,873 people in 1,317 households. It was the most populous village in its rural district.
