= Bandbal-e Bala =

Bandbal-e Bala بندبال بالا
- Village
- Location within Iran
- Coordinates: 32°20′37″N 48°23′14″E
- Country: Iran
- Province: Khuzestan
- County: Dezful
- Bakhsh: Central
- Rural District: Qeblehi

Population (2006)
  - Total: 430
- Time zone: UTC+3:30 (IRST)
  - Summer (DST): UTC+4:30 (IRDT)

Bandbal-e Bala (Persian: بندبال بالا, also Romanized as Bandbāl-e Bālā) is a village in Qeblehi Rural District, in the Central District of Dezful County, Khuzestan Province, Iran. According to the 2006 census, its population was 430, in 83 families.
