= Ahmadabad, Dezful =

Village in Khuzestan province, Iran

Ahmadabad Persian: احمداباد
- Village
- Country: Iran
- Province: Khuzestan
- County: Dezful
- District: Central
- Rural District: Shamsabad

Population (2016)
  - Total: 6,474
- Time zone: UTC+3:30 (IRST)

Ahmadabad (Persian: احمداباد) (Note: Also Romanized as Aḩmadābād) is a village in Shamsabad Rural District of the Central District of Dezful County, Khuzestan province, Iran.

== Demographics ==
=== Population ===
At the time of the 2006 National Census, the village's population was 4,221 in 806 households. The following census in 2011 counted 5,533 people in 1,176 households. The 2016 census measured the population of the village as 6,474 people in 1,600 households. It was the most populous village in its rural district.
