= Shahrak-e Enqelab, Khuzestan =

Shahrak-e Enqelab شهرك انقلاب
- Village
- Location within Iran
- Coordinates: 32°11′33″N 48°24′54″E
- Country: Iran
- Province: Khuzestan
- County: Dezful
- Bakhsh: Central
- Rural District: Shamsabad

Population (2006)
  - Total: 2,515
- Time zone: UTC+3:30 (IRST)
  - Summer (DST): UTC+4:30 (IRDT)

Shahrak-e Enqelab (Persian: شهرك انقلاب, also Romanized as Shahrak-e Enqelāb; also known as Ghal‘eh Abdolshah, Qal‘eh ‘Abdos̄h Shāh, and Qal‘eh-ye ‘Abd osh Shāh) is a village in Shamsabad Rural District, in the Central District of Dezful County, Khuzestan Province, Iran. At the 2006 census, its population was 2,515, in 493 families.
