= Bandbal-e Pain =

Bandbal-e Pain بندبال پايين
- Village
- Location within Iran
- Coordinates: 32°20′21″N 48°23′29″E
- Country: Iran
- Province: Khuzestan
- County: Dezful
- Bakhsh: Central
- Rural District: Qeblehi

Population (2006)
  - Total: 939
- Time zone: UTC+3:30 (IRST)
  - Summer (DST): UTC+4:30 (IRDT)

Bandbal-e Pain (Persian: بندبال پايين, also Romanized as Bandbāl-e Pā'īn) is a village in Qeblehi Rural District, in the Central District of Dezful County, Khuzestan Province, Iran. At the 2006 census, its population was 939, in 205 families.
