= Darzard =

Darzard دارزرد
- Village
- Location within Iran
- Coordinates: 32°37′06″N 48°57′08″E
- Country: Iran
- Province: Khuzestan
- County: Dezful
- Bakhsh: Sardasht
- Rural District: Sardasht

Population (2006)
  - Total: 21
- Time zone: UTC+3:30 (IRST)
  - Summer (DST): UTC+4:30 (IRDT)

Darzard (Persian: دارزرد, also Romanized as Dārzard) is a village in Sardasht Rural District, Sardasht District, Dezful County, Khuzestan Province, Iran. At the 2006 census, its population was 21, in 4 families.
