= Zeyva =

Zeyva or Dzeyva or Zeyvə may refer to:

== Places ==
Armenia

- Aratashen
- David Bek, Armenia
- Taronik

Azerbaijan

- Kələzeyvə
- Zeyvə, Davachi
- Zeyvə, Goranboy
- Zeyvə, Ismailli
- Zeyvə, Lachin
- Zeyvə, Nakhchivan

Iran

- Zaviyeh-ye Kord
- Zaviyeh-ye Sadat
- Zaviyeh, West Azerbaijan

== See also ==
- Zaviyeh (disambiguation)
