= Chogha Sorkh =

Chogha Sorkh چغاسرخ
- Village
- Location within Iran
- Coordinates: 32°16′00″N 48°28′00″E
- Country: Iran
- Province: Khuzestan
- County: Dezful
- Bakhsh: Central
- Rural District: Shamsabad

Population (2006)
  - Total: 825
- Time zone: UTC+3:30 (IRST)
  - Summer (DST): UTC+4:30 (IRDT)

Chogha Sorkh (Persian: چُغاسُرخ, also Romanized as Choghā Sorkh and Cheghā Sorkh; also known as Cheghā Sabz, Chogha Sabz, and Chūgha Sabz) is a village in Shamsabad Rural District, in the Central District of Dezful County, Khuzestan Province, Iran. At the 2006 census, its population was 825, in 177 families.
