= Abu ol Hasan =

Abu ol Hasan ابوالحسن
- Village
- Location within Iran
- Coordinates: 32°35′37″N 48°49′58″E
- Country: Iran
- Province: Khuzestan
- County: Dezful
- Bakhsh: Sardasht
- Rural District: Sardasht

Population (2006)
  - Total: 145
- Time zone: UTC+3:30 (IRST)
  - Summer (DST): UTC+4:30 (IRDT)

Abu ol Hasan (Persian: ابوالحسن, also Romanized as Abū ol Ḩasan) is a village in Sardasht Rural District, Sardasht District, Dezful County, Khuzestan Province, Iran. At the 2006 census, its population was 145, in 26 families.
