= Gavmishabad, Dezful =

Gavmishabad گاوميش آباد
- Village
- Location within Iran
- Coordinates: 32°22′41″N 48°22′00″E
- Country: Iran
- Province: Khuzestan
- County: Dezful
- Bakhsh: Central
- Rural District: Qeblehi

Population (2006)
  - Total: 78
- Time zone: UTC+3:30 (IRST)
  - Summer (DST): UTC+4:30 (IRDT)

Gavmishabad (Persian: گاوميش آباد, also Romanized as Gāvmīshābād; also known as Gāvmīshābād-e Gharbī) is a village in Qeblehi Rural District, in the Central District of Dezful County, Khuzestan Province, Iran. At the 2006 census, its population was 78, in 19 families.
