= Zavareh-ye Saland Kuh =

Zavareh-ye Saland Kuh زوره سالندكوه
- Village
- Country: Iran
- Province: Khuzestan
- County: Dezful
- Bakhsh: Sardasht
- Rural District: Sardasht

Population (2006)
  - Total: 82
- Time zone: UTC+3:30 (IRST)
  - Summer (DST): UTC+4:30 (IRDT)

Zavareh-ye Saland Kuh (Persian: زوره سالندكوه, also Romanized as Zavarah-ye Sāland Kūh) is a village in Sardasht Rural District, Sardasht District, Dezful County, Khuzestan Province, Iran. At the 2006 census, its population was 82, in 15 families.
