= Zaviyeh Mashali =

Zaviyeh Mashali زاويه مشعلي
- Village
- Location within Iran
- Coordinates: 32°18′58″N 48°19′04″E
- Country: Iran
- Province: Khuzestan
- County: Dezful
- Bakhsh: Central
- Rural District: Qeblehi

Population (2006)
  - Total: 836
- Time zone: UTC+3:30 (IRST)
  - Summer (DST): UTC+4:30 (IRDT)

Zaviyeh Mashali (Persian: زاويه مشعلي, also Romanized as Zāvīyeh Mash‘alī and Zāveyeh-ye Mash‘alī; also known as Mash‘alī) is a village in Qeblehi Rural District, in the Central District of Dezful County, Khuzestan Province, Iran. At the 2006 census, its population was 836, in 147 families.
