= Zaviyeh Khersan =

Zaviyeh Khersan زاويه خرسان
- Village
- Location within Iran
- Coordinates: 32°16′42″N 48°18′18″E
- Country: Iran
- Province: Khuzestan
- County: Dezful
- Bakhsh: Central
- Rural District: Qeblehi

Population (2006)
  - Total: 227
- Time zone: UTC+3:30 (IRST)
  - Summer (DST): UTC+4:30 (IRDT)

Zaviyeh Khersan (Persian: زاويه خرسان, also Romanized as Zāvīyeh Khersān and Zāveyeh Khersān) is a village in Qeblehi Rural District, in the Central District of Dezful County, Khuzestan Province, Iran. At the 2006 census, its population was 227, in 40 families.
