= Shuhan-e Sofla, Khuzestan =

Shuhan-e Sofla شوهان سفلي
- Village
- Location within Iran
- Coordinates: 32°19′45″N 48°18′13″E
- Country: Iran
- Province: Khuzestan
- County: Dezful
- Bakhsh: Central
- Rural District: Qeblehi

Population (2006)
  - Total: 406
- Time zone: UTC+3:30 (IRST)
  - Summer (DST): UTC+4:30 (IRDT)

Shuhan-e Sofla (Persian: شوهان سفلي, also Romanized as Shūhān-e Soflá; also known as Shāhūn-e Soflá, Shoohan, Shūhān, and Ţorfīān) is a village in Qeblehi Rural District, in the Central District of Dezful County, Khuzestan Province, Iran. At the 2006 census, its population was 406, in 70 families.
