= Shuhan-e Olya, Khuzestan =

Shuhan-e Olya شوهان عليا
- Village
- Location within Iran
- Coordinates: 32°20′27″N 48°18′21″E
- Country: Iran
- Province: Khuzestan
- County: Dezful
- Bakhsh: Central
- Rural District: Qeblehi

Population (2006)
  - Total: 594
- Time zone: UTC+3:30 (IRST)
  - Summer (DST): UTC+4:30 (IRDT)

Shuhan-e Olya (Persian: شوهان عليا, also Romanized as Shūhān-e ‘Olyā; also known as Shāhūn-e ‘Olyā) is a village in Qeblehi Rural District, in the Central District of Dezful County, Khuzestan Province, Iran. At the 2006 census, its population was 594, in 121 families.
