= Chambareh =

Chambareh چمبره
- Village
- Location within Iran
- Coordinates: 32°29′12″N 48°45′30″E
- Country: Iran
- Province: Khuzestan
- County: Dezful
- Bakhsh: Sardasht
- Rural District: Sardasht

Population (2006)
  - Total: 192
- Time zone: UTC+3:30 (IRST)
  - Summer (DST): UTC+4:30 (IRDT)

Chambareh (Persian: چمبره, also Romanized as Chamboreh) is a village in Sardasht Rural District, Sardasht District, Dezful County, Khuzestan Province, Iran. At the 2006 census, its population was 192, in 38 families.
