= Ispareh =

Ispareh ايسپره
- Village
- Country: Iran
- Province: Khuzestan
- County: Dezful
- Bakhsh: Sardasht
- Rural District: Sardasht

Population (2006)
  - Total: 431
- Time zone: UTC+3:30 (IRST)
  - Summer (DST): UTC+4:30 (IRDT)

Ispareh (Persian: ايسپره, also Romanized as Īspareh) is a village in Sardasht Rural District, Sardasht District, Dezful County, Khuzestan Province, Iran. At the 2006 census, its population was 431, in 75 families.
