= Lab Sefid-e Sofla =

Lab Sefid-e Sofla لب سفيدسفلي
- Village
- Location within Iran
- Coordinates: 32°33′44″N 48°48′38″E
- Country: Iran
- Province: Khuzestan
- County: Dezful
- Bakhsh: Sardasht
- Rural District: Sardasht

Population (2006)
  - Total: 43
- Time zone: UTC+3:30 (IRST)
  - Summer (DST): UTC+4:30 (IRDT)

Lab Sefid-e Sofla (Persian: لب سفيدسفلي, also Romanized as Lab Sefīd-e Soflá; also known as Lop Sefīd-e Soflá) is a village in Sardasht Rural District, Sardasht District, Dezful County, Khuzestan Province, Iran. At the 2006 census, its population was 43, in 8 families.
