= Gavmishabad =

Gavmishabad (Persian: گاوميش اباد) may refer to:

- Gavmishabad, Ahvaz
- Gavmishabad, Dezful
- Gavmishabad-e Sharqi, Dezful County
- Gavmishabad, Shushtar
