= Zaviyeh Hamudi =

Zaviyeh Hamudi زاويه حمودي
- Village
- Location within Iran
- Coordinates: 32°17′44″N 48°19′23″E
- Country: Iran
- Province: Khuzestan
- County: Dezful
- Bakhsh: Central
- Rural District: Qeblehi

Population (2006)
  - Total: 523
- Time zone: UTC+3:30 (IRST)
  - Summer (DST): UTC+4:30 (IRDT)

Zaviyeh Hamudi (Persian: زاويه حمودي, also Romanized as Zāvīyeh Ḩamūdī, Zavīyeh Hamoodī, and Zāveyeh-ye Ḩamūdī; also known as Hamūdī and Zavīyeh) is a village in Qeblehi Rural District, in the Central District of Dezful County, Khuzestan Province, Iran. At the 2006 census, its population was 523, in 107 families.
