= Hamudi =

Hamudi (Persian: حمودي) may refer to:

- Hamudi, Dasht-e Azadegan
- Hamudi, Dezful
- Hamudi, Shush
