= Lab Sefid =

Lab Sefid (Persian: لب سفيد), also rendered as Lop Sefid, may refer to:

- Lab Sefid-e Olya
- Lab Sefid-e Sofla
