= Shuhan =

Shuhan, shu han, or variation, may refer to:

== Iran ==
Shuhan (Persian: شوهان), also rendered as Shoohan or Shahun or Showhan, may refer to:

- Shuhan-e Olya (disambiguation)
- Shuhan-e Sofla (disambiguation)
- Shuhan Rural District, in Ilam Province

== Other uses ==
- Shu Han, (蜀漢) 221–263, one of the states during the Three Kingdoms period in China

== See also ==
- Han shu (disambiguation)
