= Tang Dez =

Tang Dez (Persian: تنگ دز) may refer to:

- Tang Dez-e Olya
- Tang Dez-e Sofla
