= Bandbal =

Bandbal (Persian: بندبال) may refer to:

- Bandbal-e Bala
- Bandbal-e Pain
