= Tang Dez-e Sofla =

Tang Dez-e Sofla تنگ دزسفلي
- Village
- Country: Iran
- Province: Khuzestan
- County: Dezful
- Bakhsh: Sardasht
- Rural District: Sardasht

Population (2006)
  - Total: 13
- Time zone: UTC+3:30 (IRST)
  - Summer (DST): UTC+4:30 (IRDT)

Tang Dez-e Sofla (Persian: تنگ دزسفلي, also Romanized as Tang Dez-e Soflá) is a village in Sardasht Rural District, Sardasht District, Dezful County, Khuzestan Province, Iran. At the 2006 census, its population was 13, in 4 families.
