= Gavmir, Khuzestan =

Village in Khuzestan province, Iran

Gavmir Persian: گاومير
- Village
- Location within Iran
- Coordinates: 32°29′16″N 48°40′28″E
- Country: Iran
- Province: Khuzestan
- County: Dezful
- District: Sardasht
- Rural District: Sardasht

Population (2016)
  - Total: 868
- Time zone: UTC+3:30 (IRST)

Gavmir (Persian: گاومير) (Note: Also romanized as Gāvmīr; also known as Gāmīr) is a village in Sardasht Rural District of Sardasht District, Dezful County, Khuzestan province, Iran.

== Demographics ==
=== Population ===
At the time of the 2006 National Census, the village's population was 959 in 160 households. The following census in 2011 counted 952 people in 207 households. The 2016 census measured the population of the village as 868 people in 199 households. It was the most populous village in its rural district.
