= Chogha Sabz =

Chogha Sabz (Persian: چغاسبز) may refer to:

- Chogha Sabz, Khuzestan
- Chogha Sabz, Lorestan
- Chpgha Sabz, alternate name of Shahrak-e Edalat, Khuzestan Province
