= Tang Dez-e Olya =

Tang Dez-e Olya تنگ دزعليا
- Village
- Country: Iran
- Province: Khuzestan
- County: Dezful
- Bakhsh: Sardasht
- Rural District: Sardasht

Population (2006)
  - Total: 36
- Time zone: UTC+3:30 (IRST)
  - Summer (DST): UTC+4:30 (IRDT)

Tang Dez-e Olya (Persian: تنگ دزعليا, also Romanized as Tang Dez-e ‘Olyā) is a village in Sardasht Rural District, Sardasht District, Dezful County, Khuzestan Province, Iran. At the 2006 census, its population was 36, in 6 families.
