= Siah Mansur, Khuzestan =

City in Khuzestan province, Iran

Siah Mansur Persian: سياه منصور
- City
- Location within Iran
- Coordinates: 32°19′53″N 48°29′44″E
- Country: Iran
- Province: Khuzestan
- County: Dezful
- District: Central

Population (2016)
  - Total: 5,406
- Time zone: UTC+3:30 (IRST)

Siah Mansur (Persian: سياه منصور) (Note: Also romanized as Sīāh Manşūr, Sīyah Mansoor, and Sīyah Mansūr) is a city in the Central District of Dezful County, Khuzestan province, Iran.

== Demographics ==
=== Population ===
At the time of the 2006 National Census, Siah Mansur's population was 4,556 in 922 households, when it was a village in Shamsabad Rural District. The following census in 2011 counted 4,803 people in 1,244 households. The 2016 census measured the population as 5,406 people in 1,415 households, by which time the village had been elevated to the status of a city.
