= Salandy =

Salandy is a surname. Notable people with the surname include:

- Giselle Salandy (1987–2009), Trinidadian professional boxer
- Marina Salandy-Brown, Trinidadian journalist, broadcaster, and cultural activist

== See also ==
- Saland (disambiguation)
