= Shuhan-e Olya =

Shuhan-e Olya or Showhan-e Olya (Persian: شوهان عليا) may refer to:

- Shuhan-e Olya, Kermanshah
- Shuhan-e Olya, Khuzestan
