= Montazeran =

City in Khuzestan province, Iran

Montazeran Persian: منتظران
- City
- Location within Iran
- Coordinates: 32°16′09″N 48°23′03″E
- Country: Iran
- Province: Khuzestan
- County: Dezful
- District: Central

Population (2016)
  - Total: 3,804
- Time zone: UTC+3:30 (IRST)

Montazeran (Persian: منتظران) (Note: Formerly the village of Shahrak-e Shahid Mohammad Montazeri (شهرك شهيد محمد منتظري), also romanized as Shahrak-e Shahīd Moḩammad Montaz̧erī; also known as Shahrak-e Āyatollāh Montaz̧erī) is a city in the Central District of Dezful County, Khuzestan province, Iran.

== Demographics ==
=== Population ===
At the time of the 2006 National Census, the population (as the village of Shahrak-e Shahid Mohammad Montazeri) was 3,599 in 787 households. The following census in 2011 counted 3,618 people in 936 households. The 2016 census measured the population of the city as 3,804 people in 1,203 households.

Shahrak-e Shahid Mohammad Montazeri was elevated to city status as Montazeran in 2019.
