= Shahrak-e Enqelab =

Shahrak-e Enqelab (Persian: شهرك انقلاب) may refer to:

- Shahrak-e Enqelab, Khuzestan
- Shahrak-e Enqelab, Tehran
