= Mianrud =

City in Khuzestan province, Iran

Mianrud Persian: ميانرود
- City
- Location within Iran
- Coordinates: 32°09′14″N 48°26′25″E
- Country: Iran
- Province: Khuzestan
- County: Dezful
- District: Central

Population (2016)
  - Total: 10,110
- Time zone: UTC+3:30 (IRST)

Mianrud (Persian: ميانرود) (Note: Also romanized as Meyānrūd and Mīānrūd; also known as Mianrudan (میانرودان), also romanized as Mīān Rūdān and Mīānrūdān) is a city in the Central District of Dezful County, Khuzestan province, Iran.

== Demographics ==
At the time of the 2006 National Census, the city's population was 9,199 in 1,888 households. The following census in 2011 counted 9,033 people in 2,078 households. The 2016 census measured the population of the city as 10,110 people in 2,847 households.
