= Shuhan-e Sofla =

Shuhan-e Sofla or Showhan-e Sofla (Persian: شوهان سفلي) may refer to:

- Shuhan-e Sofla, Kermanshah
- Shuhan-e Sofla, Khuzestan
