= Shamsabad, Dezful =

City in Khuzestan province, Iran

Shamsabad Persian: شمس اباد
- City
- Location within Iran
- Coordinates: 32°17′52″N 48°25′42″E
- Country: Iran
- Province: Khuzestan
- County: Dezful
- District: Central

Population (2016)
  - Total: 10,858
- Time zone: UTC+3:30 (IRST)

Shamsabad (Persian: شمس اباد) (Note: Also romanized as Shamsābād) is a city in the Central District of Dezful County, Khuzestan province, Iran, serving as the administrative center for Shamsabad Rural District.

== Demographics ==
=== Population ===
At the time of the 2006 National Census, Shamsabad's population was 2,934 in 708 households, when it was a village in Shamsabad Rural District. The following census in 2011 counted 2,832 people in 827 households. The 2016 census measured the population as 10,858 people in 3,164 households, by which time the village had merged with the villages of Khalteh, Qaleh-ye Seyyed, and Shahrak-e Towhid to form the city of Shamsabad.
