= Safiabad, Khuzestan =

City in Khuzestan province, Iran

Safiabad Persian: صفي آباد
- City
- Location within Iran
- Coordinates: 32°15′42″N 48°25′01″E
- Country: Iran
- Province: Khuzestan
- County: Dezful
- District: Central

Population (2016)
  - Total: 9,879
- Time zone: UTC+3:30 (IRST)

Safiabad (Persian: صفي آباد) (Note: Also romanized as Safi-Abad and Şafīābād; also known as Şafī Khānī) is a city in the Central District of Dezful County, Khuzestan province, Iran.

== Demographics ==
=== Population ===
At the time of the 2006 National Census, the city's population was 8,054 in 1,893 households. The following census in 2011 counted 9,046 people in 2,280 households. The 2016 census measured the population of the city as 9,879 people in 2,894 households.

== Climate ==
Climate data for Safiabad, Khuzestan (1991–2020)
Month	Jan	Feb	Mar	Apr	May	Jun	Jul	Aug	Sep	Oct	Nov	Dec	Year
Record high °C (°F)	24.5 (76.1)	29.2 (84.6)	39.2 (102.6)	42.2 (108.0)	48.2 (118.8)	51.0 (123.8)	51.8 (125.2)	51.4 (124.5)	48.4 (119.1)	43.2 (109.8)	34.0 (93.2)	29.6 (85.3)	51.8 (125.2)
Mean daily maximum °C (°F)	17.6 (63.7)	20.1 (68.2)	24.5 (76.1)	30.9 (87.6)	38.8 (101.8)	44.6 (112.3)	46.4 (115.5)	45.5 (113.9)	41.3 (106.3)	34.6 (94.3)	25.5 (77.9)	19.5 (67.1)	32.4 (90.3)
Daily mean °C (°F)	11.5 (52.7)	13.5 (56.3)	17.3 (63.1)	22.9 (73.2)	29.9 (85.8)	34.8 (94.6)	36.5 (97.7)	35.6 (96.1)	31.2 (88.2)	25.5 (77.9)	18.0 (64.4)	13.0 (55.4)	24.1 (75.4)
Mean daily minimum °C (°F)	6.5 (43.7)	7.7 (45.9)	10.7 (51.3)	15.3 (59.5)	20.3 (68.5)	23.7 (74.7)	26.3 (79.3)	25.9 (78.6)	21.9 (71.4)	17.7 (63.9)	12.2 (54.0)	8.0 (46.4)	16.4 (61.5)
Record low °C (°F)	−2.5 (27.5)	−3.0 (26.6)	1.0 (33.8)	3.6 (38.5)	10.0 (50.0)	16.0 (60.8)	15.6 (60.1)	18.6 (65.5)	13.4 (56.1)	8.4 (47.1)	1.0 (33.8)	−1.0 (30.2)	−3.0 (26.6)
Average precipitation mm (inches)	66.1 (2.60)	42.7 (1.68)	49.3 (1.94)	26.8 (1.06)	8.7 (0.34)	0.1 (0.00)	0.1 (0.00)	0.1 (0.00)	0.7 (0.03)	11.8 (0.46)	50.5 (1.99)	68.7 (2.70)	325.6 (12.82)
Average precipitation days (≥ 1.0 mm)	6.2	4.9	4.8	4.0	1.3	0.0	0.0	0.1	0.1	1.3	4.0	6.2	32.9
Average relative humidity (%)	77.0	69.0	64.0	54.0	35.0	25.0	26.0	32.0	38.0	48.0	65.0	77.0	50.8
Average dew point °C (°F)	7.3 (45.1)	7.4 (45.3)	9.7 (49.5)	12.2 (54.0)	10.6 (51.1)	9.7 (49.5)	12.4 (54.3)	14.8 (58.6)	13.9 (57.0)	12.6 (54.7)	10.7 (51.3)	8.7 (47.7)	10.8 (51.4)
Mean monthly sunshine hours	178.0	188.0	220.0	233.0	276.0	332.0	331.0	331.0	301.0	258.0	201.0	171.0	3,020
Source: NOAA

=== Record temperature ===
At 12:00 UTC (16:30 IRDT) on June 20, 2017, Safīābād reached a temperature of 46.5 °C (115.7 °F) with a dewpoint of −33.2 °C (−27.8 °F), for a relative humidity of 0.36%, the second lowest value ever recorded on Earth. Only Needles, California, United States has reported a lower humidity.
