= Hamzeh, Dezful =

City in Khuzestan province, Iran

Hamzeh Persian: حمزه
- City
- Location within Iran
- Coordinates: 32°23′33″N 48°34′42″E
- Country: Iran
- Province: Khuzestan
- County: Dezful
- District: Sardasht

Population (2016)
  - Total: 6,091
- Time zone: UTC+3:30 (IRST)

Hamzeh (Persian: حمزه) (Note: Formerly the village of Shahrak-e Hamzeh (شهرك حمزه), also romanized as Shahrak-e Ḩamzeh) is a city in Sardasht District of Dezful County, Khuzestan province, Iran.

== History ==
In 1980, with the beginning of the war between Iran and Iraq, some border residents from localities such as Rafi, Bostan, Hoveyzeh, Abadan and Khorramshahr were transferred to safe areas such as the village of Shahrak-e Hamzeh (now the city of Hamzeh). The city is 26 km from the city of Dezful.

== Demographics ==
=== Population ===
At the time of the 2006 National Census, the population (as the village of Shahrak-e Hamzeh) was 5,357 in 972 households, when it was in Mahur Berenji Rural District. The following census in 2011 counted 5,850 people in 1,217 households, by which time the village had been elevated to city status as Hamzeh. The 2016 census measured the population of the city as 6,091 people in 1,451 households.
