= Saland =

Saland may refer to:

- Saland, Iran, a city
- Stephanie Saland, American ballet dancer and teacher
- Stephen M. Saland, former New York state senator
- Saland, Switzerland, a village
