= Hamudi-ye Sadun =

Hamudi-ye Sadun حمودي سعدون
- Village
- Location within Iran
- Coordinates: 31°27′15″N 48°17′23″E
- Country: Iran
- Province: Khuzestan
- County: Dasht-e Azadegan
- Bakhsh: Central
- Rural District: Howmeh-ye Sharqi

Population (2006)
  - Total: 303
- Time zone: UTC+3:30 (IRST)
  - Summer (DST): UTC+4:30 (IRDT)

Hamudi-ye Sadun (Persian: حمودي سعدون, also romanized as Ḩamūdī-ye Sa‘dūn) is a village in Howmeh-ye Sharqi Rural District, in the Central District of Dasht-e Azadegan County, Khuzestan Province, Iran. At the 2006 census, its population was 303, in 54 families.
