= Shahr-e Emam =

City in Khuzestan province, Iran

Shahr-e Emam Persian: شهر امام
- City
- Location within Iran
- Coordinates: 32°13′36″N 48°25′38″E
- Country: Iran
- Province: Khuzestan
- County: Dezful
- District: Central

Population (2016)
  - Total: 11,393
- Time zone: UTC+3:30 (IRST)

Shahr-e Emam (Persian: شهر امام) (Note: Formerly Dezab (دزآب), also romanized as Dezāb) is a city in the Central District of Dezful County, Khuzestan province, Iran.

== Demographics ==
=== Population ===
At the time of the 2006 National Census, the city's population was 10,169 in 2,279 households. The following census in 2011 counted 10,836 people in 2,757 households. The 2016 census measured the population of the city as 11,393 people in 3,331 households.
