= Zaviyeh, Kaleybar =

Zaviyeh زاويه
- Village
- Location within Iran
- Coordinates: 38°51′00″N 47°01′00″E
- Country: Iran
- Province: East Azerbaijan
- County: Kaleybar
- Bakhsh: Central
- Rural District: Misheh Pareh

Population (2006)
  - Total: 63
- Time zone: UTC+3:30 (IRST)
  - Summer (DST): UTC+4:30 (IRDT)

Zaviyeh (Persian: زاويه, also Romanized as Zāvīyeh) is a village in Misheh Pareh Rural District, in the Central District of Kaleybar County, East Azerbaijan Province, Iran. At the 2006 census, its population was 63, in 11 families.
