= Zaviyeh, Ajab Shir =

Zaviyeh زاويه
- Village
- Location within Iran
- Coordinates: 37°30′11″N 46°02′46″E
- Country: Iran
- Province: East Azerbaijan
- County: Ajab Shir
- Bakhsh: Qaleh Chay
- Rural District: Dizajrud-e Sharqi

Population (2006)
  - Total: 299
- Time zone: UTC+3:30 (IRST)
  - Summer (DST): UTC+4:30 (IRDT)

Zaviyeh (Persian: زاويه, also Romanized as Zāvīyeh) is a village in Dizajrud-e Sharqi Rural District, Qaleh Chay District, Ajab Shir County, East Azerbaijan Province, Iran. At the 2006 census, its population was 299, in 68 families.
