= Saland, Iran =

City in Khuzestan province, Iran

Saland Persian: سالند
- City
- Location within Iran
- Coordinates: 32°29′54″N 48°50′06″E
- Country: Iran
- Province: Khuzestan
- County: Dezful
- District: Sardasht

Population (2016)
  - Total: 2,560
- Time zone: UTC+3:30 (IRST)

Saland (Persian: سالند) (Note: Luri: Sâland; formerly Sardasht (سر دشت); also romanized as Sar Dasht and Sar-ī-Dasht) is a city in, and the capital of, Sardasht District of Dezful County, Khuzestan province, Iran. It also serves as the administrative center for Sardasht Rural District.

== Demographics ==
=== Population ===
At the time of the 2006 National Census, the city's population was 1,841 in 394 households. The following census in 2011 counted 2,085 people in 514 households. The 2016 census measured the population of the city as 2,560 people in 697 households.
