= Zaviyeh, Hashtrud =

Zaviyeh زاويه
- Village
- Location within Iran
- Coordinates: 37°19′12″N 47°10′15″E
- Country: Iran
- Province: East Azerbaijan
- County: Hashtrud
- Bakhsh: Central
- Rural District: Charuymaq-e Shomalesharqi

Population (2006)
  - Total: 70
- Time zone: UTC+3:30 (IRST)
  - Summer (DST): UTC+4:30 (IRDT)

Zaviyeh (Persian: زاويه, also Romanized as Zāvīyeh and Zāveyeh) is a village in Charuymaq-e Shomalesharqi Rural District, in the Central District of Hashtrud County, East Azerbaijan Province, Iran. At the 2006 census, its population was 70, in 18 families.
