= Zaviyeh-ye Olya =

Zaviyeh-ye Olya زاويه عليا
- Village
- Location within Iran
- Coordinates: 39°07′46″N 44°19′08″E
- Country: Iran
- Province: West Azerbaijan
- County: Chaldoran
- Bakhsh: Central
- Rural District: Chaldoran-e Shomali

Population (2006)
  - Total: 143
- Time zone: UTC+3:30 (IRST)
  - Summer (DST): UTC+4:30 (IRDT)

Zaviyeh-ye Olya (Persian: زاويه عليا, also Romanized as Zāvīyeh-ye ‘Olyā, Zāvīeh-ye ‘Olyā, and Zaviyeh Olya; also known as Zāvīeh, Zāvīeh Yukari, and Zāvīyeh-ye Bālā) is a village in Chaldoran-e Shomali Rural District, in the Central District of Chaldoran County, West Azerbaijan Province, Iran. At the 2006 census, its population was 143, in 33 families.
