= Zaviyeh-e Sheykh Lar =

Zaviyeh-e Sheykh Lar زاويه شيخلر
- Village
- Location within Iran
- Coordinates: 38°22′49″N 44°47′42″E
- Country: Iran
- Province: West Azerbaijan
- County: Khoy
- Bakhsh: Central
- Rural District: Rahal

Population (2006)
  - Total: 569
- Time zone: UTC+3:30 (IRST)
  - Summer (DST): UTC+4:30 (IRDT)

Zaviyeh-e Sheykh Lar (Persian: زاويه شيخلر, also Romanized as Zāvīyeh-e Sheykh Lar) is a village in Rahal Rural District, in the Central District of Khoy County, West Azerbaijan Province, Iran. At the 2006 census, its population was 569, in 100 families.
