= Shuhan-e Olya, Kermanshah =

Shuhan-e Olya شوهان عليا
- Village
- Location within Iran
- Coordinates: 34°01′56″N 46°48′28″E
- Country: Iran
- Province: Kermanshah
- County: Eslamabad-e Gharb
- Bakhsh: Homeyl
- Rural District: Homeyl

Population (2006)
  - Total: 35
- Time zone: UTC+3:30 (IRST)
  - Summer (DST): UTC+4:30 (IRDT)

Shuhan-e Olya (Persian: شوهان عليا, also Romanized as Shūhān-e ‘Olyā and Showhān-e ‘Olyā) is a village in Homeyl Rural District, Homeyl District, Eslamabad-e Gharb County, Kermanshah Province, Iran. At the 2006 census, its population was 35, in 8 families.
