= Zaviyeh, Meyaneh =

Zaviyeh زاويه
- Village
- Location within Iran
- Coordinates: 37°30′48″N 47°42′39″E
- Country: Iran
- Province: East Azerbaijan
- County: Meyaneh
- Bakhsh: Central
- Rural District: Qaflankuh-e Gharbi

Population (2006)
  - Total: 233
- Time zone: UTC+3:30 (IRST)
  - Summer (DST): UTC+4:30 (IRDT)

Zaviyeh (Persian: زاويه, also Romanized as Zāvīyeh) is a village in Qaflankuh-e Gharbi Rural District, in the Central District of Meyaneh County, East Azerbaijan Province, Iran. At the 2006 census, its population was 233, in 56 families.
