= Zaviyeh-ye Kord =

Village in Ardabil province, Iran

Zaviyeh-ye Kord Persian: زاويه كرد
- Village
- Location within Iran
- Coordinates: 37°50′54″N 48°23′07″E
- Country: Iran
- Province: Ardabil
- County: Kowsar
- District: Central
- Rural District: Sanjabad-e Shomali

Population (2016)
  - Total: 315
- Time zone: UTC+3:30 (IRST)

Zaviyeh-ye Kord (Persian: زاويه كرد) (Note: Also romanized as Zāvīeh Kord, Zāvīeh-ye Kord, and Zāvīyeh-ye Kord; also known as Zeīwa and Zeyva) is a village in Sanjabad-e Shomali Rural District of the Central District in Kowsar County, Ardabil province, Iran.

== Demographics ==
=== Population ===
At the time of the 2006 National Census, the village's population was 379 in 81 households. The following census in 2011 counted 342 people in 85 households. The 2016 census measured the population of the village as 379 people in 81 households.
