= Zaviyeh-ye Sadat =

Village in Ardabil province, Iran

Zaviyeh-ye Sadat Persian: زاويه سادات
- Village
- Location within Iran
- Coordinates: 37°34′28″N 48°31′41″E
- Country: Iran
- Province: Ardabil
- County: Khalkhal
- District: Central
- Rural District: Khanandabil-e Sharqi

Population (2016)
  - Total: 246
- Time zone: UTC+3:30 (IRST)

Zaviyeh-ye Sadat (Persian: زاويه سادات) (Note: Also romanized as Zāvīeh Sādāt and Zāvīyeh-ye Sādāt; also known as Zeīwa and Zeyva) is a village in Khanandabil-e Sharqi Rural District of the Central District in Khalkhal County, Ardabil province, Iran.

== Demographics ==
=== Population ===
At the time of the 2006 National Census, the village's population was 300 in 76 households. The following census in 2011 counted 280 people in 86 households. The 2016 census measured the population of the village as 246 people in 80 households.
