= Shamsabad Rural District (Dezful County) =

Rural district in Khuzestan province, Iran

Shamsabad Rural District Persian: دهستان شمس آباد
- Rural District
- Location within Iran
- Coordinates: 32°13′17″N 48°26′21″E
- Country: Iran
- Province: Khuzestan
- County: Dezful
- District: Central
- Capital: Shamsabad

Population (2016)
  - Total: 29,790
- Time zone: UTC+3:30 (IRST)

Shamsabad Rural District (Persian: دهستان شمس آباد) is in the Central District of Dezful County, Khuzestan province, Iran. It is administered from the city of Shamsabad.

== Demographics ==
=== Population ===
At the time of the 2006 National Census, the rural district's population was 40,207 in 8,283 households. There were 42,803 inhabitants in 10,322 households at the following census of 2011. The 2016 census measured the population of the rural district as 29,790 in 7,609 households. The most populous of its 48 villages was Ahmadabad, with 6,474 people.
