= Qeblehi Rural District =

Rural district in Khuzestan province, Iran

Qeblehi Rural District Persian: دهستان قبله‌ای
- Rural District
- Location within Iran
- Coordinates: 32°18′15″N 48°21′02″E
- Country: Iran
- Province: Khuzestan
- County: Dezful
- District: Central
- Capital: Shahrak-e Mohammad Ebn-e Jafar

Population (2016)
  - Total: 28,353
- Time zone: UTC+3:30 (IRST)

Qeblehi Rural District (Persian: دهستان قبله‌ای) is in the Central District of Dezful County, Khuzestan province, Iran. Its capital is the village of Shahrak-e Mohammad Ebn-e Jafar.

== Demographics ==
=== Population ===
At the time of the 2006 National Census, the rural district's population was 25,108 in 5,121 households. There were 27,163 inhabitants in 6,477 households at the following census of 2011. The 2016 census measured the population of the rural district as 28,353 in 7,791 households. The most populous of its 50 villages was Shahrak-e Mohammad Ebn-e Jafar, with 4,873 people.
