= Sardasht Rural District (Dezful County) =

Rural district in Khuzestan province, Iran

Sardasht Rural District Persian: دهستان سردشت
- Rural District
- Location within Iran
- Coordinates: 32°32′44″N 48°49′46″E
- Country: Iran
- Province: Khuzestan
- County: Dezful
- District: Sardasht
- Capital: Saland

Population (2016)
  - Total: 5,087
- Time zone: UTC+3:30 (IRST)

Sardasht Rural District (Persian: دهستان سردشت) is in Sardasht District of Dezful County, Khuzestan province, Iran. It is administered from the city of Saland. (Note: Formerly Sardasht)

== Demographics ==
=== Population ===
At the time of the 2006 National Census, the rural district's population was 4,851 in 886 households. There were 4,125 inhabitants in 859 households at the following census of 2011. The 2016 census measured the population of the rural district as 5,087 in 1,245 households. The most populous of its 103 villages was Gavmir, with 868 people.
