= Central District (Dezful County) =

District in Khuzestan province, Iran

Central District (Dezful County) Persian: بخش مرکزی شهرستان دزفول
- District
- Location within Iran
- Coordinates: 32°16′43″N 48°23′45″E
- Country: Iran
- Province: Khuzestan
- County: Dezful
- Capital: Dezful

Population (2016)
  - Total: 370,498
- Time zone: UTC+3:30 (IRST)

The Central District of Dezful County (Persian: بخش مرکزی شهرستان دزفول) is in Khuzestan province, Iran. Its capital is the city of Dezful.

== History ==
After the 2011 National Census, the villages of Shamsabad and Siah Mansur were elevated to city status. In 2019, the village of Shahrak-e Shahid Mohammad Montazeri was elevated to city status as Montazeran.

== Demographics ==
=== Population ===
At the time of the 2006 census, the district's population was 321,244 in 75,175 households. The following census in 2011 counted 347,261 people in 90,629 households. The 2016 census measured the population of the district as 370,498 inhabitants in 107,399 households.

=== Administrative divisions ===
Central District (Dezful County) Population
Administrative Divisions	2006	2011	2016
Qeblehi RD	25,108	27,163	28,353
Shamsabad RD	40,207	42,803	29,790
Dezful (city)	228,507	248,380	264,709
Mianrud (city)	9,199	9,033	10,110
Montazeran (city) (Note: Formerly the village of Shahrak-e Shahid Mohammad Montazeri; became a city after the 2016 census)	9,199	9,033	10,110
Safiabad (city)	8,054	9,046	9,879
Shahr-e Emam (city) (Note: Formerly Dezab)	10,169	10,836	11,393
Shamsabad (city)			10,858
Siah Mansur (city)			5,406
Total	321,244	347,261	370,498
RD = Rural District
