= Dezful County =

County in Khuzestan province, Iran

Dezful County Persian: شهرستان دزفول
- County
- Location of Dezful County in Khuzestan province (top, pink)

- Location of Khuzestan Province in Iran
- Coordinates: 32°31′N 48°58′E
- Country: Iran
- Province: Khuzestan
- Capital: Dezful
- Districts: Central, Choghamish, Sardasht, Shahiyun

Population (2016)
  - Total: 443,971
- Time zone: UTC+3:30 (IRST)

Dezful County (Persian: شهرستان دزفول) is in Khuzestan Province, Iran. Its capital is the city of Dezful.

== History ==
After the 2006 National Census, the village of Shahrak-e Hamzeh was elevated to city status as Hamzeh. In 2010, the village of Choghamish rose to city status as well. Additionally, five rural districts were separated from Sardasht District in the establishment of Shahiyun District.

After the 2011 census, the villages of Shamsabad and Siah Mansur became cities.

After the 2016 census, the village of Shahiyun rose to the status of a city. The village of Eslamabad was elevated to city status as Jandi Shapur. In 2019, the village of Shahrak-e Shahid Mohammad Montazeri was elevated to city status as Montazeran.

== Demographics ==
=== Population ===
At the time of the 2006 census, the county's population was 384,851 in 31,291 households. The following census in 2011 counted 423,552 people in 107,746 households. The 2016 census measured the population of the county as 443,971, in 125,351 households.

=== Administrative divisions ===
Dezful County's population history and administrative structure over three consecutive censuses are shown in the following table.

Dezful County Population
Administrative Divisions	2006	2011	2016
Central District	321,244	347,261	370,498
Qeblehi RD	25,108	27,163	28,353
Shamsabad RD	40,207	42,803	29,790
Dezful (city)	228,507	248,380	264,709
Mianrud (city)	9,199	9,033	10,110
Montazeran (city) (Note: Formerly the village of Shahrak-e Shahid Mohammad Montazeri; became a city after the 2016 census)	9,199	9,033	10,110
Safiabad (city)	8,054	9,046	9,879
Shahr-e Emam (city) (Note: Formerly Dezab)	10,169	10,836	11,393
Shamsabad (city)			10,858
Siah Mansur (city)			5,406
Choghamish District	28,361	30,126	31,185
Choghamish RD	15,041	13,613	13,577
Kheybar RD	13,320	14,400	15,595
Choghamish (city)		2,113	2,013
Jandi Shapur (city) (Note: Formerly the village of Eslamabad; became a city after the 2016 census)			
Sardasht District	35,246	34,149	27,726
Ahmad Fedaleh RD	1,488		
Darreh Kayad RD	1,840		
Emamzadeh Seyyed Mahmud RD	1,304		
Mahur Berenji RD	17,748	22,089	13,988
Sardasht RD	4,851	4,125	5,087
Seyyed Vali ol Din RD	2,804		
Shahi RD	3,370		
Hamzeh (city) (Note: Formerly Shahrak-e Hamzeh)		5,850	6,091
Saland (city) (Note: Formerly Sardasht)	1,841	2,085	2,560
Shahiyun District		7,272	11,529
Ahmad Fedaleh RD		1,201	3,227
Darreh Kayad RD		1,213	2,501
Emamzadeh Seyyed Mahmud RD		651	1,250
Seyyed Vali ol Din RD		1,471	1,613
Shahi RD		2,736	2,938
Shahiyun (city) (Note: Became a city after the 2016 census)			
Total	384,851	423,552	443,971
RD = Rural District

== See also ==
Media related to Dezful County at Wikimedia Commons
