= Khuzestan province =

Province of Iran

Khuzestan Province استان خوزستان
- Province
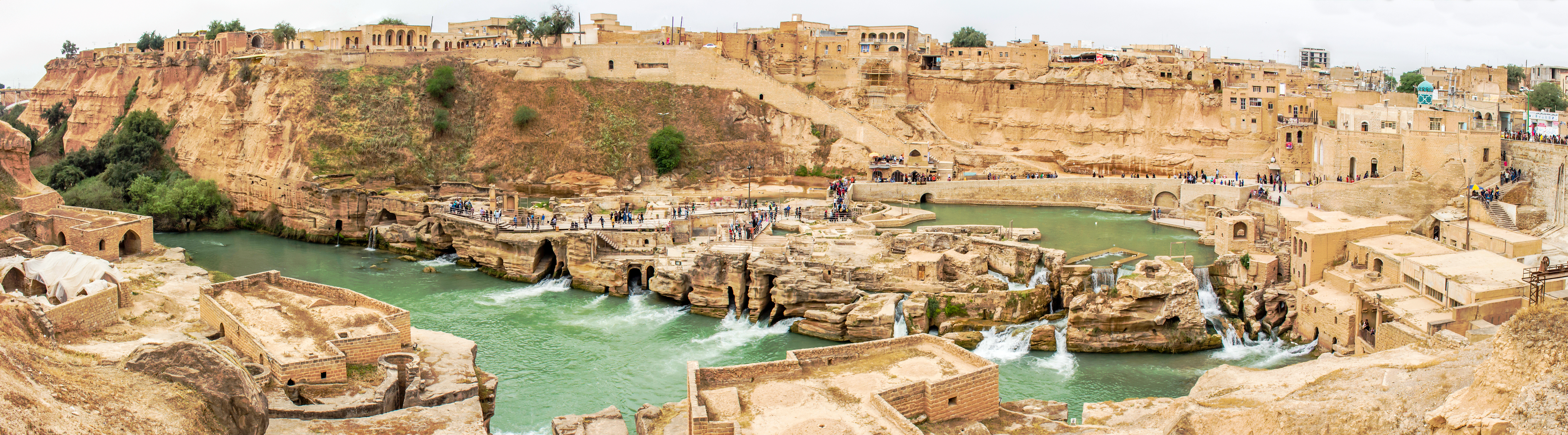
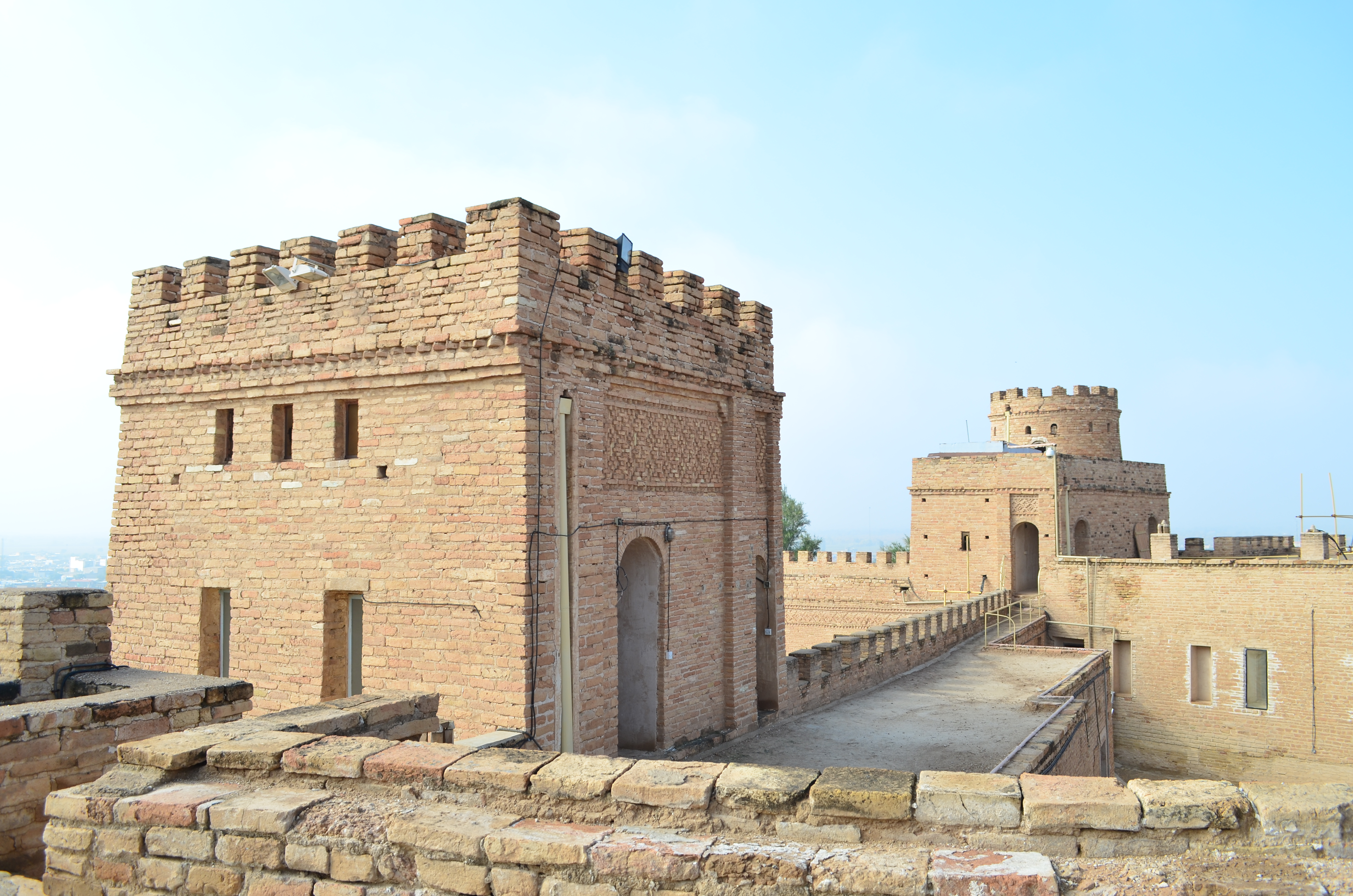
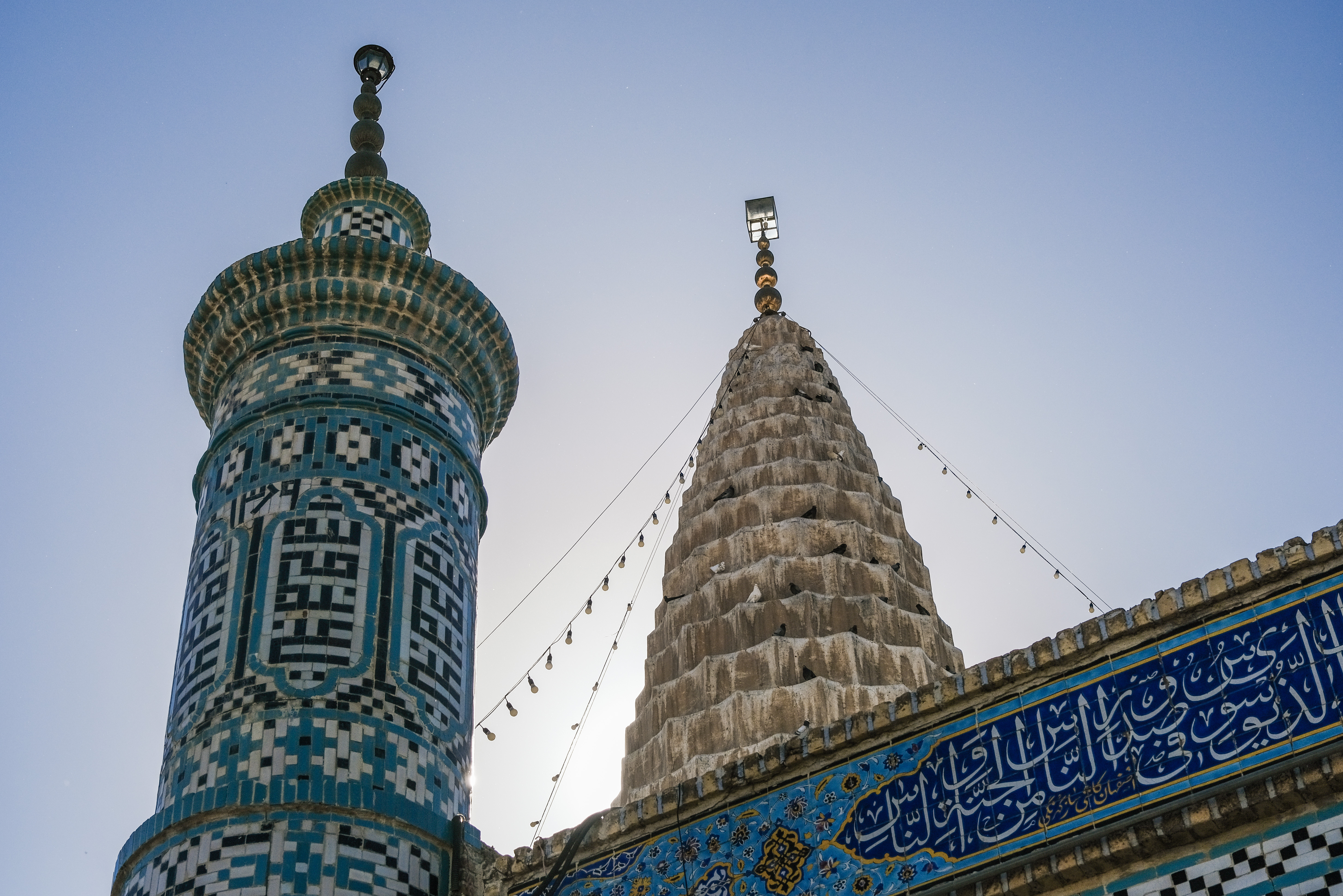
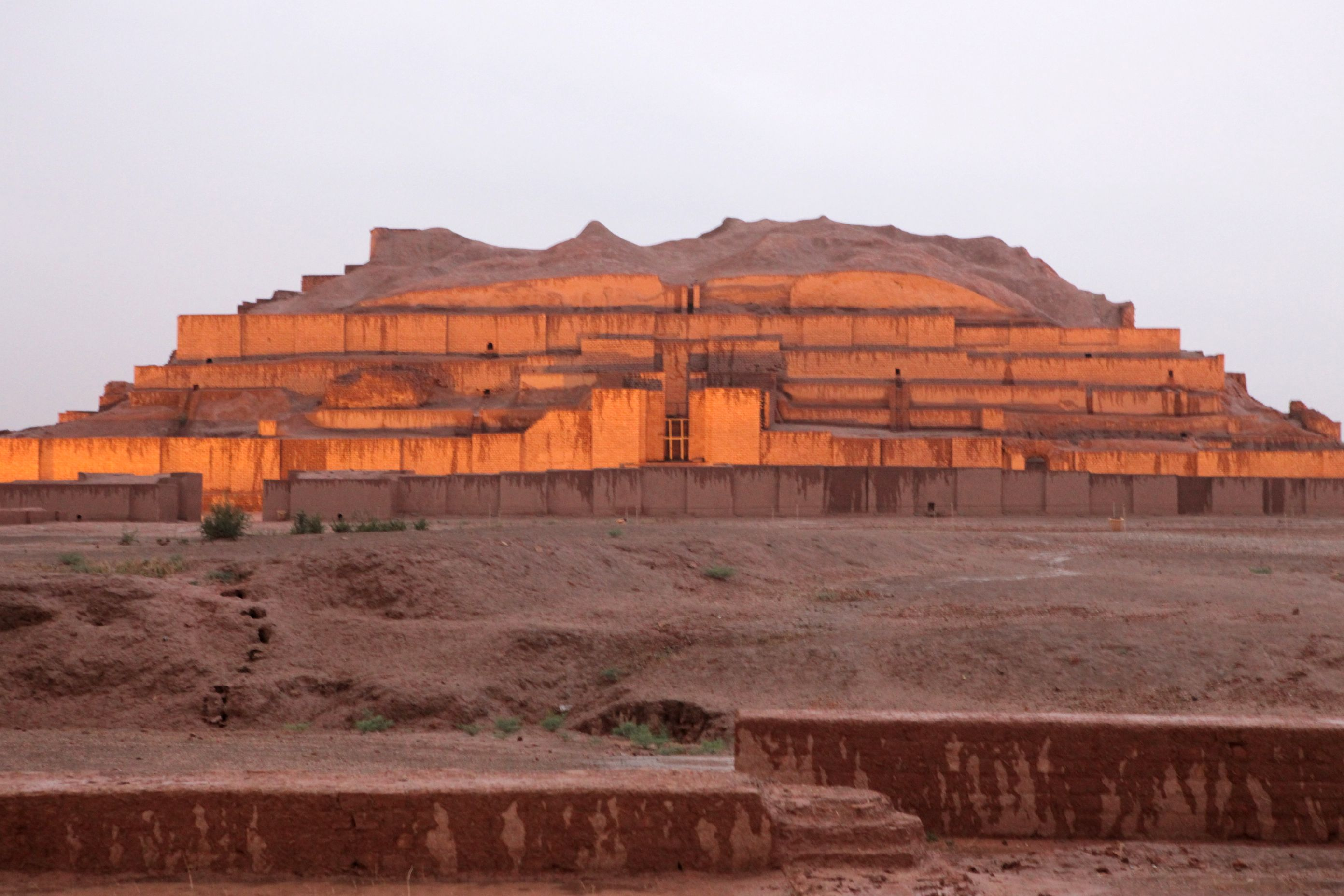
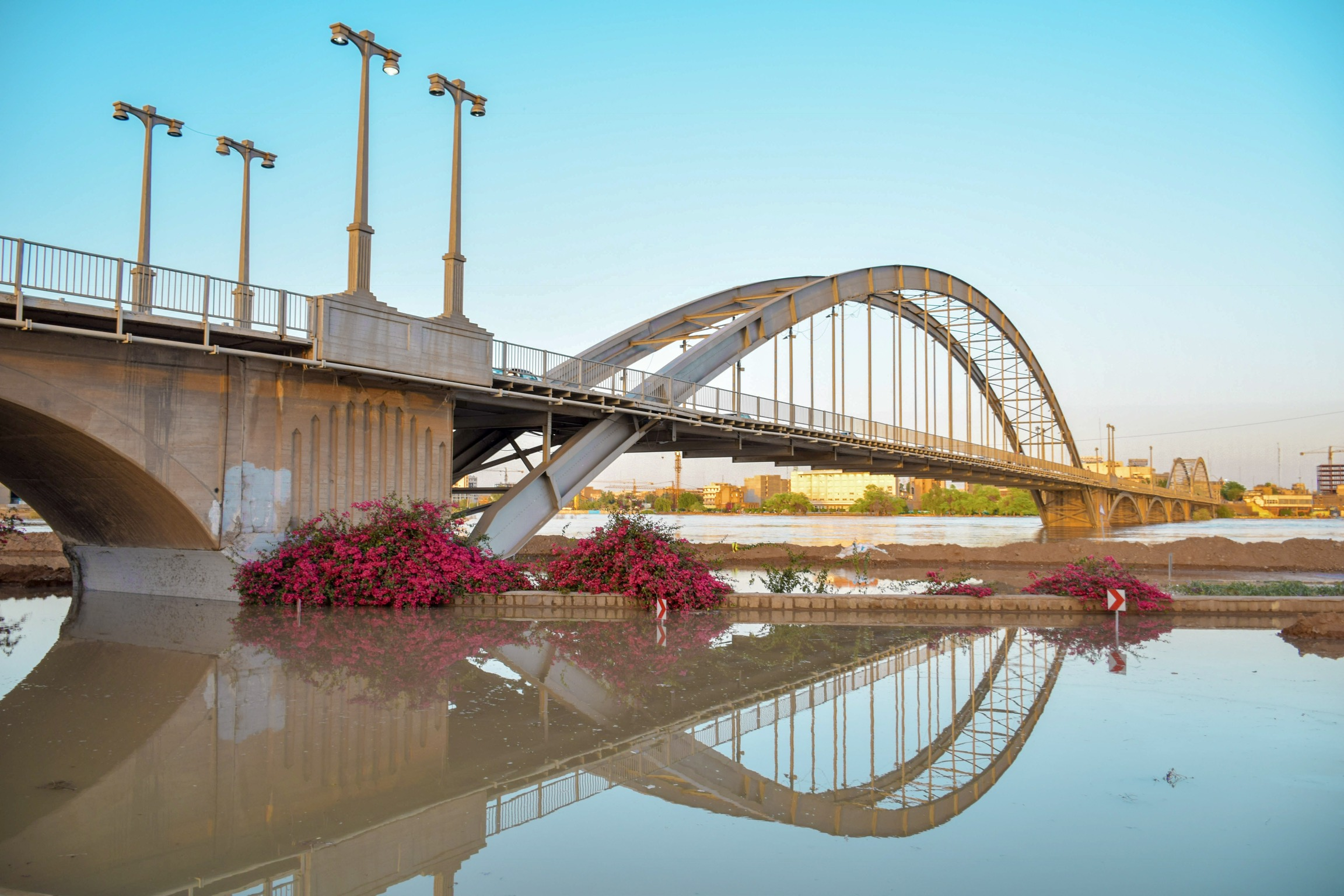
- From the top to bottom-right, Shushtar Historical Hydraulic System, Shush Castle, Tomb of Daniel, Ziggurat in Chogha Zanbil, Ahvaz

- Location of Khuzestan Province within Iran
- Coordinates: 31°20′N 48°40′E
- Country: Iran
- Region: Region 4
- Capital: Ahvaz
- Counties: 30

Government
  - Governor-general: Mohammad-Reza Mavalizadeh (Independent)

Area
  - Total: 64,055 km^{2} (24,732 sq mi)

Population (2026)
  - Total: 5,186,000
  - Density: 80.96/km^{2} (209.7/sq mi)
- Time zone: UTC+03:30 (IRST)
- Area code: 061
- ISO 3166 code: IR-06
- Main language(s): Khuzestani Arabic, Luri, Persian dialects of Khuzestan, Mandaic
- HDI (2017): 0.802 very high · 12th

Khuzestan province ([xuːzest̪ʰɒːn]; Persian: استان خوزستان) (Note: Also romanized as Ostān-e Xuzestān and Xuzestan) is one of the 31 provinces of Iran. An extension of the Mesopotamian Plain, it is located in the southwest of the country, bordering Iraq and the Persian Gulf, and covering an area of 64,055 square kilometres (24,732 mi^{2}). Its capital is the city of Ahvaz. The provincial capital was moved from Shoushtar to Ahvaz in 1924. Since 2014, the province has been part of Iran's Region 4.

Khuzestan comprises much of what historians refer to as ancient Elam, whose capital was at Susa. It was once one of the most important regions in the Ancient Near East. In modern Iran, there has been episodic conflict between the province's Arab population and the central government. Iraq invaded Khuzestan in 1980, and the invasion was reversed at the Battle of Khorramshahr in 1982. Containing Iran's largest oil field, it is a key strategic province.

== Etymology ==
In Greek and Roman sources, from the Achaemenid period until the early centuries AD, the land now called Khuzestan was known as Susiana, a name derived from the city of Susa (modern Shush), which served for a time as a capital of ancient Elam and, under the Achaemenids, as one of the imperial capitals. According to the Achaemenid royal inscriptions, however, the Achaemenids themselves (c. 520–330 BC) called this satrapy Ūja or Uvja, a name that also appears in historical texts as Hūjiya. With the rise of later dynasties such as the Parthians and Sasanians, the name Susiana gradually fell out of use, and in the Middle Persian period it was replaced by names derived from the root hūz., with the Sasanian province being named Khuzistan. Arab authors of later periods recorded this as Khūzī.

The word Hūjī occurs twenty-four times in the inscriptions of Darius the Great and once in an inscription of Xerxes I. This same word Ūja was rendered by the Greeks as Uza and Uzi, and was later written Uxi and pronounced "Uxi". Strabo and Pliny refer to the inhabitants of the region as the Uxii.

The Hūzī or Hūjī were a non-Semitic people who lived in southwestern Iran from well before the Christian era, with their capital at Susa. The word Khuzestan, which until the Safavid period took the form Hūzestān, consists of the elements hūz and -stān and means "land of the Hūz". The suffix -stān means "land", and older maps and documents indicate that the form Khūzī is an altered form of Hūzī.

The Old Persian word Hūjiya "Elam" appears abundantly in many texts and on Achaemenid inscriptions at Naqsh-e Rustam, and on Darius's epigraphs at Persepolis and Susa among others. Hūjiya, or its Greek counterpart Uxi, were names used to refer to the land or the peoples inhabiting Susiana. In Middle Persian, Hūjiya "Elam, Susiana Province" became Huź "Susiana", and the modern form of this word is Xuz. Uzistan or Huzistan, meaning the land of the Uz or Huz people, appears in Middle Persian (Sasanian Pahlavi) as well as in Parthian as hūjestān or hūžestān. In Syriac the region was called Beth Huzaye.

According to Richard N. Frye, following the large-scale migration of Arabs into Iran from the west, in particular the migration of the Banu Ka'b and Banu Lam into southwestern Khuzestan, the province's name changed semi-officially from Hūzestān to Arabistan in the Safavid period onwards, that is from the 16th to the 19th century, until under Reza Shah it was officially named Khuzestan.

== History ==
=== Antiquity ===
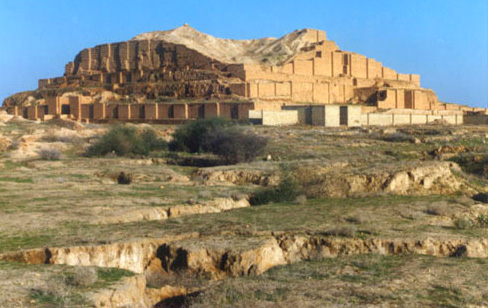
The ziggurat of Choqa Zanbil in Khuzestan was a magnificent structure of the Elamite Empire. Khuzestan's Elamites formed the first empire within the territory of present-day Iran, which was later supplanted by Semitic, Greek, and Persian empires.

The province of Khuzestan is one of the centres of ancient civilization, and one of the most important regions of the Ancient Near East, based around Susa. The first large scale empire based here was that of the powerful 4th millennium BC Elamites.

Archeological ruins verify the entire province of Khuzestan to be home to the Elamite civilization, a non-Semitic, and non-Indo-European-speaking kingdom, and the earliest civilization of within the borders of what would later be called Persia. The name Khuzestan is derived from the Elamite (ʰŪvja), likely pronounced /xuʒa/, later Middle Persian Hūzīg, Arabic al-Xūzīya.

In fact, in the words of Elton L. Daniel, the Elamites were "the founders of the first 'Iranian' empire in the geographic sense." Hence the central geopolitical significance of Khuzestan, the seat of Iran's first empire.

In 640 BC, the Elamites were defeated by Ashurbanipal, coming under the rule of the Assyrian Empire who brought destruction upon Susa and Chogha Zanbil. After the death of Ashurbanipal, the Assyrian Empire began to experience internal conflict, which was quietly taken advantage of by the Medes who had hitherto been subjects of Assyria. During the reign of the Median Cyaxares (625-585 BCE), Elam was incorporated into the Median Empire, but in 538 BC, the Persian Cyrus the Great who established the Achaemenid Empire, was able to conquer the Elamite lands from the Medes. The Persians regarded highly of Elam and the city of Susa was proclaimed as one of the Achaemenid capitals. Darius I then erected a grand palace known as Apadana there in 521 BC.

In 331 BC, following Achaemenid defeat at the Battle of the Uxian Defile, Susa was conquered by Alexander the Great, and a year later in 330 BC after suffering defeat at the Battle of the Persian Gate, Persia (the Achaemenid Empire) was conquered by the Macedonian Empire. The Susa weddings was arranged by Alexander in 324 BC in Susa, where mass weddings took place between the Persians and the Macedonians. After Alexander, the Seleucid dynasty came to rule the area.

As the Seleucid dynasty weakened, Mehrdad I the Parthian (171–137 BC), gained ascendency over the region.

Over centuries, Elam culture and peoples eventually were absorbed into these later Indo-European migrating populations. Speakers of the Elamite languages may have persisted in isolated regions of Khuzestan up until the 10th century by servants based on interpretations of a Xūzī language reported in Arab sources. Now Elamite is extinct.

=== Sassanid period ===
In 224, after the Parthians suffered defeat at the Battle of Hormozdgan, the Sassanids established control over the area. The Sassanids were responsible for the many constructions that were erected in Ahvaz, Shushtar, and the north of Andimeshk. During the early years of the reign of the Sassanian Shapur II (AD 309 or 310–379), Arabs crossed the Persian Gulf from Bahrain to "Ardashir-Khora" of Fars and raided the city. In retaliation, Shapur II led an expedition through Bahrain, defeated the combined forces of the Arab tribes of Taghleb, Bakr bin Wael, and Abd Al-Qays and advanced temporarily into Yamama in central Najd. The Sassanids nonetheless resettled the aforementioned tribes in Kerman and Ahvaz. Arabs named Shapur II, as "Shabur Dhul-aktāf" after this battle.

The existence of prominent scientific and cultural centers such as Academy of Gundishapur which gathered distinguished medical scientists from Egypt, the Byzantine Empire, and Rome, shows the importance and prosperity of this region during this era. The Jondi-Shapur Medical School was founded by the order of Shapur I. It was repaired and restored by Shapur II (a.k.a. Zol-Aktaf: "The Possessor of Shoulder Blades") and was completed and expanded during the reign of Anushirvan.

=== Muslim conquest of Khuzestan ===
==== Rashidun period ====
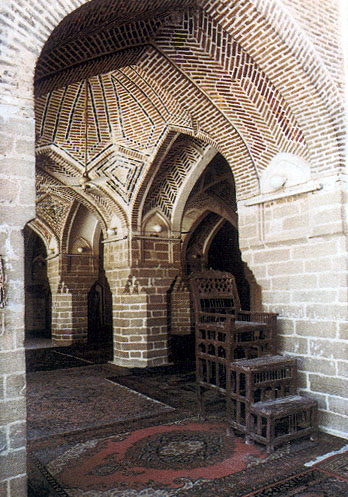
Masjed Jame' Dezful. In spite of devastating damage caused by Iraqi shelling in the Iran–Iraq War, Khuzestan still possesses a rich heritage of architecture from Islamic, Sassanid, and earlier times.

In 639, the Muslim Rashidun Caliphate forces under the command of the Arab Abu Musa al-Ash'ari defeated the Sassanids in Ahvaz and drove the Persian satrap Hormuzan out of the city. Susa later fell, so Hormuzan fled to Shushtar. The Muslims led by Abu Musa thereafter imposed a siege on the Sassanid forces in Shushtar that lasted for 18 months. Shushtar finally fell in 642 and the Muslims subsequently established full control over the area. The Khuzistan Chronicle records that an unknown Arab, living in the city, befriended a man in the army, and dug tunnels through the wall in return for a third of the spoil. The Arabs purged the Nestorians—the Exegete of the city and the Bishop of Hormizd, and all their students—but kept Hormuzan alive.

There followed the conquests of Gundeshapur and of many other districts along the Tigris. The Battle of Nahāvand finally secured Khuzestan for the Muslim armies.

During the Muslim conquest the Sassanids were allied with non-Muslim Arab tribes, which implies that those wars were religious, rather than national. For instance in 633–634, Khaled ibn Walid leader of the Muslim Army, defeated a force of the Sassanids' Arab auxiliaries from the tribes of Bakr, 'Ejl, Taghleb and Namer at 'Ayn Al-Tamr.

The Muslim settlements by military garrisons in southern Iran was soon followed by other types of expansion. Some families, for example, took the opportunity to gain control of private estates. Like the rest of Iran, the Muslim conquest thus brought Khuzestan under the rule of the Arabs of the Umayyad and Abbasid Caliphates, until Ya'qub bin Laith as-Saffar, from southeastern Iran, raised the flag of independence once more, and ultimately regained control over Khuzestan, among other parts of Iran, founding the short-lived Saffarid dynasty. From that point on, Iranian dynasties would continue to rule the region in succession as an important part of Iran.

==== Umayyad and Abbasid periods ====
In the Umayyad period, large groups of nomads from the Hanifa, Banu Tamim, and Abd al-Qays tribes crossed the Persian Gulf and occupied some of the richest Basran territories around Ahvaz and in Fars during the Second Fitna in 661–665 / 680–684 AD.

During the Abbasid period, in the second half of the 10th century, the Assad tribe, taking advantage of quarrels under the Buwayhids, penetrated into Khuzestan, where a group of Tamim had been living since pre-Islamic times. However, following the fall of the Abbasid dynasty, the flow of Arab immigrants into Persia gradually diminished, but it nonetheless continued. In the latter part of the 16th century, the Bani Kaab (pronounced Chaub in the local Gulf dialect), from Kuwait, settled in Khuzestan. And during the succeeding centuries, more Arab tribes moved from southern Iraq to Khuzestan.

=== Qajar period ===
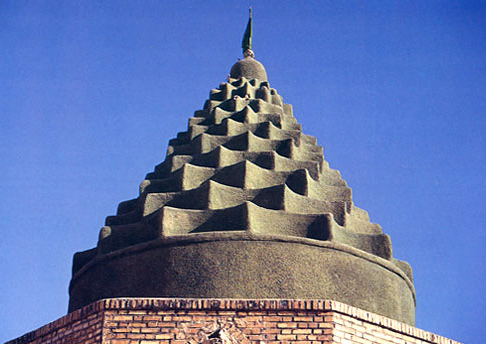
Domes like this are quite common in Khuzestan province. The shape is an architectural trademark of craftsmen of the province. Daniel's Tomb, located in Khuzestan, has such a shape. The shrine pictured here, belongs to Imamzadeh Hamzeh, located between Mahshahr and Hendijan.

According to C.E. Bosworth in Encyclopædia Iranica, under the Qajar dynasty "the province was known, as in Safavid times, as Arabistan, and during the Qajar period was administratively a governor-generalate." Half of Khuzestan was not known as Arabistan. Khuzestan's northern, more populous parts, with the capital at Shushtar, retained the old name, but also occasionally was incorporated into the district of the Greater Lur due to the large Bakhtiari population in half of Khuzestan.

In 1856, in the course of the Anglo-Persian War over the city of Herat, the British naval forces sailed up the Karun river all the way to Ahvaz. However, in the settlement that followed, they evacuated the province. Some tribal forces, such as those led by Sheikh Jabir al-Kaabi, the Sheikh of Mohammerah, fared better in opposing the invading British forces than those dispatched by the central government, which was quite feeble. But, the point of the invasion of the province and other coastal regions of southern Persia/Iran were to force the evacuation of Herat by the Persians and not the permanent occupation of these regions.

=== Pahlavi period ===
==== Arab rebellion ====
In the two decades before 1925, although nominally part of Persian territory, the western part of Khuzestan known as the Emirate of Muhammara functioned for many years effectively as an autonomous emirate known as "Arabistan". The eastern part of Khuzestan was governed by Bakhtiari khans. Following Sheikh Khazʽal Ibn Jabir's rebellion, the western part of Khuzestan's emirate was dissolved by Reza Shah government in 1925, along with other autonomous regions of Persia, in a bid to centralize the state. In response Sheikh Khaz'al of Muhammerah initiated a rebellion, which was suppressed by the Pahlavi government in late 1924 and early 1925. A low level conflict between the central Iranian government and the Arab nationalists of the province continued since.

The name of 'Khuzistan' came to be applied to the entire territory by 1936. Over the next decades of the Pahlavi rule, the province of Khuzestan remained relatively quiet, gaining to hold an important economic and defensive strategic position.

==== Oil ====
Oil has been produced commercially in the province since 1908 when the Masjed Soleyman oil field was discovered 50 miles north-east of the provincial capital, Ahvaz. This initiated a period of intense foreign exploration and political involvement, culminating in the discovery in 1953 of a further, much larger, oil field in the region by the Anglo-Persian Oil Company. The new Ahvaz field entered into production a year later, after the parliamentary regime of Prime Minister Mohammad Mosaddegh, which had sought to nationalise the oil industry, had been overthrown in a British and United States backed coup d'état in Tehran.

In the aftermath of the coup, Mohammad Reza Pahlavi consolidated power and negotiated the Consortium Agreement of 1954. Under the agreement, a consortium of European and American companies, the Iranian Oil Participants (IOP), formally acknowledged ownership of the oil and facilities by that the National Iranian Oil Company (NIOC), and agreed as the operator to share profits with Iran on a 50–50 basis. The IOP did so, however, on the understanding that the western consortium would "not to open its books to Iranian auditors or to allow Iranians onto its board of directors". The IOP continued to operate until the regime of Ayatollah Khomeini, brought to power in Shia Islamic Revolution in 1979, confiscated their assets.

Despite declining production, the Ahvaz field, owned by NIOC and operated by National Iranian South Oil Company (NISOC), remains the largest oil field and producer in Iran.

Oil production, and related investment, paved the way for the arrival in the province of other Iranian peoples, Persian and non-Persian. In the course of the 20th century, the new immigrants reduced the province's Arab majority to a plurality among its ethnic groups.

=== Islamic Republic ===
==== After the revolution ====
With the Iranian Revolution taking place in early 1979, minority ethnic rebellions swept the country. In April 1979, there was an uprising in Khuzestan led by the Arab separatist group Arab Political and Cultural Organisation (APCO) which protested the introduction of theocratic rule from Tehran and sought local autonomy or independence.

In the wake of the uprising's suppression, in 1980 a separatist group called the Arab Popular Movement in Arabistan (See Arab separatism in Khuzestan) seized the Iranian Embassy in London, taking 26 hostages. The standoff over their demand for the release of 91 of their comrades held in Iranian jails, ended in the storming of the building by the British SAS, with only one hostage-taker and one embassy staffer surviving. Decrying "the racist rule of Khomeini", APMA threatened further international action but their standing as an internal opposition group compromised by their links to Ba'athist Iraq.

==== Iran–Iraq war ====
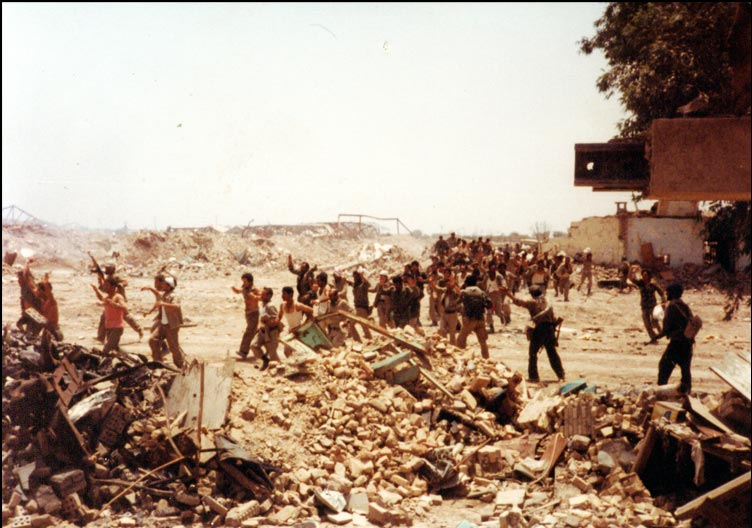
Iraqi soldiers surrender during the Liberation of Khorramshahr, 1982

During the Iran–Iraq War, Khuzestan was invaded by Iraq. As a result, Khuzestan suffered the heaviest damage and population displacement of all Iranian provinces during the war. What used to be Iran's largest refinery in Abadan was destroyed, never to fully recover. Many of the famous nakhlestans (palm groves) were annihilated, cities were destroyed, and historical sites were demolished.

Despite leading a Sunni-minority regime, Iraqi President Saddam Hussein had been confident that the predominantly Shia Arab population of Khuzestan would react enthusiastically to the prospect of union with Iraq and would undermine the Iranian resistance. However, the Iranians successfully stalled the Iraqi military advance, and eventually opened the window for a counter-offensive. While there were Ahwazi Arab groups ready to cooperate with the invaders, the war "forced Iran to help integrate the Arabs of Khuzestan by publishing Arabic texts" and by placing the defense of Khuzestan at the forefront of national propaganda.

The Battle for Khorramshahr in May 1982, proved to be a turning point in the war and is officially celebrated every year in Iran. The city, which prior to the war had been Iran's most important port, was almost completely destroyed as a result of the scorched earth policy ordered by Saddam Hussein. Iranian forces were able to prevent the Iraqis from attempting to spread the execution of this directive to other major urban centres.

Postwar recovery and development of the province was slow. Despite benefiting from abundant natural resources, including oil, Khuzestan has compounding economic, environmental, social, and construction problems. High unemployment, water scarcity, degraded air quality, and lack of civil infrastructure are among the factors that fed popular dissatisfaction. The frustrations manifested in protests and rallies.

==== Arab unrest ====
In 2005, Ahvaz witnessed a number of bombing incidents which followed upon the violent riots in Ahvaz. Another wave of Arab protests occurred in the Ahvaz and surrounding districts in 2011. The unrest, which marked the anniversary of the 2005 riots, and was interrupted by some as a response to the regional Arab Spring, lasted for 4 days and resulted in the death of more than a dozen protesters.

In 2018, Amnesty International reported that the authorities were engaged in a sweeping crackdown against Arab activists. This was in the wake of an armed attack on a military parade in Ahvaz in September, during which at least 24 people, including spectators, were killed. Tehran, meanwhile, has accused Britain, Israel, and Saudi Arabia being behind the violence.

Before the Iran–Iraq War of the 1980s, the Arabs of Khuzestan mostly resided in the rural regions along the Karkhe and Karun rivers in the southwest of the province. But after the end of the war, many displaced Arabs were relocated by the government in the urban centres and smaller towns. The previously rural population had to make difficult adjustments with few resources. When in May 2022, a ten-story residential and commercial building collapsed in Abadan, killing at least 41 people,. frustrations came to the surface, and there were extensive demonstrations.

Khuzestan Arabs have complained of discrimination and the lack of linguistic and cultural rights, of poverty ("despite inhabiting the most economically productive part of the country"), of related problems of widespread drug addiction, and of the oil industry's environmental costs (Ahvaz is reputedly the most polluted urban area in the world).

=== 2026 U.S.–Israeli airstrikes ===
On 28 February 2026, Israel and the United States launched surprise airstrikes on multiple sites and cities across Iran, killing Supreme Leader Ali Khamenei and numerous other Iranian officials. On March 12 and 13, the Israel Defense Forces struck multiple internal security sites in Khuzestan Province. Among their reported targets were the provincial headquarters of the Law Enforcement Command and of the Islamic Revolutionary Guards Corps in Ahvaz (hit the week before in an attack claimed by the Arab insurgent group, the Ahwaz Falcons), and the base of the Artesh (Iranian Army) 292nd Armored Brigade in Dezful. On March 11, Iranian authorities announced they had dismantled of an armed cell in Khuzestan, seizing weapons, ammunition and explosives intended for sabotage operations. On March 24, there were further air strikes on energy sites in Khorramshahr.

== Demographics ==
=== Languages ===
Persian has long been the language of wider communication in the cities of Khuzestan, and there are several urban Khuzestāni Persian-speaking communities in the south of the province too.

Apart from Persian, other languages and dialects are also spoken in Khuzestan. For instance, a portion of Khuzestan's populace speaks Khuzestani Arabic. Another part of Khuzestanis speak the Bakhtiari dialect of the Luri language. Neo-Mandaic is spoken by no more than a few dozen elderly Mandaeans.

Population of language and dialect speakers in Khuzestan Province (based on Iran Atlas)
| Language | Dialect | Population | Percentage |
|---|---|---|---|
| Arabic | Khuzestani Arabic | 1,600,000 | 33.8% |
| Persian | – | 1,300,000 | 27.5% |
| Luri | Bakhtiari | 940,000 | 19.9% |
| Luri | Bahmai | 190,000 | 4.0% |
| Luri | Northern Luri | 120,000 | 2.5% |
| Shushtari–Dezfuli | — | 310,000 | 6.6% |
| Behbahani–Qanavati | — | 140,000 | 2.9% |
| Southern Kurdish | — | 39,000 | 0.8% |
| Qashqai | — | 22,000 | 0.4% |
| Neo-Mandaic | — | 100 | — |
| Mixed | — | 67,000 | 1.4% |
| Total | | 4,728,100 | 100% |

=== Ethnic groups ===
Khuzestan is known for its ethnic diversity, the population of Khuzestan consists of Persians (including Dezfulis, Shushtari), Arabs, Qashqai from the Afshar tribe, Bakhtiaris, Northern-Lurs, Mandaeans, Kurds and Armenians. As part of a 2010 research commissioned by the General Culture Council, the following Iranian ethnic groups in Khuzestan were sampled: Arabs, Persians, Lurs, Qashqais, Kurds and others. A field survey was conducted as well as a statistical community among residents of 288 cities and about 1400 villages across the country. Khuzestan's population is predominantly Shia Muslim, there are small Christian, Jewish, Sunni and Mandean minorities as well.

According to a survey conducted by the Ministry of Culture in 2010, 33.6% of the population of Khuzestan (about 1.6 million people) are Iranian Arabs. According to Bettina Leitner (2022): "Although no official numbers exist, it has been estimated that around 2 to 3 million people of the inhabitants of Khuzestan are Arabs. Yet it is hard to determine, what percentage of this population uses Arabic actively." Iran Atlas (2024) estimates around 1.6 million Arabic speakers in Khuzestan, noting that its data does not account for ethnicity or multilingualism.

=== Population ===
According to the 1996 census, the province had an estimated population of 3.7 million people, of which approximately 62.5% were in the urban centres, 36.5% were rural dwellers and the remaining 1% were non-residents. According to the most recent census taken in 2016, the province had 4,710,509 inhabitants.

At the time of the 2006 National Census, the province's population was 4,192,598 in 862,491 households. The following census in 2011 counted 4,531,720 people in 1,112,664 households. The 2016 census measured the population of the province as 4,710,509 in 1,280,645 households.

=== Administrative divisions ===

The population history and structural changes of Khuzestan province's administrative divisions over three consecutive censuses are shown in the following table.

Khuzestan province
| Counties | 2006 | 2011 | 2016 |
|---|---|---|---|
| Abadan | 275,126 | 271,484 | 298,090 |
| Aghajari (Note: Separated from Behbahan and Omidiyeh Counties after the 2011 census) | — | — | 17,654 |
| Ahvaz | 1,317,377 | 1,395,184 | 1,302,591 |
| Andika (Note: Separated from Masjed Soleyman County after the 2006 census) | — | 50,797 | 47,629 |
| Andimeshk | 154,081 | 167,126 | 171,412 |
| Bagh-e Malek | 103,217 | 107,450 | 105,384 |
| Bandar Mahshahr | 247,804 | 278,037 | 296,271 |
| Bavi (Note: Separated from Ahvaz County after the 2006 census) | — | 89,160 | 96,484 |
| Behbahan | 172,597 | 179,703 | 180,593 |
| Dasht-e Azadegan | 126,865 | 99,831 | 107,989 |
| Dezful | 384,851 | 423,552 | 443,971 |
| Dezpart (Note: Separated from Izeh County after the 2016 census) | — | — | — |
| Gotvand | 58,311 | 64,951 | 65,468 |
| Haftkel (Note: Separated from Ramhormoz County after the 2006 census) | — | 22,391 | 22,119 |
| Hamidiyeh (Note: Separated from Ahvaz County after the 2011 census) | — | — | 53,762 |
| Hendijan | 35,932 | 37,440 | 38,762 |
| Hoveyzeh (Note: Separated from Dasht-e Azadegan County after the 2006 census) | — | 34,312 | 38,886 |
| Izeh | 193,510 | 203,621 | 198,871 |
| Karkheh (Note: Separated from Shush County after the 2016 census) | — | — | — |
| Karun (Note: Separated from Ahvaz County after the 2011 census) | — | — | 105,872 |
| Khorramshahr | 155,224 | 163,701 | 170,976 |
| Lali | 35,549 | 37,381 | 37,963 |
| Masjed Soleyman | 167,226 | 113,257 | 113,419 |
| Omidiyeh | 85,195 | 90,420 | 92,335 |
| Ramhormoz | 120,194 | 105,418 | 113,776 |
| Ramshir | 49,238 | 48,943 | 54,004 |
| Seydun (Note: Separated from Bagh-e Malek County after the 2016 census) | — | — | — |
| Shadegan | 138,226 | 153,355 | 138,480 |
| Shush | 189,793 | 202,762 | 205,720 |
| Shushtar | 182,282 | 191,444 | 192,028 |
| Total | 4,192,598 | 4,531,720 | 4,710,509 |

=== Cities ===
According to the 2016 census, 3,554,205 people (over 75% of the population of Khuzestan province) live in the following cities:

| City | Population |
|---|---|
| Abadan | 231,476 |
| Abezhdan | 1,673 |
| Abu Homeyzeh | 5,506 |
| Aghajari | 11,912 |
| Ahvaz | 1,184,788 |
| Alvan | 6,860 |
| Andimeshk | 135,116 |
| Arvandkenar | 11,173 |
| Azadi | 4,957 |
| Bagh-e Malek | 26,343 |
| Bandar-e Emam Khomeyni | 78,353 |
| Bandar-e Mahshahr | 162,797 |
| Behbahan | 122,604 |
| Bidrubeh | 2,386 |
| Bostan | 8,476 |
| Cham Golak | 5,446 |
| Chamran | 33,505 |
| Chavibdeh | 7,906 |
| Choghamish | 2,013 |
| Darkhoveyn | 5,655 |
| Dehdez | 5,490 |
| Dezful | 264,709 |
| Elhayi | 7,651 |
| Fath Olmobin | 2,973 |
| Golgir | 1,089 |
| Gotvand | 24,216 |
| Guriyeh | 2,890 |
| Haftkel | 15,802 |
| Hamidiyeh | 22,057 |
| Hamzeh | 6,091 |
| Hendijan | 29,015 |
| Horr | 9,177 |
| Hoseyniyeh | 1,821 |
| Hosseinabad | 8,833 |
| Hoveyzeh | 19,481 |
| Izeh | 119,399 |
| Jannat Makan | 5,360 |
| Jayezan | 2,357 |
| Khanafereh | 3,853 |
| Khorramshahr | 133,097 |
| Kut-e Abdollah | 56,252 |
| Kut-e Seyyed Naim | 4,541 |
| Lali | 18,473 |
| Mansuriyeh | 5,441 |
| Masjed Soleyman | 100,497 |
| Meydavud | 3,513 |
| Mianrud | 10,110 |
| Minushahr | 2,231 |
| Mollasani | 17,337 |
| Moshrageh | 2,095 |
| Omidiyeh | 67,427 |
| Qaleh Tall | 10,698 |
| Qaleh-ye Khvajeh | 2,408 |
| Rafi | 3,797 |
| Ramhormoz | 74,285 |
| Ramshir | 25,009 |
| Safiabad | 9,879 |
| Saland | 2,560 |
| Saleh Shahr | 7,309 |
| Sardarabad | 5,240 |
| Sardasht | 6,912 |
| Seydun | 7,650 |
| Shadegan | 41,733 |
| Shahr-e Emam | 11,393 |
| Shamsabad | 10,858 |
| Sharaft | 11,757 |
| Sheyban | 36,374 |
| Shush | 77,148 |
| Shushtar | 101,878 |
| Siah Mansur | 5,406 |
| Somaleh | 1,784 |
| Susangerd | 51,431 |
| Tashan | 4,281 |
| Torkalaki | 5,688 |
| Veys | 15,312 |
| Zahreh | 1,192 |

== Geography ==
The province of Khuzestan can be basically divided into two regions; the rolling hills and mountainous regions north of the Ahvaz Ridge, and the plains and marsh lands to its south. The area is irrigated by the Karoun, Karkheh, Jarahi and Maroun rivers. The northern section maintains a non-Persian Bakhtiari minority, while the southern section always had diverse minority groups known as Khuzis. Since the 1940s, a flood of job seekers from all over Iran to the oil and commerce centers on the Persian Gulf Coast has made the region more Persian-speaking. Presently, Khuzestan still maintains its diverse group, but does have Arabs, Persians, Bakhtiari and ethnic Qashqais and Lors.

Khuzestan has great potential for agricultural expansion, which is almost unrivaled by the country's other provinces. Large and permanent rivers flow over the entire territory contributing to the fertility of the land. Karun, Iran's most effluent river, 850 kilometers long, flows into the Persian Gulf through this province. The agricultural potential of most of these rivers, however, and particularly in their lower reaches, is hampered by the fact that their waters carry salt, the amount of which increases as the rivers flow away from the source mountains and hills. In case of the Karun, a single tributary river, Rud-i Shur ("Salty River") that flows into the Karun above Shushtar contributes most of the salt that the river carries. As such, the freshness of the Karun waters could be greatly enhanced if the Rud-i Shur could be diverted away from the Karun. The same applies to the Jarahi and Karkheh in their lower reaches. Only the Marun is exempt from this.

=== Climate ===
South of Khuzestan is one of the hottest places on earth with maximum temperatures in summer exceeding 50 °C (122 °F) sometimes, and they remain as high as 36 °C or 96.8 °F in the highest settlements. Reliable measurements in lowland cities range from −5 to 54.0 °C (23.0 to 129.2 °F). Khuzestan has desert conditions and experiences many sandstorms. The higher slopes may have either a hot-summer Mediterranean climate (Köppen Csa) or a continental Mediterranean climate (Dsa) at the very highest elevations.

In the lowland areas annual rainfall ranges from 150 to 250 millimetres or 6 to 10 inches, whilst in the foothills near Dezful it reaches around 375 millimetres or 15 inches. The highest areas of Izeh and Dezpart Counties receive between 500 and 1,000 millimetres (20 and 40 in) of precipitation, some of it as snow.

== Water ==
Iran ranks among the most water stressed countries in the world. However, Khuzestan province suffers from major water problems that were aggravated by corruption in Iran's water supply sector, lack of transparency, neglect of marginalized communities, and political favoritism. The Islamic Revolutionary Guard Corps and other politically connected entities control water resources, prioritizing projects for political and economic gain rather than public need. They divert supplies to favored regions, causing shortages in vulnerable provinces like Khuzestan and Sistan-Baluchestan. For example, water diversion projects in Isfahan and Yazd provinces receive priority despite critical shortages in Khuzestan and Sistan-Baluchestan. Reports also indicate that certain agricultural and industrial enterprises with ties to the Iranian Revolutionary Guard Corps have received significant amounts of water, while small farmers and rural communities struggle with severe shortages.

Iran's central government prioritizes water allocation for industrial and urban centers, often at the expense of rural and minority populations. These groups face severe water shortages, ecological degradation, and a loss of livelihoods. This pattern of unequal development not only exacerbates regional disparities but also fuels social unrest and environmental crises. Iran's water policy is also characterized by an overreliance on dam construction and large-scale diversion projects, primarily benefiting politically connected enterprises and urban elites. This has led to the drying of rivers, wetlands, and other vital ecosystems, intensifying dust storms and land subsidence in regions like Khuzestan and Sistan-Baluchestan. Such environmental degradation, combined with insufficient governmental oversight and transparency, worsens living conditions for marginalized communities, reinforcing cycles of poverty and socio-political marginalization.

=== Migration from Khuzestan province ===
Historically, Khuzestan, one of Iran's most water-rich provinces, has been hit hard by the mismanagement of water resources. The drying of rivers, including the Karkheh and Karun, has made agriculture unsustainable in many parts of the province. In recent years, Khuzestan has witnessed a significant exodus of its rural population as people move to cities for work and better living conditions. The situation has been exacerbated by periodic dust storms, which further degrade the environment and make life untenable in affected regions. This environmental migration from Khuzestan has led to social tensions in the region, as local communities face declining living standards and heightened unemployment.

== Politics ==
Khuzestan is ethnically diverse, home to many different ethnic groups. This has a bearing on Khuzestan's electoral politics, with ethnic minority rights playing a significant role in the province's political culture. The province's geographical location bordering Iraq and its oil resources also make it a politically sensitive region, particularly given its history of foreign intervention, notably the Iraqi invasion of 1980.

Some ethnic groups complain over the distribution of the revenue generated by oil resources with claims that the central government is failing to invest profits from the oil industry in employment generation, post-war reconstruction and welfare projects. Low human development indicators among local Khuzestanis are contrasted with the wealth generation of the local oil industry. Minority rights are frequently identified with strategic concerns, with ethnic unrest perceived by the Iranian government as being generated by foreign governments to undermine the country's oil industry and its internal stability. The politics of Khuzestan therefore have international significance and go beyond the realm of electoral politics.

According to Jane's Information Group, "Most Iranian Arabs seek their constitutionally guaranteed rights and do not have a separatist agenda. ... While it may be true that some Arab activists are separatists, most see themselves as Iranians first and declare their commitment to the state's territorial integrity."

== Culture ==
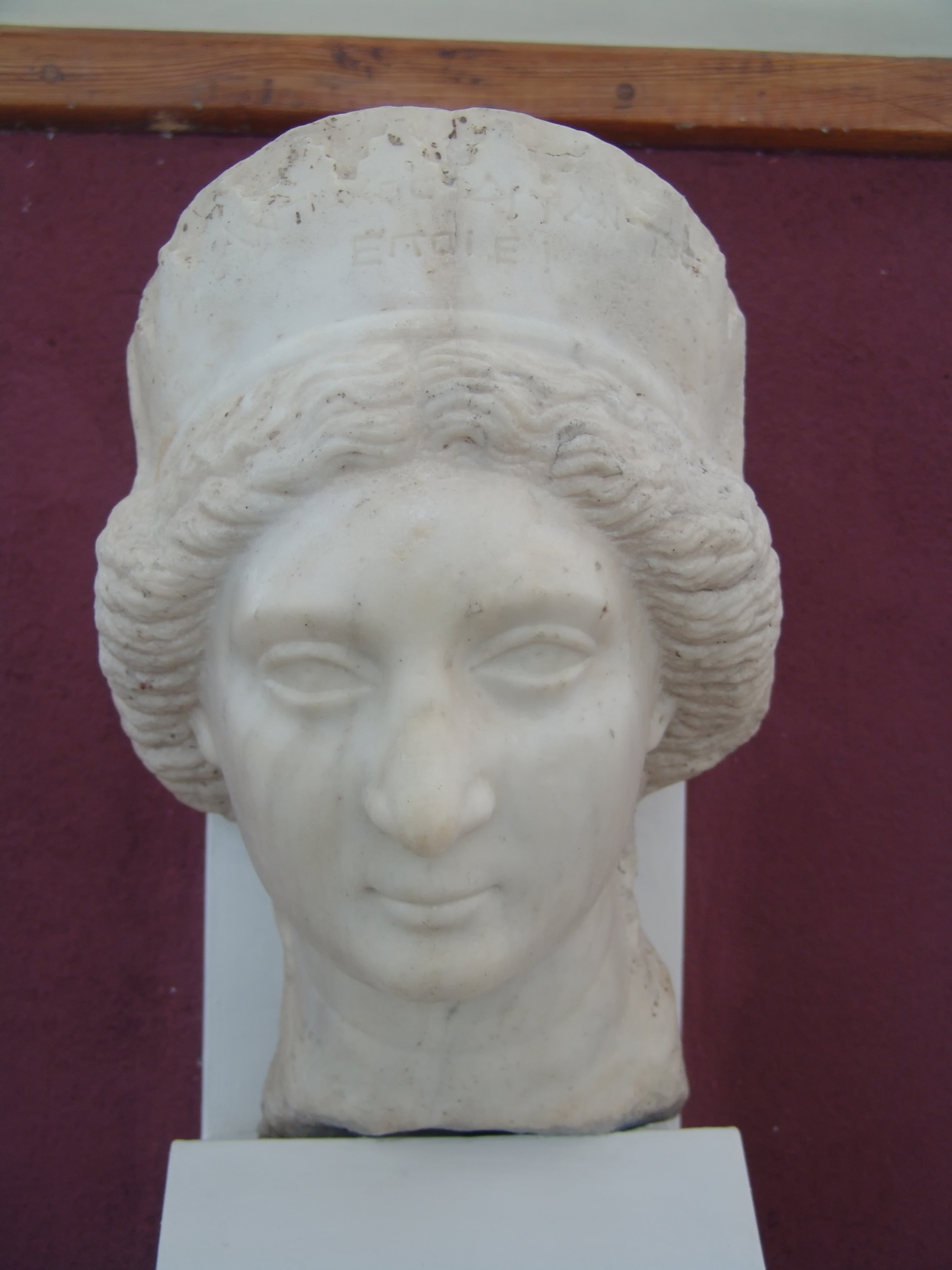
A bust from The National Museum of Iran of Queen Musa, wife of Phraates IV of Parthia, excavated by a French team in Khuzestan in 1939.

=== In literature ===
Khuzestan has long been the subject of many a writer and poet of Persia, banking on its ample sugar production to use the term as allegory for sweetness. Some popular verses are:

"Her lips aflow with sweet sugar,
The sweet sugar that aflows in Khuzestan."
Nizami

"Your graceful figure like the cypress in Kashmar,
Your sweet lips like the sugar of Khuzestan."
Nizari Qohistani

"So Sām hath not need ride afar
from Ahvaz up to Qandehar."
Ferdosi

=== Traditions and religion ===
The people of Khuzestan are predominantly Shia Muslims, with small Sunni Muslim, Jewish, Christian, and Mandaean minorities. Khuzestanis are also very well regarded for their hospitality and generosity.

=== Cuisine ===
Seafood is the most important part of Khuzestani cuisine, but many other dishes are also featured. The most popular Khuzestani dish is Ghalyeh Mahi, a fish dish that is prepared with heavy spices, onions and cilantro. The fish used in the dish is locally known as mahi soboor (shad fish), a species of fish found in the Persian Gulf. Other provincial specialties include Ghalyeh Meygu ("shrimp casserole"), ashe-mohshala (a Khorramshahri breakfast stew), sær shir (a Dezfuli breakfast of heavy cream), hælim (a Shushtari breakfast of wheatmeal with shredded lamb), and kohbbeh (a deep-fried rice cake with ground beef filling and other spices of Arabic origin, a variant on Levantine kibbeh).

=== Historical figures ===
Many scientists, philosophers, and poets have come from Khuzestan, including Abu Nuwas, Abdollah ibn-Meymun Ahvazi, the astronomer Nowbækht-e Ahvazi and his sons as well as Jorjis, the son of Bakhtshua Gondishapuri, Ibn Sakit, Da'bal-e Khazai and Sheikh Mortedha Ansari, a prominent Shi'a scholar from Dezful.

=== Attractions of Khuzestan ===
Iran National Heritage Organization lists 140 sites of historical and cultural significance in Khuzestan, reflecting the fact that the province was once the seat of Iran's most ancient empire.

Some of the more popular sites of attraction include:

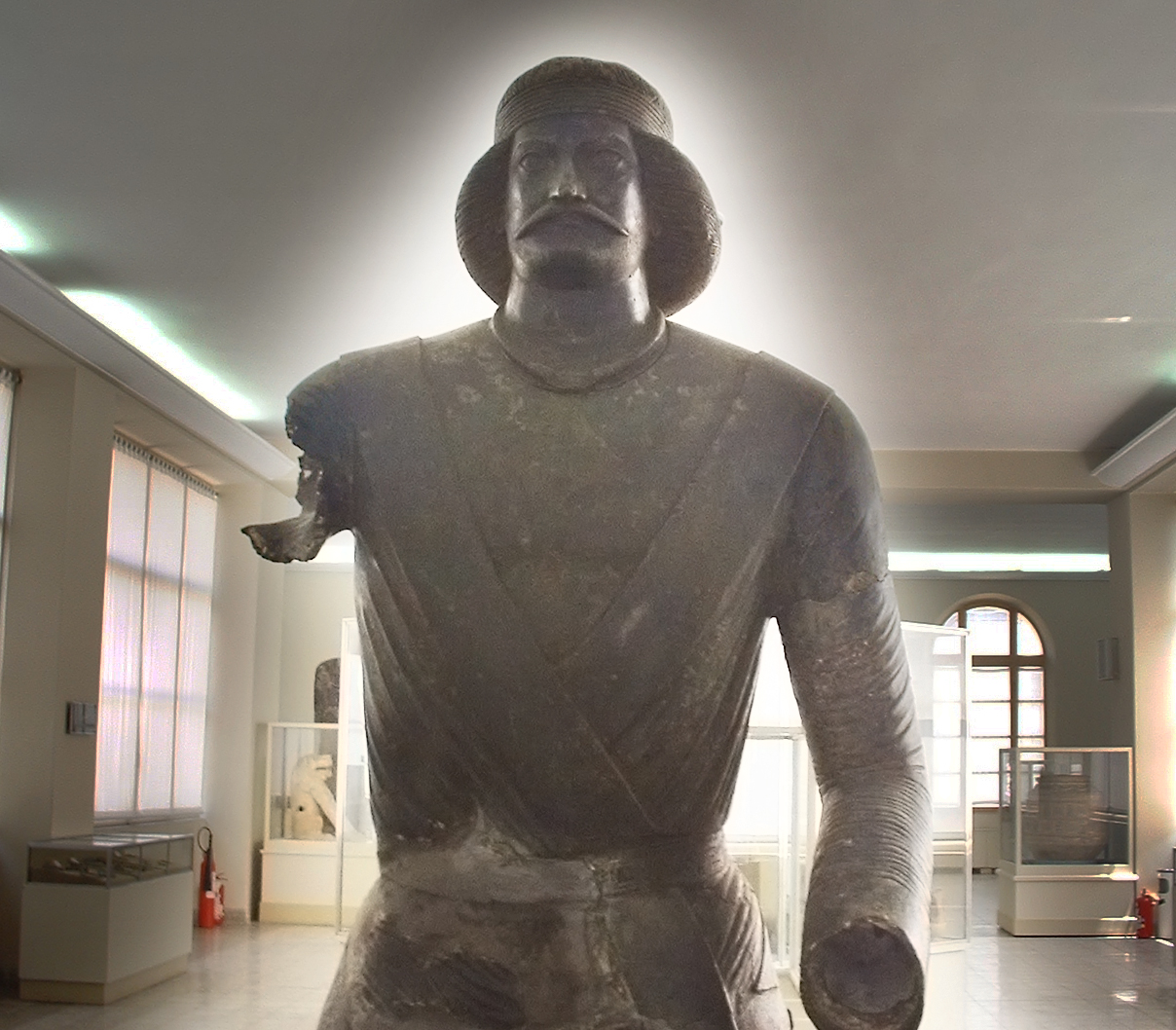
The Parthian Prince, found in Khuzestan c. AD 100, is kept at The National Museum of Iran, Tehran.

- Choqa Zanbil: The seat of the Elamite Empire, this ziggurat is a magnificent five-story temple that is one of the greatest ancient monuments in the Middle-East today. The monolith, with its labyrinthine walls made of thousands of large bricks with Elamite inscription, manifest the sheer antiquity of the shrine. The temple was religiously sacred and built in the honor of Inshushinak, the protector deity of the city of Susa.
- Shush-Daniel: Burial site of the Jewish prophet Daniel. He is said to have died in Susa on his way to Jerusalem upon the order of Darius. The grave of Ya'qub bin Laith as-Saffar, who rose against the oppression of the Umayyad Caliphate, is also located nearby.
- Dezful (Dezh-pol), whose name is taken from a bridge (pol) over the Dez river having 12 spans built by the order of Shapur I. This is the same bridge that was called "Andamesh Bridge" by historians such as Istakhri who says the city of Andimeshk takes its name from this bridge. Muqaddasi called it "The City of the Bridge."
- Shushtar, home to the famous Shushtar Watermills and one of the oldest fortress cities in Iran, known as the "City of Forty Elders" in local dialect. In and around Shushtar, there are many displays of ancient hydraulic engineering. There are also the Band Mizan and Band Qeysar, 2000-year-old dams on the Karoun river and the famous Shadervan Bridge which is over 2000 years old. The Friday Mosque of Shushtar was built by the Abbasids. The mosque, which features "Roman" arches, has 54 pillars and balconies.
- Izeh, or Izaj, was one of the main targets of the invading Islamic army in their conquest of Persia. Kharezad Bridge, one of the strangest bridges of the world, was situated in this city and was named after Ardeshir Babakan's mother. It is built over cast pillars of lead each 104 meters high. Ibn Battuta, who visited the city in the 14th century, refers to many monasteries, caravanserais, aqueducts, schools, and fortresses in the town. The brass statue of The Parthian Man, kept at the National Museum of Iran, is from here.
- Masjed Soleiman, another ancient town, has ancient fire altars and temples such as Sar-masjed and Bard-neshondeh. It is also the winter's resting area of the Bakhtiari tribe, and where William Knox D'Arcy dug Iran's first oil well.
- Abadan is said to be where the tomb of Elijah, the long lived Hebrew prophet is.
- Iwan of Hermes, and Iwan of Karkheh, two enigmatic ruins north of Susa.

== Economy ==
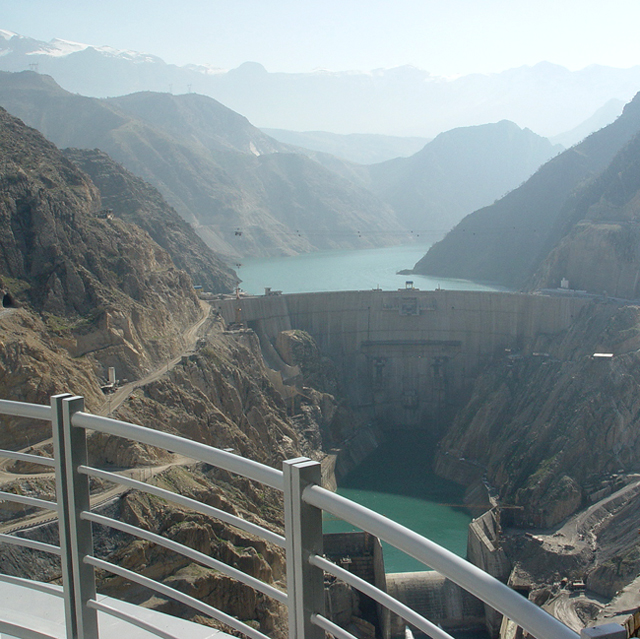
The government of Iran is spending large amounts of money in Khuzestan province. The massive Karun-3 dam, was inaugurated recently as part of a drive to boost Iran's growing energy demands.

Khuzestan is the major oil-producing region of Iran, and as such is one of the wealthiest provinces in Iran. Khuzestan ranks third among Iran's provinces in GDP.

In 2005, Iran's government announced it was planning the country's second nuclear reactor to be built in Khuzestan province. The 360 MW reactor will be a light water PWR Reactor.

Khuzestan is also home to the Arvand Free Trade Zone. It is one of six economic Free Trade Zones in Iran, including the PETZONE (Petrochemical Special Economic Zone in Mahshahr).

=== Shipping ===
The Karun River is the only navigable river in Iran. The British, up until recent decades, after the discovery by Austen Henry Layard, transported their merchandise via Karun's waterways, passing through Ahvaz all the way up to Langar near Shushtar, and then sent by road to Masjed Soleyman, the site of their first oil wells in the Naftoon oil field. Karoun is capable of the sailing of fairly large ships as far up as Shushtar.

Karkheh, Jarrahi, Arvandrood, Handian, Shavoor, Bahmanshir (Bahman-Ardeshir), Maroon-Alaa', Dez, and many other rivers and water sources in the form of Khurs, lagoons, ponds, and marshes demonstrate the vastness of water resources in this region, and are the main reason for the variety of agricultural products developed in the area.

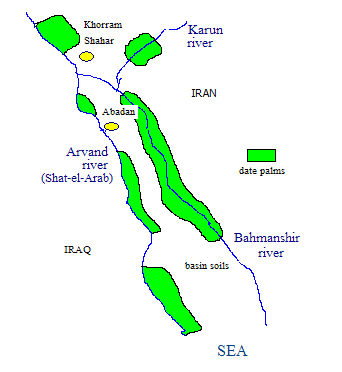
Sketch of the Abadan island showing rivers and date palm plantations

=== Agriculture ===
The abundance of water and the fertility of the soil have made this region a rich and well-endowed land. The variety of agricultural products such as wheat, barley, oilseeds, rice, eucalyptus, medicinal herbs; the existence of many palm and citrus farms; the proximity of mountains suitable for raising olives, and of course sugar cane—from which Khuzestan takes its name—all show the great potential of this fertile region. In 2005, 51,000 hectares of land were planted with sugar canes, producing 350,000 tons of sugar. The abundance of water supplies, rivers, and dams, also have an influence on the fishery industries, which are prevalent in the area.

The Abadan island is an important area for the production of datepalms, but it has suffered from the invasion of the Iraqi army during the Iran–Iraq War. The palm groves are irrigated by tidal irrigation. At high tide, the water level in the rivers is set up and the river flow enters the irrigation canals that have been dug from the river towards the inland plantations. At low tide, the canals drain the unused part of the water back to the river.

=== Industry ===
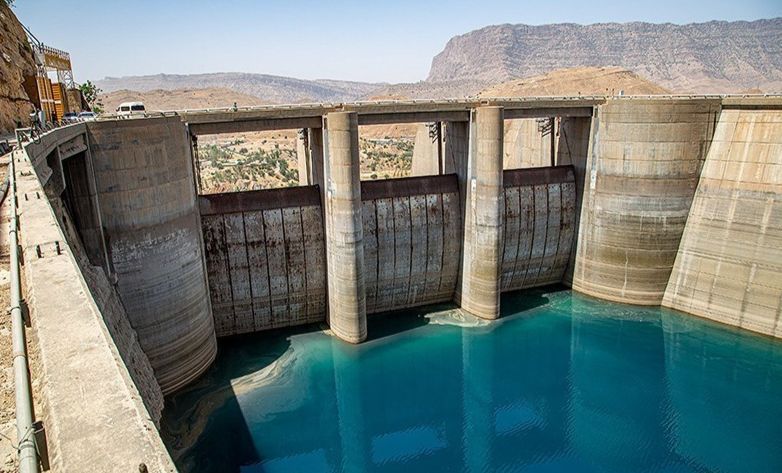
Shahid Abbaspour Dam

There are several cane sugar mills in Khuzestan province, among them Haft Tepe and Karun Agro Industry near Shushtar.

The Karun 3 and 4, and Karkheh Dam, as well as the petroleum reserves provide Iran with national sources of revenue and energy. The petrochemical and steel industries, pipe making, the power stations that feed the national electricity grid, the chemical plants, and the large refineries are some of Iran's major industrial facilities.

=== Oil ===
The province is also home to Yadavaran Field, which is a major oil field in itself and part of the disputed Al-Fakkah Field. Khuzestan holds 80% of Iran's onshore oil reserves, and thus 57% of Iran's total oil reserves, making it indispensable to the Iranian economy.

== Higher education ==
- Khorramshahr University of Nautical Sciences and Technologies
- Institute for Higher Education ACECR Khouzestan
- Ahvaz Jundishapur University of Medical Sciences
- Petroleum University of Technology
- Shahid Chamran University of Ahvaz
- Shahid Chamran University – Dezful
- Abadan University of Medical Sciences
- Dezful University of Medical Sciences
- Rahnama Institute of Higher Education
- MehrArvand University
- PNU of Abadan
- Islamic Azad University, Ahvaz Branch
- Islamic Azad University – Science & Research Branch, Khuzestan
- Islamic Azad University of Abadan
- Islamic Azad University of Shushtar
- Islamic Azad University, Masjed Soleyman Branch
- Islamic Azad University of Abadan
- Islamic Azad University of Omidiyeh
- Islamic Azad University of Ahvaz
- Islamic Azad University of Behbahan
- Islamic Azad University of Izeh
- Islamic Azad University, Mahshahr Branch
- Amirkabir University of Technology, Mahshahr campus
- Ramin Agriculture and Natural Resources University of Khuzestan
- Payame Noor University of Ahvaz
- Amiralmoemenin University

== Notable people ==
- Antiochus III the Great, 6th ruler of the Seleucid Empire
- Mohammad Ali Mousavi Jazayeri, previous Wali-Faqih representative, Ahvaz Friday Imam
- Siavash Shams, famous Persian pop singer, songwriter and record producer
- Mehrangiz Kar, feminist lawyer and human rights activist
- Ezzat Negahban, Patriarch of the Iranian modern archaeology
- Siavash Ghomeyshi, singer, songwriter and composer
- Kaiser Aminpour, famous poet
- Hamid Dabashi, intellectual historian, cultural and literary critic
- Patrick Monahan, Irish comedian
- Parviz Abnar, sound recordist
- Saeed Abdevali, wrestler
- Nasser Taghvaee, director, photographer
- Parviz Dehdari, well-known footballer
- Mohsen Chavoshi, pop singer
- Bizhan Emkanian, actor
- Hamed Haddadi, NBA athlete
- Ali Shamkhani, Iran's minister of defense (1997–2005), Secretary of the Supreme National Security Council
- Masoud Shojaei, national football star
- Hossein Kaebi, national football star
- Jalal Kameli Mofrad, national football player
- Iman Mobali, national football star
- Ahmad Mahmoud, novelist
- Mohammad Reza Eskandari, Iran's minister of agriculture (2017–2021)
- Mohsen Rezaee, Secretary of Iran's powerful Expediency Discernment Council until 2021
- Abu Nuwas, a well-known poet
- Majusi, famous physician
- Naubakht, astronomer
- Seyyed Nematollah Jazayeri, Shia Islam scholar
- Ali Hashemi, commander in the Iran–Iraq War

== Bibliography ==
- Ahmady, Kameel (2023). From Border to Border. Moldova: Scholars' Press publishes. ISBN 9786206769538.
- The Iran-Iraq War (Revised & Expanded Edition): Volume 1 – The Battle For Khuzestan, September 1980 – May 1982. by E.R. Hooton (Author), Tom Cooper (Author), Farzin Nadimi (Author)
- Ahmadi, Shaherzad, Bordering on War: A Social and Political History of Khuzestan. University of Texas Press (2024) Austin, TX, ISBN 978-1-4773-2993-1

== See also ==
- Ahvaz
- Andimeshk
- Shushtar
- Susa
- Choqa Zanbil
- Rahian-e Noor
- Muslim conquest of Khuzestan
- Muslim conquest of Persia
- Origin of the name Khuzestan
- Mesopotamian Marshes
- The Ascetical Homilies of Isaac the Syrian
- Tidal irrigation in Abadan Island
