= Bonvar =

Bonvar or Benvar (Persian: بنوار) may refer to:

- Benvar, Lali
- Benvar, Shadegan
- Benvar-e Kuchek
- Benvar-e Olya
- Benvar-e Sofla
- Benvar-e Vosta
- Bonvar Hoseyn
- Bonvar-e Nazer
- Bonvar-e Shami
- Bonvar-e Yaqub

== See also ==
- Benivar (disambiguation)
