= Maksar (disambiguation) =

Maksar is a village in Khuzestan Province, Iran

Maksar or Moksar (Persian: مكسر) may refer to:

- Maksar-e Magatif
- Maksar-e Olya
- Maksar-e Sofla
- Maksar-e Vosta
