= Hamzeh =

Hamzeh (Persian: خمزه or حمزه), also rendered as Khamzeh, may refer to:

- Hamzeh, Dezful
- Hamzeh, Ilam (حمزه - Ḩamzeh)
- Hamzeh, Shush (حمزه - Ḩamzeh)
- Hamzeh-ye Olya, Khuzestan province
- Hamzeh-ye Sofla, Khuzestan province

== See also ==
- Shahrak-e Hamzeh (disambiguation)
