= Maqtu =

Maqtu (Persian: مقطوع) may refer to:

- Maqtu-e Olya
- Maqtu-e Sofla
- Maqtu-e Vosta

The word can also be a Romanisation of the Arabic literary genre-term maqṭūʿ.

== See also ==
- Magtu (disambiguation)
