= Selas-e Olya =

Selas-e Olya ثلث عليا
- Village
- Country: Iran
- Province: Khuzestan
- County: Mahshahr
- Bakhsh: Central
- Rural District: Jarahi

Population (2006)
  - Total: 57
- Time zone: UTC+3:30 (IRST)
  - Summer (DST): UTC+4:30 (IRDT)

Selas-e Olya (Persian: ثلث عليا, also Romanized as S̱elas̱-e ‘Olyā) is a village in Jarahi Rural District, in the Central District of Mahshahr County, Khuzestan Province, Iran. At the 2006 census, its population was 57, in 10 families.
