= Moheydar =

Moheydar محيدر
- Village
- Location within Iran
- Coordinates: 30°42′31″N 49°04′54″E
- Country: Iran
- Province: Khuzestan
- County: Mahshahr
- Bakhsh: Central
- Rural District: Jarahi

Population (2006)
  - Total: 84
- Time zone: UTC+3:30 (IRST)
  - Summer (DST): UTC+4:30 (IRDT)

Moheydar (Persian: محيدر, also Romanized as Moḩeydar) is a village in Jarahi Rural District, in the Central District of Mahshahr County, Khuzestan Province, Iran. Moheydar is located about 369 miles south of the Iranian capital, Tehran. At the 2006 census, its population was 84, in 16 families.
