= Albu Hardan-e Olya =

Albu Hardan-e Olya البوحردان عليا
- Village
- Location within Iran
- Coordinates: 30°40′52″N 49°09′32″E
- Country: Iran
- Province: Khuzestan
- County: Mahshahr
- Bakhsh: Central
- Rural District: Jarahi

Population (2006)
  - Total: 100
- Time zone: UTC+3:30 (IRST)
  - Summer (DST): UTC+4:30 (IRDT)

Albu Hardan-e Olya (Persian: البوحردان عليا, also Romanized as Ālbū Ḩardān-e ‘Olyā; also known as Abū Ḩardān-e ‘Olyā, Bahārdān, and Bahārdān-e Bālā) is a village in Jarahi Rural District, in the Central District of Mahshahr County, Khuzestan Province, Iran. At the 2006 census, its population was 100, in 22 families.
