= Tovjiyeh-ye Bala =

Tovjiyeh-ye Bala تويجيه بالا
- Village
- Location within Iran
- Coordinates: 30°45′00″N 49°00′35″E
- Country: Iran
- Province: Khuzestan
- County: Mahshahr
- Bakhsh: Central
- Rural District: Jarahi

Population (2006)
  - Total: 150
- Time zone: UTC+3:30 (IRST)
  - Summer (DST): UTC+4:30 (IRDT)

Tovjiyeh-ye Bala (Persian: تويجيه بالا, also Romanized as Ţovjīyeh-ye Bālā; also known as Toveyjīyeh-ye Pā’īn and Ţovjīyeh) is a village in Jarahi Rural District, in the Central District of Mahshahr County, Khuzestan Province, Iran. At the 2006 census, its population was 150, in 22 families.
