= Hashcheh =

Hashcheh (Persian: هشچه), also rendered Haitcha and Hashjeh, may refer to:

- Hashcheh-ye Makineh
- Hashcheh-ye Olya
- Hashcheh-ye Sofla
