= Abu Seyleh-ye Sofla =

Abu Seyleh-ye Sofla ابوسيله سفلي
- Village
- Location within Iran
- Coordinates: 30°39′00″N 49°00′00″E
- Country: Iran
- Province: Khuzestan
- County: Mahshahr
- Bakhsh: Central
- Rural District: Jarahi

Population (2006)
  - Total: 20
- Time zone: UTC+3:30 (IRST)
  - Summer (DST): UTC+4:30 (IRDT)

Abu Seyleh-ye Sofla (Persian: ابوسيله سفلي, also Romanized as Abū Seyleh-ye Soflá) is a village in Jarahi Rural District, in the Central District of Mahshahr County, Khuzestan Province, Iran. At the 2006 census, its population was 20, in 4 families.
