= Abu Honeyvar =

Abu Honeyvar ابوحنيور
- Village
- Location within Iran
- Coordinates: 30°39′37″N 49°12′14″E
- Country: Iran
- Province: Khuzestan
- County: Mahshahr
- Bakhsh: Central
- Rural District: Jarahi

Population (2006)
  - Total: 47
- Time zone: UTC+3:30 (IRST)
  - Summer (DST): UTC+4:30 (IRDT)

Abu Honeyvar (Persian: ابوحنيور, also Romanized as Abū Honeyvar; also known as Abū Hīnvar) is a village in Jarahi Rural District, in the Central District of Mahshahr County, Khuzestan Province, Iran. At the 2006 census, its population was 47, in 10 families.
