= Soveyreh (disambiguation) =

Soveyreh is a village in Khuzestan Province, Iran.

Soveyreh (Persian: سويره) may also refer to:

- Hashcheh-ye Olya
- Sadeyreh-ye Olya
- Sadeyreh-ye Sofla
