= Air Force Housing, Khuzestan =

Air Force Housing, Khuzestan منازل نيروئ هوايي
- Village/military housing
- Country: Iran
- Province: Khuzestan
- County: Mahshahr
- Bakhsh: Central
- Rural District: Jarahi

Population (2006)
  - Total: 117
- Time zone: UTC+3:30 (IRST)
  - Summer (DST): UTC+4:30 (IRDT)

Air Force Housing, Khuzestan (Persian: منازل نيروئ هوايي – Manāzel Nīrūy Havāyī) is a village and military housing in Jarahi Rural District, in the Central District of Mahshahr County, Khuzestan Province, Iran. At the 2006 census, its population was 117, in 42 families.
