= Shalivet =

Shalivet شليوط
- Village
- Location within Iran
- Coordinates: 30°46′57″N 49°13′00″E
- Country: Iran
- Province: Khuzestan
- County: Mahshahr
- Bakhsh: Central
- Rural District: Jarahi

Population (2006)
  - Total: 149
- Time zone: UTC+3:30 (IRST)
  - Summer (DST): UTC+4:30 (IRDT)

Shalivet (Persian: شليوط, also Romanized as Shalīvet and Sheleyvāt; also known as Shīlīvāt, Shiliwath, Showleyvat, Showleyvet, and Showlivet) is a village in Jarahi Rural District, in the Central District of Mahshahr County, Khuzestan Province, Iran. At the 2006 census, its population was 149, in 26 families.
