= Musa Bay =

Bay in Khuzestan Province, Iran

Musa Bay خور موسی (Persian)
- Bay
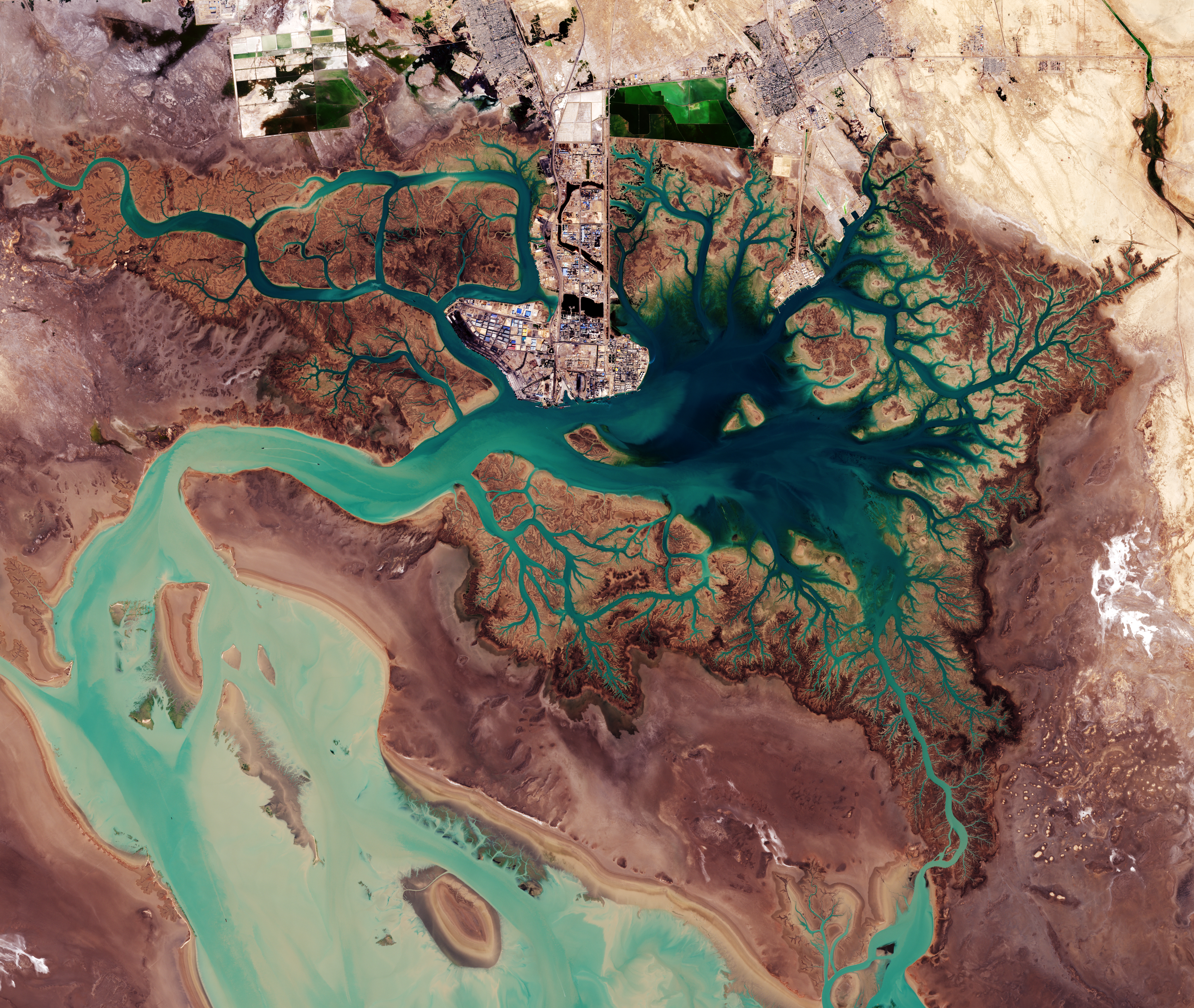

- Coordinates: 30°10′18″N 49°4′2″E
- Part of: Persian Gulf

Dimensions
  - Width: 37-40 km
  - Depth: 20-50m (73m max)

Musa Bay is a bay in the northwest end of the Persian Gulf. It is located in the Bandar-e Emam Khomeyni District, Mahshahr County, Khuzestan. Musa is said to have been a famous captain after whom this bay was named.

== Geography ==
Musa Bay is 20-50m deep, reaching 73m in some places. The lands around this bay are muddy with a height of 2-4m above sea level. The width of its opening is 37-40 km and its length from the opening to Bandar-e Emam Khomeyni is 90 km and to Bandar-e Mahshahr is 120 km.

Other small creeks branch off from Musa bay, mostly off the western side, and from south to north, they are Selech creek, Melh creek, Qanaqa creek, Marymos creek, and Duraq creek in the northwest. Ghazlan creek is located between Qabre Nakhoda Island and the eastern shore of the main land.

At the mouth of the bay, there are three islands, Buneh island, Dara Island, and Qabre Nakhoda Island, and there are many uninhabited small islands in the bay.

== Ecosystem ==
The largest distribution of silver pomfret in the Persian Gulf is in Musa bay region and Qeshm Island. Spotted kingfishers are among the birds of the bay, and whales, dolphins, and friales are among the aquatic animals. A large amount of untreated wastewater from petrochemical industries enters Musa bay, threatening the ecosystems and tourism of the bay.

Musa bay is home to animal species including humpback dolphins and sea birds such as flamingos, spoonbills, western reef herons, crab-plovers, greater crested terns, bridled terns, small crabs, mudskippers and all kinds of fish. In Musa bay, there are pristine islands under the management of the Department of Environment and beautiful coastal landscapes. Every year during Nowruz, a cruise ship visits Musa bay.

== Economy ==
About 60 buoys have been deployed to mark the passage of cargo ships and oil tankers, carrying up to 100,000 tons, passing through Musa Bay to enter Imam Khomeini Port. More than 1,816 people of Musa bay bay live from subsistence fishing.

Bandar-e Emam Khomeyni and Bandar-e Mahshahr and Mahshahr Petrochemical Special Economic Zone are located in the north of the bay.

== Events ==
On November 16, 2006, an American destroyer approached the territorial waters of Abu Musa, retreating after being warned by the Iranian Navy. On 2/6/2014, an American ship entered the waters of Iran in order to seize a Panamanian oil tanker near Musa bay.

== Gallery ==
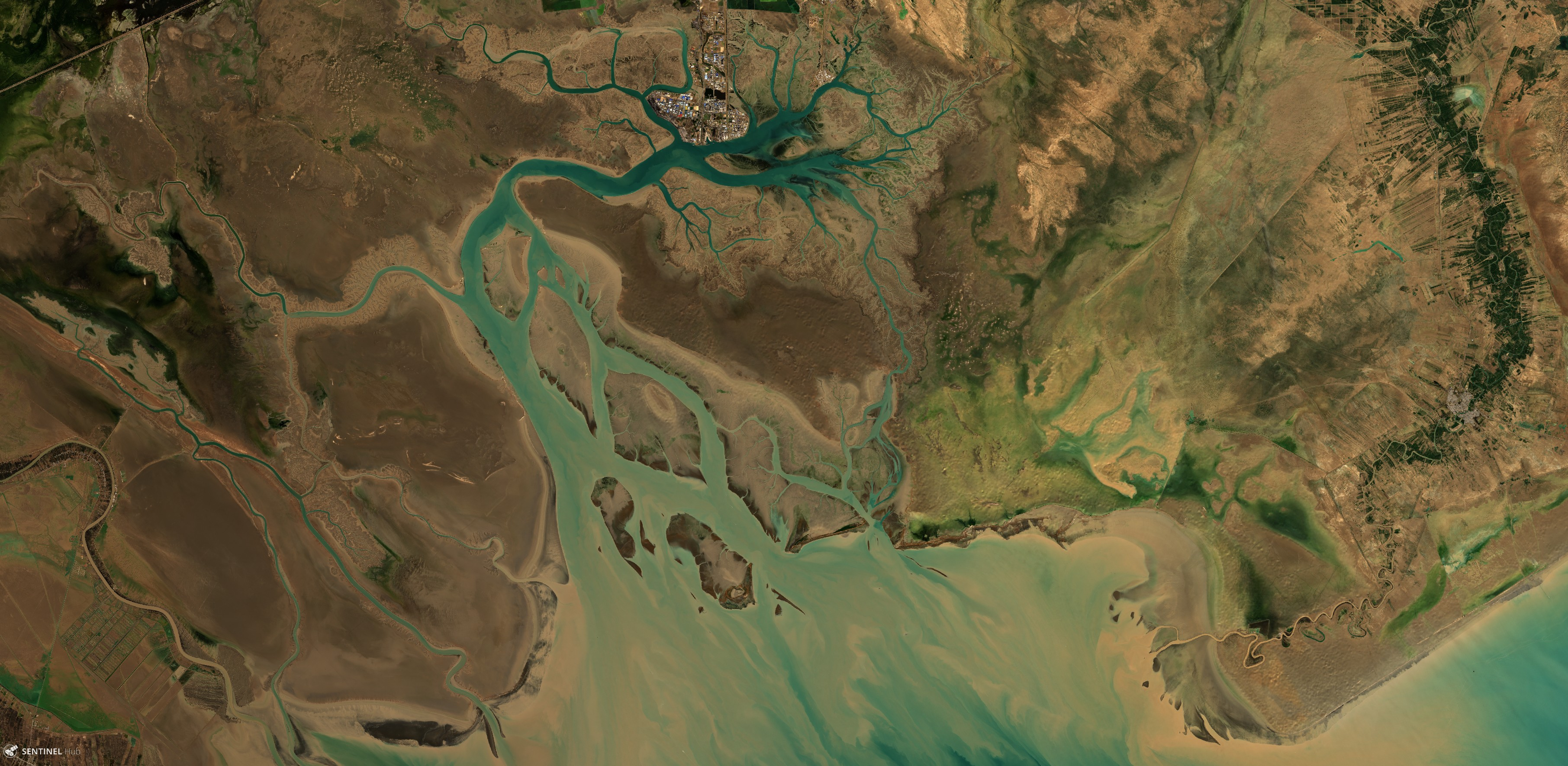
Satellite image of Musa bay.

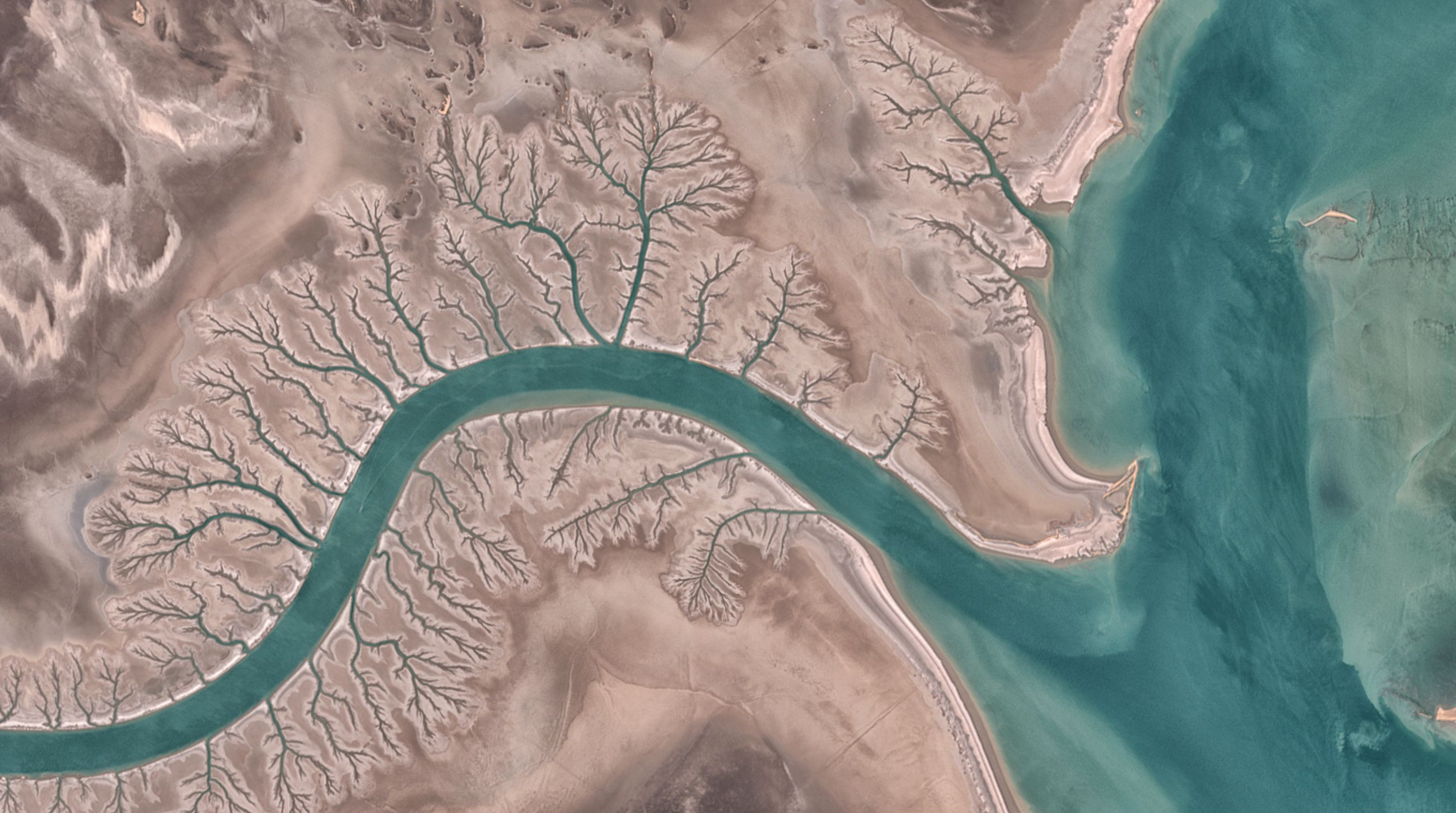
River in Shadegan Wildlife Refuge, Iran 23 May 2017 as seen by Sentinel-2A satellite.

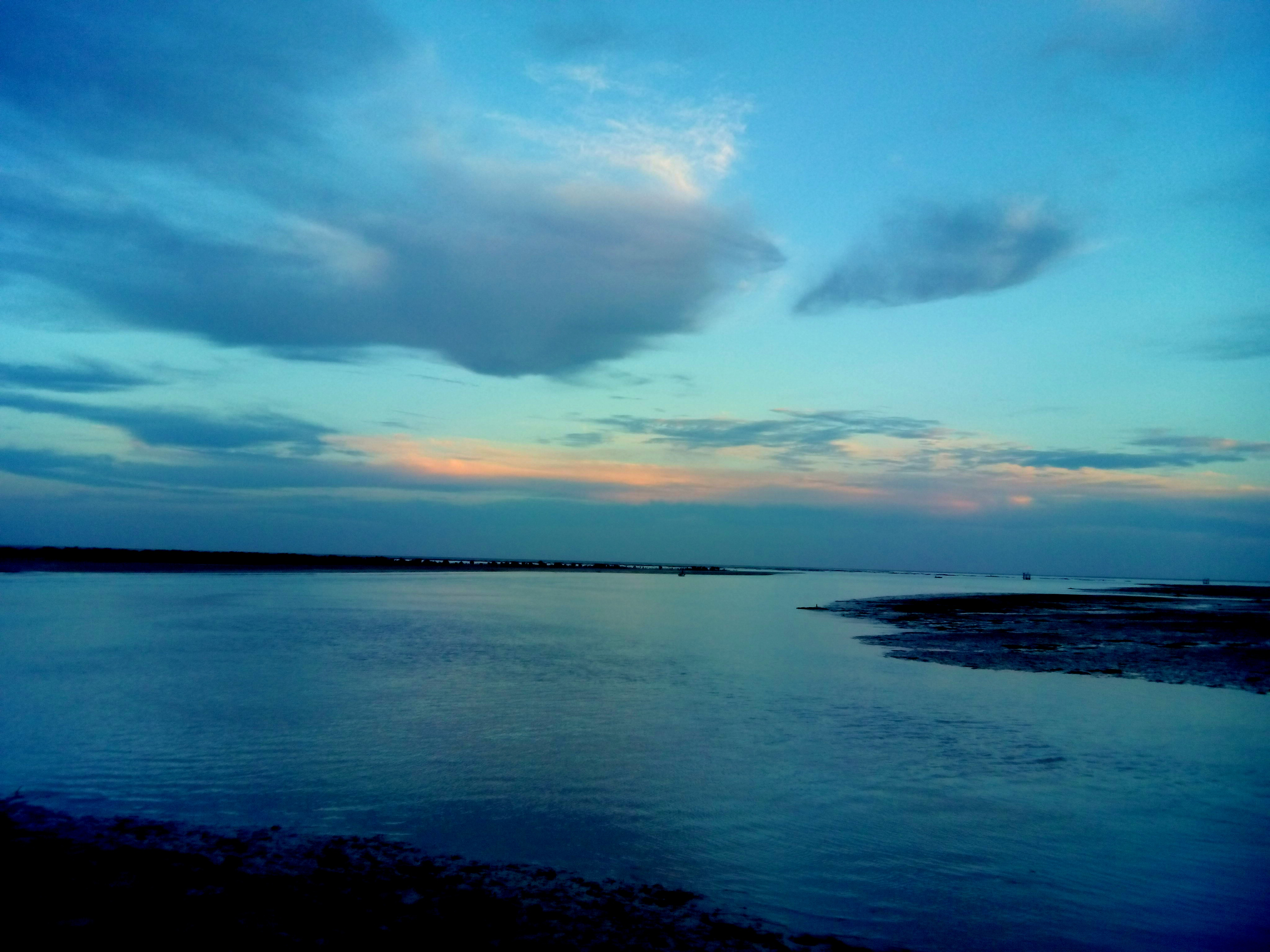
A view of the bay from the ground.
