= Benivar =

Benivar (Persian: بنيوار) may refer to:

- Benivar-e Olya
- Benivar-e Sofla
- Benivar-e Vosta

== See also ==
- Benvar (disambiguation)
