= Cham-e Mahavi =

Cham-e Mahavi چم مهاوي
- Village
- Location within Iran
- Coordinates: 30°45′50″N 49°15′14″E
- Country: Iran
- Province: Khuzestan
- County: Mahshahr
- Bakhsh: Central
- Rural District: Jarahi

Population (2006)
  - Total: 115
- Time zone: UTC+3:30 (IRST)
  - Summer (DST): UTC+4:30 (IRDT)

Cham-e Mahavi (Persian: چم مهاوي, also Romanized as Cham-e Mahāvī and Cham-e Mohāvī, Cham Mahāvī-ye Soflá, Cham Mohāvī-ye Soflá, Chim, and Kem) is a village in Jarahi Rural District, in the Central District of Mahshahr County, Khuzestan Province, Iran. At the 2006 census, its population was 115, in 21 families.
