= Shahrak-e Mamku =

Shahrak-e Memku شهرک بعثت
- Village
- Country: Iran
- Province: Khuzestan
- County: Mahshahr
- Bakhsh: Central
- Rural District: Jarahi

Population (2006)
  - Total: 9,467
- Time zone: UTC+3:30 (IRST)
  - Summer (DST): UTC+4:30 (IRDT)

Shahrak-e Memku (Persian: شهرك ممكو, also Romanized as Shahrak-e Memkū) is a village in Jarahi Rural District, in the Central District of Mahshahr County, Khuzestan Province, Iran. At the 2006 census, its population was 9,467, in 2,552 families.
