= Cham-e Seyyed Latif =

Cham-e Seyyed Latif چم سيدلطيف
- Village
- Location within Iran
- Coordinates: 30°42′39″N 49°09′09″E
- Country: Iran
- Province: Khuzestan
- County: Mahshahr
- Bakhsh: Central
- Rural District: Jarahi

Population (2006)
  - Total: 166
- Time zone: UTC+3:30 (IRST)
  - Summer (DST): UTC+4:30 (IRDT)

Cham-e Seyyed Latif (Persian: چم سيدلطيف, also Romanized as Cham-e Seyyed Laţīf) is a village in Jarahi Rural District, in the Central District of Mahshahr County, Khuzestan Province, Iran. At the 2006 census, its population was 166, in 31 families.
