= Gombazun =

Gombazun گمبزون
- Village
- Location within Iran
- Coordinates: 30°48′04″N 49°17′39″E
- Country: Iran
- Province: Khuzestan
- County: Mahshahr
- Bakhsh: Central
- Rural District: Jarahi

Population (2006)
  - Total: 447
- Time zone: UTC+3:30 (IRST)
  - Summer (DST): UTC+4:30 (IRDT)

Gombazun (Persian: گمبزون, also Romanized as Gombazūn and Gambāzoon; also known as Do Gombazūn, Dow Gombazūn, Gambarān, and Gombazān) is a village in Jarahi Rural District, in the Central District of Mahshahr County, Khuzestan Province, Iran. At the 2006 census, its population was 447, in 83 families.
