= Behesht Shahada =

Behesht Shahada بهشت شهدا
- Village
- Country: Iran
- Province: Khuzestan
- County: Mahshahr
- Bakhsh: Bandar-e Emam Khomeyni
- Rural District: Bandar-e Emam Khomeyni

Population (2006)
  - Total: 27
- Time zone: UTC+3:30 (IRST)
  - Summer (DST): UTC+4:30 (IRDT)

Behesht Shahada (Persian: بهشت شهدا, also Romanized as Behesht Shahadā) is a village in Bandar-e Emam Khomeyni Rural District, Bandar-e Emam Khomeyni District, Mahshahr County, Khuzestan Province, Iran. At the 2006 census, its population was 27, in 4 families.
