= Dab Amir =

Dab Amir دب امير
- Village
- Location within Iran
- Coordinates: 30°46′13″N 48°58′37″E
- Country: Iran
- Province: Khuzestan
- County: Mahshahr
- Bakhsh: Central
- Rural District: Jarahi

Population (2006)
  - Total: 29
- Time zone: UTC+3:30 (IRST)
  - Summer (DST): UTC+4:30 (IRDT)

Dab Amir (Persian: دب امير, also Romanized as Dab Āmīr; also known as Dab ol Amīr and Dūb ol Mīr) is a village in Jarahi Rural District, in the Central District of Mahshahr County, Khuzestan Province, Iran. At the 2006 census, its population was 29, in 5 families.
