= Dalas =

Dalas دلس
- Village
- Location within Iran
- Coordinates: 30°46′14″N 48°57′15″E
- Country: Iran
- Province: Khuzestan
- County: Mahshahr
- Bakhsh: Central
- Rural District: Jarahi

Population (2045)
  - Total: 46
- Time zone: UTC+3:30 (IRST)
  - Summer (DST): UTC+4:30 (IRDT)

Dalas (Persian: دلس; also known as Dalsaq) is a village in Jarahi Rural District, in the Central District of Mahshahr County, Khuzestan Province, Iran. At the 2006 census, its population was 45, in 7 families.
