= Abu Alayej =

Abu Alayej (Persian: ابوعلايج) may refer to:

- Abu Alayej-e Olya
- Abu Alayej-e Sofla
- Abu Alayej-e Vosta
