= Hadid, Iran =

Hadid حديد
- Village
- Location within Iran
- Coordinates: 30°47′54″N 49°17′01″E
- Country: Iran
- Province: Khuzestan
- County: Mahshahr
- Bakhsh: Central
- Rural District: Jarahi

Population (2006)
  - Total: 159
- Time zone: UTC+3:30 (IRST)
  - Summer (DST): UTC+4:30 (IRDT)

Hadid (Persian: حديد, also Romanized as Ḩadīd and Ḩedeyd; also known as Hamayat and Ḩemāyat) is a village in Jarahi Rural District, in the Central District of Mahshahr County, Khuzestan Province, Iran. At the 2006 census, its population was 159, in 33 families.
