= Askaleh-ye Bandar Emam =

Askaleh-ye Bandar Emam اسكله بندرامام
- Village
- Country: Iran
- Province: Khuzestan
- County: Mahshahr
- Bakhsh: Bandar-e Emam Khomeyni
- Rural District: Bandar-e Emam Khomeyni

Population (2006)
  - Total: 8
- Time zone: UTC+3:30 (IRST)
  - Summer (DST): UTC+4:30 (IRDT)

Askaleh-ye Bandar Emam (Persian: اسكله بندرامام, also Romanized as Āsḵaleh-ye Bandar Emām) is a village in Bandar-e Emam Khomeyni Rural District, Bandar-e Emam Khomeyni District, Mahshahr County, Khuzestan Province, Iran. At the 2006 census, its population was 8, in 5 families.
