= Khalafiat =

Khalafiat خلافيات
- Village
- Location within Iran
- Coordinates: 30°39′42″N 49°04′28″E
- Country: Iran
- Province: Khuzestan
- County: Mahshahr
- Bakhsh: Central
- Rural District: Jarahi

Population (2006)
  - Total: 35
- Time zone: UTC+3:30 (IRST)
  - Summer (DST): UTC+4:30 (IRDT)

Khalafiat (Persian: خلافيات, also Romanized as Khalāfīāt, Khalāfeyāt, Khallāfeyāt, and Khallāfīāt; also known as Khalafia) is a village in Jarahi Rural District, in the Central District of Mahshahr County, Khuzestan Province, Iran. At the 2006 census, its population was 35, in 7 families.
