= Saraimeh =

Saraimeh or Saraymeh or Sereymeh or Serimeh or Soreymeh or Sarimeh (Persian: سريمه) may refer to:

- Saraimeh, Mahshahr
- Sarimeh, Shushtar
