= Maksar-e Magatif =

Maksar-e Magatif مكسرمگاطيف
- Village
- Location within Iran
- Coordinates: 30°44′11″N 49°11′38″E
- Country: Iran
- Province: Khuzestan
- County: Mahshahr
- Bakhsh: Central
- Rural District: Jarahi

Population (2006)
  - Total: 432
- Time zone: UTC+3:30 (IRST)
  - Summer (DST): UTC+4:30 (IRDT)

Maksar-e Magatif (Persian: مكسرمگاطيف, also Romanized as Maksar-e Magāṭīf) is a village in Jarahi Rural District, in the Central District of Mahshahr County, Khuzestan Province, Iran. At the 2006 census, its population was 432, in 76 families.
