= Abu Alayej-e Vosta =

Abu Alayej-e Vosta ابوعلايج وسطي
- Village
- Location within Iran
- Coordinates: 30°43′59″N 49°02′02″E
- Country: Iran
- Province: Khuzestan
- County: Mahshahr
- Bakhsh: Central
- Rural District: Jarahi

Population (2006)
  - Total: 58
- Time zone: UTC+3:30 (IRST)
  - Summer (DST): UTC+4:30 (IRDT)

Abu Alayej-e Vosta (Persian: ابوعلايج وسطي, also Romanized as Abū ‘Alāyej-e Vostá; also known as Abū ‘Alā’ej, Albū ‘Alāyej-e Mīānī, and Albū ‘Alāyej-e Vostá) is a village in Jarahi Rural District, in the Central District of Mahshahr County, Khuzestan Province, Iran. At the 2006 census, its population was 58, in 11 families.
