= Magtu =

Magtu (Persian: مگطوع or مگتوع) may refer to:

- Magtu, Ahvaz
- Magtu, Karun

== See also ==
- Maqtu (disambiguation)
