= Hariyeh, Mahshahr =

Hariyeh حريه
- Village
- Location within Iran
- Coordinates: 30°46′42″N 49°15′25″E
- Country: Iran
- Province: Khuzestan
- County: Mahshahr
- Bakhsh: Central
- Rural District: Jarahi

Population (2006)
  - Total: 56
- Time zone: UTC+3:30 (IRST)
  - Summer (DST): UTC+4:30 (IRDT)

Hariyeh (Persian: حريه, also Romanized as Ḩarīyeh, Heriah, and Horrīyeh; also known as Ḩorrīyeh-ye Bozorg) is a village in Jarahi Rural District, in the Central District of Mahshahr County, Khuzestan Province, Iran. At the 2006 census, its population was 56, in 12 families.
