= Abu Alayej-e Olya =

Abu Alayej-e Olya ابوعلايج عليا
- Village
- Location within Iran
- Coordinates: 30°43′43″N 49°02′29″E
- Country: Iran
- Province: Khuzestan
- County: Mahshahr
- Bakhsh: Central
- Rural District: Jarahi

Population (2006)
  - Total: 363
- Time zone: UTC+3:30 (IRST)
  - Summer (DST): UTC+4:30 (IRDT)

Abu Alayej-e Olya (Persian: ابوعلايج عليا, also Romanized as Abū ‘Alāyej-e ‘Olyā; also known as Albū ‘Alāyej-e Bālā and Albū ‘Alāyej-e ‘Olyā) is a village in Jarahi Rural District, in the Central District of Mahshahr County, Khuzestan Province, Iran. As of the 2006 census, its population was 363, in 61 families.
