= Hadameh-ye Vosta =

Hadameh-ye Vosta هدامه وسطي
- Village
- Location within Iran
- Coordinates: 30°44′29″N 49°12′09″E
- Country: Iran
- Province: Khuzestan
- County: Mahshahr
- Bakhsh: Central
- Rural District: Jarahi

Population (2006)
  - Total: 37
- Time zone: UTC+3:30 (IRST)
  - Summer (DST): UTC+4:30 (IRDT)

Hadameh-ye Vosta (Persian: هدامه وسطي, also Romanized as Hadāmeh-ye Vosţá and Ḩaddāmeh-ye Vosţá; also known as Hadāmeh-ye Mīānī, Ḩaddāmeh, Haddāmeh-ye Dovom, Ḩaddāmeh-ye Soflá, and Haddāmeh-ye Yakom) is a village in Jarahi Rural District, in the Central District of Mahshahr County, Khuzestan Province, Iran. At the 2006 census, its population was 37, in 7 families.
