= Hashcheh-ye Makineh =

Hashcheh-ye Makineh هشچه مكينه
- Village
- Location within Iran
- Coordinates: 30°43′34″N 49°10′33″E
- Country: Iran
- Province: Khuzestan
- County: Mahshahr
- Bakhsh: Central
- Rural District: Jarahi

Population (2006)
  - Total: 387
- Time zone: UTC+3:30 (IRST)
  - Summer (DST): UTC+4:30 (IRDT)

Hashcheh-ye Makineh (Persian: هشچه مكينه, also Romanized as Hashcheh-ye Makīneh) is a village in Jarahi Rural District, in the Central District of Mahshahr County, Khuzestan Province, Iran. At the 2006 census, its population was 387, in 76 families.
