= Maqtu-e Sofla =

Maqtu-e Sofla مقطوع سفلي
- Village
- Location within Iran
- Coordinates: 30°42′24″N 49°06′04″E
- Country: Iran
- Province: Khuzestan
- County: Mahshahr
- Bakhsh: Central
- Rural District: Jarahi

Population (2006)
  - Total: 238
- Time zone: UTC+3:30 (IRST)
  - Summer (DST): UTC+4:30 (IRDT)

Maqtu-e Sofla (Persian: مقطوع سفلي, also Romanized as Maqţū‘-e Soflá; also known as Maqţū‘-e Pā’īn) is a village in Jarahi Rural District, in the Central District of Mahshahr County, Khuzestan Province, Iran. At the 2006 census, its population was 238, in 52 families.
