= Sadeyreh =

Sadeyreh (Persian: سديره) may refer to:

- Sadeyreh-ye Olya
- Sadeyreh-ye Sofla
