= Shahrak-e Hamzeh =

Shahrak-e Hamzeh (Persian: شهرك حمزه) may refer to:

- Shahrak-e Hamzeh, Ilam
- Shahrak-e Hamzeh, Choghamish, Dezful County, Khuzestan Province
- Shahrak-e Hamzeh, Sardasht, Dezful County, Khuzestan Province

== See also ==
- Hamzeh (disambiguation)
