= Horriyeh =

Horriyeh or Hariyeh or Heriah (Persian: حريه) may refer to:

- Horriyeh, Ahvaz
- Hariyeh, Mahshahr
