= Hadameh =

Hadameh or Haddameh (Persian: هدامه) may refer to:

- Hadameh-ye Olya
- Hadameh-ye Vosta
