= Saraimeh, Mahshahr =

Saraimeh سريمه
- Village
- Location within Iran
- Coordinates: 30°43′56″N 49°01′55″E
- Country: Iran
- Province: Khuzestan
- County: Mahshahr
- Bakhsh: Central
- Rural District: Jarahi

Population (2006)
  - Total: 125
- Time zone: UTC+3:30 (IRST)
  - Summer (DST): UTC+4:30 (IRDT)

Saraimeh (Persian: سريمه, also Romanized as Saraīmeh, Sarāymeh, Sereymeh, Şerīmeh, and Soreymeh; also known as Seraimā and Serīmeh-ye Soflá) is a village in Jarahi Rural District, in the Central District of Mahshahr County, Khuzestan Province, Iran. At the 2006 census, its population was 125, in 25 families.
