= Hamzeh-ye Olya =

Hamzeh-ye Olya خمزه عليا
- Village
- Location within Iran
- Coordinates: 30°42′39″N 49°04′47″E
- Country: Iran
- Province: Khuzestan
- County: Mahshahr
- Bakhsh: Central
- Rural District: Jarahi

Population (2006)
  - Total: 60
- Time zone: UTC+3:30 (IRST)
  - Summer (DST): UTC+4:30 (IRDT)

Hamzeh-ye Olya (Persian: خمزه عليا, also Romanized as Ḩamzeh-ye ‘Olyā; also known as Khamzeh-ye Bālā) is a village in Jarahi Rural District, in the Central District of Mahshahr County, Khuzestan Province, Iran. As of the 2006 census, its population was 60, in 12 families.
