= Tekheyt =

Tekheyt (Persian: تخيط) may refer to:

- Tekheyt-e Olya, a village in Jarahi Rural District, Khuzestan Province, Iran
- Tekheyt-e Sofla, another village in Jarahi Rural District, Khuzestan Province, Iran
