= Maksar-e Sofla =

Maksar-e Sofla مكسرسفلي
- Village
- Location within Iran
- Coordinates: 30°44′10″N 49°11′43″E
- Country: Iran
- Province: Khuzestan
- County: Mahshahr
- Bakhsh: Central
- Rural District: Jarahi

Population (2006)
  - Total: 119
- Time zone: UTC+3:30 (IRST)
  - Summer (DST): UTC+4:30 (IRDT)

Maksar-e Sofla (Persian: مكسرسفلي, also Romanized as Maksar-e Soflá; also known as Magsar, Magsar-e Soflá, and Maksar-e Pā’īn) is a village in Jarahi Rural District, in the Central District of Mahshahr County, Khuzestan Province, Iran. At the 2006 census, its population was 119, in 19 families.
