= Hadameh-ye Olya =

Hadameh-ye Olya هدامه عليا
- Village
- Location within Iran
- Coordinates: 30°44′34″N 49°12′48″E
- Country: Iran
- Province: Khuzestan
- County: Mahshahr
- Bakhsh: Central
- Rural District: Jarahi

Population (2006)
  - Total: 178
- Time zone: UTC+3:30 (IRST)
  - Summer (DST): UTC+4:30 (IRDT)

Hadameh-ye Olya (Persian: هدامه عليا, also Romanized as Ḩadāmeh-ye ‘Olyā) is a village in Jarahi Rural District, in the Central District of Mahshahr County, Khuzestan Province, Iran. At the 2006 census, its population was 178, in 27 families.
