= Shahrak-e Vali-ye Asr, Khuzestan =

Village in Khuzestan province, Iran

Shahrak-e Vali-ye Asr Persian: شهرك ولي عصر
- Village
- Location within Iran
- Coordinates: 30°32′13″N 49°05′23″E
- Country: Iran
- Province: Khuzestan
- County: Bandar Mahshahr
- District: Bandar-e Emam Khomeyni
- Rural District: Bandar-e Emam Khomeyni

Population (2016)
  - Total: 728
- Time zone: UTC+3:30 (IRST)

Shahrak-e Vali-ye Asr (Persian: شهرك ولي عصر) (Note: Also romanized as Shahrak-e Valī-ye ‘Aşr; also known as Mey Gholāmak) is a village in Bandar-e Emam Khomeyni Rural District of Bandar-e Emam Khomeyni District, Bandar Mahshahr County, Khuzestan province, Iran.

== Demographics ==
=== Population ===
At the time of the 2006 National Census, the village's population was 862 in 179 households. The following census in 2011 counted 909 people in 218 households. The 2016 census measured the population of the village as 728 people in 199 households. It was the most populous village in its rural district.
