= Hamzeh-ye Sofla =

Hamzeh-ye Sofla خمزه سفلي
- Village
- Location within Iran
- Coordinates: 30°43′04″N 49°03′24″E
- Country: Iran
- Province: Khuzestan
- County: Mahshahr
- Bakhsh: Central
- Rural District: Jarahi

Population (2006)
  - Total: 160
- Time zone: UTC+3:30 (IRST)
  - Summer (DST): UTC+4:30 (IRDT)

Hamzeh-ye Sofla (Persian: خمزه سفلي, also Romanized as Ḩamzeh-ye Soflá; also known as Khamzeh-ye Pā’īn) is a village in Jarahi Rural District, in the Central District of Mahshahr County, Khuzestan Province, Iran. At the 2006 census, its population was 160, in 31 families.
