= Abu Alayej-e Sofla =

Abu Alayej-e Sofla ابوعلايج سفلي
- Village
- Location within Iran
- Coordinates: 30°44′42″N 49°00′57″E
- Country: Iran
- Province: Khuzestan
- County: Mahshahr
- Bakhsh: Central
- Rural District: Jarahi

Population (2006)
  - Total: 197
- Time zone: UTC+3:30 (IRST)
  - Summer (DST): UTC+4:30 (IRDT)

Abu Alayej-e Sofla (Persian: ابوعلايج سفلي, also Romanized as Abū ‘Alāyej-e Soflá; also known as Albū ‘Alāyej-e Pā’īn and Albū ‘Alāyej-e Soflá) is a village in Jarahi Rural District, in the Central District of Mahshahr County, Khuzestan Province, Iran. At the 2006 census, its population was 197, in 42 families.
