= Tekheyt-e Olya =

Tekheyt-e Olya تخيطعليا
- Village
- Location within Iran
- Coordinates: 30°42′29″N 49°05′57″E
- Country: Iran
- Province: Khuzestan
- County: Mahshahr
- Bakhsh: Central
- Rural District: Jarahi

Population (2006)
  - Total: 32
- Time zone: UTC+3:30 (IRST)
  - Summer (DST): UTC+4:30 (IRDT)

Tekheyt-e Olya (Persian: تخيطعليا, also Romanized as Tekheyţ-e ‘Olyā and Tekheyt-e ‘Olyā; also known as Tachayat, Takheyt, Tekheyţ-e Bālā, Tokhīţ, Tūkhīt, Tūkhīţ-e ‘Olyā, and Tūkhīţ-e Soflá) is a village in Jarahi Rural District, in the Central District of Mahshahr County, Khuzestan Province, Iran. At the 2006 census, its population was 32, in 7 families.
