= Maksar-e Vosta =

Maksar-e Vosta مكسروسطي
- Village
- Location within Iran
- Coordinates: 30°44′44″N 49°13′02″E
- Country: Iran
- Province: Khuzestan
- County: Mahshahr
- Bakhsh: Central
- Rural District: Jarahi

Population (2006)
  - Total: 115
- Time zone: UTC+3:30 (IRST)
  - Summer (DST): UTC+4:30 (IRDT)

Maksar-e Vosta (Persian: مكسروسطي, also Romanized as Maksar-e Vostá; also known as Maksar-e Mīānī) is a village in Jarahi Rural District, in the Central District of Mahshahr County, Khuzestan Province, Iran. At the 2006 census, its population was 115, in 20 families.
