= Tekheyt-e Sofla =

Tekheyt-e Sofla تخيطسفلي
- Village
- Location within Iran
- Coordinates: 30°42′37″N 49°05′23″E
- Country: Iran
- Province: Khuzestan
- County: Mahshahr
- Bakhsh: Central
- Rural District: Jarahi

Population (2006)
  - Total: 78
- Time zone: UTC+3:30 (IRST)
  - Summer (DST): UTC+4:30 (IRDT)

Tekheyt-e Sofla (Persian: تخيطسفلي, also Romanized as Tekheyt-e Soflá; also known as Tekheyţ-e Pā’īn and Tokīt) is a village in Jarahi Rural District, in the Central District of Mahshahr County, Khuzestan Province, Iran. At the 2006 census, its population was 78, in 16 families.
