= Maqtu-e Vosta =

Maqtu-e Vosta مقطوع وسطي
- Village
- Location within Iran
- Coordinates: 30°42′15″N 49°06′31″E
- Country: Iran
- Province: Khuzestan
- County: Mahshahr
- Bakhsh: Central
- Rural District: Jarahi

Population (2006)
  - Total: 45
- Time zone: UTC+3:30 (IRST)
  - Summer (DST): UTC+4:30 (IRDT)

Maqtu-e Vosta (Persian: مقطوع وسطي, also Romanized as Maqţū‘-e Vostá; also known as Maqţū‘-e Mīānī) is a village in Jarahi Rural District, in the Central District of Mahshahr County, Khuzestan Province, Iran. At the 2006 census, its population was 45, in 8 families.
