= Shahrak-e Ayatollah Madani =

Village in Khuzestan province, Iran

Shahrak-e Ayatollah Madani Persian: شهرك ايت الله مدني
- Village
- Location within Iran
- Coordinates: 30°32′48″N 49°15′36″E
- Country: Iran
- Province: Khuzestan
- County: Bandar Mahshahr
- District: Central
- Rural District: Jarahi

Population (2016)
  - Total: 6,089
- Time zone: UTC+3:30 (IRST)

Shahrak-e Ayatollah Madani (Persian: شهرك ايت الله مدني) (Note: Also romanized as Shahrak-e Āyatollah Madanī) is a village in Jarahi Rural District of the Central District of Bandar Mahshahr County, Khuzestan province, Iran.

== Demographics ==
=== Population ===
At the time of the 2006 National Census, the village's population was 4,295 in 901 households. The following census in 2011 counted 6,214 people in 1,504 households. The 2016 census measured the population of the village as 6,089 people in 1,517 households. It was the most populous village in its rural district.
