= Maqtu-e Olya =

Maqtu-e Olya مقطوع عليا
- Village
- Location within Iran
- Coordinates: 30°42′24″N 49°07′16″E
- Country: Iran
- Province: Khuzestan
- County: Mahshahr
- Bakhsh: Central
- Rural District: Jarahi

Population (2006)
  - Total: 685
- Time zone: UTC+3:30 (IRST)
  - Summer (DST): UTC+4:30 (IRDT)

Maqtu-e Olya (Persian: مقطوع عليا, also Romanized as Maqţu‘-e ‘Olyā, and Maqţū‘-e ‘Olyā; also known as Maqţū‘ and Maqţu‘-e Bālā) is a village in Jarahi Rural District, in the Central District of Mahshahr County, Khuzestan Province, Iran. At the 2006 census, its population was 685, in 139 families.
