= Bushehri =

Bushehri is a Persian surname. People with the surname include:

- Gholam Ali Safai Bushehri (born 1959), Iranian cleric
- Habib Meftah Bushehri (born 1978), Iranian musician
- Hashem Hosseini Bushehri (born 1956), Iranian cleric
- Javad Bushehri (1893–1972), Iranian businessman and statesman
- Jenan Bushehri (born 1974), Kuwaiti politician
