= Surin, Iran (disambiguation) =

Surin, Iran is a village in Kurdistan Province, Iran.

Surin, Iran (Persian: سورين) may refer to:

- Soveyreh, Khuzestan Province
- Sadeyreh-ye Olya, Khuzestan Province
- Sadeyreh-ye Sofla, Khuzestan Province
