= Hashcheh-ye Sofla =

Village in Khuzestan province, Iran

Hashcheh-ye Sofla Persian: هشچه سفلي
- Village
- Location within Iran
- Coordinates: 30°42′47″N 49°07′38″E
- Country: Iran
- Province: Khuzestan
- County: Bandar Mahshahr
- District: Central
- Rural District: Jarahi

Population (2016)
  - Total: 958
- Time zone: UTC+3:30 (IRST)

Hashcheh-ye Sofla (Persian: هشچه سفلي) (Note: Also romanized as Ḩashcheh-ye Soflá, Hashcheh-ye Soflá; also known as Ḩashcheh, Ḩashcheh-ye Pā’īn, Hashjeh-ye Soflá, Ḩaskeh, and Hastcha) is a village in, and the capital of, Jarahi Rural District of the Central District of Mahshahr County, Khuzestan province, Iran.

== Demographics ==
=== Population ===
At the time of the 2006 National Census, the village's population was 784 in 150 households. The following census in 2011 counted 893 people in 194 households. The 2016 census measured the population of the village as 958 people in 225 households.
