= Hashem Hosseini Bushehri =

Iranian Ayatollah

Ayatollah Seyyed Hashem Hosseini Bushehri
- هاشم حسینی بوشهری
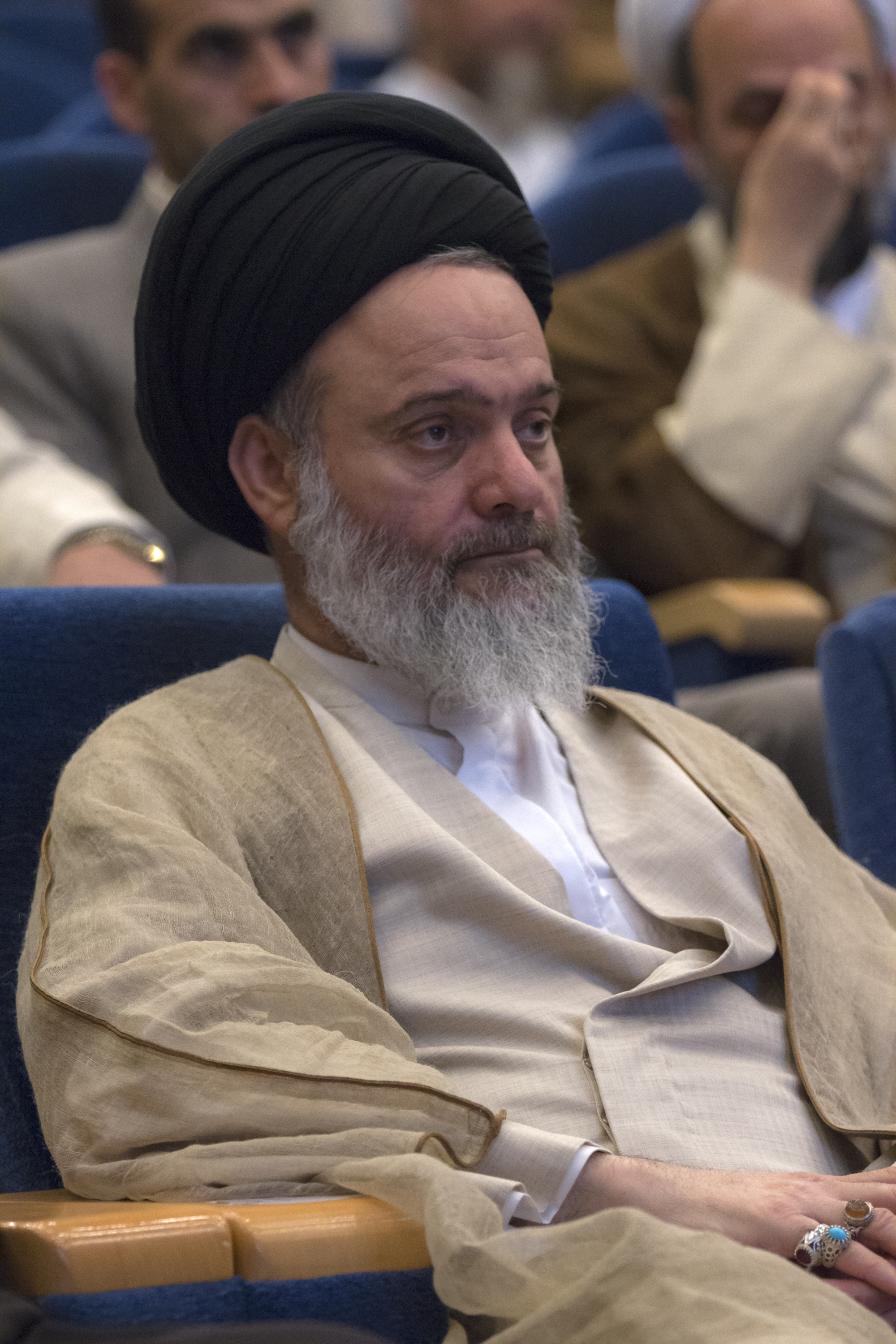
- Bushehri in 2014

Member of Assembly of Experts
- Constituency: Bushehr Province

Personal details
- Born: 1956 (age 69–70) Bushehr, Iran
- Party: Iranian principlists
- Education: Qom Seminary

Hashem Hosseini Bushehri (born 1956; Persian: هاشم حسینی بوشهری) is an Iranian Twelver Shia cleric. Born in Bandar-e Deyr, Bushehr province, Bushehri is the representative of Bushehr province in the Assembly of Experts. He is also the Temporary Imam of Friday Prayer in Qom. Member of the Strategic Think Room of the Assembly of Experts of the Leadership.

== Life ==
Seyyed Hashem Hosseini Bushehri was born in Bordkhun, locating around Bandar-e Deyr in Bushehr province. His father was a cleric and farmer. His mother was the daughter of an Islamic Shia scholar. Hosseini Bushehri went to Hawzah after passing his elementary school. He began his seminary education at the Hawzah-school of Bushehr, and then went to Qom Seminary. He is a maternal descendant of Sheikh Abdul-Nabi al-Bahrani.

== Teachers ==
Hosseini Bushehri studied under teachers and scholars including:

- Mohammad-Reza Golpaygani
- Mohammad Fazel Lankarani
- Jawad Tabrizi
- Mirza Hashem Amoli
- Naser Makarem Shirazi
- Hossein Wahid Khorasani
- Hassan Hassanzadeh Amoli
- Mohammad Taqi Sotudeh
- Mirza Mohsen Duzduzani
- Ahmad Payani
- Yahya Ansari Shirazi

== Works ==
Among the works of Hosseini Bushehri are:

- Vice-Chairman of the Board of Trustees of Al-Mustafa International University, appointed by Seyyed Ali Khamenei
- Al-Qavaeed Al-Feqhieh Fi Feqhe Al-Imamieh
- Adab Nameye Parsayan
- Hadise Iman
- Sharhi Bar Ketabe Ijtehad Va Taqlide Orvatol Vosqa
- Sharhe Arabi Bar Ketabe Osule Feqh
- Taqrirate Doruse Feqh Va Osul

== See also ==
- Gholam Ali Safai Bushehri
