= Buneh =

Island in Khuzestan, Iran

جزیره بونه
- Location within Iran
- Interactive map of Buneh

Geography
- Location: Persian Gulf
- Coordinates: 30.1409°N 49.16755°E
- Area: 250 ha (620 acres)
- Highest elevation: 2 m (7 ft)

Administration
- Iran
- Province: Khuzestan

Buneh (Persian: جزیره بونه, romanized: Jazīreh-ye Būneh) is a low-lying island in the Khuzestan province of Iran.

== Location and geography ==
Buneh Island is located in the far north of the Persian Gulf, at the mouth of Musa Bay, and is one of the four major islands in the estuary Hvor e-Musi. Nearby islands include Dara Island and Qabr-e Nakhoda Island.

The island has an area of 2.5 km^{2} (1.0 sq mi) and from the mainland to the east is 3 km (2 mi) away. Buneh extending a length of 7 km (4 mi) in an east–west, and the maximum altitude is 2 m (6 ft 7 in) above sea level
