= Hashcheh-ye Olya =

Hashcheh-ye Olya هشچه عليا
- Village
- Location within Iran
- Coordinates: 30°42′59″N 49°09′52″E
- Country: Iran
- Province: Khuzestan
- County: Mahshahr
- Bakhsh: Central
- Rural District: Jarahi

Population (2006)
  - Total: 220
- Time zone: UTC+3:30 (IRST)
  - Summer (DST): UTC+4:30 (IRDT)

Hashcheh-ye Olya (Persian: هشچه عليا, also Romanized as Ḩashcheh-ye ‘Olyā and Hashcheh-ye ‘Olyā; also known as Haitcha, Ḩashcheh, Ḩashcheh-ye Bālā, Hashcheh-ye Dovvom, Hashjeh-ye ‘Olyā, and Soveyreh-ye ‘Olyā) is a village in Jarahi Rural District, in the Central District of Mahshahr County, Khuzestan Province, Iran. At the 2006 census, its population was 220, in 39 families.
