= Benivar-e Olya =

Benivar-e Olya بنيوارعليا
- Village
- Location within Iran
- Coordinates: 30°46′25″N 49°15′46″E
- Country: Iran
- Province: Khuzestan
- County: Mahshahr
- Bakhsh: Central
- Rural District: Jarahi

Population (2006)
  - Total: 109
- Time zone: UTC+3:30 (IRST)
  - Summer (DST): UTC+4:30 (IRDT)

Benivar-e Olya (Persian: بنيوارعليا, also Romanized as Benīvār-e ‘Olyā; and also known as Benvār, Benvār-e Bālā, Benvār-e ‘Olyā, Bonvār-e Bālā, Bonvār-e ‘Olyā, Bonvar-e ‘Olyā, and Buniwar) is a village in Jarahi Rural District, in the Central District of Mahshahr County, Khuzestan Province, Iran. At the 2006 census, its population was 109, in 23 families.
