= Maksar-e Olya =

Maksar-e Olya مكسرعليا
- Village
- Location within Iran
- Coordinates: 30°45′22″N 49°13′44″E
- Country: Iran
- Province: Khuzestan
- County: Mahshahr
- Bakhsh: Central
- Rural District: Jarahi

Population (2006)
  - Total: 165
- Time zone: UTC+3:30 (IRST)
  - Summer (DST): UTC+4:30 (IRDT)

Maksar-e Olya (Persian: مكسرعليا, also Romanized as Maksar-e ‘Olyā and Moksar-e ‘Olyā; also known as Benvār-e Kūchek, Magsar, Magsar-e ‘Olyā, Maksar, Maksar-e Bālā, Mesgar, and Muksar) is a village in Jarahi Rural District, in the Central District of Mahshahr County, Khuzestan Province, Iran. At the 2006 census, its population was 165, in 41 families.
