= Benivar-e Vosta =

Benivar-e Vosta بنيواروسطي
- Village
- Location within Iran
- Coordinates: 30°46′11″N 49°15′12″E
- Country: Iran
- Province: Khuzestan
- County: Mahshahr
- Bakhsh: Central
- Rural District: Jarahi

Population (2006)
  - Total: 50
- Time zone: UTC+3:30 (IRST)
  - Summer (DST): UTC+4:30 (IRDT)

Benivar-e Vosta (Persian: بنيواروسطي, also Romanized as Benīvār-e Vostá; also known as Benvār-e Vostá and Bonvār-e Vostá) is a village in Jarahi Rural District, in the Central District of Mahshahr County, Khuzestan Province, Iran. At the 2006 census, its population was 50, in 10 families.
