= Benivar-e Sofla =

Benivar-e Sofla بنيوارسفلي
- Village
- Location within Iran
- Coordinates: 30°45′05″N 49°13′45″E
- Country: Iran
- Province: Khuzestan
- County: Mahshahr
- Bakhsh: Central
- Rural District: Jarahi

Population (2006)
  - Total: 271
- Time zone: UTC+3:30 (IRST)
  - Summer (DST): UTC+4:30 (IRDT)

Benivar-e Sofla (Persian: بنيوارسفلي, also Romanized as Benīvār-e Soflá; also known as Benvār-e Soflá, Bonvār-e Pā’īn, and Bonvār-e Soflá) is a village in Jarahi Rural District, in the Central District of Mahshahr County, Khuzestan Province, Iran. At the 2006 census, its population was 271, in 50 families.
