= Surin =

Surin may refer to:

== Places ==
- Surin, Deux-Sèvres, commune in France
- Surin, Vienne, commune in France
- Surin, Iran (disambiguation), places in Iran
- Surin province, Thailand
  - Surin, Thailand, capital of the Province and district
  - Surin Airport, Thailand
  - Mueang Surin district, the capital district of Surin Province
- Surin Beach, one of the main beaches of Phuket, Thailand
- Surin Islands, an archipelago in the Andaman Sea belonging to Thailand

== People ==
- Jean-Joseph Surin (1600–1665), French Jesuit mystic, preacher, devotional writer and exorcist
- Surin Pitsuwan (1949–2017), Thai politician
- Bruny Surin (born 1967), Canadian athlete
- Igor Surin (born 1974), former Russian professional footballer
- Masira Surin (born 1981), Indian field hockey player
- Aleksandr Surin, Russian filmmaker, directed the 1999 film Flowers from the Victors based on Three Comrades
- Surin (Nestorian patriarch), Iranian aristocrat
- Yegor Surin (born 2006), Russian ice hockey player

== Other uses ==
- Surin (grape), another name for the French wine grape Sauvignon blanc
