= Chamran, Iran =

City in Khuzestan province, Iran

Chamran Persian: چمران
- City
- Location within Iran
- Coordinates: 30°42′22″N 49°09′44″E
- Country: Iran
- Province: Khuzestan
- County: Bandar Mahshahr
- District: Central

Population (2016)
  - Total: 33,505
- Time zone: UTC+3:30 (IRST)

Chamran (Persian: چمران) (Note: Also romanized as Chamrān) is a city in the Central District of Bandar Mahshahr County, Khuzestan province, Iran.

== Demographics ==
=== Population ===
At the time of the 2006 National Census, the city's population was 18,519 in 3,935 households. The following census in 2011 counted 31,138 people in 8,123 households. The 2016 census measured the population of the city as 33,505 people in 9,025 households.
