= Ibn al-Sharif Dartarkhwan al-Adhili =

Muslim poet

Ali ibn Muhammad ibn al-Ridha ibn Muhammad al-Husayni al-Musawi al-Tusi
- Born: 589 AH/1193 CE; Ḥamāh, Syria
- Died: 655 AH/1257 CE
- Occupation: Poet
- Notable work: Alf jāriyah wa-jāriyah

ʽAlī ibn Muḥammad ibn al-Riḍā ibn Muḥammad al-Ḥusaynī al-Musāwī al-Ṭūsī, also known as Ibn al-Sharīf Dartarkhwān al-ʽĀdhilī (b. 589 AH/1193 CE in Ḥamāh, Syria; d. 655 AH/1257 CE), was a poet. He is noted as the author of the Alf jāriyah wa-jāriyah ('one thousand and one slave-women'), which survives in one manuscript of 255 folios, now in the Austrian National Library. The work seems to have been a sequel to the same author's Alf ghulām wa-ghulām ('one thousand and one male slaves'), now lost; Alf jāriyah wa-jāriyah comprises eight chapters of short poems in the epigrammatic form known as maqṭūʽ (pl. maqāṭīʽ).

chapter	number of epigrams	subject matter
1	250	
2	50	
3	100	name-riddles
4	100	
5	100	
6	211	women from different cities
7	45	
8	145	

== Examples ==
The following examples come from the sixth chapter of Alf jāriyah wa-jāriyah, in which each three-verse epigram celebrates the women of a different city of the Islamic world. This example is in the sarīʿ metre:

wa-qāla fi jāriayatin miknāsata
iqṭaʿ ilā wahrāna fī ṭāʾirin yasbahu fī l-māʾi bilā rūḥī
laylan ʿalā laylin wa-min baʿdihā qudda l-malā bi-l-ḍummari l-fiḥī
fa-lī bi-miknāsata khawdun ḥashat qalbī l-muʿannā bi-tabārīḥī

Translation:

And he referred to a girl from Meknès:
Cross (the sea) to Oran on a bird that swims in the water without life
night after night, and after it (i.e. Oran) traverse the deserts on large and slender camels!
For at Meknès I have a lovely girl who has filled my tortured heart with passionate desires.

This is in the wāfir metre:

wa-qāla fi jāriayatin min ishbīliyata
hajartu bi-ṭūsa min ahlī ʿadīdan bi-andalusīyatin jaydāʿ a ghaydā
bi-ishbīlīyatin sanaḥat mahātan taṣīdu bi-laḥẓihā l-ḍirghāma ṣaydā
janā l-zaytūna wa-l-zarjūna fihā jamālan ṣāra li-l-jawwābi qaydā

Translation:

And he referred to a girl from Sevilla:
I left, at Ṭūs, a great number of my people, because of a long-necked, supple Andalusian girl!
A Sevillian who appeared as a wild cow that hunts down the lion by her looks
— he had been collecting olives and grapes there — by virtue of (her) beauty that has turned into shackles for the traveller.

== Editions and translations ==
No edition of the whole work exists, but editions and translations of numerous poems or sections have been published by Jürgen W. Weil. The most prominent publication is his Mädchennamen — verrätselt. Hundert Rätsel-epigramme aus dem adab-Werk Alf ǧāriya wa-ǧāria (7./13.Jh.), Islamkundliche Untersuchungen, 85 (Berlin: Klaus-Schwarz-Verlag, 1984), ISBN 392296835X, which published chapter 3 of the work in transliterated Arabic and in German translation. Other editions and translations include:

- Weil, J. W. and A. A. Ambros, 'Tausend und ein Mädchen: aus den Schätzen der österreichischen Nationalbibliothek', Bustan, 4 (1969), 22-28
- Weil, J. W., 'Einige Rätsel aus der arabischen schönen Literatur', Bustan, 2-3 (1970), 47–49.
- Weil, J. W., 'Epigramme auf Musikerinnen (in den letzten zwei Teilen: Künsterinnen in der Gedichtsammlung Alf ǧāriya wa ǧāriya', Rooznik Orientalistyczny, 37, pp. 9–12; 39, pp. 137–41; 40, pp. 83–93.
- Weil, Jürgen W, 'Einige Edelmetalle und Edelsteine als Rätsel-namen in der Gedichtsammlung Alf ǧāriya wa-ǧāriya', Wiener Zeitschrift für die Kunde des Morgenlandes, 65-66 (1973–74), 151–54.
- Weil, Jürgen W., 'Einige Rätsel aus dem adab-Werk Alf ǧāriya wa-ǧāriya', Der Islam: Zeitschrift für Geschichte und Kultur des Islamischen Orients, 55 (1978), 99–101.
- Weil, J. W., and A. A. Ambros, '22 Rätsel-Epigramme aus der Gedichtsammlung Alf ǧāriya wa-ǧāriya', Orientalia hispanica: Festschrift F. M. Pareja, vol. 1, pp. 20–32.
- Weil, J. W., 'Alf ǧāriya wa-ǧāriya, sechstes Kapitel: Epigramme auf Mädchen aus Orten der muslimischen Geographie' parts 1 and 2 in Islam, part 3 in Rocznik Orientalistyczny.
- Jürgen W. Weil, 'Epigramme auf Künstlerinnen in der Gedichtsammlung Alf ǧāriya wa-ǧāriya (Teil II)', Rocznik orientalistyczny, 39, 137–41.
- Jürgen W. Weil, 'Mädchen aus der muslimischen Geographie Wortspiele mit Ortsnamen in einem adab-Werk des 13. Jahrhunderts', Zeitschrift der Deutschen Morgenländischen Gesellschaft, 134 (1984), 269-73
- Weil, Jürgen W., 'Girls from Morocco and Spain: Selected Poems from an adab Collection of Poetry', Archiv Orientální, 52 (1984), 36–41.
- Weil, Jürgen W., 'Zweimal Butayna: Zum Reflex eines Liebespaares in einer späteren adab-Gedichtsammlung', Der Islam: Zeitschrift für Geschichte und Kultur des Islamischen Orients, 61 (1984), 319.
- Weil, Jürgen W., 'Miscella corneliana: fünf Epigramme aus dem späten adab', Wiener Zeitschrift für die Kunde des Morgenlandes, 82 [in memoriam Anton C. Schaendlinger] (1992), 445–48.
