= Safi al-Din al-Hilli =

14th-century Arab poet

Safī al-Dīn al-Hillī
- صفي الدين الحلي
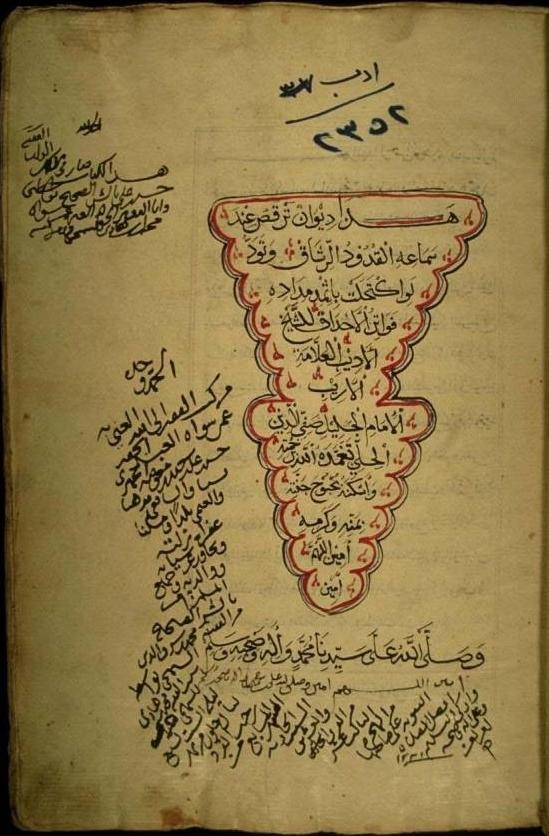
- Manuscript of the Diwan of Safiddin Hilli
- Born: 1278 AD/677 AH; Hillah
- Died: 1349 AD/749 AH (aged 71); Baghdad
- Occupations: Poet, mujahid, literary critic, politician
- Writing career
- Language: Arabic
- Period: Late Middle Ages
- Genres: Qasida, Ghazal, Adab, Maqtu, Dhikr
- Notable works: Diwan, Durar al-Nuhur

Abu ’l-Maḥāsin Ṣafī al-Dīn Abd al-Aziz ibn Saraya al-Ḥillī al-Ṭāyyʾī al-Sinbisī (Arabic: أبو المحاسن صفي الدين عبد العزيز بن سرايا الحلي الصاع السنبيسي; 26 August 1278 – 1349 AD/5 Rabi' al-Thani 677 – 749 AH), more commonly known as Ṣafī al-Dīn al-Ḥillī or Ṣafiddīn al-Ḥilli (Arabic: صفي الدين الحلي), was a 14th-century Arab warrior poet.

== Life ==
Despite his being one of the most famous poets of his century, the historical record of Al-Hilli's life is often vague. Al-Hilli's birth is recorded as 26 August 1278 in most sources, though one of his contemporaries gives his birth as October or November 1279. He was born in Hillah, Iraq, to a Shia Muslim family of the renowned Tayyi tribe. Early in life, after one of his uncles was murdered, Al-Hilli fought in a battle to avenge his death. He wrote poems about his family's exploits in this battle, which garnered a lot of attention.

After he achieved his initial success as a poet, a war broke out, having to leave his wives and his family behind, he was forced to leave Iraq in 1302. Around this time, he became the court poet in Mardin, modern-day Turkey, under the Artuqids. In his youth he made money mostly through commerce, later in life he made a living by writing eulogies for wealthy princes.

Al-Hilli died in 1338 or 1349.

== Poetry ==
Al-Hilli, alongside Ibn Nubata, was one of the two most celebrated Arab poets of the 14th century. Al-Hilli's poetic style was considered innovative and experimental, integrating established poetic traditions with new vocabulary.

Al-Hilli is perhaps best remembered for the poetic lines which inspired the Pan-Arab colors: "White are our deeds, black are our battles, / Green are our tents, red are our swords." These lines are from Al-Hilli's fakhr ("boasting") poem written to celebrate his family's victories in the battle to avenge his uncle.

His major poetic works are a collection of eulogies titled Durar al-Nuhur ("Jewels for Necks") and his Diwan ("Poems"). In his Diwan, he organizes his poems into twelve categories spanning most major Arabic thematic genres:

1. Boasting and bravery (Fakhr)
2. Eulogy, praise and thanksgiving (Madih)
3. Hunting poems and others (Tardiyyah)
4. Friendship (Khawal)
5. Ritha and condolence
6. Ghazal and other erotic themes
7. Wine and flower poetry (Khamriyyah)
8. Lamentations and chiding
9. Apologies, gifts and pleads for leniency
10. Philosophy and riddles
11. Adab, asceticism and religion
12. Satire and funny anecdotes.

Al-Hillī is also noted for composing one of four collections of epigrammatic maqṭūʿ-poems that were seminal for the development of the genre in the fourteenth century: his twenty-chapter Dīwān al-Mathālith wa-l-mathānī fī l-maʿālī wa-l-maʿānī ('The Collection of Two-liners and Three-liners on Virtues and Literary Motifs'). This was composed between 1331 and 1341 at the princely court in Hama, and dedicated to al-Malik al-Afḍal (r. 1332–41). In addition to writing poetry, he wrote several works of literary criticism on poetic forms.
