= Khalil al-Muradi =

Muslim historian

- خليل المرادي
- Born: 1760; Damascus, Ottoman Empire
- Died: 1791 (aged 30–31)
- Occupations: Historian, Hanafi mufti, naqib al-ashraf

Academic work
- Era: Ottoman Empire
- Main interests: Biographical dictionaries
- Notable works: Silk al-durar

Abu'l-Mawadda Sayyid Muhammad Khalil al-Muradi (1760–1791) was a Muslim historian under the Ottoman Empire. He was born into a family of ulema (Muslim scholars) and acted as Hanafi mufti and naqib al-ashraf (head of the Prophet's descendants) in Damascus. His most notable work was a biographical dictionary of the prominent ulema and a'yan (notables) of the Islamic world of the 12th century AH (18th century CE), entitled Silk al-durar. The work included some 1,000 biographical entries.

== Life ==
Muradi's great-grandfather, Murad ibn Ali al-Husayni (b. 1640), hailed from Samarkand in the Bukhara region of Central Asia. He was the son of Samarkand's naqib al-ashraf (local head of the prophet Muhammad's descendants). Murad migrated to the Mashreq (the eastern Arab world), settling in Damascus in 1670, to spread the teachings of his Sufi order, the Naqshbandi. He became the lead advocate of the Naqshbandi revival there. He moved to the imperial capital, Constantinople, in the mid-1680s. There, Sultan Mehmed IV, granted him a malikane (life-term tax farm) consisting of several villages in the countryside of Damascus. Murad thus established the religious, economic and political foundations upon which his descendants, the Muradi family, continued to serve as both the chief represtentatives of the Naqshbandi order in Damascus and the city's Hanafi muftis into the early and mid-19th-centuries, respectively. The historian Linda Schilcher compared the Muradis role among the Damascene ulema to that of the Azm family's role among the Damascene aghas (military men), both being newcomers to Damascus through their ties with the imperial government but emerging as dominant local dynasties in their respective fields.

Muradi's grandfather, Muhammad al-Muradi (1683–1755), forged close ties with the grandfather of Muradi's contemporary, Nu'man al-Bashmaqji, the Seyhülislam, the top religious authority in the empire after the sultan-caliph. This close relationship was maintained two generations later, with Muradi staying at Nu'man's home during his visit to Constantinople in 1778–1779 and later hosting Nu'man in his home in Damascus. Muradi's father Ali (1720–1771) and uncle Husayn (1725–1774) both served as the Hanafi muftis of Damascus and Muradi served the office as well between 1777 until his death. He died in Aleppo in 1791. He was also appointed naqib al-ashraf of Damascus.

His successor as mufti was Abd al-Rahman al-Muradi, who was either his son or cousin; Abd al-Rahman was executed in 1803 on the secret instruction of the Acre-based governor of Damascus, Ahmad Pasha al-Jazzar.

== Works ==
=== Silk al-durar ===
Muradi's notable work was a biographical dictionary of the prominent ulema and a'yan (notables) of the Islamic world of the 12th century AH (18th century CE), entitled Silk al-durar. The work included some 1,000 biographical entries. Around sixty-five percent of the entries were persons from the region of Syria, with over half of these being from Damascus, a reflection of Muradi's milieu. The majority of the entries (eighty-five percent) concerned ulema, including those with training in Islamic law or jurisprudence, hadiths, Sufiism, literature or poetry. They ranged the spectrum from the Seyhülislam to lowly Sufi mystics. Save for one Shia Muslim poet, all of the ulema entries were Sunni Muslims, over half affiliated with the Hanafi madhhab (school of law), the official madhhab of the Ottoman state and that of Muradi himself and forty percent with the Shafi'i madhhab, which was still prominent in Syria.

He is credited for persuading al-Jabarti to write his history of Egypt.

==== Editions ====
- Khalil b. Ali al-Muradi. Kitāb Silk al-durar fī aʿyān al-qarn al-thānī ʿashar. Būlāq: al-Maṭba'ah al-'Āmirah, 1874–83.
- Muḥammad Khalīl b. ʿAlī al-Murādī. Kitāb Silk al-durar fī aʿyān al-qarn al-thānī ʿashar. Ed. Muḥammad ʿAbd al-Qādir Shāhīn, 4 vols. Beirut: Dār al-Kutub al-ʿIlmiyyah, 1997.
- A sequence of twenty-nine mostly two-line maqāṭīʿ poems ending in the hemistich 'sweeter even than the juice of myrtle berries', which al-Murādī included in his entry for his uncle Ibrahim ibn Muhammad al-Muradi, is edited and translated by Adam Talib, How Do You Say “Epigram” in Arabic? Literary History at the Limits of Comparison, Brill Studies in Middle Eastern Literatures, 40 (Leiden: Brill, 2018), pp. 94–115; ISBN 978-90-04-34996-4.

=== Arf al-basham ===
In a lesser known work, Arf al-basham fi man wala fatwa Dimashq al-Sham [The Fragrance of Blossoms Concerning Those Appointed to the Muftiship of Damascus], Muradi compiles a list of all the muftis of Damascus from the Ottoman conquest to himself. Each is given a biographical entry, including an autobiography of himself. He extols the Ottoman state and its administrative and judicial reorganization of Syria from the time of Sultan Selim I (r. 1512–1520, whom he praises. He devotes a long poem praising Constantinople and his profound love for the city.

== Bibliography ==
- Gibb, H.A.R. (1993). "Murādī". In Bosworth, C. E.; van Donzel, E.; Heinrichs, W. P. & Pellat, Ch. (eds.). The Encyclopaedia of Islam, Second Edition. Volume VII: Mif–Naz. Leiden: E. J. Brill. p. 602. ISBN 978-90-04-09419-2.
- Tamari, Steve (2001). "Biography, Autobiography and Identity in Early Modern Damascus". In Fay, Mary Ann (ed.). Autobiography and the Construction of Identity and Community in the Middle East. New York: Palgrave. pp. 37–50. ISBN 978-1-349-62116-3.
