= Bandar-e Emam Khomeini =

City in Khuzestan province, Iran

Bandar-e Emam Khomeyni Persian: بندر امام خمینی
- City
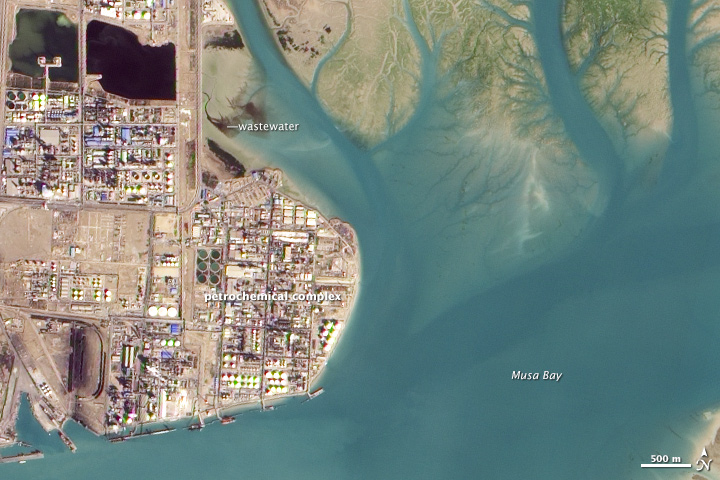
- Bandar-e Emam Khomeyni petrochemical complex, Musa Bay, Iran

- Location within Iran
- Coordinates: 30°30′21″N 49°04′27″E
- Country: Iran
- Province: Khuzestan
- County: Bandar Mahshahr
- District: Bandar-e Shapour

Population (2016)
  - Total: 78,353
- Time zone: UTC+3:30 (IRST)

Bandar-e Emam Khomeyni (Persian: بندر امام خمینی) (Note: Also romanized as Bandare Emam Xomeyni; or Bandar Shahpur during the Imperial State of Iran, also romanized as Bandar Šâhpur; and formerly Bandar-e Khomeyni (بندر خمینی)) is the capital city Bandar-e Emam Khomeyni District of Bandar Mahshahr County, Khuzestan province, Iran. It also serves as the administrative center for Bandar-e Emam Khomeyni Rural District.

Bandar-e Imam Khomeyni is a port city on the Persian Gulf. Before the 1979 Iranian Revolution, it was known as Bandar Shahpur. It is named after Ayatollah Ruhollah Khomeini. The city is home to Petrochimi Bandar Imam basketball club, which plays in the Iranian Super League.

== History ==
The port is located at the terminus of the Trans-Iranian Railway linking the Persian Gulf with Tehran and on to the Caspian Sea. It is part of same nautical complex as the port of the adjacent city of Bandar-e Mahshahr. Both ports are accessible through the same channel.

During World War II it consisted only of a jetty, two shipping berths, a railhead and warehouses and a civilian settlement some miles distant. The port, which was a base for a number of Iranian gunboats as well as the port in which a number of German and Italian merchant ships had taken shelter, was stormed on 25 August, 1941, by a combined British and Indian force supported by the Royal Navy. Both the Iranian gunboat and the Axis merchant shipping were captured without a shot being fired.

A flotilla led by the armed merchant cruiser HMS Kanimbla sailed up the waterways and in the raid captured eight Axis vessels, two gunboats and the floating dock. It was at time that, among others, the German ship Hohenfels fell into British hands and became Empire Kamal.

Thereafter it was administered by the US Army 482nd Port Battalion and served as a critical supply point for Allied military aid for Soviet Russia. The port facilities were also used for merchant and military vessel layup and repair. Three additional berths were built during the war.

== Demographics ==
=== Population ===
At the time of the 2006 National Census, the city's population was 67,078 in 14,681 households. The following census in 2011 counted 72,357 people in 18,382 households. The 2016 census measured the population of the city as 78,353 people in 21,810 households.

== Port operations ==
The port of Bandar-e Emam Khomeyni is an Iranian national port operating under the authority of the Iranian Ports and Maritime Organisation. it is the northernmost Iranian port on the Persian Gulf. The Bandar Imam port is a transshipment point for containers, bulk and general cargo, with exclusive access to the facilities held by the Islamic Republic of Iran Shipping Lines (IRISL Group). In 2005, the Iranian government proposed direct container shipments between the port and western Europe, but negotiations with shipping lines for dedicated port facilities and access have not concluded.

Iran imports grain mainly through its Persian Gulf harbours, but struggles to fund it. Most feed-grain (mainly corn from Brazil) is imported via the Strait of Hormuz to the Bandar-e Emam Khomeini harbour. 30% of wheat is imported.

A dozen kilometres east of Bandar-e Emam Khomeyni port is the port of Bandar-e Mahshahr which specialises in exporting oil and petrochemical products of the national companies NIOC and NPC. Both ports are accessible through the same 'Khor Musa' channel, which is 42 miles long and about 20 meters deep.

Bandar-e Emam Khomeyni port is connected by rail and road, to the west with Abadan and Khorramshahr and their joint Arvand Free Zone, along the Iran - Iraq border, and to the north to Ahvaz, Teheran and the Caspian Sea and the Caucasus countries.

The port has seven terminals with 40 berths of about 6,500 metres frontage.

Port facilities
Type	Berths	Depth (m)	Quay length (m)
General cargo	29	12	3512
Containers	5	11	1051
Grain silos	2	12	560
Barges	1	6	842
Gulf	1	5	307
Trans Terminal	1	4	75
Iron ore (unloading)	1	15	220

The terminals have warehouses with a capacity of 171,000 m^{2} and open storage areas covering 10.9 km^{2}.

== Transportation ==
=== Roads ===
- Freeway 5 (Persian Gulf Freeway)
- Road 96

== See also ==
- Port of Shahid Rajaee
