= Bandar-e Mahshahr =

City in Khuzestan province, Iran

Bandar-e Mahshahr Persian: بندرماهشهر
- City
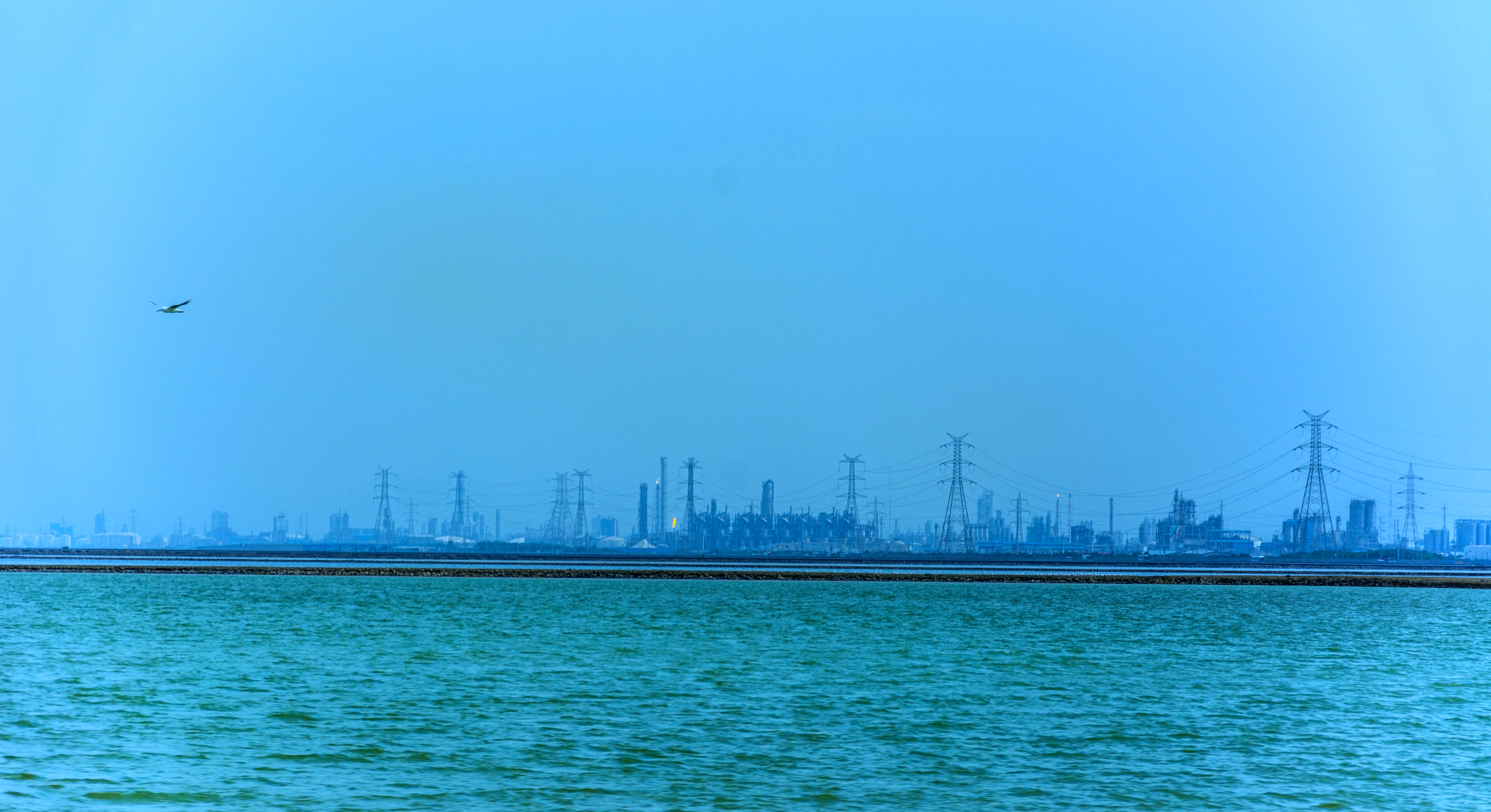
- Bandar Mahshahr in 2013

- Location within Iran
- Coordinates: 30°33′24″N 49°11′23″E
- Country: Islamic Republic of Iran
- Province: Khuzestan
- County: Bandar Mahshahr
- District: Central

Population (2016)
  - Total: 162,797
- Time zone: UTC+3:30 (IRST)
- Area code: +98

Bandar-e Mahshahr (Persian: بندرماهشهر) (Note: Also romanized as Bandar Mah-Shahr, Bandar Mahshahr, and Bandar-e Māhshahr; also known as Bandar Mah Sharh, Bandar-e Ma‘shūr, Bandar-mashoor, Bandar-Mashour, Bandar Ma‘shūr, Bandar Mashur, Bār Andāz, Mah Shahr, Māhshahr, and Mashur) is a city in the Central District of Bandar Mahshahr County, Khuzestan province, Iran, serving as capital of both the county and the district.

== Demographics ==
Most of its people speak a dialect that was a mixture of standard Persian, Southern Luri and Bushehri Persian, which is still spoken by most people, taught by the elderly people to the younger generations (the dialect though still thrives in Hendijan and especially Genaaveh). So now Mahshahrians are still mainly Lur-speaking. Local Persians are mostly of Behbahani, Qanavati, and Bandari families. There is also a local Arabic-speaking minority whose roots go back to Qabban in Iraq.

=== Population ===
Population history
Year	Pop.	±%
1956	15,694	—
1966	16,594	+5.7%
1976	29,940	+80.4%
1986	71,808	+139.8%
1991	74,248	+3.4%
1996	88,394	+19.1%
2006	109,927	+24.4%
2011	153,778	+39.9%
2016	162,797	+5.9%

At the time of the 2006 National Census, the city's population was 109,927 in 24,110 households. The following census in 2011 counted 153,778 people in 38,301 households. The 2016 census measured the population of the city as 162,797 people in 45,208 households.

== Climate ==
On July 31, 2015, at around 4:30 PM Iran Daylight Time (3:10 PM apparent solar time), the air temperature measured at the Bandar-e Mahshahr airport was 46 °C (115 °F), the dew point was 32 °C (90 °F), and the relative humidity was 49%. This corresponds to a wet-bulb temperature of 34.6 °C (94.3 °F), slightly below the 35 °C (95 °F) mark that is considered the maximum humans can tolerate, above which extended exposure will lead to death. Together, the city had a heat index of 74 °C (165 °F), the second highest heat index ever recorded anywhere in the world.

Climate data for Bandar-e Mahshahr (1987-2005)
Month	Jan	Feb	Mar	Apr	May	Jun	Jul	Aug	Sep	Oct	Nov	Dec	Year
Record high °C (°F)	26.5 (79.7)	29.6 (85.3)	35.2 (95.4)	42.0 (107.6)	48.0 (118.4)	51 (124)	54 (129)	53 (127)	49.0 (120.2)	42.8 (109.0)	35.8 (96.4)	28.0 (82.4)	54 (129)
Mean daily maximum °C (°F)	17.1 (62.8)	20.1 (68.2)	24.8 (76.6)	32.1 (89.8)	39.2 (102.6)	43.8 (110.8)	45.2 (113.4)	44.6 (112.3)	41.3 (106.3)	35.3 (95.5)	26.5 (79.7)	19.6 (67.3)	32.5 (90.5)
Daily mean °C (°F)	12.6 (54.7)	14.8 (58.6)	19.1 (66.4)	25.5 (77.9)	31.3 (88.3)	34.8 (94.6)	36.8 (98.2)	36.2 (97.2)	32.4 (90.3)	27.5 (81.5)	19.9 (67.8)	14.6 (58.3)	25.5 (77.9)
Mean daily minimum °C (°F)	8.1 (46.6)	9.4 (48.9)	13.3 (55.9)	19.0 (66.2)	23.4 (74.1)	25.8 (78.4)	28.4 (83.1)	27.8 (82.0)	23.5 (74.3)	19.6 (67.3)	13.4 (56.1)	9.6 (49.3)	18.5 (65.3)
Record low °C (°F)	−2.0 (28.4)	−2.6 (27.3)	1.4 (34.5)	7.6 (45.7)	14.0 (57.2)	18.0 (64.4)	23.0 (73.4)	20.0 (68.0)	15.0 (59.0)	8.8 (47.8)	0.0 (32.0)	0.0 (32.0)	−2.6 (27.3)
Average precipitation mm (inches)	53.5 (2.11)	28.2 (1.11)	29.6 (1.17)	12.2 (0.48)	1.9 (0.07)	0.1 (0.00)	0.0 (0.0)	0.0 (0.0)	0.2 (0.01)	6.1 (0.24)	30.9 (1.22)	50.7 (2.00)	213.4 (8.40)
Average precipitation days (≥ 1.0 mm)	5.7	3.6	3.7	1.9	0.5	0.1	0.0	0.0	0.1	0.8	2.5	5.9	24.8
Average relative humidity (%)	74	60	52	42	29	26	31	35	35	42	53	70	45
Mean monthly sunshine hours	183.4	212.4	233.4	236.7	301.7	344.5	342.8	336.0	302.8	269.9	215.1	182.4	3,161.1
Source: Iran Meteorological Organization (records), (temperatures), (precipitation), (humidity), (days with precipitation), (sunshine)

== Port and special economic zone ==
The port of Bandar-e Mahshahr is immediately adjacent to the East of the port of Bandar-e Emam Khomeyni. It is specialized in oil and petrochemical products exports. It includes a special economic zone used by the National Iranian Petrochemical Company and the National Petrochemical Company (NPC), the Special industrial economic zones 'Petzone'.

The port of Bandar-e Mahshahr is mostly used by tanker ships and is accessible through the same channel as the port of Bandar-e Emam Khomeyni, i.e. the 42 miles long, 45 meter deep Khor Musa channel.

== Universities ==
Mahshahr has two universities. Islamic Azad University of Mahshahr and Amirkabir University of Technology, Mahshahr campus. Both universities concentrate on engineering programs, especially petroleum and petrochemical engineering.

== 2026 conflict ==
In April 2026, during the US-Israel war on Iran, airstrikes targeted the special petrochemical zones of Mahshahr and Bandar Imam in Iran. Iranian media reports indicated that a minimum of five individuals lost their lives, while approximately 170 others sustained injuries as a result of the assaults on these regions.
