= Ibn Nubata =

14th-century Egyptian poet

- Born: Abu Bakr Jamāl al-Dīn Muḥammad ibn Shams al-Dīn Muḥammad ibn Sharaf al-Dīn Muḥammad ibn al-Ḥasan ibn Ṣāliḥ ibn Yaḥyā ibn Ṭāhir ibn Muḥammad ibn al-Khaṭīb ʿAbd al-Raḥīm ibn Nubāta; April 1287; Cairo, Egypt
- Died: 14 October 1366 (aged 79); Cairo, Egypt
- Occupation: Poet
- Writing career
- Language: Arabic
- Notable work: al-Qaṭr an-Nubātī

Abu Bakr Jamāl al-Dīn Muḥammad ibn Shams al-Dīn Muḥammad ibn Sharaf al-Dīn Muḥammad ibn al-Ḥasan ibn Ṣāliḥ ibn Yaḥyā ibn Ṭāhir ibn Muḥammad ibn al-Khaṭīb ʿAbd al-Raḥīm ibn Nubāta (Arabic: أَبُو بَكْر جَمَال الدِّين مُحَمَّد اِبْن شَمْس الدِّين مُحَمَّد اِبْن شَرَف الدِّين مُحَمَّد اِبْن الْحَسَن اِبْن صَالِح اِبْن يَحْيَى اِبْن طَاهِر اِبْن مُحَمَّد اِبْن الْخَاطِب عَبْد الرَّحِيم اِبْن نُبَاتَة), better known simply as Ibn Nubāta (Arabic: ابن نباتة; April 1287 – October 14, 1366) was an Arab poet of the Mamluk period. Best known for his poetry, he also wrote prose. His works are largely not, or not critically, edited to this day, but in 2018 Thomas Bauer was reported to be completing an edition of his al-Qaṭr an-Nubātī ('Ibn Nubātah's Sweet Drops'). Research on Ibn Nubata's work is still in its infancy.

Ibn Nubata was the son of a Hadith scholar and from early youth his interest in poetry emerged in short poems he wrote. Born in Fusṭāṭ, in 1316 he left Cairo for Damascus and lived there until 1360, taking short stays in Hama and Aleppo. However, the Sultan An-Nasir Hasan ordered his return to Cairo.

Ibn Nubata, alongside Ṣafīddīn al-Ḥillī, was one of the two most celebrated Arab poets of the 14th century.

Ibn Nubata died on October 14, 1366 (8 Safar 768 AH), and is buried in the Qalawun cemetery of Al-Mansur Qalawun.

Ibn Nubāta was a seminal writer in the development of the epigrammatic poetic form known as maqṭūʿ: al-Qaṭr an-Nubātī is thought to be the first sole-authored collection of poems in this genre.
