= Sadeyreh-ye Olya =

Sadeyreh-ye Olya سديره عليا
- Village
- Location within Iran
- Coordinates: 30°43′13″N 49°10′46″E
- Country: Iran
- Province: Khuzestan
- County: Mahshahr
- Bakhsh: Central
- Rural District: Jarahi

Population (2006)
  - Total: 99
- Time zone: UTC+3:30 (IRST)
  - Summer (DST): UTC+4:30 (IRDT)

Sadeyreh-ye Olya (Persian: سديره عليا, also Romanized as Sadeyreh-ye ‘Olyā; also known as Şaveyreh, Şoveyreh, Surin, and Sweira) is a village in Jarahi Rural District, in the Central District of Mahshahr County, Khuzestan Province, Iran. At the 2006 census, its population was 99, in 21 families.
