= Magtu, Ahvaz =

Magtu مگطوع
- Village
- Location within Iran
- Coordinates: 30°54′28″N 48°39′59″E
- Country: Iran
- Province: Khuzestan
- County: Ahvaz
- Bakhsh: Central
- Rural District: Esmailiyeh

Population (2006)
  - Total: 653
- Time zone: UTC+3:30 (IRST)
  - Summer (DST): UTC+4:30 (IRDT)

Magtu (Persian: مگطوع, also Romanized as Magṭūʿ; also known as 'Makţū‘ and Maqţū‘) is a village in Esmailiyeh Rural District, in the Central District of Ahvaz County, Khuzestan Province, Iran. At the 2006 census, its population was 653, in 126 families.
