= Bonvar Hoseyn =

Village in Khuzestan, Iran

Bonvar Hoseyn بنوارحسين
- Village
- Location within Iran
- Coordinates: 32°21′35″N 48°18′46″E
- Country: Iran
- Province: Khuzestan
- County: Dezful
- Bakhsh: Central
- Rural District: Qeblehi

Population (2006)
  - Total: 674
- Time zone: UTC+3:30 (IRST)
  - Summer (DST): UTC+4:30 (IRDT)

Bonvar Hoseyn (Persian: بنوارحسين, also Romanized as Bonvār Ḩoseyn and 'Benvār-e Ḩoseyn; also known as Bownvar-e Bozorg, Bunwar Buzurg, and Hoseyn Bozorg) is a village in Qeblehi Rural District, in the Central District of Dezful County, Khuzestan Province, Iran. At the 2006 census, its population was 674, in 139 families.
