= Bandar-e Dayyer =

City in Bushehr province, Iran

Bandar-e Dayyer Persian: بندر دیر
- City
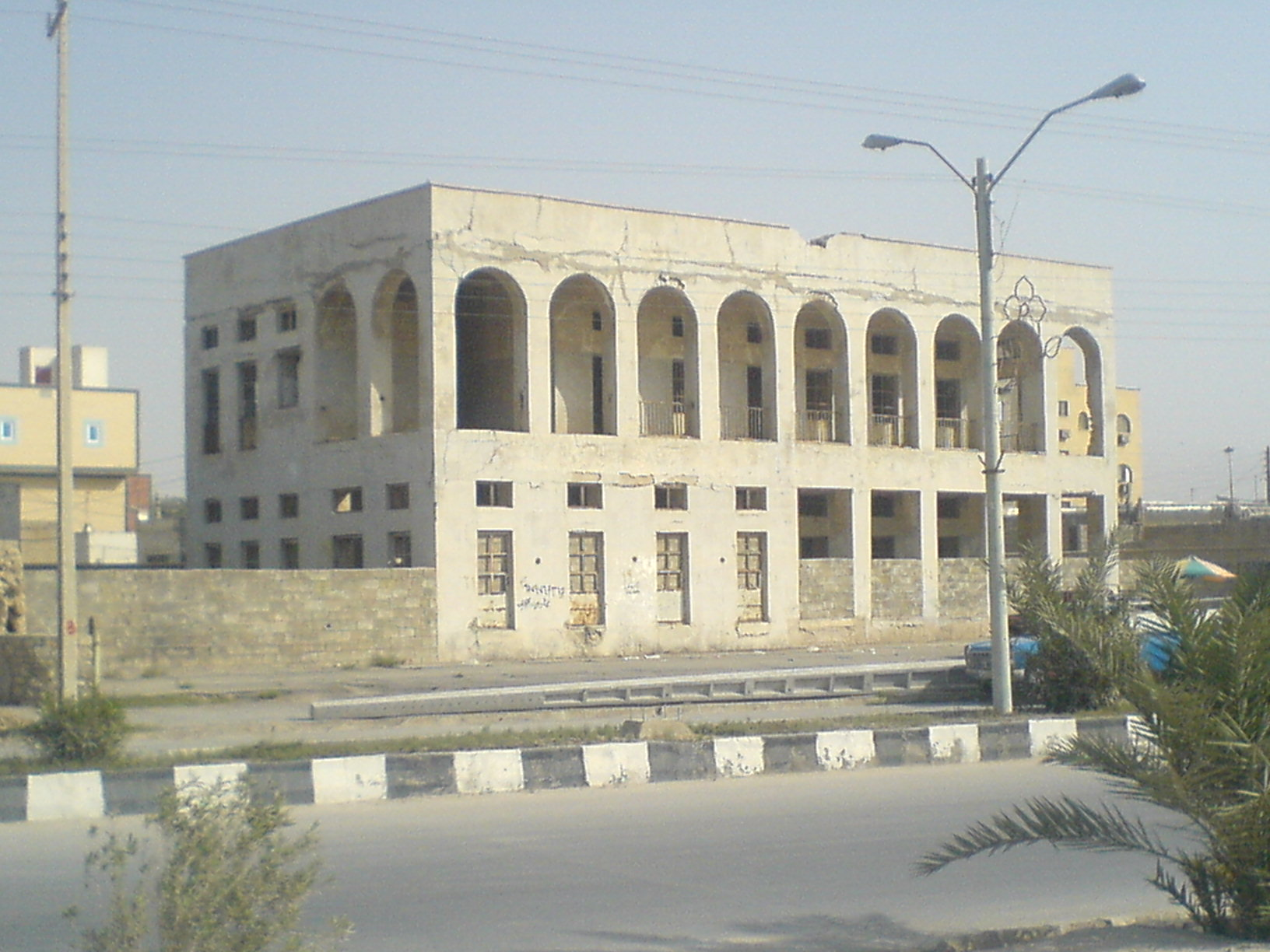
- Gomroke in Dayyer

- Location within Iran
- Coordinates: 27°50′25″N 51°56′24″E
- Country: Iran
- Province: Bushehr
- County: Deyr
- District: Central

Population (2016)
  - Total: 24,083
- Time zone: UTC+3:30 (IRST)

Bandar-e Dayyer (Persian: بندر دیر) (Note: Also romanized as Bandar-e Deyer and Bandar-e Deyr; also known as Daiyir, Dayer, Deyyer, and Qal’eh Dīr) is a city in the Central District of Deyr County, Bushehr province, Iran, serving as capital of both the county and the district. Bandar-e Deyr was a prominent commercial port in the Persian Gulf, and the Jewish settlers were dominating the local market

== Demographics ==
=== Population ===
At the time of the 2006 National Census, the city's population was 18,454 in 3,882 households. The following census in 2011 counted 20,157 people in 4,890 households. The 2016 census measured the population of the city as 24,083 people in 6,680 households.

== Jewish community ==
Some historians believe that Bandar-e Dayyer during the 13th century was exclusively inhabited by Jews. In the 19th century Lorimer stated that the population is about 5,500 souls, including some Jews. The Jewish community during the 19th century had an estimated population of 20 to 50 families.

== Climate ==
Climate data for Bandar-e Dayyer (1991–2020)
Month	Jan	Feb	Mar	Apr	May	Jun	Jul	Aug	Sep	Oct	Nov	Dec	Year
Record high °C (°F)	30.4 (86.7)	30.4 (86.7)	36.6 (97.9)	44.5 (112.1)	50.1 (122.2)	50.0 (122.0)	49.8 (121.6)	49.5 (121.1)	49.5 (121.1)	44.5 (112.1)	37.6 (99.7)	33.8 (92.8)	50.1 (122.2)
Mean daily maximum °C (°F)	22.1 (71.8)	23.4 (74.1)	26.8 (80.2)	32.2 (90.0)	38.1 (100.6)	39.4 (102.9)	39.1 (102.4)	38.2 (100.8)	37.3 (99.1)	34.8 (94.6)	29.2 (84.6)	24.6 (76.3)	32.1 (89.8)
Daily mean °C (°F)	17.7 (63.9)	19.0 (66.2)	22.2 (72.0)	26.9 (80.4)	32.2 (90.0)	34.0 (93.2)	34.8 (94.6)	34.7 (94.5)	33.2 (91.8)	29.8 (85.6)	24.2 (75.6)	19.8 (67.6)	27.4 (81.3)
Mean daily minimum °C (°F)	13.4 (56.1)	14.6 (58.3)	17.7 (63.9)	22.2 (72.0)	27.2 (81.0)	29.1 (84.4)	30.7 (87.3)	30.6 (87.1)	28.2 (82.8)	24.5 (76.1)	19.6 (67.3)	15.4 (59.7)	22.8 (73.0)
Record low °C (°F)	1.0 (33.8)	5.4 (41.7)	10.0 (50.0)	2.0 (35.6)	17.4 (63.3)	20.4 (68.7)	23.8 (74.8)	25.5 (77.9)	20.4 (68.7)	13.4 (56.1)	10.0 (50.0)	7.2 (45.0)	1.0 (33.8)
Average precipitation mm (inches)	70.3 (2.77)	27.7 (1.09)	21.5 (0.85)	5.8 (0.23)	1.0 (0.04)	0.0 (0.0)	1.1 (0.04)	0.0 (0.0)	0.0 (0.0)	1.8 (0.07)	38.5 (1.52)	54.0 (2.13)	221.7 (8.73)
Average precipitation days (≥ 1.0 mm)	3.8	2.3	2.5	1.2	0.1	0.0	0.1	0.0	0.0	0.3	2.6	2.7	15.6
Average relative humidity (%)	60.0	57.0	54.0	49.0	43.0	51.0	58.0	64.0	58.0	53.0	51.0	57.0	54.6
Average dew point °C (°F)	9.3 (48.7)	9.6 (49.3)	11.2 (52.2)	13.7 (56.7)	14.9 (58.8)	19.1 (66.4)	23.5 (74.3)	26.1 (79.0)	22.8 (73.0)	18.2 (64.8)	12.5 (54.5)	10.3 (50.5)	15.9 (60.6)
Mean monthly sunshine hours	230.0	214.0	241.0	257.0	320.0	341.0	321.0	314.0	299.0	298.0	242.0	239.0	3,316
Source: NOAA, Ogimet (May record high)

== See also ==
Media related to Bandar Deyr at Wikimedia Commons
