= Shahrak-e Hamzeh, Choghamish =

Shahrak-e Hamzeh شهرك حمزه
- Village
- Location within Iran
- Coordinates: 32°10′36″N 48°33′47″E
- Country: Iran
- Province: Khuzestan
- County: Dezful
- Bakhsh: Choghamish
- Rural District: Kheybar

Population (2006)
  - Total: 1,959
- Time zone: UTC+3:30 (IRST)
  - Summer (DST): UTC+4:30 (IRDT)

Shahrak-e Hamzeh (Persian: شهرك حمزه, also Romanized as Shahrak-e Ḩamzeh) is a village in Kheybar Rural District, Choghamish District, Dezful County, Khuzestan Province, Iran. At the 2006 census, its population was 1,959, in 376 families.
