= Maksar =

Maksar مكسر
- Village
- Location within Iran
- Coordinates: 31°08′49″N 48°25′54″E
- Country: Iran
- Province: Khuzestan
- County: Ahvaz
- Bakhsh: Central
- Rural District: Esmailiyeh

Population (2006)
  - Total: 326
- Time zone: UTC+3:30 (IRST)
  - Summer (DST): UTC+4:30 (IRDT)

Maksar (Persian: مكسر, also Romanized as Makşar; also known as Magsar, Maqsar, and Maqşer) is a village in Esmailiyeh Rural District, in the Central District of Ahvaz County, Khuzestan Province, Iran. At the 2006 census, its population was 326, in 53 families.
