= Maqṭūʿ =

Maqṭūʿ (Arabic: مقطوع) or maqṭūʿah (plural maqāṭīʿ) is a form of Arabic poetry. Maqāṭīʿ are epigrammatic: brief and generally witty. In the view of Adam Talib, the genre has been underrated by Western scholars, partly because of the low regard for extremely short verse forms in Western traditions.

== Form ==
Maqṭūʿ poems are mostly of two lines, but occasionally as short as one or as many as ten; they are composed in the classical metres of Arabic prosody and are characterised by a premise-exposition-resolution structure, frequently including play on words and double entendre. Popular subject matter in the genre includes people (with the final hemistich mentioning their name), ekphrasis (making such poems part of the waṣf genre), riddles and chronograms.

=== Example ===
Zayn ad-Dīn Ibn al-Wardī composed the following maqṭūʿ in the mujtathth metre, cited by Ibn Ḥijjah al-Ḥamawī (d. 837/1434) in his Khizānat al-adab wa-ghāyat al-arab ('The Storehouse of Literature and the Utmost in Erudition'), and translated by Adam Talib:

إِنْ قُلْتُ قَدُّكِ غُصْنٌ\\قالَتْ لِيَ ٱلغُصْنُ ساجِدْ
أّوْ قُلْتُ ريقُكِ ثَلْجٌ\\قالت تَشَبُّهُ بارِدْ

Translation:

If I were to say, ‘Your body is like the bough of a tree’;
She’d say, ‘The bough prostrates in prayer.’
If I were to say, ‘The taste of your mouth (lit. your saliva) is like ice’;
She’d say, ‘What a chilly/dull simile!’”

== Development of genre and terminology ==
Arabic literature has a rich tradition of pithy two-line poems; these were composed for centuries without being thought of as maqāṭīʿ, and the term maqṭūʿ seems, prior to becoming the name of a poetic form, to have meant 'metrical feet in a line of poetry'. Thus, for example, ʿAbū Ṭālib ʿAbd al-Salām ibn al-Ḥasan al-Maʾmūnī (d. 993 CE) produced many ekphrastic, epigrammatic poems, and ʿAlī ibn Muḥammad ibn al-Riḍā ibn Muḥammad al-Ḥusaynī al-Musāwī al-Ṭūsī (d. 655 AH/1257 CE) was a prolific composer of epigrams on slaves and slave-girls. In the thirteenth century CE, the term began to be used systematically to denote the epigrammatic form to which it continues to refer. The fourteenth century saw it being used as a genre term, and this usage has become firmly established by the fifteenth.

=== The emergence of maqṭūʿ anthologies ===
Adam Talib has argued that the anthologisation of poems that came to be known as maqāṭīʿ was crucial to the emergence of the form as a distinct genre, since resonances between the poems within a collection worked to make the whole anthology greater than the sum of its parts.

Key exponents of the form of the solo-authored maqṭūʿ-collection emerged in the fourteenth century: Jamāl al-Dīn Ibn Nubāta (d. 768 AH/1366 CE) and his al-Qaṭr an-Nubātī ('Ibn Nubātah's Sweet Drops'); Badr ad-Dīn Ibn Ḥabīb al-Ḥalabī (d. 779/1377), al-Shudhūr ('The Particles of Gold'); Ṣafī ad-Dīn al-Ḥillī (d. c. 750/1350), Dīwān al-Mathālith wa-l-mathānī fī l-maʿālī wa-l-maʿānī ('The Collection of Two-liners and Three-liners on Virtues and Literary Motifs'); Ṣalāḥ ad-Dīn al-Ṣafadī (d. 764/1363), ar-Rawḍ al-bāsim wa-l-ʿarf an-nāsim ('Fragrance Wafting in the Smiling Garden') and al-Ḥusn aṣ-ṣarīḥ fī miʾat malīḥ ('Pure Beauty: On One Hundred Handsome Lads').

Poets also exchanged maqāṭīʿ, whether in mutual admiration (such as al-Shihāb al-Ḥijāzī and Taqī ad-Dīn al-Badrī) or as invective (such as al-Nawājī and Ibn Ḥijjah), enabling sophisticated artistic collaborations across a series of poems. Thus a long exchange of maqāṭīʿ-poems between al-Ṣafadī and Ibn Nubāta explores metaphors using doves.

Later anthologists presented as important case studies of the genre by Adam Talib include Muḥammad Khalīl al-Murādī (d. 1206/1791), who took a detour from the biography of his paternal uncle Ibrāhīm ibn Muḥammad al-Murādī (d. 1142/1730) in his biographical dictionary Silk ad-durar fī aʿyān al-qarn ath-thānī ʿashar, to offer what Talib calls a 'micro-anthology' of maqāṭīʿ-poems on the juice of myrtle berries (māʾ ḥabb al-ās), almost all ending in the line Arabic: هو أحلى مِنْ ماعِ حَبِّ آﻻَسِ ('sweeter even than the juice of myrtle berries') The collection orders poems creatively to explore how poets respond to one another, and to reveal continuities and contrasts of style and metaphor. Meanwhile, a micro-collection of 42 maqāṭīʿ-poems from Rawḍ al-ādāb by Shihāb ad-Dīn al-Ḥijāzī al-Khazrajī (d. 875/1471) 'treats many common mujūn subjects including humiliation at the hands of a jester, pesky bugs, stubborn animals, and above all sexual matters that were considered shameful at the time: impotence, infidelity and cuckoldry, and what we now call bottoming (in male-male anal sex)'.
