= Hamzeh, Shush =

Hamzeh حمزه
- Village
- Location within Iran
- Coordinates: 32°09′06″N 48°15′26″E
- Country: Iran
- Province: Khuzestan
- County: Shush
- Bakhsh: Central
- Rural District: Hoseynabad

Population (2006)
  - Total: 345
- Time zone: UTC+3:30 (IRST)
  - Summer (DST): UTC+4:30 (IRDT)

Hamzeh (Persian: حمزه, also Romanized as Ḩamzeh; also known as Shahīd Ḩamzeh) is a village in Hoseynabad Rural District, in the Central District of Shush County, Khuzestan Province, Iran. At the 2006 census, its population was 345, in 51 families.
