= Bonvar Shami =

Bonvar Shami بنوارشامي
- Village
- Location within Iran
- Coordinates: 32°19′35″N 48°26′59″E
- Country: Iran
- Province: Khuzestan
- County: Dezful
- Bakhsh: Central
- Rural District: Shamsabad

Population (2006)
  - Total: 715
- Time zone: UTC+3:30 (IRST)
  - Summer (DST): UTC+4:30 (IRDT)

Bonvar Shami (Persian: بنوارشامي, also Romanized as Bonvār Shāmī, Benvār-e Shāmī, and Bonvār-e Shāmī; also known as Bonvar) is a village in Shamsabad Rural District, in the Central District of Dezful County, Khuzestan Province, Iran. At the 2006 census, its population was 715, in 152 families.
