= Horriyeh, Ahvaz =

Horriyeh حريه
- Village
- Location within Iran
- Coordinates: 31°39′22″N 48°41′05″E
- Country: Iran
- Province: Khuzestan
- County: Ahvaz
- Bakhsh: Central
- Rural District: Elhayi

Population (2006)
  - Total: 308
- Time zone: UTC+3:30 (IRST)
  - Summer (DST): UTC+4:30 (IRDT)

Horriyeh (Persian: حريه, also Romanized as Ḩorrīyeh; also known as Ḩorrīyeh-ye Yek) is a village in Elhayi Rural District, in the Central District of Ahvaz County, Khuzestan Province, Iran. At the 2006 census, its population was 308, in 50 families.
