= Benvar, Shadegan =

Benvar بنوار
- Village
- Location within Iran
- Coordinates: 30°45′11″N 48°43′07″E
- Country: Iran
- Province: Khuzestan
- County: Shadegan
- Bakhsh: Central
- Rural District: Jaffal

Population (2006)
  - Total: 57
- Time zone: UTC+3:30 (IRST)
  - Summer (DST): UTC+4:30 (IRDT)

Benvar (Persian: بنوار, also Romanized as Benvār) is a village in Jaffal Rural District, in the Central District of Shadegan County, Khuzestan Province, Iran. At the 2006 census, its population was 57, in 10 families.
