= Dara Island =

Uninhabited Iranian island

Dara island
Persian: جزیره دارا
- Location within Iran
- Interactive map of Dara island

Geography
- Location: Persian Gulf
- Coordinates: 30°6′5″N 49°6′28″E

Administration
- Iran

Dara (Persian: دارا) is an Iranian uninhabited island in the Persian Gulf. The island is located on the mouth of Musa Bay. This island is a habitat for aquatic and coastal birds, including terns and coral reefs in the Persian Gulf.
