= Magtu, Karun =

Magtu مگتوع
- Village
- Location within Iran
- Coordinates: 31°12′19″N 48°32′19″E
- Country: Iran
- Province: Khuzestan
- County: Karun
- Bakhsh: Soveyseh
- Rural District: Soveyseh

Population (2006)
  - Total: 72
- Time zone: UTC+3:30 (IRST)
  - Summer (DST): UTC+4:30 (IRDT)

Magtu (Persian: مگتوع, also Romanized as Magtūʿ; also known as Maktū‘ and Maqţū‘) is a village in Soveyseh Rural District, in the Soveyseh District of Karun County, Khuzestan Province, Iran. At the 2006 census, its population was 72, in 14 families.
