= Shahrak-e Hamzeh, Ilam =

Shahrak-e Hamzeh شهرك حمزه
- Village
- Location within Iran
- Coordinates: 32°21′54″N 47°56′20″E
- Country: Iran
- Province: Ilam
- County: Dehloran
- Bakhsh: Musian
- Rural District: Dasht-e Abbas

Population (2006)
  - Total: 541
- Time zone: UTC+3:30 (IRST)
  - Summer (DST): UTC+4:30 (IRDT)

Shahrak-e Hamzeh (Persian: شهرك حمزه, also Romanized as Shahrak-e Ḩamzeh; also known as Ḩamzeh and Shāvarīyeh) is a village in Dasht-e Abbas Rural District, Musian District, Dehloran County, Ilam Province, Iran. At the 2006 census, its population was 541, in 86 families. The village is populated by Arabs.
