= Gholam Ali Safai Bushehri =

Iranian Twelver Shia Ayatollah (born 1959)

- غلامعلی صفایی بوشهری
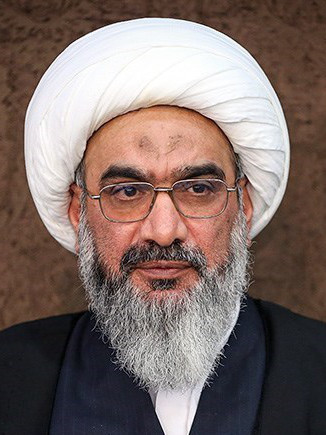

Representative of Guardianship of the Islamic Jurist in Bushehr Province

Imam of Friday Prayer in Bushehr

Personal details
- Born: 22 March 1959 (age 67) Bushehr, Pahlavi Iran
- Education: Qom Hawza
- Known for: Ayatollah and politician

Gholam Ali Safai Bushehri (Persian: غلامعلی صفایی بوشهری) (born 22 March 1959 in Bushehr) is an Iranian Twelver Shia cleric who is the representative of Vali-e-Faqih (Guardianship of the Islamic Jurist) in Bushehr Province, and the Imam of Friday Prayer in Bushehr, who has been appointed to these positions by the decree of Vali-e-Faqih, Seyyed Ali Khamenei—the supreme leader of Iran.

Safai (Safayi) Bushehri was born on 22 March 1959, in the city of Bushehr in a religious family. He graduated from his elementary school in Baqeri School, and was educated at the high school of Sa'adat. This Shia cleric moved to Qom in 1983, and was educated there at Hawzah; and also taught there. Gholam Ali studied for about 17 years. Later on, he went to the school of Dar-al-Shafa', and got married at that time and has two daughters and a son. Safai Bushehri has the record of teaching at Hawzah, etc.

== Compilations ==
- Simaye Tarikhe Eslam
- Tarjome Va Sharhe Moghni Al-Adib
- Amoozeshe Moghadamati Nahv
- Tarjome Sahife Sajadieh
- Al-Motoon Lel-Taalim Va Al-Tadrib
- Chehel Cheraghe Asemane Esmat
- Al-Nahv Al-Tatbighi
- Bedaye Al-Nahv
- Amoozeshe Sarf
- Raveshe Tahsile Adabiate Arab
- Tajzieh Va Tarkib
- Badat Al-Tamarin
- Dastanhaye Asemani
- Vaghte Zohoor Nazdik Ast
- Moghni Al-Adib

== See also ==
- Qom Seminary
- Abdul-Nabi Namazi
