= Bandar-e Emam Khomeyni Rural District =

Rural district in Khuzestan province, Iran

Bandar-e Emam Khomeyni Rural District Persian: دهستان بندر امام خمینی
- Rural District
- Location within Iran
- Coordinates: 30°25′32″N 49°02′46″E
- Country: Iran
- Province: Khuzestan
- County: Bandar Mahshahr
- District: Bandar-e Emam Khomeyni
- Capital: Bandar-e Emam Khomeyni

Population (2016)
  - Total: 732
- Time zone: UTC+3:30 (IRST)

Bandar-e Emam Khomeyni Rural District (Persian: دهستان بندر امام خمینی) is in Bandar-e Emam Khomeyni District of Bandar Mahshahr County, Khuzestan province, Iran. It is administered from the city of Bandar-e Emam Khomeyni.

== Demographics ==
=== Population ===
At the time of the 2006 National Census, the rural district's population was 922 in 197 households. There were 1,034 inhabitants in 231 households at the following census of 2011. The 2016 census measured the population of the rural district as 732 in 200 households. The most populous of its 50 villages was Shahrak-e Vali-ye Asr, with 728 people.
