= Bandar-e Emam Khomeyni District =

District in Khuzestan province, Iran

Bandar-e Emam Khomeyni District Persian: بخش بندر امام خمینی
- District
- Location within Iran
- Coordinates: 30°25′32″N 49°02′46″E
- Country: Iran
- Province: Khuzestan
- County: Bandar Mahshahr
- Capital: Bandar-e Emam Khomeyni

Population (2016)
  - Total: 79,085
- Time zone: UTC+3:30 (IRST)

Bandar-e Emam Khomeyni District (Persian: بخش بندر امام خمینی) is in Bandar Mahshahr County, Khuzestan province, Iran. Its capital is the city of Bandar-e Emam Khomeyni.

== Demographics ==
=== Population ===
At the time of the 2006 National Census, the district's population was 68,000 in 14,878 households. The following census in 2011 counted 73,391 people in 18,613 households. The 2016 census measured the population of the district as 79,085 inhabitants in 22,010 households.

=== Administrative divisions ===
Bandar-e Emam Khomeyni District Population
Administrative Divisions	2006	2011	2016
Bandar-e Emam Khomeyni RD	922	1,034	732
Bandar-e Emam Khomeyni (city) (Note: Formerly Bandar-e Khomeyni)	67,078	72,357	78,353
Total	68,000	73,391	79,085
RD = Rural District
