= Jarahi Rural District =

Rural district in Khuzestan province, Iran

Jarahi Rural District Persian: شهرک جراحی
- Rural District
- Location within Iran
- Coordinates: 30°31′N 49°14′E
- Country: Iran
- Province: Khuzestan
- County: Bandar Mahshahr
- District: Central
- Capital: Hashcheh-ye Sofla

Population (2016)
  - Total: 20,884
- Time zone: UTC+3:30 (IRST)

Jarahi Rural District (Persian: دهستان جراحی) is in the Central District of Bandar Mahshahr County, Khuzestan province, Iran. Its capital is the village of Hashcheh-ye Sofla.

== Demographics ==
=== Population ===
At the time of the 2006 National Census, the rural district's had a population of 51,358 in 10,424 households. By the 2011 census, the population had decreased to 19,730 in 4,517 households. The 2016 census recorded a population of 20,884 in 4,968 households. The most populous of its 154 villages was Shahrak-e Ayatollah Madani, with 6,089 residents.
