= Central District (Bandar Mahshahr County) =

District in Khuzestan province, Iran

Central District (Bandar Mahshahr County) Persian: بخش مرکزی شهرستان ماهشهر
- District
- Location within Iran
- Coordinates: 30°31′N 49°14′E
- Country: Iran
- Province: Khuzestan
- County: Bandar Mahshahr
- Capital: Bandar-e Mahshahr

Population (2016)
  - Total: 217,186
- Time zone: UTC+3:30 (IRST)

The Central District of Bandar Mahshahr County (Persian: بخش مرکزی شهرستان ماهشهر) is in Khuzestan province, Iran. Its capital is the city of Bandar-e Mahshahr.

Bandar-e Mahshahr is an ancient city and port in Khuzestan province in southwestern Iran. Originally known as Reyshahr and then Machuleh, it eventually came to be known as Bandar-e Ma'shoor. The name changed again in 1965, this time to Bandar-e Mah Shahr. The word Mah-shahr means "city of the moon."

== Demographics ==
=== Population ===
At the time of the 2006 National Census, the district's population was 179,804 in 38,469 households. The following census in 2011 counted 204,646 people in 50,941 households. The 2016 census measured the population of the district as 217,186 inhabitants in 59,201 households.

=== Administrative divisions ===
Central District (Bandar Mahshahr County) Population
Administrative Divisions	2006	2011	2016
Jarahi RD	51,358	19,730	20,884
Bandar-e Mahshahr (city)	109,927	153,778	162,797
Chamran (city)	18,519	31,138	33,505
Total	179,804	204,646	217,186
RD = Rural District
