= Bandar Mahshahr County =

County in Khuzestan province, Iran

Bandar Mahshahr County Persian: شهرستان بندر ماهشهر
- County
- Location of Bandar Mahshahr County in Khuzestan province (bottom center, yellow)

- Location of Khuzestan province in Iran
- Coordinates: 30°31′N 49°14′E
- Country: Iran
- Province: Khuzestan
- Capital: Bandar-e Mahshahr
- Districts: Central, Bandar-e Emam Khomeyni

Population (2016)
  - Total: 296,271
- Time zone: UTC+3:30 (IRST)

Bandar Mahshahr County (Persian: شهرستان بندر ماهشهر) is in Khuzestan province, Iran. Its capital is the city of Bandar-e Mahshahr.

== Demographics ==
=== Population ===
At the time of the 2006 National Census, the county's population was 247,804 in 53,347 households. The following census in 2011 counted 278,037 people in 69,488 households. The 2016 census measured the population of the county as 296,271 in 81,211 households.

=== Administrative divisions ===
Bandar Mahshahr County's population history and administrative structure over three consecutive censuses are shown in the following table.

Bandar Mahshahr County Population
| Administrative Divisions | 2006 | 2011 | 2016 |
|---|---|---|---|
| Central District | 179,804 | 204,646 | 217,186 |
| Jarahi RD | 51,358 | 19,730 | 20,884 |
| Bandar-e Mahshahr (city) | 109,927 | 153,778 | 162,797 |
| Chamran (city) | 18,519 | 31,138 | 33,505 |
| Bandar-e Emam Khomeyni District | 68,000 | 73,391 | 79,085 |
| Bandar-e Emam Khomeyni RD | 922 | 1,034 | 732 |
| Bandar-e Emam Khomeyni (city) (Note: Formerly Bandar-e Khomeyni) | 67,078 | 72,357 | 78,353 |
| Total | 247,804 | 278,037 | 296,271 |
RD = Rural District

== See also ==
Media related to Mahshahr County at Wikimedia Commons
